= Midtown Madness 2 =

2000 video game

- Cover art featuring Audi TT driving up road with London Bus and an train in another way.
- Developer: Angel Studios
- Publisher: Microsoft
- Producer: Jay Panek
- Designer: Frédéric Markus
- Programmers: Gabriel Valencia; David Etherton
- Artists: Andrea Elam; Marshall Ross
- Platform: Windows
- Release: NA: September 21, 2000; EU: October 6, 2000
- Genre: Racing
- Modes: Single-player, Multiplayer

Midtown Madness 2 is a 2000 racing game for Windows. It is the sequel to 1999's Midtown Madness, developed by Angel Studios (now Rockstar San Diego) and published by Microsoft. Unlike its predecessor, which is entirely set in Chicago, it features two open worlds in which to race: fictional representations of San Francisco and London. Players can choose from a variety of American and British vehicles, including sports cars, buses and taxi cabs. The game has various modes of multiplayer connectivity, and it included support for the now-defunct MSN Gaming Zone. A sequel, Midtown Madness 3, was released for Xbox in 2003.

Midtown Madness 2 received generally favorable reviews, and it holds a score of 78 out of 100 at gaming aggregator Metacritic. Reviewers praised gameplay in both single and multiplayer scenarios, particularly the returning Cops 'n Robbers mode in multiplayer, and the new Crash Course mode in single-player mode. They were more critical of the game's graphics, with some reviewers feeling they were dated, and of the game's occasional latency issues online.

== Gameplay ==
Midtown Madness 2 features vehicles ranging from a Ford Mustang to a Freightliner Century, and takes place in both San Francisco and London.

The game features a range of vehicles that can be driven around London and San Francisco. There are Blitz, Checkpoint, Circuit, and Cruise modes, which are all derived from the original Midtown Madness game. Winning Blitz, Checkpoint and Circuit races allows the player to access unlockables, and the Cruise mode lets the player roam freely around the two open-world recreations of London and San Francisco. A Crash Course can be completed in each of the cities. The Cab Driving School in London follows an extremist view of a London cab driver, where a player must complete objectives in a London cab. The Stunt Driver course in San Francisco allows the player to gain experience in stunt driving for a Hollywood movie, using the Ford Mustang Fastback.

Players can change the visual appearance of the game before starting a race, such as the weather and time of day. Additionally, the frequency of how many cops spawn around the city can be modified, along with the amount of traffic and pedestrians. In Cruise Mode, this can change where the player starts off. Every race or cruise begins with a commentator introducing the course. These commentators would also be heard at the end of a race saying something that depends on the player's position upon finishing. The commentators would be different for each race, and they are different for each of the two cities. The commentators can be turned off. One of the game's most entertaining aspects is its humor; for example, the new age retro hippie in San Francisco singing an out-of-tune variation of the John Lennon song "Give Peace a Chance". In most races and Cruise mode, people in cars and pedestrians can yell comments at players in different languages.

Support for multiplayer gaming via IP address, serial cable, and analogue modem is built-in. Additionally, the game's multiplayer menu includes a link to the MSN Gaming Zone, which offered Midtown Madness 2 lobbies until June 19, 2006. Similar online gaming sites still support multiplayer gaming and also through instant messenger clients. Multiplayer clients use Midtown Madness 2’s built-in DirectPlay support to launch and manage multiplayer sessions. The Cops and Robbers multiplayer mode returns from the previous game, along with new variants.

== Development ==
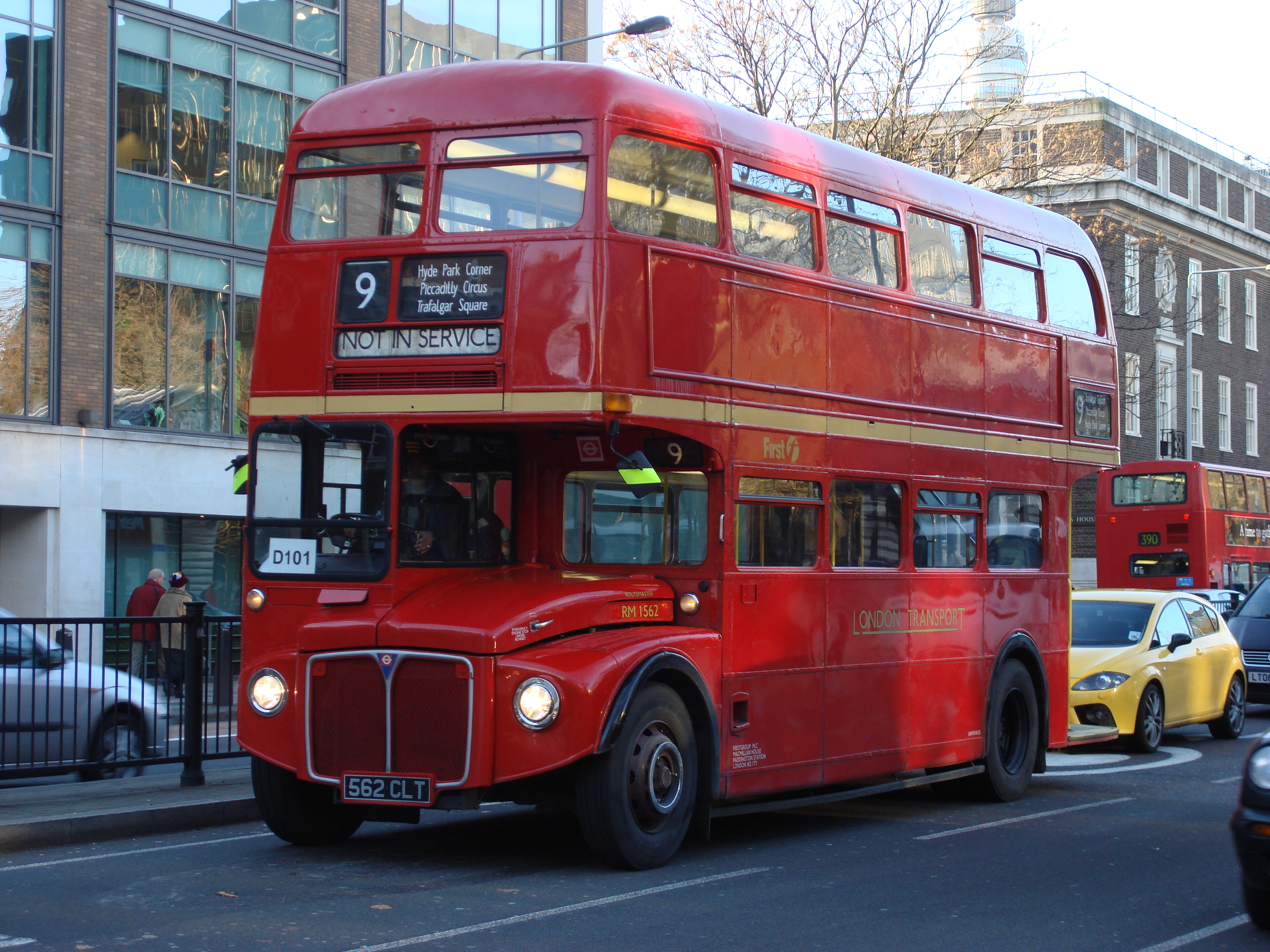
The London Double-decker bus is one of the new vehicles featured in the game.

Midtown Madness 2 was developed by Angel Studios, who developed its predecessor, Midtown Madness and it was the first title to use the AGE (Angel Game Engine).

It was shown at Electronics Entertainment Expo (E3) 2000. A beta test was conducted for an undisclosed amount of time which began on July 7, 2000. Beta discs of the game were sent to participants, and they also went on to receive a full copy of the game upon release. Microsoft announced that the game had gone gold on September 14, 2000. It was released September 21, 2000, in North America, October 6, 2000, in Europe, and December 1, 2000, in Japan.

In a July 2000 interview with IGN, Jay Panek, Producer on Midtown Madness 2, detailed the larger scale of the game. The team wanted to include two very different locales for players to enjoy. San Francisco was chosen for its hills and American-styled grid layout of streets, while London provided many technical turns and occasional narrow roads. Panek described their environments as "caricatures of the cities" rather than map-accurate representations. Famous landmarks can be found in both cities, but each environment is scaled down and simplified. For example, San Francisco features Golden Gate Park and the Golden Gate Bridge itself. The number of races also was greatly increased over its predecessor. Midtown Madness has 64 races, while Midtown Madness 2 has 180.

Microsoft handled licensing for vehicles, including the ability for them to be damaged. British vehicles are prominently featured in the game, including a double-decker bus and offerings from Mini Cooper and Aston Martin. Both British and American vehicles can be driven at both locations. Dan Greenawalt, who would go on to found the Microsoft-owned Forza Motorsport developer Turn 10 Studios, was a tester on the game. In addition to testing he was tasked with tuning vehicle physics. Of his time with the Angel Studios team Greenawalt said "I loved the guys there. [...] I learnt incredibly valuable experiences on that title."

== Reception ==
Reception

Aggregate score
Aggregator	Score
Metacritic	78/100

Review scores
Publication	Score
AllGame	4.5/5
CNET Gamecenter	6/10
Computer Games Strategy Plus	3/5
Computer Gaming World	3.5/5
Edge	6/10
EP Daily	7/10
Eurogamer	9/10
Game Informer	8.25/10
GameRevolution	B
GameSpot	8.1/10
GameSpy	86%
IGN	8.5/10
Next Generation	4/5
PC Gamer (US)	81%

Midtown Madness 2 received "generally favorable reviews" according to the review aggregation website Metacritic. Samuel Bass of NextGen said, "Arcade-style racing at its finest, Midtown Madness 2 deserves a spot in the collection of any true adrenaline junkie."

Opinions were polarized on the game's graphics, with some reviews citing them as dated. The reviewer from Edge stated that the "civilian vehicles are little more than coloured blocks on wheels." Bass also felt the graphics were poor, calling them "frighteningly similar" to the game's predecessor. GamePro's Brian Wright conceded that the ambient traffic vehicles were not detailed, and that building textures were blurry. In contrast he praised the playable vehicles and noted their reflected surfaces and damage models as high points. (Note: GamePro gave the game three 4/5 scores for graphics, sound, and control, and 4.5/5 for fun factor.) The vehicle models were categorized as "quite accurate" by Chris Couper of AllGame, and went on to add that it was "the sort of detail that impresses before the racing even begins".

Gameplay was generally given high marks across reviews, particularly the game's new Crash Course mode. Eurogamer's Tom Bramwell stated they were " tough, feverish challenges which while short-lived stack up and provide infuriatingly addictive gameplay." Wright compared them to Gran Turismo's license tests. He noted that the challenges range from easy to very difficult, but that all were enjoyable. GameSpot's Stephen Poole found them exciting, but noted that they don't provide the same level of thrill as the core races.

Midtown Madness 2 reviewers were mostly favorable towards the game's multiplayer, but criticized the gameplay when latency (lag) was in play. Vincent Lopez of IGN enjoyed the chaotic nature of online play with the statement "fishtailing is king". The reviewer from Edge call the online play a "boon and significant improvement" over Midtown Madness. In speaking of the moments of lag in online multiplayer, Bramwell called it "intolerable for people used to a steady, smooth gaming experience." The high pings that cause lag were also a concern for Poole. Sal Accardo of GameSpy lauded the multiplayer. He stated that there were "few other experiences like this in gaming today. You haven't truly played a racing game until you've driven a double-decker bus straight down Lombard Street; it's just damned FUN."

The game won the award for "Racing Game of 2000" in Readers' Choice, but was a runner-up in Editors' Choice at IGN's Best of 2000 Awards. It was also nominated for the "Best Driving Game for PC" award at The Electric Playground's Blister Awards 2000, which went to Need for Speed: Porsche Unleashed.

== Legacy ==
After the game was released in 2000, Angel Studios ended its partnership with Microsoft. The Midtown Madness series was transferred to Swedish studio DICE, and Midtown Madness 3 was released in 2003. Angel Studios would release Midnight Club: Street Racing and Smuggler's Run a few weeks after Midtown Madness 2, which would be considered the spiritual successors to the Midtown Madness series. Both games would go on to become successes for Angel Studios, Midnight Club eventually becoming its own franchise. Some of the developers of the game remained and worked on the sequel Midtown Madness 3. After that, they would either stay at DICE and work on the Battlefield series or stay at Microsoft.

Midtown Madness 2 was the last racing game published by Microsoft for PCs, until the release of Forza Motorsport 6: Apex in 2016.

Midtown Madness 2 was also the first title to use the AGE (Angel Game Engine) game engine, unlike the ARTS (Angel Real Time Simulation) game engine used by its prequel, Midtown Madness, and which was also used in the Major League Baseball Featuring Ken Griffey Jr. and Slugfest games developed by Angel Studios. This game engine later evolved and was renamed RAGE (Rockstar Advanced Game Engine) and became the cornerstone of today's modern Rockstar Games titles.
