= Rockstar Advanced Game Engine =

Proprietary game engine

- The city of Los Santos, as seen in Grand Theft Auto V: The game makes use of RAGE's many graphical features, such as depth of field, high draw distance and detailed weather effects.
- Developer: RAGE Technology Group (Rockstar San Diego)
- Middleware: Bink Video; Bullet; Euphoria
- Platform: Android; iOS; macOS; Nintendo Switch; Nintendo Switch 2; PlayStation 3; PlayStation 4; PlayStation 5; Xbox 360; Xbox One; Xbox Series X/S; Stadia; Wii; Windows
- Predecessor: Angel Game Engine
- License: Proprietary

The Rockstar Advanced Game Engine (RAGE) is a proprietary game engine of Rockstar Games, developed by the RAGE Technology Group division of Rockstar San Diego (formerly Angel Studios), based on the Angel Game Engine. Since its first game, Rockstar Games Presents Table Tennis in 2006, released for the Xbox 360 and Wii, the engine has been used by Rockstar Games's internal studios to develop advanced open world games for computers and consoles.

== History ==
=== Early History ===
Angel Studios previously used the game engine Angel Real Time Simulation (ARTS) for Major League Baseball Featuring Ken Griffey Jr. (1998) and Midtown Madness (1999). The following year, Angel Studios developed Midtown Madness 2 (2000), the first title to use the new Angel Game Engine (AGE). In 2002, Angel Studios was sold to Take-Two Interactive, moved under Rockstar Games, and rebranded Rockstar San Diego. This sale also included AGE, later renamed the Rockstar Advanced Game Engine (RAGE).

=== Development ===
Prior to developing RAGE, Rockstar Games mostly used Criterion Games's RenderWare engine to develop games for PlayStation 2, Windows, and Xbox, such as the early 3D installments in the Grand Theft Auto franchise. In 2004, Criterion Games was acquired by Electronic Arts, which led Rockstar Games to switch from RenderWare and open RAGE Technology Group as a division of Rockstar San Diego. RAGE Technology Group started developing what would later become RAGE, based on Rockstar San Diego's AGE. The engine would facilitate game development on Windows and seventh generation consoles. The first game to use the engine was Rockstar San Diego's Rockstar Games Presents Table Tennis, released for Xbox 360 on May 23, 2006 and ported to the Wii more than a year later. Since then, RAGE integrates the third-party middleware components Euphoria and Bullet, as character animation engine and physics engine, respectively.

On PlayStation 3 and Xbox 360, RAGE often saw a disparity in the optimization on the hardware: major titles on PlayStation 3 usually had lower resolution and minor graphic effects, as in Grand Theft Auto IV (720p vs. 640p), in Midnight Club: Los Angeles (1280×720p vs. 960×720p) and in Red Dead Redemption (720p vs. 640p). Despite its problems in optimization equality, in July 2009, Chris Stead of IGN voted RAGE as one of the "10 Best Game Engines of [the 7th] Generation", saying: "RAGE's strengths are many. Its ability to handle large streaming worlds, complex A.I. arrangements, weather effects, fast network code and a multitude of gameplay styles will be obvious to anyone who has played GTA IV."

Since the release of Max Payne 3, the engine supports DirectX 11 and stereoscopic 3D rendering for personal computers. Max Payne 3 also marked the first time in which RAGE was capable of rendering the same 720p resolution on a game, both on PlayStation 3 and Xbox 360.

For the remastered versions of Grand Theft Auto V, RAGE was reworked for the eighth generation of video game consoles, with 1080p resolution support for both the PlayStation 4 and Xbox One. The PC version of the game, released in 2015, showed RAGE supporting 4K resolution and frame rates at 60 frames per second, as well as more powerful draw distances, texture filtering, and improved shadow mapping and tessellation quality.

RAGE would later be further refined with the release of Red Dead Redemption 2 in 2018, supporting physically based rendering, volumetric clouds and fog values, pre-calculated global illumination as well as a Vulkan renderer in the Windows version in addition to DirectX 12. The Euphoria engine was overhauled to create advanced AI as well as enhanced physics and animations for the game. HDR support was added in May 2019. Support for Nvidia's Deep Learning Super Sampling (DLSS) was added in July 2021, while support for AMD's FidelityFX Super Resolution (FSR) was added by September 2022.

The 2022 release of Grand Theft Auto V for the ninth generation of video game consoles introduced several enhancements, incorporating features from later RAGE titles. Raytraced reflections and shadows, native 4K resolution on the PlayStation 5 and Xbox Series X, upscaled 4K on the Xbox Series S, as well as HDR support were added. In 2025 these features were extended further with the release of Grand Theft Auto V Enhanced on PC which introduced real-time raytraced global illumination and raytraced ambient occlusion, as well as support for DLSS and FSR. Grand Theft Auto VI in 2026 featured numerous significant upgrades to the engine, which will serve as a technological, structural, and operational foundation for future games; Rockstar hopes that these new systems will enable shorter development cycles and faster releases.

== Games using RAGE ==
Year	Title	Platform(s)	Developer(s)
2006	Rockstar Games Presents Table Tennis	Wii, Xbox 360	Rockstar San Diego
2008	Grand Theft Auto IV	PlayStation 3, Windows, Xbox 360	Rockstar North
2008	Midnight Club: Los Angeles	PlayStation 3, Xbox 360	Rockstar San Diego
2009	Grand Theft Auto IV: The Lost and Damned	PlayStation 3, Windows, Xbox 360	Rockstar North
2009	Grand Theft Auto: The Ballad of Gay Tony	PlayStation 3, Windows, Xbox 360	Rockstar North
2010	Red Dead Redemption	Android, iOS, Nintendo Switch, Nintendo Switch 2, PlayStation 3, PlayStation 4, PlayStation 5, Windows, Xbox 360, Xbox Series X/S	Rockstar San Diego
2010	Red Dead Redemption: Undead Nightmare	Android, iOS, Nintendo Switch, Nintendo Switch 2, PlayStation 3, PlayStation 4, PlayStation 5, Windows, Xbox 360, Xbox Series X/S	Rockstar San Diego
2012	Max Payne 3	OS X, PlayStation 3, Windows, Xbox 360	Rockstar Studios
2013	Grand Theft Auto V	PlayStation 3, PlayStation 4, PlayStation 5, Windows, Xbox 360, Xbox One, Xbox Series X/S	Rockstar North
2018	Red Dead Redemption 2	PlayStation 4, Stadia, Windows, Xbox One	Rockstar Games
2026	Grand Theft Auto VI	PlayStation 5, Xbox Series X/S	Rockstar Games
