= Ken Griffey Jr.'s Slugfest =

1999 baseball video game

- North American Nintendo 64 box art
- Developers: Angel Studios (N64); Software Creations (GBC)
- Publisher: Nintendo of America
- Directors: Nintendo 64; Steve Reed
- Producers: Nintendo 64; Diego Angel; Shigeki Yamashiro; Game Boy Color; Dave Mac; Henry C. Sterchi
- Designers: Nintendo 64; Shigeki Yamashiro
- Programmers: Nintendo 64; Charles T. Eubanks; Game Boy Color; Brian Beuken; Jas C. Brooke; Stephen Ruddy; Danny Whelan
- Artists: Game Boy Color; Col Rodgers
- Composers: Nintendo 64; Jay Levorson; Game Boy Color; Suddi Raval
- Platforms: Nintendo 64, Game Boy Color
- Release: Nintendo 64: NA: May 10, 1999; Game Boy Color: NA: June 3, 1999
- Genre: Sports
- Modes: Single-player, multiplayer

Ken Griffey Jr.'s Slugfest is a 1999 baseball video game developed by Angel Studios and published by Nintendo for the Nintendo 64. It was released in May 1999 only in North America. A Game Boy Color port developed by Software Creations was released in June 1999. Featuring real-life player Ken Griffey Jr., it is a sequel to Major League Baseball Featuring Ken Griffey Jr., released for the Nintendo 64, which itself was preceded by Software Creation's Ken Griffey Jr. Presents Major League Baseball and Rare's Ken Griffey Jr.'s Winning Run, both released for the Super NES.

This version of the game contains actual player names, unlike the original. It contains Season, Exhibition, World Series and Home Run Derby modes.

== Gameplay ==
Ken Griffey Jr.'s Slugfest was the second Ken Griffey Jr. game to use 3D computer graphics.

The batting feature in this game is set up differently from most other baseball video games. The batter is given an elongated oval shape to control and in order for the batter to make contact with the ball, he must wait for the pitch location and then move the oval to the location of the pitch to make contact. Each batter will have a different sized oval or hitting zone depending on how strong of a hitter he is. This feature was originally developed in Major League Baseball Featuring Ken Griffey Jr. and carried over into this game with slight modifications.

The fielding portion of this game makes use of the c-directional pad on the Nintendo 64 controller. As a fielder, you must run to the ball using the analog stick and then choose the correct c-button for the base to which you would like to throw. The controller has four c-buttons: c-up, c-left, c-right, and c-down and each of these represent a different base. Each c-button represents the base that would correspond with its location on the controller. For example, c-right represents first base, c-up represents second base, c-left represents third base, and c-down represents home plate.

This game uses simple controls for pitching that are very similar to the controls of other baseball video games of the time. Before the pitch, there will be a menu that will show all available pitches that the pitcher can throw. In order to throw a certain pitch, you must press the button that is next to the pitch you would like to throw. The strike zone will be shown by a white rectangular box and any pitch that is located in the box will be a strike. Also, while the ball is being thrown, the pitcher may use the analog stick to move the pitch in any direction. There are several different pitches that can be thrown. They are: fastball, super fastball, change up, super change up, knuckleball, curveball, slider, and screwball. Every pitcher has his own unique set of pitches and no pitcher can throw all the pitches. The speed of the pitches can range anywhere from 37 mph to 103 mph.

This game allows the player to select pitchers of a team from the bullpen or rotation. This game also allows the player to select different pitches to be thrown, based on each real life pitchers' abilities. The player of this game may create custom baseball players with different pitches, size, strength, and stamina. The player may also select the team, stadium, and choose between day or night and home or away games.

== Development ==
Ken Griffey Jr.'s Slugfest was developed in under one year. The game had a marketing budget of $3.5 million.

== Reception ==
Reception

Aggregate score
Aggregator	Score	
Aggregator	GBC	N64
GameRankings	57%	77%

Review scores
Publication	Score	
Publication	GBC	N64
AllGame	4.5/5	N/A
CNET Gamecenter	N/A	8/10
Electronic Gaming Monthly	N/A	6.75/10 (Note: Four critics of Electronic Gaming Monthly gave the Nintendo 64 version each a score of 8/10, 7/10, 6.5/10, and 5.5/10.)
EP Daily	2/10	7.5/10
Game Informer	5.25/10	8.5/10
GameRevolution	N/A	B−
GameSpot	N/A	7.8/10
Hyper	N/A	81%
IGN	4/10	7.9/10
Next Generation	N/A	4/5
Nintendo Power	7.3/10	7.7/10
The Cincinnati Enquirer	N/A	3/4

The Nintendo 64 version received favorable reviews, while the Game Boy Color version received mixed reviews, according to the review aggregation website GameRankings. Next Generation called the former version "one of the best arcade baseball titles in a while. Sure, the graphics pale in comparison to Acclaim's All-Star Baseball 2000, and realism is notably absent, but if you're more concerned about white-knuckled multiplayer games and .500 batting averages than pitching duels and squeeze plays, this is your game." GamePro said of the game, "If you're a younger gamer or new to baseball, give Slugfest a whirl. It's more arcadey than the sim-intensive All Star [Baseball] 2000 and [it] will appeal to those who want a quick baseball fix rather than a game filled with intense pitcher/batter confrontations." (Note: GamePro gave the Nintendo 64 version 4/5 for graphics, two 3.5/5 scores for sound and fun factor, and 3/5 for control.)
