= Ken Griffey Jr. Presents Major League Baseball =

1994 baseball video game

- Front cover
- Developer: Software Creations
- Publisher: Nintendo
- Producer: Brian Ullrich
- Designer: Brian Ullrich
- Programmers: Kevin Edwards; Stephen Ruddy
- Artist: Ste Pickford
- Composers: Chris Jojo; Matthew Cannon; Paul Tonge; Tim Follin; Geoff Follin
- Platforms: Super Nintendo Entertainment System, Game Boy
- Release: NA: March 1994; Game Boy: NA: 1997
- Genre: Sports
- Modes: Single-player, multiplayer

Ken Griffey Jr. Presents Major League Baseball is a 1994 baseball video game developed by Software Creations and published by Nintendo for the Super Nintendo Entertainment System. A Game Boy version was released in 1997. The game has a Major League Baseball (MLB) license but not a Major League Baseball Players Association (MLBPA) license, meaning that the game has real stadiums and real teams, but not real players (except Ken Griffey Jr.). The fictitious players have the same statistics as their real-world counterparts, and the game comes with a name-changing feature that allows players to change the athletes' names. Nintendo released a portable version of the game in 1997 for the Game Boy with real players and stats from the 1996 season. The gameplay is similar to its predecessors, though it is sometimes sluggish due to hardware restrictions. The SNES version came with a promotional Griffey collector's card packed inside. It is often rated by the public as one of the best baseball games of all time.

== Gameplay ==
The game was groundbreaking and had a long list of features for its time. The game featured statistics from the real-life 1993 MLB season, and also kept statistics for the team controlled by the user throughout a season, though all of the statistics of CPU-controlled teams remained unchanged. The team rosters are based on the 1993 MLB season, with stats included.

Nearly every team has its own venue, sometimes complete with unique features, including Dodger Stadium's "slants" by the outfield crowd (the outfield "roof"), Shea Stadium's minuscule center field crowd, and the large scoreboard in the right field of Comiskey Park. Due to cartridge space limitations, some stadiums could not be added, and in those cases a generic stadium with green or blue walls is used (this layout was mostly used for the concrete donuts such as Riverfront Stadium and Three Rivers Stadium, themselves noted for being generic). Some of the stadiums are particularly realistic; Fenway Park's trademark Green Monster is in the game, as is Joe Robbie Stadium's teal wall and Oriole Park at Camden Yards' trademark Warehouse in right field. The Cincinnati Reds have a blue outfield wall as opposed to their signature green wall at Riverfront Stadium.

The Kansas City Royals and Chicago White Sox are the only two teams to play night games at their respective ball parks. Kauffman Stadium features its signature water falls in the outfield and signature scoreboard in Center Field. Both Yankee Stadium and Tiger Stadium are almost identical except that Yankee Stadium has shorter right field bleachers and the ball can be hit out of the park while Tiger Stadium has an upper deck all the way around. Toronto's SkyDome hotel/restaurant are visible in play if a homerun heads to center field. Wrigley Field has its signature Ivy on the outfield wall but is missing the apartment houses in left and right field respectively and the manual operated scoreboard in center field. The Kingdome has its signature large right field wall, as does the Metrodome.

The Philadelphia Phillies are the only team to play in the generic stadium with astroturf and the green outfield wall. The Colorado Rockies, San Francisco Giants, and the Oakland Athletics are the only teams to play in the generic stadium with natural grass and the green outfield wall. The Pittsburgh Pirates, St. Louis Cardinals, Houston Astros, Montreal Expos, and Cincinnati Reds are the only teams to play in the generic stadium with astroturf and have a blue outfield wall. The Atlanta Braves, Milwaukee Brewers, San Diego Padres, and California Angels are the only teams to play in a generic stadium with natural grass and a blue outfield wall.

The Chicago White Sox wear their black alternate top as their home uniform in the game. The Los Angeles Dodgers have a player on the bench, Lou Graves (actually Darryl Strawberry), who is known for timely home runs in clutch situations; he is often substituted in at shortstop.

Pitching is one of the simplest elements in this game. There is also a battery-backed season mode, where players can select a team to play for 26, 78, or all 162 games. Players who finish first in their division earn a playoff berth and a chance to play in the World Series. Unique to the game was the ability to choose playing a season using a system of either four or six divisions, as the game was released after the six division system was proposed for MLB, but before the first MLB season with six divisions (1994).

The game also features the five new logos and uniforms designs of the Houston Astros, Milwaukee Brewers, San Francisco Giants, Texas Rangers, and the Detroit Tigers compared to what they looked like in 1993. The game also features the new ballparks The Ballpark in Arlington (home ballpark of the Rangers), and Jacobs Field (home ballpark of the Cleveland Indians), which replaced Arlington Stadium and Cleveland Stadium, respectively.

== Features ==
Fictitious players in the game are themed with their teammates. Some of the themes include:

- The Atlanta Braves are famous dance DJs, such as Sasha & Digweed who stand in for starting pitcher John Smoltz and closer Mike Stanton. Tony Humphries stands in for middle relief pitcher Jay Howell, Grant Park, fills in for pitcher Steve Avery. C. Edwards stands in for pitcher Tom Glavine, D. Chapman stands in for rightfielder David Justice, A. Barker stands in for ace pitcher Greg Maddux, J.Evans stands in for leftfielder Ron Gant, M. Larson is utility player Francisco Cabrera, D. Neon stands in for Deion Sanders and D. Crime stands in for first baseman Fred McGriff.
- The Baltimore Orioles pay tribute to Baltimore native John Waters who stands in for Cal Ripken Jr., B. Divine filling in for second baseman Harold Reynolds, P. Flamingo standing in for pitcher Mike Mussina, M. Trasho standing in for third baseman Mike Pagliarulo, Cry-Baby stands in for catcher Chris Hoiles, Pepper Walker stands in for middle reliever Todd Frohwirth, Ramona Rickettes stands in for outfielder Brady Anderson, Female Trouble stands in for infielder Mark McLemore, H. Spray standing in for middle relief pitcher Jim Poole, Mink Stole stands in for catcher Mark Parent, C. Mueller stands in for infielder Leo Gomez, E. Massey stands in for pitcher Fernando Valenzuela, A. Hayes stands in for outfielder Lonnie Smith, and M. Maniac stands in for closer Gregg Olson.
- The Boston Red Sox contain members from the show Cheers. Cliff Claven stands in for middle reliver Scott Bankhead, Norm Peterson stands in for pitcher Greg Harris, Sam Malone fills in for closer Jeff Russell. Also included are Boston landmarks B. Common standing in for utility second baseman Luis Rivera and M. Harvard filling in for catcher Tony Peña and figures from early American history J. Adams who fills in for outfielder Billy Hatcher, J. Hancock stands in for Rob Deer, A.Burr stands in for first baseman Mo Vaughn, A. Hamilton for infielder Scott Fletcher and S. Heat stands in for flamethrower Roger Clemens.
- The California Angels have famous actors on their team: F. Astaire stands in for outfielder Chad Curtis, H. Bogart stands in for Designated Hitter Chili Davis, M. Brando fills in for outfielder Tim Salmon, J. Dean fills in for shortstop Gary Disarcina, C. Heston stands in for catcher Chris Turner (baseball) J. Huston stands in for ace starting pitcher Mark Langston, R. Mitchum stands in for second baseman Damion Easley, J. Cagney stands in for utility infielder Torey Lovullo, S. Connery stands in for utility infielder Rod Correia and J. Wayne fills in for first baseman J. T. Snow.
- The Chicago Cubs has game director Brian Ullrich standing in for second baseman Ryne Sandberg. The bullpen has some seemingly generic names, such as P. Drifter who fills in for pitcher Jose Guzman, T. Yokel who fills in for pitcher Frank Castillo, E. Crash stands in for outfielder Sammy Sosa, D. Liscombe stands in for first baseman Mark Grace, M. Bettah stands in for catcher Rick Wilkins, E. Larouche stands in for closer Randy Myers, B. Bambam stands in for outfielder Kevin Roberson, S. Flash stands in for infielder/outfielder Eric Yelding, K. Costello stands in for third baseman Steve Buechele, P. Denton stands in for outfielder Willie Wilson and R. Steel filling in for middle relief pitcher Dan Plesac. An Athletic interview with Brian Ullrich from April 2020 revealed the Cubs' names came from "players that Ullrich and his buddies had created in TV Sports: Football."
- The Chicago White Sox are former basketball players from St. John's University: M. Sealy fills in for shortstop Ozzie Guillén, C. Mullin fills in for Ellis Burks, Billy Goodwin stands in for starting pitcher Jack McDowell, B. Wennigton stands in for pitcher Scott Radinsky, J. Scott stands in for pitcher Alex Fernandez, R. Werdann stands in for pitcher Wilson Alvarez, U. Josh stands for power slugger and first baseman Frank Thomas, David Russell stands in for outfielder Tim Raines, B. Harvey stands in for second baseman Joey Cora, W. Berry stands in for third baseman Robin Ventura, S. Jones stands in for outfielder Bo Jackson, Willie Glass stands in for Designated Hitter George Bell (outfielder), Lou Carnesecca stands in for closer Roberto Hernandez, and M. Jackson stands in for centerfielder Lance Johnson.
- The Cincinnati Reds are writers: B. Stoker stands in for pitcher Tom Browning, I. Fleming stands in for ace flamethrower José Rijo, P. Dick stands in for middle reliever Scott Service, Z. Grey stands in for closer Rob Dibble, A. Christie stands in for pitcher John Smiley, H. Ellison stands in for outfielder Kevin Mitchell, Jim Thompson stands in for infielder Bip Roberts, and E. Queen fills in for third baseman Chris Sabo.
- The Cleveland Indians have famous actresses and glamour girls on their team: A. Margret fills in for Paul Sorrento, A. Hepburn stands in for catcher Sandy Alomar Jr., M. Monroe fills in for outfielder Reggie Jefferson, N. Wood stands in for pitcher Charles Nagy, T. Satana stands in for utility infielder Jeff Treadway, Haji stands in for catcher Junior Ortiz, D. Paget stands in for outfielder Manny Ramirez, L. Stcyr stands in for infielder Jim Thome, D. Dors stands in for middle reliever Derek Lilliquist, T. Storm stands in for closer Eric Plunk and G. Garbo stands in for pitcher Jeff Mutis.
- The Colorado Rockies contain famous names from horror movies, including G. Romero who fills in for pitcher Kent Bottenfield, B. Lugosi who fills in for outfielder Alex Cole, S. King who fills in for utility infielder Roberto Mejia, T. Fisher who fills in for infielder Pedro Castellano, H. Lewis stands in for pitcher Armando Reynoso, T. Savini fills in for middle relief pitcher Bruce Ruffin, L. Chaney stands in for Andres Galarraga and B. Karloff stands in for Dante Bichette.
- The Detroit Tigers are famous Motown singers: A. Franklin stands in for pitcher John Doherty, C. Calloway stands in for first baseman Cecil Fielder, G. Knight stands in for pitcher Bill Gullickson, O. Redding stands in for second baseman Lou Whitaker, J. Hooker stands in for third baseman Travis Fryman, J. Brown stands in for outfielder Eric Davis, The Stooges stands in for closer Mike Henneman, I. Hayes stands in for shortstop Alan Trammell, W. Pickett stands in for Kirk Gibson, W. Bell stands in for outfielder Milt Cuyler, B. King stands in for catcher/outfielder Mickey Tettleton and R. Smokey stands in for outfielder Gary Thurman.
- The Florida Marlins roster has random names with no known common bond or claim to fame. R. Harrison fills in for third baseman Gary Sheffield, H. Lo fills in for utility player Gus Polidor, R. Crombie fills in for outfielder Greg Briley, R. Thompson stands in for pitcher Jack Armstrong (baseball), R. Richards fills in for Matias Carrillo and L. Vogelman fills in for outfielder Jeff Conine. The pitching staff includes S. McDonald standing in for middle reliever Robb Nen, J. Bafus standing in for knuckleballer Charlie Hough, and G. Valkenar standing in for closer Bryan Harvey. An Athletic article from April 2020 with the game's director, Brian Ullrich, revealed the Marlins are named after Ullrich's elementary school classmates from Spokane, Washington.
- The Houston Astros are cartoonists: G. Larson fills in for pitcher Todd Jones, W. Eisner fills in for second baseman Craig Biggio, J. Kirby stands in for first baseman Jeff Bagwell, B. Ewins stands in for pitcher Darryl Kile, F. Miller fills in for infielder Casey Candaele, B. Edlund fills in for starting pitcher Pete Harnisch, R. Crumb stands in for shortstop Jose Uribe, H. Kurtzman stands in for third baseman Ken Caminiti, W. Elder stands in for catcher Eddie Taubensee, H. Chaykin stands in for pitcher Mark Portugal, R. Williams stands in for outfielder Chris James, and S. Lee stands in for Rick Parker.
- The Kansas City Royals are based on U.S. presidents. D. Ike, whose real-life counterpart is Hall of Famer George Brett, L. Johnson stands in for utility infielder Rico Rossy, T. Roosevelt stands in for infielder Craig Wilson, C. Coolidge stands in for closer Jeff Montgomery, G. Ford stands in for middle reliever Tom Gordon, B. Clinton standing in for Kevin Appier, George H. W. Bush standing in for David Cone, Grover Cleveland stands in for first baseman Wally Joyner, and R. Reagan standing in for Hipólito Pichardo.
- The Los Angeles Dodgers are based on punk rock pioneers from Los Angeles and other areas around California including Exene Cervenka who fills in for infielder José Offerman, John Doe stands in for catcher Mike Piazza, DJ Bonebrake of X fills in for outfielder Brett Butler, Poison Ivy stands in for outfielder Mitch Webster, Lux Interior of The Cramps fills in for first baseman Eric Karros, Jello Biafra fills in for middle reliever Ricky Trlicek, Klaus Flouride of the Dead Kennedys stands in for pitcher Pedro Astacio, Alice Bag stands in for utility outfielder Raul Mondesi, B. Rodney stands in for outfielder Henry Rodriguez, N. Knox stands in for outfielder Cory Snyder, H. Rollins stands in for middle reliever Pedro Martinez, D.Crash stands in for closer Jim Gott, and Lee Ving of Fear fills in for ace pitcher Orel Hershiser.
- The Milwaukee Brewers have a pitching staff consisting of superhero "secret identities": P. Parker fills in for pitcher Cal Eldred, C. Kent fills in for pitcher Jaime Navarro, Thing stands in for middle reliever Matt Maysey and B. Wayne fills in for Ricky Bones, while their position players are fictional secret agents and detectives: J. Rockford fills in for infielder Pat Listach, S. Templar stands in for outfielder Robin Yount, J. Steed stands in for power hitter Greg Vaughn, J. Bond stands in for catcher Dave Nilsson, N. Solo stands in for catcher/third baseman B.J. Surhoff, and P. Marlowe stands in for infielder Bill Spiers.
- The Minnesota Twins are not named for famous sets of twins. Instead, The players' names are based on celebrities of various backgrounds from actor A. West who fills in for first baseman Kent Hrbek, guitarist J. Hendrix who fills in for Designated Hitter Dave Winfield, M. Kidder fills in for starting pitcher Kevin Tapani, Y. De Carlo stands in for middle reliever Larry Casian, J. Zacherle stands in for centerfielder Kirby Puckett, Y. Brynner stands in for second baseman Chuck Knoblauch, J. Coogan stands in for leftfielder Shane Mack, and filmmaker W. Herzog is closer Rick Aguilera.
- The Montreal Expos are people from the 1980s music scene in Manchester, England, including B. Summer filling in for outfielder Moisés Alou, S. Morrissey fills in for outfielder John Vander Wal, M.Vita stands in for ace pitcher Dennis Martinez, S.Ravel stands in for infielder Wil Cordero, P. Hook fills in for catcher Darrin Fletcher P. Shelley fills in for pitcher Jeff Fassero, H. Devoto fills in for pitcher Kirk Rueter, I. Brown fills in for infielder Delino DeShields, I. Curtis stands in for outfielder Rondell White, A.Miah stands in for closer John Wetteland, and J. Marr for slugger Larry Walker.
- The New York Mets are based on punk rock pioneers from New York City including Johnny Thunders filling in for first baseman Eddie Murray, Joey Ramone standing in for second baseman Jeff Kent, Tom Verlaine for outfielder Bobby Bonilla, A. Vega filling in for utility catcher Charlie O'Brien, L. Reed stands in for utility infielder Chico Walker, D. Manitoba stands in for outfielder Ryan Thompson, D. Harry stands in for pitcher Dwight Gooden, A. Shernoff stands in for utility infielder Doug Saunders, M.Rev stands in for outfielder Joe Orsulak, H. Richard stands in for infielder Howard Johnson, and Jerry Nolan stands in for middle relief pitcher Anthony Young.
- The New York Yankees have the nicknames of famous Yankee greats, such as Bambino standing for slugger Danny Tartabull, Whitey Ford in for pitcher Jimmy Key, M. Thurman standing in for catcher Mike Stanley and New York boroughs such as S. Island for infielder Spike Owen. H. Line stands in for utility infielder Kevin Maas, I. Horse stands in for first baseman Don Mattingly, E. River stands in for closer Lee Smith, T. Bronx stands in for catcher Matt Nokes, and C. Island stands in for middle reliever Paul Assenmacher.
- The Oakland Athletics apparently hired more authors: H. Ernest standing in for first baseman Mark McGwire, L. Byron in for outfielder Mike Aldrete, H. Thompson in for utility catcher/infielder Scott Hemond, M. Twain in for second baseman Brent Gates, L. Tolstoy in for outfielder Dave Henderson, J.Carroll stands in for outfielder Lance Blankenship, J.Milton stands in for infieder Marcos Armas, J. Kerouac stands in for middle reliever Rich Gossage, G. Stein stands in for third baseman Craig Paquette, C. Sandburg stands in for pitcher Todd Van Poppel, G. Chaucer stands in for outfielder Scott Lydy, and C. Bukowski fills in for ace closer Dennis Eckersley.
- The Philadelphia Phillies feature a Rocky homage in R. Balboa who fills in for catcher Darren Daulton and A. Creed who stands in for third baseman Dave Hollins. They also have a Philadelphia landmark – L. Bell filling in for utility first baseman Ricky Jordan, T. Perry stands in for starting pitcher Curt Schilling, D. Love stands in for centerfielder Lenny Dykstra, B. Medley standing in for outfielder Wes Chamberlain, P. Spector stands in for first baseman John Kruk, T. Crystals stands in for infielder Mickey Morandini, and F. Albert stands in for ace closer Mitch Williams.
- The Pittsburgh Pirates are named after characters from the soap opera Coronation Street. E. Bishop who fills in for pitcher Steve Cooke, K. Barlow is infielder Tom Foley, E. Sharples stands in for middle reliever Paul Wagner, A. Roberts stands in for outfielder Lloyd McClendon, D.Barnes stands in for pitcher Bob Walk, R. Holdsworth stands in for infielder Jeff King (baseball), C.Watts stands in for shortstop Jay Bell, Mike Baldwin (Coronation Street) stands in for first baseman Kevin Young (baseball), H. Ogden stands in for knuckleball pitcher Tim Wakefield and P. Pearce is outfielder Lonnie Smith.
- The San Francisco Giants are members of Software Creations, the team that developed the game. Michael Webb stands in for outfielder Willie McGee, Richard Kay stands in for catcher Kirt Manwaring, Ste Pickford stands in for power-slugger Barry Bonds. John Pickford stands in for ace pitcher John Burkett. Stephen Ruddy stands in for first baseman Will Clark, Kevin Edwards stands in for third baseman Matt Williams, John Tatlock stands in for utility infielder Rikkert Faneyte, Mark Daglish stands in for closer Rod Beck, and Martin Holland stands in for infielder Mike Benjamin.
- The San Diego Padres are based on punk rock pioneers from England including B. Idol who stands in for infielder Ricky Gutiérrez, D. Vanian who fills in for outfielder Derek Bell, Johnny Rotten fills in for infielder Jeff Gardner, F. Fife fills in for utility hitter Luis Lopez, C. Sensible stands in for slugger Phil Plantier, P. Cook stands in for backup catcher Brad Ausmus, J. Pursey fills in for first baseman Guillermo Velasquez, S. Sioux fills in for catcher Kevin Higgins and Sid Vicious fills in for infielder Archi Cianfrocco.
- The Seattle Mariners include Ken Griffey Jr. himself, the only active MLB player from the era to be included; his name cannot be changed. The other player names are of Nintendo of America employees such as J. Tingdale who stands in for ace pitcher Randy Johnson, D. Owsen who stands in for shortstop Omar Vizquel, and J. Hutt filling in for outfielder Jay Buhner. K. Tofte, a relative of Los Angeles realtor Tracy Tofte's ex-husband (formerly Tracy Wells of Mr. Belvedere), fills in for pitcher Erik Hanson.
- The St. Louis Cardinals are based on famous comedians: H. Moe fills in for ace pitcher Bob Tewksbury, M. Berle stands in for middle relief pitcher Todd Burns, O. Hardy stands in for shortstop Ozzie Smith, G. Marx fills in for first baseman Gregg Jefferies, G. Burns fills in for infielder Gerónimo Peña, B. Cosby stands in for outfielder Gerald Perry, C. Chaplin stands in for middle reliever Les Lancaster and Buster Keaton fills in for power slugger Mark Whiten.
- The Texas Rangers, appropriately, have a Western theme. T. Mix, fills in for pitcher Kevin Brown, S. Jackson stands in for ace pitcher Nolan Ryan, W. Earp stands in for slugger Jose Canseco, J. James stands in for infielder Doug Strange, P. Villa stands in for Shortstop Mario Diaz, U. Todd stands in for first baseman Rafael Palmeiro, D. Varyu stands in for power slugger and outfielder Juan Gonzalez, B. Hickock stands in for third baseman Dean Palmer, and R. Lee stands in for catcher Iván Rodríguez.
- The Toronto Blue Jays are players from the Wigan Warriors Rugby league team: E. Hanley fills in for infielder Darnell Coles, J. Monie stands in for speedster Rickey Henderson, W. Jack stands in for outfielder Joe Carter, J. Eck stands in for closer Duane Ward, S. Sales stands in for second baseman Roberto Alomar, M. Offiah fills in for middle reliever Danny Cox, B. Mather stands in for starting pitcher Juan Guzman, M. Dermott stands in for pitcher Pat Hentgen, K. Skerrett stands in for first baseman John Olerud, A. Platt stands in for utility infielder Alfredo Griffin, and D. Betts fills in for Paul Molitor.

At the end of every game, the game provides box scores and scoring summaries in newspaper format, providing a humorous newspaper headline on other goings-on in the world of Major League Baseball.

The game has several other features, including a home run derby (SNES version only) in which players practice their power hitting against either Ken Griffey Jr. or against one of five fictitious power batters - Warren Track, Barny Tater, Sammy Scrap, Can O' Corn and Nick Noheart.

The game features the voice of former MLB umpire Steve Palermo for called strikes, balls and outs.

The game's other vocal soundbite, that of a batter turning to the umpire and screaming "Oh come on!" after a called strike three was sampled from a Jim Belushi line in the 1985 movie The Man With One Red Shoe.

== Bugs ==
Due to a bug, during a full season some home run totals for players reset to zero after the All-Star game. A Nintendo Customer Service representative acknowledged this bug, further claimed that sometimes during the World Series players are prevented from using their best pitchers, and bluntly summarized, "Ken Griffey Jr. Baseball sports some pretty serious bugs."

Saved information, such as edited player names or seasons, are known to erase unexpectedly.

== Game Boy version ==
Screenshot of the Game Boy version

The game was released in 1997 for the Game Boy, with Super Game Boy capabilities. Due to cartridge space, there is only one stadium. Unlike its predecessor, the Game Boy port's players have stats from the 1996 season, but they play in the 1997 season. It also has both a Major League Baseball and a Major League Baseball Players Association license- a first for a Ken Griffey Jr. game on a Nintendo console. The home run derby mode from the SNES version was removed from this version. 1997 Rookies of the Year Scott Rolen and Nomar Garciaparra debut in this game, along with Deivi Cruz. The Game Boy and Game Boy Color versions of the game were developed by programmer Brian Beuken, who was working freelance for Software Creations at the time.

== Reception ==
Reception

Aggregate score
Aggregator	Score
GameRankings	75%

Review scores
Publication	Score
Electronic Gaming Monthly	6.6/10
GameFan	84%
Nintendo Power	3.775/5 (Note: Nintendo Power scored Ken Griffey Jr. Presents Major League Baseball 4.3/5 for graphics/sound, 3.8 for challenge, and 3.5/5 twice for play control and theme/fun.)
Video Games (DE)	84%

Ken Griffey Jr. Presents Major League Baseball received generally mixed reviews. GamePro heavily criticized the game's lack of realism, citing the fictitious players, inaccurate ballparks, inability to adjust defense, "stylized" player sprites, and the ability to control the ball even after it leaves the pitcher's hand. However, they acknowledged the game has good music, "one of the best manuals for a baseball game", and gameplay that is very accessible to beginners. Electronic Gaming Monthly criticized that the computer is too difficult to beat in one-player mode, but praised the digitized voices of Steve Palermo and Jack Buck and the general playability. They scored the game a 6.6 out of 10. In 2018, Complex ranked the game 91st in their "The Best Super Nintendo Games of All Time".

By July 1994, the game sold 750,000 copies. The game ultimately sold 1.2 million units.

== Legacy ==
Nintendo later published three more games featuring Ken Griffey Jr., one developed by Rare and two developed by Angel Studios.

- Ken Griffey Jr.'s Winning Run
- Major League Baseball Featuring Ken Griffey Jr.
- Ken Griffey Jr.'s Slugfest

Entries in the MLB: The Show series have included a "Retro Mode" the emulates the gameplay of Ken Griffey Jr. Presents Major League Baseball, complete with music and sound effects in the vein of the game and commentary from Griffey.
