= Midnight Club 3: Dub Edition =

2005 racing video game

- Cover art featuring a Cadillac Escalade (left) and a Chrysler 300C (right) with the skyline of downtown Atlanta in the background
- Developer: Rockstar San Diego (Note: Ported to PlayStation Portable by Rockstar Leeds.)
- Publisher: Rockstar Games
- Director: Daren Bader
- Producers: Jay Panek; Glen Hernandez; Eric Smith
- Designers: Jeff Pidasdny; Kris Roberts; Mauro Fiore
- Programmers: Mark Robison; Michael Currington; Tim Laubach
- Artists: Scott Stoabs; David Hong
- Series: Midnight Club
- Platforms: PlayStation 2 Xbox; PlayStation Portable
- Release: PlayStation 2, Xbox: NA: April 12, 2005; PAL: April 15, 2005; PlayStation Portable: NA: June 28, 2005; PAL: September 1, 2005; Remix: NA: March 13, 2006; EU: March 17, 2006
- Genre: Racing
- Modes: Single-player, multiplayer

Midnight Club 3: Dub Edition is a 2005 racing video game developed by Rockstar San Diego and published by Rockstar Games. It is the third installment in the Midnight Club series. Like previous installments in the series, the game is an arcade-style racer and focuses on wild, high-speed racing, rather than realistic physics and driving. The name is derived from a partnership between Rockstar and DUB Magazine, which features heavily in the game in the form of DUB-sponsored races and DUB-customized vehicles as prizes.

Players race through open world recreations of San Diego, Atlanta, and Detroit listening to 98 (124 in the Remix version) licensed music tracks that include hip hop, rock, and other genres. The game features a number of graphical views after the player crashes into certain objects, or travels across particular stretches of road. There is also the ability to customize a player's vehicle. Other than modifying the external looks, the vehicle's performance can also be improved (with the exception of all "A" Class Exotics and Mercedes-AMG cars). Midnight Club 3: Dub Edition is the first game in the series to feature licensed vehicles.

In March 2006, an updated version of the game was released titled Midnight Club 3: Dub Edition Remix; which featured new vehicles, races and music, as well an additional mode called "Tokyo Challenge" which features an altered Tokyo map from Midnight Club II.

== Gameplay ==
Midnight Club 3: Dub Edition is an open world racing video game and the first game in the series to include car modification, both visual and performance. By winning races, the player unlocks new cars and options to customize them with. These options include enhancing the performance, adding vinyls and new paint jobs, and physically modifying the car by changing parts such as wheels, bumpers, spoilers, neon, hoods, and engine components. The cars are divided into four classes: D, C, B and A, depending on their performance.

There are five types of races in the game: Ordered Race, Circuit Race, Unordered Race, Autocross Race, Track and Frenzy. In ordered races the player races through the city on a course marked by yellow-orange flares to reach a finish line. In circuit races the player races along a circuit course through the city for a set number of laps. In unordered races the player is free to go through scattered checkpoints in any order before crossing the finish line. Autocross races take place in a walled-in circuit of the street with no traffic or police, the goal being to finish the circuit faster than a set time. Track events, available in arcade mode, are similar to autocross races, except that the player competes against other races inside the barricaded track, often taking more damage. Frenzy events are also available in Arcade, and are time trial races which have some vehicular combat elements where, for example, the player gets every 15 seconds of a nitrous boost, also the e-brake will not work, and the race only ends when the time is over.

Players can also create their own races in the Race Editor (not available in the PSP version). Players can create either a circuit, ordered or unordered race by placing checkpoints throughout the city, and can change racing conditions such as traffic, weather, and time of day.

=== Vehicles ===
There are seven types of cars: Tuners (Note: Despite not officially being Tuners, the Lotus Elise and all Class B Sport Cars were put into the Tuner Class) Luxury Sedans, SUVs/Trucks, Exotics, Muscle Cars, Sport Bikes, and Choppers. As the game continues, different clubs that drive a specific type of car will invite the player to race with them: American Royalty Car Club (Muscle Cars), Big Playas (SUVs/Trucks), By Invitation Only (Exotics), Chopper of America Bike Club (Choppers), Luxury Rollers (Luxury Cars), Original Riders (Sport Bikes) and Unbeatable Street Racers (Tuners). If the player beats a club in three races they unlock a special ability for that class. Tuners, Sport Bikes, Exotics, the Lexus SC430 and Mercedes Benz SL 500 (R230) (along with its higher-performance AMG variant, the SL 55) get "Zone" (a form of bullet time which allows for more precise handling at high speeds), Trucks/SUVs and Luxury Cars get "Agro" (which allows the vehicle to plow through traffic and other obstacles without taking damage or slowing down), and Muscle Cars and Choppers get "Roar" (the only offensive ability, it launches a sonic wave that blows away any vehicles in its path).

=== Multiplayer ===
The game includes an online mode, where players can race with other players from all around the world. There are also many clubs available to join, but players can also start and manage their own. Most offline modes are available for play online, while in online mode it is possible to chat in-game, including a cruise mode, capture the flag, circuit racing, ordered racing, unordered racing, tag, paint and Autocross. Tracks created via the Race Editor offline can be used Online. On Xbox Live, the game also supports voice chat. Xbox Live was shut down on April 15, 2010. Midnight Club 3: Dub Edition is now supported online with replacement online servers for the Xbox called Insignia.

== Plot ==
=== San Diego ===
The player begins in San Diego by meeting Oscar (David Barrera), the mechanic of Six-One-Nine Customs, a tuning garage in San Diego. Oscar guides the player through the game by providing helpful tips and information about races. The player begins with a choice of six cars: a 1964 Chevrolet Impala, a 1978 Chevrolet Monte Carlo, a 2004 Dodge Neon SRT-4, a 2004 Mitsubishi Eclipse GT-S, a Volkswagen Golf R32 Mk4, or a 2004 Volkswagen Jetta (Midnight Club 3: Dub Edition Remix added the option of a Scion tC). As the player wins races new customization options and cars are unlocked for purchase.

The street racers available to challenge at the beginning of the game are: Vanessa (Mitsubishi Eclipse GT-S), Bishop (Lexus GS430), and Carlos (1978 Chevrolet Monte Carlo). Beating each of these street racers will unlock an invitation to challenge a racing club the rival racer is part of; Vanessa unlocks the Unbeatable Street Racers (Tuners; which rewards the player with a Nissan Skyline GT-R (R34)), Bishop unlocks the Luxury Rollers (Luxury Sedans; which rewards the player with a Mercedes-Benz CL 55 AMG (C215)) and Carlos unlocks the American Royalty Car Club (Muscle Cars; which rewards the player with a Chevrolet Corvette (C3)) Beating two of these street racers will allow the player to challenge Phil for ownership of his Hotmatch Cuevito, and an invitation to challenge the Chopper of America bike club. Once the player defeats Phil, along with winning one of the three initial tournaments, Vanessa will challenge them again, this time, driving an upgraded Mitsubishi Eclipse GT-S.

After defeating all racers (except for one of Bishop or Carlos) and winning one of the tournaments in San Diego, the player is introduced to Vince (Kiff VandenHeuvel), a mechanic from Detroit. Oscar mentions that the player has been building a reputation as a skilled racer, and that there are some big time races in Atlanta that the player may be interested in. He tells the player to go to the shipping company to make the trip.

=== Atlanta ===
The player arrives at a garage in Atlanta called "Apone Team Racing". The owner, Apone (Dexter Tillis), introduces himself, but is distracted by his most prized possession: a 1964 gold painted Chevrolet Impala that he customized and is constantly tinkering with. In Atlanta, the player is challenged by three racers. There is also a tournament going on, for which the prize is a "DUB'd-Out" 2004 Cadillac Escalade EXT. After defeating all racers (except for either Dre and Cheng or Vito and Naomi) in Atlanta, Apone mentions that there are more races going on in Detroit and that he thinks it is a good idea for the player to check it out.

Street racers in Atlanta are: Roy (1969 Dodge Charger R/T, later a 1999 Dodge Charger R/T Concept), Dre (2005 Cadillac Escalade (second generation)), Cheng (Mitsubishi Lancer Evolution VIII), Vito (Ducati Monster S4R), Lamont (Chevrolet Silverado SS; later returns in a Mercedes-Benz CLK GTR Strassenversion during the US Championship) and Naomi (Hotmatch Skully). Defeating Vito unlocks the Original Riders (Sport Bikes), defeating Dre or Lamont unlocks the Big Playas (SUV/Trucks).

=== Detroit ===
The player arrives in Detroit and sees a familiar face, Vince. Remembering him, he welcomes the player to town and his shop. He later points to a Lamborghini Murciélago and says it is the prize to whatever car club turns out the best street racer. A familiar face from Atlanta comes to Detroit, Roy, who is a plot-affected racer but is never seen or mentioned. The player races them a couple of times, as well as the car clubs. Early in the player's Detroit career, a tournament is held and a 1949 Chevrolet Fleetline (as Oscar describes it "Just the car to win in Detroit!") is the prize. Upon defeating Ceasar in his first encounter, the player scores a challenge from the By Invitation Only Exotic Car Club. Defeating them earns the player a special, rare 2004 Chrysler ME Four-Twelve (with "Zone" for Exotics being unlocked after the third race).

Street racers in Detroit are: Roy (returning with a Dodge Viper GTS-R Concept; and eventually with a McLaren F1 LM), Spider (Hotmatch D'Elegance), Leo (1981 Chevrolet Camaro Z28), Ceasar (Mercedes-Benz SLR McLaren, later a Lamborghini Gallardo and eventually a Chrysler ME Four-Twelve), Kioshi (Aprilla RSV 1000 R Mille Factory, later a Kawasaki Ninja ZX-12R), and Angel (Saleen S7; later a Cadillac Cien).

=== U.S. Championship Series ===
After defeating all racers in Detroit, the player races certain drivers twice in a series titled U.S. Championship Series, which takes place in all three cities. and upon defeating them, is crowned the victor of the U.S. Champion Series. Afterwards, the player returns to Vince's and is rewarded the Lamborghini Murciélago from before. Vince says: "It should be driven with respect, and not by some San Diego swinger who thinks he's hot stuff or something".

After completing the rest of the Career Mode, including the Club Races and Tournaments, the player is awarded the Cadillac Sixteen.

== Development ==
According to the developer Rockstar San Diego, the three cities present in the initial 2005 release of the game were chosen due to their significance to the game's automotive and racing themes. Atlanta was chosen for its pioneering of automobile customization, Detroit due to its status as the birthplace of the U.S. automobile industry, and San Diego for its influence on the development of the import tuner scene and wider street racing culture. Furthermore, San Diego is the hometown of Rockstar San Diego, formerly known as Angel Studios prior to acquisition.

Rockstar Games also developed a Remix version of the game, which was released in March 2006.

== Midnight Club 3: Dub Edition Remix ==
Midnight Club 3: Dub Edition Remix is a revised edition of Midnight Club 3: Dub Edition. It is available as a Greatest Hits release on PlayStation 2 and a Platinum Hits release on Xbox (the remix edition of the game is not available for the PlayStation Portable). The game was released on March 13, 2006, or exactly eleven months after the original version's release. It was released on December 19, 2012, on PlayStation Network for the PS3, but was removed after a passing of time due to licensing issues.

The game features all of the cities, vehicles, music, and other features from Midnight Club 3: Dub Edition. This version of the game also allows the player to import the original game data stored on their memory card hard drive to Midnight Club 3: Dub Edition Remix to make up for lost progress, thus saving the player from starting all over again.

The following features were added in Remix:

- 24 new vehicles (including some from brands not in the original version, such as GMC, Infiniti, Pagani, and Scion).
- Tokyo, as a returning city, which is a slightly updated version of the Tokyo city from Midnight Club II. It serves as optional career mode, Tokyo Challenge.
- 25 new licensed songs.
- Additional races and battle maps.
- Recolored Menu UI, being recolored from a mostly blue/gold UI to a red/black/silver colored user interface.

=== Tokyo Challenge ===
In Dub Edition Remix, The Tokyo Challenge is available immediately, but must be entered from the menu. Cars unlocked in the regular career may be used in Tokyo and vice versa.

The mechanic introduced in Tokyo is Tomoya (James Yaegashi), owner of the Speedway garage. In cutscenes, Tomoya is often belittling his mechanic, Toshi, as he works on an Infiniti G35. Tomoya serves as the player's guide through events in Tokyo and will voice most tutorials not yet unlocked in the regular career.

Tournaments appear on the map in Tokyo after winning a certain number individual races. Tokyo features a Club Tournament for each vehicle type, each with a reward car. These include the Gemballa F355, Chevrolet Cobalt SS, Hotmatch Chingon, Cadillac Coupe de Ville, Infiniti G35, Hummer H3T, and Ducati Paul Smart 1000. Unique to Tokyo are Class Tournament cups limited to vehicles within a certain vehicle class (D, C, B, and A). Reward vehicles include the 2005 Dodge Magnum R/T DUB Edition, Nissan Sport Concept, 2006 Dodge Charger SRT-8 DUB Edition, and Pagani Zonda.

The award for winning all Tokyo tournaments is the Tokyo Police version of the Nissan Skyline GT-R (R34), which the player receives after a cutscene in which Tomoya fires Toshi. The Tokyo Challenge cannot be totally completed without making progress in the regular campaign.

== Soundtrack ==
The following music can be found in Midnight Club 3: Dub Edition and the Remix soundtrack is also included. Musical artists found in the game include numerous Army of the Pharaohs members, The Game, Paul Wall, T.I., 50 Cent, Big Tymers, Mannie Fresh, Fabolous, Bump J, Calyx, Deep Blue, Ash, Aztec Mystic, Jimmy Eat World, Kasabian, Marilyn Manson, The Explosion, Nine Inch Nails, Sean Paul, Pitbull, Lil Wayne, and other artists. The soundtrack consisted of 99 tracks. The Remix's soundtrack consisted of 25 extra tracks; 124 tracks altogether. A large number of Detroit techno artists are also featured on the soundtrack, reflecting the game's setting.

== Reception ==
Reception

Aggregate score
Aggregator	Score		
Aggregator	PS2	PSP	Xbox
Metacritic	84/100	74/100	84/100

Review scores
Publication	Score		
Publication	PS2	PSP	Xbox
Edge	6/10	N/A	6/10
Electronic Gaming Monthly	8.67/10	7.67/10	8.67/10
Eurogamer	N/A	5/10	7/10
Game Informer	9.5/10	8/10	9.5/10
GamePro	N/A	N/A	4/5
GameRevolution	B+	C	B+
GameSpot	8.3/10	7.3/10	8.3/10
GameSpy	4.5/5	3.5/5	4.5/5
GameTrailers	9.1/10	7.3/10	9.1/10
GameZone	9.3/10	8/10	9.4/10
IGN	9.2/10	7.1/10	9.2/10
Official U.S. PlayStation Magazine	4/5	4/5	N/A
Official Xbox Magazine (US)	N/A	N/A	9/10
Detroit Free Press	N/A	2/4	3/4
The Sydney Morning Herald	4/5	N/A	N/A

The PlayStation 2 and Xbox versions of Midnight Club 3: Dub Edition received "favorable" reviews, while the PSP version received "average" reviews, according to the review aggregation website Metacritic.

The game has sold at least 1.1 million copies worldwide on the PS2 version, and 3.64 million copies worldwide on the PSP version. The PlayStation Portable release received a "Platinum" sales award from the Entertainment and Leisure Software Publishers Association (ELSPA), indicating sales of at least 300,000 copies in the United Kingdom.

=== Remix ===
Reception

Aggregate score
Aggregator	Score	
Aggregator	PS2	Xbox
Metacritic	85/100	87/100

Review scores
Publication	Score	
Publication	PS2	Xbox
1Up.com	A	A
Eurogamer	7/10	N/A
Game Informer	9.5/10	9.5/10
GameSpot	8.2/10	8.2/10
GameSpy	4.5/5	4.5/5
GameZone	N/A	8.6/10
IGN	8.8/10	8.8/10
Official Xbox Magazine (US)	N/A	8.5/10
PlayStation: The Official Magazine	9.5/10	N/A
VideoGamer.com	8/10	8/10

The Dub Edition Remix received "favorable" reviews, more so than the original, according to Metacritic.
