= Ken Griffey Jr.'s Winning Run =

1996 video game

- Developer: Rare
- Publisher: Nintendo
- Designer: Oliver Davies
- Programmer: Oliver Norton
- Composer: Eveline Fischer
- Platform: Super Nintendo Entertainment System
- Release: NA: June 10, 1996
- Genre: Sports (baseball)
- Modes: Single-player, multiplayer

Ken Griffey Jr.'s Winning Run is a 1996 baseball video game developed by Rare and published by Nintendo for the Super Nintendo Entertainment System. It is named after the baseball player Ken Griffey Jr. It is the follow-up to Nintendo's previous Ken Griffey Jr. Presents Major League Baseball. Two years later, Nintendo released another game featuring Griffey, Major League Baseball Featuring Ken Griffey Jr., for the Nintendo 64.

The game's title is derived from the final play of the 1995 American League Division Series featuring the Seattle Mariners and New York Yankees. On a play that is sometimes credited with "saving baseball in Seattle", Griffey scored the game's winning run all the way from first base, on a close play in the bottom of the 11th inning.

Due to the lack of a Major League Baseball Players' Association license, Griffey is the only player in the game to use his actual name.

== Gameplay ==
Gameplay screenshot.

The game features the 28 MLB teams in existence at the time, though playing through a full 162 game season unlocks the option to play against the two 1998 expansion teams, the Tampa Bay Devil Rays and the Arizona Diamondbacks (who were founded in 1995 but didn't begin play until 1998). The game includes a franchise mode, MLB Challenge mode, exhibition (single-game) play, and All-Star Game mode, which includes a home run derby mode. Unlike its predecessor, most of the stadiums in the game are generic and the Houston Astros play on natural grass at the Astrodome. From the batter's box most of the other stadiums look authentic but once the ball goes towards the warning track, the outfield walls on either side have a big wall and left center/centerfield/right center have a small outfield wall. At Wrigley Field the ivy is visible from the batters box, but once the ball goes towards the outfield wall there is no signature green ivy.

This was one of the first video games to have alternate uniforms for a sports game. The computer randomly selects either the standard home and away, or a "colored" alternate. In some cases the home team will be in their gray uniform while the away team will be in an alternate or standard home white.

== Promotional Items ==
Promotional items for the video game included a keychain of a miniature baseball and a wooden bat with the game's title imprinted on one side and Super Nintendo on the other.

== Reception ==
Reception

Review scores
Publication	Score
AllGame	4/5
EP Daily	9/10
Game Informer	8.5/10
Game Players	81%
Next Generation	4/5
Official Nintendo Magazine	92/100
Digital Press	7/10
Entertainment Weekly	C−
VideoGame Advisor	A
VideoGames	7/10

Ken Griffey Jr.'s Winning Run received generally favorable reviews from critics. Electronic Gaming Monthly's two sports reviewers said the game had improved graphics and player animations compared to Ken Griffey Jr. Presents Major League Baseball. Nintendo Power highlighted the game's impressive graphics, CD-quality sound, and realistic play controls, but considered the lack of the MLBPA license to be a drawback. GamePro's Air Hendrix felt the game retained its authenticity despite having Ken Griffey Jr. as the only actual player. He also praised the tight controls, exceptional graphics, and soundscapes. Next Generation lauded the game's rich color, fluid animation, immersive sound, and retention of the arcade style gameplay from the original Ken Griffey Jr. title.

In 2011, IGN placed Ken Griffey Jr.'s Winning Run on their "Top 100 SNES Games" list at #52. In 2023, Comic Book Resources listed it as one of the ten best SNES games released during its late years.
