= Midnight Club =

Video game series

- Most recent version of the series logo, as seen in Midnight Club: Los Angeles
- Genre: Racing
- Developers: Rockstar San Diego; Rebellion Developments; Rockstar Leeds; Rockstar London
- Publishers: Rockstar Games; Destination Software
- Platforms: PlayStation 2 Game Boy Advance; Xbox; Microsoft Windows; PlayStation Portable; PlayStation 3 Xbox 360
- First release: Midnight Club: Street Racing; October 26, 2000
- Latest release: Midnight Club: Los Angeles Complete Edition; October 12, 2009

Midnight Club is a series of arcade-style racing video games developed by Rockstar San Diego (formerly Angel Studios) and published by Rockstar Games. Midnight Club is similar to the Midtown Madness series previously developed by Angel Studios, with a focus on competitive street racing in open world urban environments. Throughout the series, players race through condensed depictions of New York City, London, Los Angeles, Paris, Tokyo, San Diego, Atlanta, and Detroit.

== Premise ==
The Midnight Club series was inspired by the real life Japanese racing group (hashiriya), known as the Mid Night Racing Team, that hosted illegal street runs on the Bayshore Route (known natively as the Wangan) of the Shuto Expressway in the Greater Tokyo Area. Two kanji characters (湾岸, or "wangan") appear in each of the series' logos; the Japanese manga series Wangan Midnight – also inspired by the club – includes the same two characters in its logos. The kanji is removed from the titles in the Japanese versions of Midnight Club: Street Racing and Midnight Club: Los Angeles to avoid legal conflict with Wangan Midnight rights owners Kodansha.

In each game, the player begins with a relatively unmodified and slow vehicle. Higher-performance vehicles can be won or purchased by the player after competing in races against other club members. The goal is to defeat each of the other opponents (which include "city champion" and "world champion" racers) en route to becoming the new champion of the Midnight Club. Later installments of the series include real vehicle brands with sophisticated customization options for each, and "club" races, which consist of racers using vehicles of the same class.

== Games ==
Year	Title	Developer	Platform(s)		
Year	Title	Developer	Home console	Computer	Handheld
2000	Midnight Club: Street Racing	Angel Studios (Note: GBA version of Midnight Club developed by Rebellion Developments)	PS2; PS3 (Note: Released on PS3 via the PlayStation Store as part of the PS2 Classics line)		GBA
2003	Midnight Club II	Rockstar San Diego (Note: PSP version of Midnight Club 3 developed by Rockstar Leeds)	PS2; Xbox; PS3	Windows	
2005	Midnight Club 3: Dub Edition	Rockstar San Diego	PS2; Xbox		PSP
2006	Midnight Club 3: Dub Edition Remix	Rockstar San Diego	PS2; Xbox; PS3		
2008	Midnight Club: Los Angeles	Rockstar San Diego	PS3; X360		
2008	Midnight Club: L.A. Remix	Rockstar London			PSP
2009	Midnight Club: Los Angeles Complete Edition	Rockstar San Diego	PS3; X360		

=== Midnight Club 3: Dub Edition ===
Midnight Club 3: Dub Edition, developed by Rockstar San Diego and published by Rockstar Games, is the third game in the Midnight Club series. It is also the first game in the series to feature licensed vehicles and allow players to customize their cars and bikes with performance and visual upgrades. It was released for the PlayStation 2 and Xbox on April 11, 2005, and later ported to the PlayStation Portable in June of that same year. The three cities featured are San Diego, Atlanta, and Detroit. The name is derived from a partnership between Rockstar and Dub Magazine, which features heavily in the game in the form of DUB-sponsored races and DUB-customized vehicles. The PlayStation Portable port was developed by Rockstar Leeds.

==== Dub Edition Remix ====
Midnight Club 3: Dub Edition Remix is an updated version of Midnight Club 3. This edition has an extra map of Tokyo updated from Midnight Club II, which adds new missions to the game. Along with that come several new cars, new races, new battle maps, rims, vinyls, hydraulics, body kits, and music.

=== Midnight Club: Los Angeles ===
Midnight Club: Los Angeles is the fourth addition to the Midnight Club lineup. It was released for PlayStation 3 and Xbox 360 on October 20, 2008, in North America and on October 24 in Europe. As the name suggests, the game is based in Los Angeles, featuring Santa Monica, Beverly Hills, Hollywood, Hollywood Hills, San Fernando Valley, Downtown L.A., and most recently South Central. The designers used real street maps in developing the game. The game features online play and downloadable content. Licensed cars and bikes return, including new models and brands such as Ford and Mazda, which were not seen in Midnight Club 3: Dub Edition.

==== L.A. Remix ====
Midnight Club: L.A. Remix is the portable adaption of Midnight Club: Los Angeles for the PlayStation Portable. The port is developed by Rockstar London with Rockstar San Diego. The game features the map of Los Angeles used in Midnight Club II rather than the map used in the console versions of Los Angeles. The game also features the city of Tokyo, using the map from Midnight Club 3: Dub Edition Remix.

== Reception ==
Aggregate review scores As of 9 December 2019.
Game	GameRankings	Metacritic
Midnight Club: Street Racing	(PS2) 77% (GBA) 48%	(PS2) 78% (GBA) 50%
Midnight Club II	(Xbox) 87% (PS2) 86% (PC) 85%	(Xbox) 86% (PS2) 85% (PC) 81%
Midnight Club 3: Dub Edition	(PS2) 86% (Xbox) 86% (PSP) 75%	(PS2) 84% (Xbox) 84% (PSP) 74%
Midnight Club 3: Dub Edition Remix	(Xbox) 87% (PS2) 86%	(Xbox) 87% (PS2) 85%
Midnight Club: Los Angeles	(PS3) 82% (X360) 81%	(PS3) 82% (X360) 81%
Midnight Club: L.A. Remix	(PSP) 79%	(PSP) 79%

The series has received generally positive reviews from critics.

== Future ==
In January 2010, Rockstar had stalled plans for a future Midnight Club installment, and the development team was slowly dismantled. Take-Two Interactive re-registered the Midnight Club trademark in 2012 and acknowledged the series in a January 2022 conference call.
