= Smuggler's Run =

2000 video game

- Developers: Angel Studios (PS2); Rebellion (GBA)
- Publishers: Rockstar Games (PS2); Destination Software (GBA)
- Designer: Wing S. Cho (PS2)
- Platforms: PlayStation 2; Game Boy Advance
- Release: PlayStation 2; NA: October 26, 2000; EU: November 24, 2000; AU: November 30, 2000; Game Boy Advance; NA: September 11, 2002; EU: October 8, 2002
- Genre: Racing
- Modes: Single-player, multiplayer

Smuggler's Run is a racing video game developed by Angel Studios and published by Rockstar Games as a launch title for the PlayStation 2 on October 26, 2000. In the game, the player plays as a smuggler who has a number of different vehicles at his disposal including dune buggies, rally cars, and military vehicles. The vehicles are used to smuggle assorted cargo through three different large, open levels. The game, which was an early release for the Sony PlayStation 2, features career and 1- to 2-player arcade modes.

Smuggler's Run became a part of the Sony Greatest Hits series of games that reached a particular sales milestone for the PlayStation 2.

== Gameplay ==
Smuggler's Mission: New to a local smuggling gang, the player's job is to smuggle cargo through three consecutive levels (forest, desert, and snow) with about ten missions per level. In nearly all missions they must evade the U.S. border patrol, the CIA, or rival smuggling gangs. This is essentially the career mode of the game. There are a total of 34 missions to complete here.

Turf War: In this mode, players can play three different mini-games - two of which involve smuggling cargo while fighting against a rival gang. The final mini-game is a race through a popular spot through the level of their choice.

Joyriding: This is a free roam mode where the player can explore the level of their choice without having to evade the border patrol. This is a good way to become familiar with the levels and find optimal routes through the level during Smuggler's Mission.

== Reception ==
Reception

Aggregate score
| Aggregator | Score | |
| Aggregator | GBA | PS2 |
|---|---|---|
| Metacritic | 41/100 | 79/100 |

Review scores
| Publication | Score | |
| Publication | GBA | PS2 |
|---|---|---|
| AllGame | 1.5/5 | 3.5/5 |
| CNET Gamecenter | N/A | 7/10 |
| Electronic Gaming Monthly | N/A | 7.67/10 (Note: Three critics of Electronic Gaming Monthly gave the PlayStation 2 version each a score of 8/10, 8.5/10 and 6.5/10.) |
| Eurogamer | N/A | 8/10 |
| Famitsu | N/A | 28/40 |
| Game Informer | N/A | 8.5/10 |
| GameFan | N/A | 82% (Note: Three critics of GameFan gave the PlayStation 2 version each a score of 89, 82, and 74.) |
| GameRevolution | N/A | B− |
| GameSpot | 3.1/10 | 8/10 |
| GameSpy | N/A | 75% |
| IGN | N/A | 7.9/10 |
| Next Generation | N/A | 4/5 |
| Nintendo Power | 2.7/5 | N/A |
| Official U.S. PlayStation Magazine | N/A | 4.5/5 |
| Maxim | N/A | 8/10 |

The PlayStation 2 version received "generally favorable reviews", while the Game Boy Advance version received "generally unfavorable reviews", according to the review aggregation website Metacritic. David Chen of NextGen said of the former console version, "A truly next-generation launch title, it's fast, fun, and free of constraints – just the way we like our cross-country crime sprees." In Japan, where the same console version was ported for release under the name Crazy Bump's: Kattobi Car Battle! (CRAZY BUMP'S(クレイジーバンプ) 〜かっとびカーバトル！〜, Kureijī Banpu 〜Kattobi Kā Batoru!〜) and published by Syscom on December 28, 2000, Famitsu gave it a score of 28 out of 40.

Jake The Snake of GamePro said in one review that the PlayStation 2 version "has so many variables that no two runs are alike, and you'll enjoy replaying missions over and over. If you're in the market for some highly addictive, heart-pounding action, score a copy of Smuggler's Run." (Note: GamePro gave the PlayStation 2 version 4.5/5 for graphics, 4/5 for sound, and two 5/5 scores for control and fun factor in one review.) In another GamePro review, Human Tornado said of the same console version, "Smuggler's Run's go-anywhere experience frees you up to get a bit creative with your driving, and the high speeds combined with rugged off-road courses make for a wild ride." (Note: GamePro gave the PlayStation 2 version two 4.5/5 scores for graphics and fun factor, 3.5/5 for sound, and 5/5 for control in another review.) Edge gave the same console version a score of six out of ten, saying that it "smacks of a game which has had a great deal of effort expended on its physics engine and raw playability, but very little on drawing up an overarching design."

According to PC Data, Smuggler's Run sold 120,000 units in 2000 for the PlayStation 2.

== Sequel ==
A sequel to the game was produced: Smuggler's Run 2, which was released for the Sony PlayStation 2 on October 30, 2001. The sequel was later ported to the GameCube on August 7, 2002, and renamed Smuggler's Run: Warzones.
