= Midtown Madness =

1999 racing game

- Box art depicting a yellow Volkswagen New Beetle in a police chase
- Developer: Angel Studios
- Publisher: Microsoft
- Director: Clinton Keith
- Producer: Jay Panek
- Designer: Frédéric Markus
- Programmer: David Etherton
- Artists: Kate Bigel; Michael Limber
- Composer: Paul Lackey
- Platform: Microsoft Windows
- Release: NA: May 18, 1999; EU: June 4, 1999
- Genre: Racing
- Modes: Single-player, multiplayer

Midtown Madness (also known as Midtown Madness: Chicago Edition) is a 1999 racing game developed by Angel Studios and published by Microsoft for Microsoft Windows. The demo version was released in August 1999. Two sequels followed, with Midtown Madness 2 released in September 2000 and Midtown Madness 3 released in June 2003 for the Xbox. The game is set in Chicago; the object is for the player to win street races and obtain new cars.

Unlike racing games that restrict the player to a race track, Midtown Madness offers an open world recreation of Chicago. This setting was said to provide "an unprecedented degree of freedom to drive around in a virtual city". Players can explore the city using one of several modes and can determine the weather and traffic conditions for each race. The game supports multiplayer races over a local area network or the Internet. The game received generally positive reviews from gaming websites. Angel Studios developed another video game featuring open-world recreations of cities, Midnight Club: Street Racing.

== Gameplay ==
Midtown Madness features four single-player modes: Blitz, Circuit, Checkpoint, and Cruise. In Blitz mode, the player must swing through three checkpoints and drive to the finish line within a time limit. Circuit mode curtains off most of the city to resemble race tracks and pits the player against other cars. Checkpoint mode combines the features of Blitz and Circuit modes and has the player race against other cars to a destination—but also adds the complication of other traffic, such as police cars and pedestrians. In Cruise mode, the player can simply explore the city at their own pace. Each mode except Cruise is divided into missions—completing one unlocks the next. Environmental conditions found in each mode include: weather (sunny, rainy, cloudy, and snowy), time of day (sunrise, afternoon, sunset, and night-time), and the density of pedestrians, traffic, and police vehicles. The heads-up display includes information about the race and a detailed map, but this display can be turned off.

Players start off with five vehicles; five more are unlockable. The available vehicles range from a Volkswagen New Beetle and a Ford F-350 to a city bus and a Freightliner Century truck. Unlocking vehicles requires completing goals such as placing within the top three in any two races. If the player has previously won a race mission, they can change the race's duration and the weather when replaying it. The Checkpoint mode allows players to set the frequency of traffic, police cars, and pedestrians. Vehicles can accrue damage from collisions, and can be disabled if excessive damage is accrued, resulting in premature failure of Blitz or Checkpoint races, or several seconds of time lost before the vehicle is immediately restored in Circuit races and Cruise.

The game's city environment is modeled after Chicago, including many of its landmarks, such as the 'L', the Willis Tower (then known as the Sears Tower), Wrigley Field, and Soldier Field. The streets feature a number of objects the player can crash into including trash bins, parking meters, mailboxes and traffic lights. In Checkpoint mode other vehicles move in accordance with traffic lights, but the player is under no obligation to obey them.

Midtown Madness supports multiplayer games on a local area network, the Internet, or by serial cable connection. The Multiplayer mode was originally supported by Microsoft's MSN Gaming Zone, but this service was retired on June 19, 2006. It is now supported by similar services such as GameSpy Arcade and XFire, via DirectPlay. The Multiplayer mode includes a Cops and Robbers mode, a capture the flag-style game in which players form two teams and each team tries to steal the opposing team's cache of gold and return it to their own hideout.

== Development ==
Midtown Madness was one of the first games that Angel Studios developed for the PC, using the ARTS (Angel Real Time Simulation) development technology. Microsoft planned to publish sequels to racing computer games with the word Madness in the title, including Motocross Madness and Monster Truck Madness. According to project director Clinton Keith, the concept behind the game came to two Microsoft employees during an attempt to cross a crowded Paris street. They proposed their idea to Angel Studios, which had tried to sell Microsoft a 3D vehicle simulator. Initially, Angel Studios was hesitant to accept Microsoft's offer given the magnitude of the proposed undertaking. They ultimately agreed, and on July 3, 1997, Angel Studios signed a contract with Microsoft to develop a prototype of Midtown Madness. Development of the prototype started in September 1997 and completed in January 1998. A preliminary game design document was then created on February 6, 1998, with the final version being completed on March 2, 1998. The city of Chicago was chosen due to it featuring in several famous car chases in films, including The Blues Brothers. The development team asked Chicago residents to playtest the game to ensure that the city was recreated faithfully. PC Gamer reported that the re-creation was mostly accurate, although certain landmarks were moved to enhance gameplay. 8 to 15 people were working on the game at any one time.

Angel Studios and Microsoft included regular cars in addition to the "overpowered Italian sports cars" often seen in racing games. The developers obtained permission from manufacturers to use the likenesses of selected vehicles. Microsoft received authorization from Volkswagen for the New Beetle, and Ford, for the Mustang and the F-350 Super Duty. The decision to make only half the cars available at the outset was intended to promote a sense of competition. The audio team affixed microphones to cars and had Kiki Wolfkill, one of the few developers with track racing experience, drive around the track while they recorded.

Microsoft staff asked Angel Studios employees to prevent players from hitting pedestrians. Angel Studios (after deciding against rendering pedestrians in two dimensions) developed 3D pedestrian models that could run and jump out of the way. Midtown Madness included an option to remove pedestrians, as they do not alter gameplay but may affect system performance when in a group; consequently, the game does not require a 3D graphics card.

Microsoft's marketing team expressed interest in including Taco Bell restaurants in the game to run promotions that would involve giving away free burritos, according to project director Clinton Keith, but the feature was requested too late in development for Angel Studios to make the change.

The finished game was released to retailers on May 18, 1999, with full distribution completed by May 27, 1999. A demo version was released for download on August 5, 1999. It featured three vehicles (a Mustang, a Panoz Roadster, and a bus), and all driving modes except Circuit. The demo also included features that were scrapped in the full version, such as the ability to send billboards flying. A second demo was also released around the same time by Volkswagen, featuring the Volkswagen New Beetle. In November 1999, a patch was released to improve the multiplayer experience. The same patch was released again in May 2000 without SafeDisc protection, and again in January 2002 with a small change to fix Windows XP support. In December 1999, Angel Studios reported that they were considering a race designer for players, but ultimately this feature was not added. However, in March 2000, a vehicle creation kit was released to allow the creation of custom vehicles.

Midtown Madness is distinct from other racing games of its time, especially those influenced by the Need for Speed series, in providing an open environment rather than a closed circuit. Project director Clinton Keith said that an open world makes the gameplay more diverse and adds "element[s] of discovery" such as finding shortcuts. Gary Whitta described the game as open world racing: "[Y]ou still have checkpoints to hit, [but] you don't have to follow the A-B-C-D standard to do it".

== Reception ==
Reception

Aggregate score
Aggregator	Score
GameRankings	81%

Review scores
Publication	Score
AllGame	4.5/5
CNET Gamecenter	7/10
Computer Games Strategy Plus	3.5/5
Computer Gaming World	4/5
Edge	8/10
GameFan	4/5
GamePro	4.5/5
GameSpot	7.7/10
IGN	8.4/10
Next Generation	4/5
PC Accelerator	7/10
PC Gamer (US)	90%
The Cincinnati Enquirer	4/4

The game received favorable reviews according to the review aggregation website GameRankings. The IGN review noted that the game "doesn't rely heavily on driving authenticity; this game's all about fun." The review also praised the simplicity whereby players can "pick a real-world car and go." GameSpot's reviewer wrote that "it's fun to be able to drive like a maniac [...] because you know you can't in real life." Computer and Video Games' review remarked on the game's humor, provided by other drivers, police, and competitors (described as maniacs), praising the "carnage that unfolds before your windscreen." PC Zone's Steve Hill recommended the game, calling it highly refreshing; Total Video Games reviewer said the game seemed a good choice, but suggested that it would be outdone by GT Interactive's Driver, released soon after. The AllGame reviewer called it a "must-buy for the driving game enthusiast" and said that it would also appeal to players who are not necessarily fans of the racing car genre. Next Generation Magazine concluded its review by stating that Midtown Madness was not innovative, but that "it'll stay on your hard drive for a while and keep you playing."

IGN's Tal Blevins gave high marks to the game's graphics, saying that "the downtown portion of Chicago is portrayed very accurately" even though other parts of the city looked more generic. Next Generation Magazine's reviewer said the graphics were impressive and praised the "thoroughly detailed" random occurrences of "cars hurtling in front of you" and "cringing pedestrians when you lurch onto the sidewalks". GameSpot's reviewer approved of the variety in third-person, the first-person dashboard, and the widescreen driving views. However, they complained of the game suffering from "choppy frame rates" and unconvincing visual effects.

A heavily damaged Cadillac Eldorado hitting oncoming traffic while being pursued by a police car. Moments like this earned the game praise for making it "fun to be able to drive like a maniac [...] because you know you can't in real life".

PC Zone''s Hill praised Angel Studios for avoiding gimmicks, instead presenting "accurately modeled cars and a meticulously recreated city" to the player. AllGame's review said Midtown Madness "possesses superb, immersive graphics", using the different times of day and weather as an example. Conversely, it complained that cars not controlled by the player were lacking in detail. Randell said that as well as being "structurally and visually consistent", the Chicago setting in Midtown Madness was "brought to life"—for instance, a "city bus legitimately pulling out at a four-way junction" can end the race for a player by destroying their car. Total Video Games' review called the game's presentation "far from optimal" even with the recommended system requirements. Reviewer Noel Brady pointed out "a serious lack of detail" and called the screen "blocky", especially without a graphics card. He was critical of the AI, declaring that cars often drive "without noticing [the player] at all". In his book AI Game Engine Programming, Brian Schwab described Midtown Madness' gameplay as "arcade style" and "fast and loose", and said the in-game traffic was satisfactory.

IGN's review described the in-game narration as "a nice touch", but noted some glitches among the otherwise "distinctive engine and horn sounds". Calling the game's sounds exceptional, GameSpot's review praised the variety of car noises such as the back-up beeper for the bus. PC Zone's Hill praised the in-game radio system and the support for external media players. AllGame's review said players "get a dose of reality" with other drivers and pedestrians "hurling insults and exclamations your way".

The game sold 100,805 copies in the U.S. by April 2000.

The staff of PC Gamer US nominated the game for their 1999 Best Racing Game award, which ultimately went to Re-Volt. They wrote that the game "lays down a racing milestone by creating a living, breathing 3D city — and then letting you trash it". It was also a nominee for Computer Gaming World's Racing Game of the Year award, and for CNET Gamecenter's "Best Racing Game" award, but lost both of them to Need for Speed: High Stakes.

== Legacy ==
Midtown Madness spawned a three-title series of the same name, the second entry of which, Midtown Madness 2, was developed by Angel Studios and released in September 2000. Another sequel, Midtown Madness 3, was developed by Digital Illusions CE for the Xbox and published in June 2003. The games' most-acclaimed elements were the detailed open-world environment, distinct visual presentation and sophisticated artificial intelligence.

In 2000, Angel Studios and Rockstar Games created Midnight Club: Street Racing, a PlayStation 2 video game also featuring open world recreations of urban cities. Its critical and commercial success spawned the Midnight Club series of street racing-themed games.
