= Midnight Club II =

2003 video game

- Cover art featuring Maria, Dice, and Moses with Saikou XS and Monsoni
- Developer: Rockstar San Diego
- Publisher: Rockstar Games
- Director: Steven Olds
- Producer: Jay Panek
- Designer: Mauro Fiore
- Programmers: Ted Carson; Mark Rotenberg
- Artists: Scott Stoabs; David Hong
- Writers: Gillian Telling; Marc Fernandez
- Series: Midnight Club
- Platforms: PlayStation 2 Xbox; Windows
- Release: PlayStation 2: NA: April 8, 2003; EU: May 2, 2003; Xbox: NA: June 4, 2003; EU: June 20, 2003; Microsoft Windows: NA: July 1, 2003; EU: July 11, 2003
- Genre: Racing
- Modes: Single-player, multiplayer

Midnight Club II is a 2003 racing video game developed by Rockstar San Diego and published by Rockstar Games for PlayStation 2, Xbox and Microsoft Windows. It is the sequel to Midnight Club: Street Racing and the first in the series to feature motorcycles. Players can race through the cities of Los Angeles, Paris, and Tokyo. The game received positive reviews.

== Gameplay ==
In-game screenshot of Midnight Club II in Paris

Races (Career and Arcade) consist of a series of checkpoints, represented by columns of light. In most races, the order in which the checkpoints must be cleared is prescribed. In this case, a transparent, glowing arrow points to the next checkpoint. In a few other races, the checkpoints may be cleared in any order. In that case, the arrow spins randomly without pointing in any particular direction. It is up to the player which route to take from one checkpoint to the next. There are no artificial barriers in the game's open world environment that force the player to stay on a specific course. Any area that is drivable or jumpable in the free-roaming cruise mode between races may be used to get to the next checkpoint.

Some areas can be driven upon that are not intended for such use outside of a computer game. Examples are escalators, roofs, railways and riverbeds and many ramps. However, many areas that would be drivable in reality, for example entrances and some stairs, are fenced off with invisible barriers. In some areas, the player can jump or drop down. Using this to the player's advantage can be necessary in order to win a race. If the car falls into deep water, the damage meter goes to its maximum stage and the car is instantly totaled, the race being immediately lost.

Various details have been improved compared to its predecessor Midnight Club: Street Racing. Vehicles and cities have been developed from scratch, but many new features were added as well. 2-Wheel drive, Burnout, Weight Balance (for motorbikes) were all unique to the game. The game also features damage models. The amount of damage inflicted upon a car is indicated by both an HUD indicator and visual damage to the car. The performance of a car does not degrade with damage like some other racing games. When the damage limit of a car is exceeded, the car explodes or stalls. After a delay of a few seconds, the player can continue with an undamaged version of the same car.

Dry, hilly suburbs and congested interstates can be found throughout Los Angeles, and just like its predecessor, the city contains many landmarks, as well as numerous shortcuts and jumps. Paris is home to cobblestone alleyways, monumental roundabouts, and the Paris Catacombs, as well as jumps across the river Seine and into alleyways. Tokyo is a city of neon-glittering avenues and tight alleyways, and contains an equal array of tourist sights and attractions.

The vehicles in Midnight Club II all resemble real-life vehicles but have subtle differences to their counterparts, such as different headlamps or tail lights. Also, most of them have aesthetical modifications commonly found in street racing and import scenes, such as spoilers, hood scoops, and body kits.

In the car selection menu, descriptions and stats of each vehicle can be seen, along with the option to choose among 4 colors. Once a car is viewed, a sound effect unique to that car is played in the background.

Each character will cruise around the city, waiting for a challenge. This excludes Moses, who helps the player begin the Career Mode, as well as the four champions who will seek the player out after all predecessors are beaten. They will talk to the player or "think loudly" during pre-race cut-scenes, during which the player can discover their motives, see the statistics of their vehicle, and learn each character's unique theme song.

Midnight Club II also features an online multiplayer component. The Xbox version was supported through Xbox Live which was shut down on April 15, 2010. The game is now supported online with replacement online servers for the Xbox called Insignia.

== Development ==
The game had a marketing budget of $6.1 million.

== Soundtrack ==
The album was released at E3 in 2003 as a promotional gift. It consists of mainly techno and trance music along with rap music. The soundtrack contains 38 tracks produced by various artists. The tracks "Outrun" and "Extra Dry" were featured in the 2002 film Irreversible and produced by Thomas Bangalter.

== Reception ==
Reception

Aggregate score
Aggregator	Score		
Aggregator	PC	PS2	Xbox
Metacritic	81/100	85/100	86/100

Review scores
Publication	Score		
Publication	PC	PS2	Xbox
AllGame	N/A	3.5/5	3.5/5
Edge	5/10	5/10	5/10
Electronic Gaming Monthly	N/A	8.83/10	8.5/10
Eurogamer	N/A	9/10	8/10
Game Informer	N/A	9/10	9/10
GamePro	N/A	4.5/5	4.5/5
GameRevolution	N/A	B	N/A
GameSpot	7.2/10	7.3/10	7.9/10
GameSpy	4.5/5	4.5/5	4/5
GameZone	8.4/10	9/10	9.2/10
IGN	8.8/10	9.1/10	8.8/10
Official U.S. PlayStation Magazine	N/A	5/5	N/A
Official Xbox Magazine (US)	N/A	N/A	9.3/10
PC Gamer (US)	88%	N/A	N/A
Entertainment Weekly	B+	B+	B+
The Village Voice	N/A	8/10	N/A

The game was met with positive reception. Metacritic gave it a score of 85 out of 100 for the PlayStation 2 version 86 out of 100 for the Xbox version, and 81 out of 100 for the PC version.

Entertainment Weekly gave it an A and stated that "whether racing against the clock or attempting to beat the other drivers in checkpoint contests, memorizing the maps and finding the many shortcuts is crucial". The Village Voice gave the PS2 version a score of eight out of ten and wrote that "the only way [Rockstar] could make [the game] better would be to set it in Boston, where drunks get kicked out of the bars long after the T has shut down, flooding construction-choked highways". Maxim also gave the game a score of eight out of ten and said that "it may not boast garages bloated with the usual name-brand chick magnets you find in other racing games, but the dark racing underbelly of Midnight Club II has every bit as many thrills as the leading grease monkey autopia". Playboy gave it 75% and noted its controls as "touchy" and imprecise.
