= Rockstar San Diego =

American video game developer

Rockstar San Diego, Inc.
- Formerly: Angel Studios, Inc. (1984–2002)
- Type: Subsidiary
- Industry: Video games
- Founded: January 1984; 42 years ago
- Founder: Diego Angel
- Headquarters: Carlsbad, California, US
- Key people: Joshua Bass (co-studio head); Tom Shepherd (co-studio head)
- Products: Midnight Club series (2000–2008); Red Dead series (2004–2018)
- Number of employees: 128 (2011)
- Parent: Rockstar Games (2002–present)
- Divisions: RAGE Technology Group

Rockstar San Diego, Inc. (formerly Angel Studios, Inc.) is an American video game developer and a studio of Rockstar Games based in Carlsbad, California. The studio is best known for developing the Midnight Club and Red Dead series.

The Colombian entrepreneur Diego Angel founded the company as Angel Studios in January 1984 after studying film in Chicago, where he had grown fond of computer animation. The studio began with a focus on animation and visual effects for multimedia productions, such as advertisements, films, and music videos. Notable works include the film The Lawnmower Man and the music video for Peter Gabriel's song "Kiss That Frog". Angel Studios began working in the video game industry during the 1990s, creating cutscenes for Ed Annunziata's Ecco: The Tides of Time (1994) and Mr. Bones (1996). The company fully developed games with Nintendo (Major League Baseball Featuring Ken Griffey Jr. and Ken Griffey Jr.'s Slugfest) and Microsoft (Midtown Madness and Midtown Madness 2), and it produced a port of Capcom's Resident Evil 2 for the Nintendo 64.

Rockstar Games was impressed with the studio's work on Midtown Madness and offered a long-term partnership in 1999, which resulted in the creation of the Midnight Club and Smuggler's Run series. The publisher's parent company, Take-Two Interactive, acquired Angel Studios in November 2002 and integrated it with Rockstar Games as Rockstar San Diego. Angel left the studio in May 2005 and returned to Colombia. Since 2004, Rockstar San Diego has operated an internal game engine team that develops Rockstar Games's proprietary Rockstar Advanced Game Engine, which is used in most of the publisher's titles. The studio led the development of further Midnight Club games, Red Dead Revolver (2004), Red Dead Redemption (2010), and its expansion pack Undead Nightmare. It collaborated with other Rockstar Games studios on Max Payne 3 (2012), Grand Theft Auto V (2013), and Red Dead Redemption 2 (2018).

== History ==
=== Early years in animation (1984–1993) ===
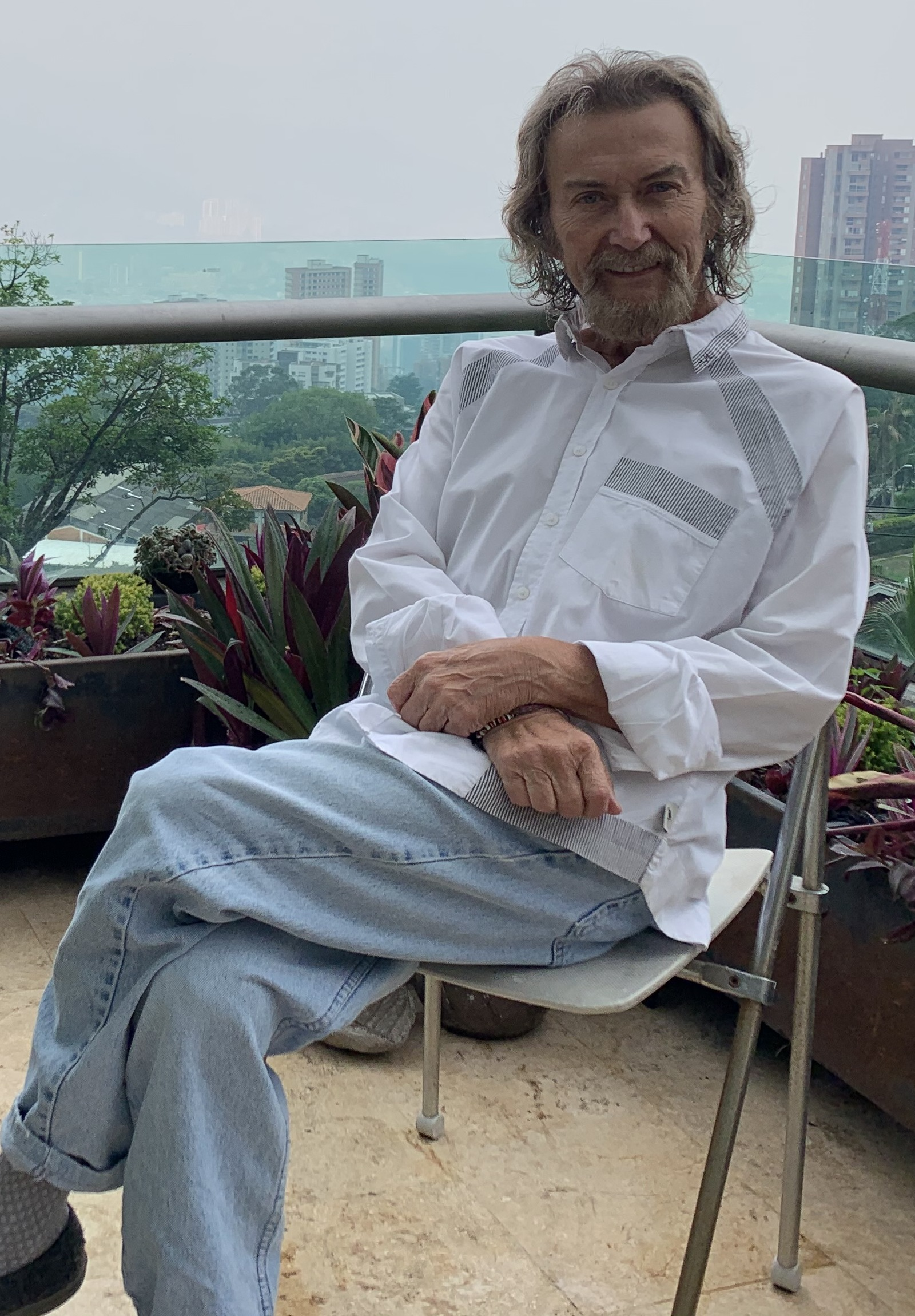
Diego Angel (pictured in 2020) founded Angel Studios in 1984 and served as its president until 2005.

Wanting to become a film director, Diego Angel (Note: Spanish: Diego Ángel) moved from Medellín, Colombia, to Chicago in 1971, when he was in his early 20s. He enrolled at Columbia College Chicago to study film and attended the Art Institute of Chicago. During his studies, Angel grew fond of computer animation, describing computers as "the future of art". In 1984, Angel moved with his wife and two children from Chicago to San Diego because he had friends and relatives there, and because the Spanish-language street names and proximity to Spanish-speaking Mexico made him feel at home. He established Angel Studios as a work-for-hire animation studio in January 1984 in nearby Carlsbad. Angel obtained a computer and an office but, within a few days, realized he could not run a business and be an art director at the same time, while also lacking the knowledge to operate the computers. He consequently hired an art director and a system operator. Angel Studios did not find a paying client for its first six months in operation and garnered only US$5,000 (equivalent to $14,968 in 2025) in revenue in its first year. Angel said he was "suffering" due to a scarcity of work in the company's first two years in business. The company's first project was an educational video for the University of California, San Diego, followed by commercials for Nintendo, Polaroid Corporation, Asiana Airlines, and Cobra Golf, among others. Other early projects were productions for NASA and Rohr Industries, as well as animated logos for Home Box Office and ESPN.

After the first year, the brother-in-law of Angel's wife invested in the company, while Angel secured a bank loan. In the second year, revenues reached $25,000 (equivalent to $73,429 in 2025) and by 1989, Angel Studios had six employees and $500,000 worth of equipment. To ensure key employees would remain with the company, Angel made three of them partners in March 1989. Brad Hunt, Angel Studios's chief technology officer, and Michael Limber, the chief operating officer and later chief creative officer, were among the founding partners. The company grew to twelve employees by February 1993. Angel used a philosophy he called the "three P's" (passion, patience, and perseverance), which meant he would not accept every offer that came his way, choosing instead to only accept projects that showcased his team and its technology. Studio employees said that Angel treated them like family: he paid them well, gave them plenty of vacation time, and occasionally shared a bottle of Patrón-brand tequila on Friday afternoons, an event he called "Sippy Wippy".

Much of the 3D work produced by Angel Studios was for films and music videos. Successes came with the computer-generated imagery and visual effects in the 1992 film The Lawnmower Man and the music video for Peter Gabriel's song "Kiss That Frog". One of the two major scenes the studio produced for The Lawnmower Man is considered the first virtual sex scene. For this project, the company's team consisting of Hunt, Limber, and Jill Knighton Hunt developed Scenix, a software set that provided a "visual programming language". By March 1992, Angel Studios was working on a virtual reality game adaptation of its scenes from the movie. The "Kiss That Frog" music video was part of a simulator ride exhibited in an 18-seat mobile theater, the Mind Blender, which went on tour in 1993. The video received the "Best Special Effects in a Video" award at the 1994 MTV Video Music Awards. For The Enertopia Symphony, a 13-minute short film that was shown at the Electric Energy Pavilion at Expo '93, the studio produced a six-and-a-half-minute stereoscopic animation from live-action 3D photography directed by Peter Anderson. It contracted the agency Spear/Hall & Associates to handle its marketing in August 1993.

=== Entry into video games (1993–2000) ===
During the early 1990s, Angel Studios collaborated on tech demos for Silicon Graphics's high-end computers and received some of these computers in return. One of Silicon Graphics's clients was Genyo Takeda of Nintendo, who was impressed with Angel Studios's work. He met with the company and signed an agreement that made Angel Studios a partner for Nintendo's upcoming Nintendo 64 console. The studio shifted its focus to video game development and Nintendo announced it as one of the studios on its "Dream Team" of external partners for the Nintendo 64 in February 1995. Around this time, Angel consciously steered the studio away from "high-risk, capital-intensive" projects, even if they offered rich potential. Limber cited Angel's business decisions as the biggest factor in the company's survival of the dot-com bubble, which severely impacted the San Diego-area multimedia industry. In retrospect, Angel said he never had a business plan or mission statement and made decisions by gut feeling. Around this time, Angel Studios accepted game designer Ed Annunziata's pitch to create cutscenes for the Sega CD version of Ecco: The Tides of Time. Pleased with the result, Annunziata invited the studio to work on cutscenes for his next game, Mr. Bones for the Sega Saturn. That game was released in 1996 with cutscenes and additional artwork by Angel Studios.

I was the only company in video games, the only [American] studio in those days, that was working and getting along with the Japanese. Americans are kind of closed [off] ... When you're outside the United States, you're open to other cultures than the Americans ... I used to go every month to Japan and just bring six bottles of tequila. They loved it.

— Diego Angel, founder of Angel Studios, 2018

As part of Nintendo's "Dream Team", the company developed two sports games featuring the American baseball player Ken Griffey Jr.—Major League Baseball Featuring Ken Griffey Jr. and Ken Griffey Jr.'s Slugfest—released for the Nintendo 64 in 1998 and 1999, respectively. Although critics praised both games, Angel decided against making further sports titles, declaring that Angel Studios was "not a sports company". The studio continued its work for the Nintendo 64, collaborating with the Nintendo designer Shigeru Miyamoto on a vehicular combat game titled Buggie Boogie. Miyamoto issued three-month contracts to the company, not retaining any documents and returning every three months to check on the game's progress. Angel Studios spent 45 days creating a "design bible" for its first meeting with Miyamoto, who rejected it and asked the studio to "find the fun" over the next three months. The game would have seen vehicles consume each other, absorbing their DNA to obtain their powers. After six to nine months, the title was canceled as Nintendo prioritized a prototype of Diddy Kong Racing. Angel Studios was left with a "well-polished" tech demo it used to pitch its development services to other publishers. Upon Miyamoto's request, the team began working on a fantasy golf game.

In late 1997, Angel Studios was contracted to develop a port of Capcom's PlayStation game Resident Evil 2 for the Nintendo 64. According to Angel, this was the first collaboration between Capcom and a video game company outside Japan. The development had a budget of $1 million and the work was done in two years by nine full-time developers. The port was released in November 1999 and was considered a success: The studio condensed the game's data to less than 10% of its original size, fitting the original version's two compact discs onto a single Nintendo 64 cartridge. In a 2018 retrospective on Resident Evil 2 and its ports, Eurogamer's John Linneman called the conversion "one of the most ambitious console ports of all time". Matt Casamassina of IGN opined the port marked the studio as fit to develop for Nintendo's recently announced Project Dolphin console, which became the GameCube. Angel attributed much of his company's early video game success to his good relationships with Asian publishers.

Another Angel Studios project was Ground Effect, a hovercraft racing game that was due to be published in February 1998 by Inscape before it was acquired by Graphix Zone in February 1997. Angel Studios's film Oceania was exhibited at the Virtual Reality Pavilion of Expo '98. The studio contributed to an adventure ride called Virtual Jungle Cruise, which debuted at the June 1998 opening of the first DisneyQuest interactive theme park in Orlando, Florida. Interactive Light published Angel Studios's beat 'em up-style arcade video game Savage Quest in 1999. Around this time, Angel proposed the development of a racing game despite market saturation. He encouraged his employees to work independently and take ownership over the game's individual parts. This policy was considered a major factor in the game's resulting quality. The game was released as Midtown Madness in May 1999 as part of Microsoft's Madness racing game franchise. Fred Marcus, a designer and programmer on the project, stated the studio's impressive physics demos were key to its publishing contracts. The game was followed by Midtown Madness 2, developed by Angel Studios and released in 2000. The studio continued working with Microsoft on a game involving a virtual girlfriend, planned as an Xbox launch title called XGirl. Sky Pirates VR, a pirate-themed attraction based on Steven Spielberg's "vertical reality" system, was exhibited in GameWorks theme parks. The attraction debuted in Detroit in 2000 and expanded to Schaumburg, Illinois, by December of that year.

=== Rockstar Games deals and acquisition (2000–2003) ===
Angel Studios's logo from 2000 to 2002, designed by Michael Limber

Rockstar Games, an American video game publisher, became interested in working with Angel Studios after the release of Midtown Madness and wanted to use their combined expertise to develop what became the Midnight Club and Smuggler's Run series. As part of their relationship, Angel Studios worked on Oni 2: Death & Taxes, a canceled sequel to the 2001 game Oni, itself owned by Rockstar Games's parent company, Take-Two Interactive. In a November 2000 interview, Rockstar Games's Sam Houser said: "I love Angel Studios ... I am not going to stop working with them." Daily Radar ranked Angel Studios fourth on its 2001 list of the five best developers for Sony platforms, citing the strength of Midnight Club: Street Racing and the first Smuggler's Run game on the PlayStation 2.

Around 2002, Angel discussed selling his company with Microsoft, Activision, and Rockstar Games. He had befriended Sam Houser and his brother Dan, also at Rockstar Games, over a shared love for tequila. The company sought to acquire Angel Studios's Angel Game Engine as a proprietary game engine to replace Criterion Games's RenderWare, which it had used for the Grand Theft Auto series. Rockstar Games initially put forward what Angel considered a low-ball. When he did not respond, the publisher presented an offer Angel said he could not refuse and convinced him that the studio would have the creative freedom he wanted. Take-Two announced it had acquired Angel Studios on November 20, 2002. It paid $28.512 million in cash, 235,679 shares of restricted common stock (valued at $6.557 million), and $5.931 million in prepaid royalties; a total price of $41 million. Angel Studios and its 125 employees were integrated with Rockstar Games as Rockstar San Diego. The headcount increased to 230 by 2003. As part of a cultural shift that some employees felt was abrupt, Rockstar Games scrapped the studio's policy of a week-long recess for all employees after each game's launch.

=== Initial post-acquisition projects (2003–2006) ===
After the acquisition, Rockstar Games executives reviewed the studio's development projects to determine what was worth keeping. Dan Houser noted Red Dead Revolver, which he described as "this cowboy game that looked very good", caught the review team's attention despite being unplayable. The project stemmed from Angel Studios's and Capcom's partnership on the Resident Evil 2 port: Capcom's Yoshiki Okamoto had approached the studio with the idea for an original intellectual property titled S.W.A.T., a third-person shooter involving a seven-piece SWAT team. This later adopted a Western theme at Okamoto's recommendation. Angel Studios began work on the game in 2000 with Capcom's supervision and funding. The development was troubled, partly due to cultural differences between the two companies, and the game remained unplayable. After Okamoto left Capcom, the company stopped funding the game in July 2003 and formally canceled it in August. Rockstar Games acquired Red Dead Revolver from Capcom and resumed its development by December of that year. The crunch at Rockstar San Diego increased for a rapid release of the game, which came in May 2004 for the PlayStation 2 and Xbox.

In 2003, Rockstar San Diego began developing Agent, an open-world stealth game for the PlayStation 2 and Xbox, under the leadership of the producer Luis Gigliotti. The concept for an untitled Justice League game was scrapped in favor of Agent. Unlike previous Angel Studios games, the prototype stage for Agent began with a full-size team, which was given little time to complete the prototype, leading to crunch at the studio. Artists from the company traveled to Cairo and Washington, D.C., two of the settings for Agent, to capture reference photographs. The four artists who traveled to Cairo took more than 10,000 pictures. When police detained artists for their photography in both locations, the situation in D.C. was quickly resolved while the one in Cairo took significantly more time, and the development continued once both teams had returned. At the same time, Rockstar Games and the Houser brothers kept requesting changes so frequently the studio could not keep up, causing further crunch. Three people connected to the studio—one active employee and two former employees—died during this time, adding to a toxic studio culture. After a year of work, Gigliotti left the studio and formed Concrete Games for the publisher THQ. Eleven of Agent's lead developers immediately followed Gigliotti and several Red Dead Revolver leads were put in charge of Agent to compensate for these departures. Under the new leadership, the developers spent another year upgrading the internal game engine for Agent. Shortly thereafter, the game was put on hold indefinitely. The sister studio Rockstar North, which had been keen to create a game in that style, began working on a game of the same name that impressed developers at Rockstar San Diego. Although announced in 2009, this game was considered a distraction from the studio's other projects and canceled within a few years.

After Electronic Arts acquired Criterion Games in 2004, Rockstar San Diego established the RAGE Technology Group team to develop the Rockstar Advanced Game Engine (RAGE) from the Angel Game Engine. The engine was introduced with Rockstar Games Presents Table Tennis, which was also developed by the studio and released for the Xbox 360 and Wii in 2006. RAGE went on to be used in most of Rockstar Games's titles for personal computers and consoles, including Red Dead Redemption, Grand Theft Auto IV, Max Payne 3, Grand Theft Auto V, and Red Dead Redemption 2. Angel, until then Rockstar San Diego's president, had been working from the studio's offices, Rockstar Games's New York City headquarters, and Colombia since the acquisition and eventually decided not to renew his contract with Rockstar Games. The Houser brothers tried to persuade him to stay, but Angel felt homesick and left the company in May 2005 to return to Colombia. In Medellín, he tried to create game development opportunities, including through a master's degree in video game programming at EAFIT University. These attempts ultimately faltered due to a lack of government support and talent in the area. Alan Wasserman, who had joined Rockstar San Diego in 2003, became the studio's general manager in Angel's place. The studio opened two paid internship positions for Entertainment Technology Center students in December 2005 and soon began recruiting employees to produce next-generation games.

=== Red Dead Redemption and labor issues (2006–2011) ===
In August 2006, two former Rockstar San Diego 3D artists—Terri-Kim Chuckry and Garrett Flynn—filed a class-action lawsuit on behalf of over 100 ex-employees, claiming unpaid overtime compensation. The case, Garrett Flynn, et al. v. Angel Studios, Inc./Rockstar Games et al., was prepared with assistance from Thomas Urmy Jr. of the law firm Shapiro Haber & Urmy LLP, and it was settled out of court in April 2009 with Rockstar Games awarding the former employees $2.75 million. The wives of several Rockstar San Diego employees, under the pseudonym "Rockstar Spouse", published an open letter in January 2010, alleging executives had imposed poor working conditions on studio developers since March 2009. This was followed by several former employees anonymously and publicly describing similar experiences. While a former staffer at Rockstar Games confirmed the post's allegations, Rockstar Games denied all claims and said it was "saddened if any former members of any studio did not find their time here enjoyable or creatively fulfilling". The International Game Developers Association described the alleged working conditions as "deceptive, exploitative, and ultimately harmful".

In January 2010, it was reported that the company management had gradually laid off employees working on the Midnight Club series and outsourced its development. Other key employees quit rather than work on Red Dead Redemption. According to the senior designer Kris Roberts, Rockstar Games prioritized the Grand Theft Auto series over Midnight Club and subsequently canceled the studio's untitled fifth game in that series. During the development of Red Dead Redemption, mismanagement led to delays and increased development costs. Two months after the game's May 2010 release, about 40 of Rockstar San Diego's 180 staff members were laid off. Steve Martin, who had been a producer at the studio since 2009, succeeded Wasserman as the studio manager. The studio headcount shrank to 128 employees by February 2011. Red Dead Redemption became a commercial and critical success, selling 13 million copies within two years. Speaking to investors, Take-Two's chief executive officer, Strauss Zelnick, announced that the game would become one of the company's strategic "permanent franchises". The game won several year-end accolades, including multiple Game of the Year awards. Business Insider found that, as of 2022, Red Dead Redemption was the 40th-best game ever made when measured by critical reception scores.

=== Development collaborations (2011–present) ===
Beginning in 2011, Rockstar San Diego largely cooperated with other Rockstar Games studios. It played a supporting role (alongside Rockstar North and Rockstar Leeds) in the development of Team Bondi's 2011 game L.A. Noire. For 2012's Max Payne 3, Rockstar San Diego was part of Rockstar Studios, a collaborative effort of all Rockstar Games studios. To expand, the studio was hiring further employees by February 2012. Rockstar Games then paid $12.6 million in August 2014 to renew its lease on Rockstar San Diego's 52,726 square feet (4,898.4 m^{2}) of office space in the Faraday Corporate Center in Carlsbad for eight years. The studio collaborated with Rockstar North on Grand Theft Auto V, which was released in 2013. More recently, the company was one of eight studios that worked on Red Dead Redemption 2, which came out in 2018. The development of that game again faced allegations of labor issues. Some employees reported that they were ordered to work overtime, frequently doing 80-hour weeks. In July 2019, Martin left the company, later joining the Chinese conglomerate Tencent and opening the subsidiary studio Lightspeed LA. In his place, Rockstar San Diego re-hired its former technical director Tom Shepherd in September 2019, after he had been with The Initiative for 14 months. He and the art director Joshua Bass were appointed the joint studio heads. In September 2021, Rockstar Games leased the entirety of the Pacific View Corporate Center in Carlsbad—82,163 square feet (7,633.2 m^{2})—from Drawbridge Realty. Rockstar San Diego worked with the other Rockstar Games studios on Grand Theft Auto VI, which was released in November 2026. The studio led the design of ambient and interactive world elements.

== Games developed ==
=== As Angel Studios ===
List of games developed by Rockstar San Diego, 1994–2002
Year	Title	Platform(s)	Publisher(s)	Notes	Ref.
1994	Ecco: The Tides of Time	Sega CD	Sega	Supportive development for Novotrade International	
1996	Mr. Bones	Sega Saturn	Sega	Supportive development for Zono	
1998	Major League Baseball Featuring Ken Griffey Jr.	Nintendo 64	Nintendo		
1998	Virtual Jungle Cruise	—N/a		Exhibited at DisneyQuest theme parks	
1999	Savage Quest	Arcade	Interactive Light		
1999	Midtown Madness	Windows	Microsoft		
1999	Ken Griffey Jr.'s Slugfest	Nintendo 64	Nintendo		
1999	Resident Evil 2	Nintendo 64	Capcom	Port development	
2000	Sky Pirates VR	—N/a		Exhibited at GameWorks theme parks	
2000	Midtown Madness 2	Windows	Microsoft		
2000	Midnight Club: Street Racing	PlayStation 2	Rockstar Games		
2000	Smuggler's Run	PlayStation 2	Rockstar Games		
2001	Test Drive: Off-Road Wide Open	PlayStation 2, Xbox	Infogrames		
2001	Smuggler's Run 2	PlayStation 2	Rockstar Games		
2001	Transworld Surf	GameCube, PlayStation 2, Xbox	Infogrames		
2002	Smuggler's Run: Warzones	GameCube	Rockstar Games		

=== As Rockstar San Diego ===
List of games developed by Rockstar San Diego, 2002—present
Year	Title	Platform(s)	Publisher(s)	Notes	Ref.
2003	Midnight Club II	PlayStation 2, Windows, Xbox	Rockstar Games		
2003	SpyHunter 2	PlayStation 2, Xbox	Midway Games		
2004	Red Dead Revolver	PlayStation 2, Xbox	Rockstar Games		
2005	Midnight Club 3: Dub Edition	PlayStation 2, PlayStation Portable, Xbox	Rockstar Games		
2006	Midnight Club 3: Dub Edition Remix	PlayStation 2, Xbox	Rockstar Games		
2006	Rockstar Games Presents Table Tennis	Wii, Xbox 360	Rockstar Games		
2008	Midnight Club: Los Angeles	PlayStation 3, Xbox 360	Rockstar Games		
2010	Red Dead Redemption	Android, iOS, Nintendo Switch, Nintendo Switch 2, PlayStation 3, PlayStation 4, PlayStation 5, Windows, Xbox 360, Xbox Series X/S	Rockstar Games	Also developed the expansion pack Undead Nightmare (2010)	
2011	L.A. Noire	Nintendo Switch, PlayStation 3, PlayStation 4, Windows, Xbox 360, Xbox One	Rockstar Games	Supportive development for Team Bondi	
2012	Max Payne 3	macOS, PlayStation 3, Windows, Xbox 360	Rockstar Games	Developed as part of Rockstar Studios	
2013	Grand Theft Auto V	PlayStation 3, PlayStation 4, PlayStation 5, Windows, Xbox 360, Xbox One, Xbox Series X/S	Rockstar Games	Supportive development for Rockstar North	
2018	Red Dead Redemption 2	PlayStation 4, Stadia, Windows, Xbox One	Rockstar Games		
2026	Grand Theft Auto VI	PlayStation 5, Xbox Series X/S	Rockstar Games		

=== Canceled ===
- Ground Effect
- Buggie Boogie
- XGirl
- Oni 2: Death & Taxes
- Agent (Note: Not to be confused with the game of the same name developed by the sister studio Rockstar North and announced in 2009)
- Untitled fifth Midnight Club game
