= Midnight Club: Street Racing =

2000 video game

- The game's cover art featuring a Mazda MX-6, a Toyota Supra, and an NYPD Chevrolet Caprice
- Developers: Angel Studios (PS2); Rebellion Developments (GBA)
- Publishers: Rockstar Games (PS2); Destination Software (GBA)
- Director: Michael Limber
- Producer: Glen Hernandez
- Designers: Darren Chisum; Fredic Markus
- Programmers: Dave Etherton; Santiago Becerra
- Artists: Jennifer Terry; Scott Stoabs
- Series: Midnight Club
- Platforms: PlayStation 2 Game Boy Advance
- Release: PlayStation 2: NA: October 26, 2000; EU: November 24, 2000; AU: November 30, 2000; Game Boy Advance: NA: November 9, 2001; PAL: February 8, 2002
- Genre: Racing
- Modes: Single-player, multiplayer

Midnight Club: Street Racing is a 2000 racing video game developed by Angel Studios and published by Rockstar Games. It is the first installment of the Midnight Club franchise, which focuses on competitive street racing and the import scene. Two distinct versions of the game were released for the PlayStation 2 and Game Boy Advance platforms, the former being a launch title in North America.

The PlayStation 2 version received generally favorable reviews, while the Game Boy Advance version received mixed reviews. Estimated sales of the game were 1.5 million units, with series sales reaching 2.5 million in the United States.

== Gameplay ==
Midnight Club features racing in two fictional representations of real-world locales: New York City and London.

Midnight Club: Street Racing is a racing video game that focuses on the import scene and illegal street racing. Players can explore the open world or race in organized street races. A career mode has the player working their way up in the street racing world, defeating named opponents in various races, ultimately culminating in pink slip races to win the opponent's car. The game features numerous vehicles for the player to win throughout career and arcade modes, ranging from taxi cabs, buses, and other city vehicles to fictional representations of famous Toyota, Nissan, and Honda tuner cars.

Arcade mode allows players to compete in various game mode challenges and to play in two-player split-screen multiplayer. There are four race types: Head to Head, Waypoint, Capture the Flag, and Cruise. Players can again compete for pink slips from various racers. Each named racer has three variants of the same car, and the player earns these with successive wins. Each new version of the car features upgrades over the previous car. Environments have many destructible objects such as trees, bushes, lampposts, and trash cans. Each locale features police cars that will attempt to arrest the player based on their illegal actions.

Along with Turbo Esprit and Midtown Madness, the game pioneered the use of an open world environment design instead of predefined circuit tracks. Two locales are available to players: New York City and London. Each city contains landmarks from its respective real-life counterpart. Some of London's visible landmarks include Trafalgar Square, the Palace of Westminster, Big Ben, the River Thames, and the Tower Bridge. New York includes such landmarks as Times Square, the Empire State Building, the World Trade Center, Rockefeller Center, United Nations Plaza, Plaza Hotel, Madison Square Garden, Washington Square Park, the Wall Street Bull, Battery Park and Central Park.

== Plot ==
A mysterious group of urban street racers known as the Midnight Club race for pride, power, and glory in sleekly customized, enhanced sports cars. As a regular New York City cab driver, the player learns about this secret club and decides to join.

The player begins with a taxi cab, which is a relatively unmodified and slow vehicle. Through a series of races with different goals, they defeat other racers and win faster and more expensive vehicles. After winning the New York and London city championships, the player faces the world champion, whose identity is unknown to the other club members. After winning the race, the former world champion reveals herself to be a young Japanese woman named Anika, whose father manufactures concept cars in Japan. The player wins her concept car and becomes the new world champion of the Midnight Club.

== Development and release ==
Midnight Club was unveiled in January 2000 in a press release. The PlayStation 2 version was developed by Angel Studios and published by Rockstar Games. The Game Boy Advance version was developed by Rebellion Developments and published by Destination Software. They were released on October 26, 2000, and November 9, 2001, respectively. It was released alongside the North American release date of PlayStation 2 as a launch title. To promote Midnight Club, Rockstar Games received permission from the City of New York to shut down Times Square to photograph promotional material and box art for the game.

The game's soundtrack features music from house and techno artists Derrick May, Surgeon, and Aril Brikha, as well as drum 'n' bass artist Dom & Roland. Terry Donovan, COO of Rockstar Games, said that "their passion for creating superior music versus conforming to the industry standard is what makes them and their music truly unique," and further stated that the music represents the "dark" motivation of the members of the Midnight Club. Gameplay is locked to 30 frames per second.

== Reception ==
Reception

Aggregate score
Aggregator	Score	
Aggregator	GBA	PS2
Metacritic	50/100	78/100

Review scores
Publication	Score	
Publication	GBA	PS2
AllGame	1.5/5	N/A
CNET Gamecenter	N/A	6/10
Edge	N/A	5/10
Electronic Gaming Monthly	N/A	8.17/10 (Note: Three critics of Electronic Gaming Monthly gave the PlayStation 2 version each a score of 9/10, 8.5/10, and 7/10.)
EP Daily	N/A	5/10
Game Informer	N/A	7.5/10
GameFan	N/A	59% (Note: In GameFan's viewpoint of the PlayStation 2 version, three critics gave it each a score of 74, 55, and 47.)
GameRevolution	N/A	B−
GameSpot	N/A	8.4/10
IGN	4.5/10	8.6/10
Next Generation	N/A	4/5
Nintendo Power	2.9/5	N/A
Official U.S. PlayStation Magazine	N/A	4/5
USA Today	N/A	3.5/4

The PlayStation 2 version received "generally favorable reviews", while the Game Boy Advance version received "mixed or average" reviews, according to the review aggregation website Metacritic.

Douglass C. Perry of IGN was positive to the PS2 version of the game, citing the car selection, level design of the cities, graphics and "fun" gameplay in single and multiplayer. Jeff Gerstmann of GameSpot called it a "fun" arcade-style racer. Shawn Sanders of GameRevolution however was less positive to the game and cited the graphics as "bland". Kevin Rice of NextGen called it an "addictive" arcade racer with "excellent" graphics and a "rock-solid" framerate. Lamchop of GamePro concluded in one review, "If you're looking for some new nightlife on your PlayStation 2, you should definitely join the Club." (Note: GamePro gave the PlayStation 2 version three 4.5/5 scores for graphics, control, and fun factor, and 3.5/5 for sound in one review.) In another GamePro review, The Freshman called it "a good game that could have been great with a little more attention paid to really pushing the PS2. It's still one of the better launch titles, and a shoe-in for anyone who wants something different in their driving games library." (Note: GamePro gave the PlayStation 2 version three 4/5 scores for graphics, sound, and fun factor, and 4.5/5 for control in another review.)

For the GBA version, Nintendo Power called it a "decent" if not "repetitive" drive. Skyler Miller of AllGame felt that Midnight Club's GBA version was "a slow, confusing" version of Grand Theft Auto, but without the crime and the fun. IGN's Craig Harris noted that the top-down perspective, while efficient use of the Game Boy Advance's limited resources, made gameplay difficult, and that due to this perspective players will never know where the track is going. He felt this design choice forced trial-and-error gameplay and was very frustrating for players. Harris gave poor marks for the very basic AI drivers. Lastly, he criticized the password save system, with particular emphasis on the fact that if a player does not write down the password while on screen there is no way to recover that password, effectively causing players to lose progress.

In December 2000, the PlayStation 2 version ranked fifth in total PlayStation 2 game sales. In February 2001, the game placed ninth in overall sales. By July 2006, the PlayStation 2 version sold 1.5 million units and earned $43 million in the U.S. NextGen ranked it as the 32nd highest-selling game launched for the PlayStation 2, Xbox, or GameCube between October 2000 and July 2006 in that country. Combined sales of Midnight Club console releases reached 2.5 million units in the U.S. by the latter date. Midnight Club won the award for "Racing Game of 2000" in both Editors' Choice and Readers' Choice at IGN's Best of 2000 Awards for PS2. The PS2 version was a runner-up for the "Best Driving Game" and "Best Game No One Played" awards at GameSpot's Best and Worst of 2000 Awards, which went to Test Drive Le Mans and Samba de Amigo, respectively.
