= Major League Baseball Featuring Ken Griffey Jr. =

1998 baseball video game

- North American cover art
- Developer: Angel Studios
- Publisher: Nintendo
- Director: Jim Mcleod
- Producer: Diego Angel
- Artist: Daren Bader
- Composers: Jay Henry; Steve Adorno
- Platform: Nintendo 64
- Release: NA: May 26, 1998; AU: 1998
- Genre: Sports
- Modes: Single-player, multiplayer

Major League Baseball Featuring Ken Griffey Jr. is a 1998 baseball video game developed by Angel Studios and published by Nintendo for the Nintendo 64. The game is a follow-up to Nintendo's previous title featuring Griffey, Ken Griffey Jr.'s Winning Run. It was released in 1998, and allows players to choose any contemporary Major League Baseball franchise and play through an exhibition, a complete season, or a World Series. Players can also select up to four individuals from any team to compete in a Home Run Derby. The game also features all 30 MLB teams' stadiums. The game was seen as a faster, more arcade-like baseball game compared to its rivaling product, the more realistic baseball simulation All-Star Baseball '99. A sequel titled Ken Griffey Jr.'s Slugfest was released in 1999.

== Gameplay ==
Batters and fielders abilities are measured with five different statistics: Batting, Power, Speed, Defense, and Arm. Pitchers abilities are measured with three different statistics: Speed, Stamina, and Control. Statistics are measured by a number 1-10, with 1 being the weakest and 10 being the best.

Every pitcher in the game has four pitches. The first pitch, which is used by pressing the A button, is always a fastball. The second pitch, a breaking ball, is thrown by pressing the B button. Pitches thrown with the B button include curveballs, sliders, and screwballs. The third pitch is the changeup, and is used by pressing the Z button and the A button simultaneously. The fourth and final pitch is the "special." Special pitches include the super fastball, super changeup, splitter, cut fastball, and knuckleball. The special pitch is used by pressing the Z and B buttons at the same time.

Batters use the analog stick to move a batting circle to where the pitch is shown to go before it reaches the plate. The batter then presses A to swing. If the batting circle is placed where the ball is thrown, and the swing is on time to when the pitch goes over the plate, the ball will be hit. This feature can be turned off by changing the batting style to classic in the Options menu.

Baserunning on offense and throwing to bases on defense is controlled by the C buttons. The button pressed corresponds to the base (e.g. the right C button is pressed to go to 1st base, up to go to 2nd base, etc.).

The game accounts for injuries and real time fatigue, seen most clearly through pitchers. This is especially true if the pitcher uses their "special" pitch too often.

== Development ==
The game was originally due for release in the third quarter of 1997, but was pushed back to 1998.

The music was composed by Steve Adorno of the groups GQ, Devoshun, Seguida ny Latin Rock. On it he played drums, keys, guitar, and funk bass.

== Reception ==
Reception

Aggregate score
| Aggregator | Score |
|---|---|
| GameRankings | 80% |

Review scores
| Publication | Score |
|---|---|
| AllGame | 3/5 |
| Electronic Gaming Monthly | 7.25/10 |
| Game Informer | 7.5/10 |
| GameFan | 90% |
| GamePro | 3.5/5 |
| GameRevolution | C |
| GameSpot | 6.8/10 |
| IGN | 7.7/10 |
| N64 Magazine | 74% |
| Nintendo Power | 8.4/10 |

The game received favorable reviews according to the review aggregation website GameRankings.

== See also ==
- Ken Griffey Jr. Presents Major League Baseball
