= Red Dead =

Video game series

- Logo since 2010
- Genre: Action-adventure
- Developers: Rockstar San Diego; Rockstar Games
- Publisher: Rockstar Games
- Platforms: Various: PlayStation 2; Xbox; PlayStation 3; Xbox 360; PlayStation 4; Xbox One; Windows; Stadia; Nintendo Switch; Android; iOS; Nintendo Switch 2; PlayStation 5; Xbox Series X/S
- First release: Red Dead Revolver; May 4, 2004
- Latest release: Red Dead Online; May 14, 2019

Red Dead is a series of Western-themed action-adventure games published by Rockstar Games. The first entry in the series, Red Dead Revolver, was released on the PlayStation 2 and Xbox in May 2004. Originally developed by Capcom, Red Dead Revolver borrowed elements from their 1985 arcade title Gun.Smoke, to which it was intended to be a spiritual successor, but the game was cancelled in 2002. Rockstar subsequently acquired the rights to Red Dead Revolver and expanded on it.

Red Dead Redemption, developed by Rockstar San Diego (which also worked on its predecessor), was released in May 2010 for PlayStation 3 and Xbox 360 to critical and commercial acclaim. Selling over 15 million copies by 2017 and winning many year-end accolades from multiple gaming publications, the game is considered by critics to be one of the best games of all time. Multiple DLCs were added, including Undead Nightmare, a single-player expansion later released as a standalone game. A Game of the Year edition of the game includes all of the additional content.

Red Dead Redemption 2, developed by Rockstar Games, was released on October 26, 2018, for PlayStation 4 and Xbox One, November 5, 2019, for Windows, and on November 19, 2019, for Stadia. The game was also widely acclaimed and a commercial success, generating $725 million in revenue in three days and selling 23 million copies in two weeks. It is considered an example of video games as an art form and it is also regarded by critics as one of the greatest video games ever made. Its online multiplayer component, Red Dead Online, was released in beta on November 27, 2018, to mixed reviews, with a full release on May 15, 2019, which received more positive reviews.

== Games ==
List of games in the Red Dead series
Year	Title	Developer	Platform(s)
2004	Red Dead Revolver	Rockstar San Diego	PlayStation 2; Xbox
2010	Red Dead Redemption: Gunslingers (Note: Social RPG released as a Facebook application to promote the release of Red Dead Redemption)	Rockstar Games	—
2010	Red Dead Redemption	Rockstar San Diego (Note: Nintendo Switch, PlayStation 4, and Windows versions developed by Double Eleven)	PlayStation 3; Xbox 360; Nintendo Switch; PlayStation 4; Windows; Android; iOS; Nintendo Switch 2; PlayStation 5; Xbox Series X/S
2010	Red Dead Redemption: Undead Nightmare (Note: Non-canonical expansion to Red Dead Redemption)	Rockstar San Diego	PlayStation 3; Xbox 360; Nintendo Switch; PlayStation 4; Windows; Android; iOS; Nintendo Switch 2; PlayStation 5; Xbox Series X/S
2018	Red Dead Redemption 2	Rockstar Games (Note: Rockstar Games was a collaborative effort between all of Rockstar's studios functioning as a single team.)	PlayStation 4; Xbox One; Windows; Stadia
2019	Red Dead Online (Note: Online component to Red Dead Redemption 2)	Rockstar Games	PlayStation 4; Xbox One; Windows; Stadia
Notes:

Release timeline
2004	Red Dead Revolver
2005
2006
2007
2008
2009
2010	Red Dead Redemption: Gunslingers
2010	Red Dead Redemption
2010	Undead Nightmare
2011
2012
2013
2014
2015
2016
2017
2018	Red Dead Redemption 2
2019	Red Dead Online

=== Red Dead Revolver ===
Red Dead Revolver is the first entry in the series, released for PlayStation 2 and Xbox in 2004. Set in the 1880s, during the American Old West, Red Dead Revolver follows bounty hunter Red Harlow as he uncovers the plot that killed his parents years ago and exacts revenge on those responsible. In terms of canonicity to the Redemption followup series, Dan Houser suggested that Revolver is set in a separate universe, but a version of the events in the plot could still have taken place due to the nature of legends told in the Red Dead games' world.

=== Red Dead Redemption ===
Red Dead Redemption is the second installment in the Red Dead series, and the spiritual successor to Red Dead Revolver. The game released in 2010 for PlayStation 3 and Xbox 360. The game takes place in the year 1911, during the decline of the American Old West and the Mexican Revolution. A spiritual successor to Red Dead Revolver, the game follows John Marston, a former outlaw, whose family is kidnapped by the Bureau of Investigation. In exchange for his family's return, John sets out to hunt down the surviving members of his former gang, in the process achieving closure and redemption for his past actions.

Undead Nightmare is a non-canonical expansion to Red Dead Redemption that follows John's efforts to find a cure for a zombie plague that has infected his family. A standalone disc, titled Red Dead Redemption: Undead Nightmare Collection, which does not require the original Red Dead Redemption game to be played, was released in North America on November 22, 2010. Red Dead Redemption and Undead Nightmare were released for the Nintendo Switch and PlayStation 4 on August 17, 2023, and for Windows on October 29, 2024, developed by Double Eleven; it is scheduled for release on Android, iOS, Nintendo Switch 2, PlayStation 5, and Xbox Series X/S on December 2, 2025, developed by Double Eleven and Cast Iron Games.

=== Red Dead Redemption 2 ===
Red Dead Redemption 2 is a prequel to Red Dead Redemption and the third main entry in the series, released for PlayStation 4 and Xbox One in October 2018 and for Windows and Stadia in November 2019. Its story follows Arthur Morgan, a member of the infamous Van der Linde gang in 1899, in the waning years of the American Old West, and the extinction of the age of outlaws and gunslingers. The game features several returning characters from Red Dead Redemption, including a younger and less-refined John Marston, his family, Uncle, and fellow gang members Dutch van der Linde, Bill Williamson, and Javier Escuella. A lot of focus is put on Arthur's morality and relationship with other characters, primarily John, with whom he has a brotherly-like bond, and Dutch, whom he views as a father figure and mentor—and who slowly descends into madness as the gang faces more problems.

Red Dead Online is the multiplayer component of Red Dead Redemption 2 and was released in May 2019, after several months in beta. Set one year before the single-player story, in 1898, it follows a customizable silent protagonist who is framed for murder and arrested. After being broken out of prison, the player is tasked by their rescuers with finding the true culprits in exchange for proving their innocence. Since release, the game has received several content updates that expanded upon the game modes, missions, and other activities players can partake in. A standalone client for the game was released in December 2020.

=== Future ===
In October 2018, Dan Houser said that Rockstar might develop a future entry in the series depending on the success of Red Dead Redemption 2.

== Common elements ==
=== Gameplay ===
In each game in the franchise, the player takes the role of an outlaw in the waning years of the American Old West. All three titles are third-person (although Red Dead Redemption 2 also gives the option to play in first-person), yet there are crucial differences between them. The first game in the series follows a linear storyline with fixed, limited locations. Red Dead Redemption, however, provides the player with an open world setting and gives them various options for exploration, random encounters and side-missions. Red Dead Redemption 2 is the biggest and most immersive of the three, providing far more options and activities for the player than in its previous titles. Combat and gunplay are a fundamental part in the franchise; players can cover, hip-fire, free-aim and can get into physical altercations with enemies. A large number of weapons are introduced in all three games, typically rifles and revolvers. Horses, stagecoaches and trains are the primary methods of transportation in all three games due to the period in which they are set.

==== Dead Eye ====
The trademark game mechanic of the series is the Dead Eye system, which bridges the gap between the protagonist's exceptional shooting prowess and the limitations of the human player's speed and coordination. For a short period, it allows the player to aim at targets in slow motion for better accuracy. After painting their targets, time goes back to normal as the player then attacks with a flurry of bullets in rapid succession. The Dead Eye system in Red Dead Redemption and Red Dead Redemption 2 has been refined, as it levels up as the game progresses, giving the player more options when using it.

==== Honor ====
Red Dead Redemption brings a new mechanic to the franchise that has been improved in Red Dead Redemption 2: a morality system where the player gains positive or negative "honor". Good deeds like saving townsfolk from danger will level up the player's honor, while malicious actions like harming innocents or committing theft will lower the player's honor. The player should be considerate of the honor system, as it can influence how the world interacts with the character.

=== Setting ===
All games in the series take place during the days of the Wild West. Red Dead Revolver takes place at an unidentified point in time during the 1880s, while Redemption is set primarily in 1911 (with the epilogue set in 1914), and Redemption 2 is set mainly in 1899 (with the epilogue set in 1907). While Revolver's aesthetics and atmosphere are reminiscent of the films set during the Wild West, the other two games depict the final two decades of this time period, as new factories, machines, motor vehicles, and modern technology appear all throughout the United States, marking the modernization of society. In Redemption and Redemption 2, the map undergoes several changes between the two different time periods, such as new houses being built, and NPCs sporting new looks.

Red Dead Revolver's setting is quite transient, as Red moves from town to town throughout the game. The most prominent location is the town of Brimstone, which acts as a hub between several missions. The game takes place in the United States, in an unidentified region of mostly desert, although some levels also feature a forest or mountain setting.

Red Dead Redemption offers the player a more significant interaction with the environment, and its location is bigger than in the previous game. It ranges from canyons to deserts, but the player is unable to reach to the outer limit due to the borders surrounding the area (mountains and deep ravines). There are several towns and settlements that the player can visit, each with their own citizens (with whom the player can interact). The map spans two fictional U.S. states, New Austin (which is mostly desert) and West Elizabeth (which features lush forests and a mountain area), as well as the Mexican state of Nuevo Paraiso (which is also mainly a desert area).

Red Dead Redemption 2’s world is greatly expanded compared to its predecessor's, and is far more immersive, lifelike and responsive. Both New Austin and West Elizabeth from Red Dead Redemption make a return, although they have been expanded with new regions and towns, while three new states have been added: Ambarino (which is mostly a mountain wilderness), New Hanover (a wide valley that incorporates multiple small settlements, including the town of Valentine), and Lemoyne (composed of bayous and plantations, and the location of the small town of Rhodes and the large industrial city of Saint Denis).

=== Characters ===
The following list contains only main and supporting characters from the Red Dead franchise, who play a significant role in the narrative of the game(s) they appear in.

Character	Red Dead Revolver	Red Dead Redemption			Red Dead Redemption 2	
Character	Red Dead Revolver	Single-player	Multiplayer	Undead Nightmare	Single-player	Red Dead Online
Character	2004	2010			2018	
Cast
Red Harlow	Robert Bogue Jason Fuchs (young)	Mentioned	Robert Bogue		Mentioned	
John Marston		Rob Wiethoff	Rob Wiethoff	Rob Wiethoff	Rob Wiethoff	
Arthur Morgan					Roger Clark	
Jack Swift	Gregg Martin	Mentioned	Gregg Martin			
Annie Stoakes	Carrie Keranen	Mentioned	Carrie Keranen			
Shadow Wolf	Chaske Spencer	Mentioned	Chaske Spencer			
Buffalo Soldier	Benton Greene		Benton Greene			
Sheriff Bartlett	Gene Jones					
Nate Harlow	Kurt Rhoads	Mentioned				
Falling Star	Messeret Stroman	Mentioned				
Governor Griffon / "Griff"	Bert Pence	Mentioned				
General Javier Diego	Robert Jimenez	Mentioned				
Colonel Daren	Dennis Ostermaier	Mentioned				
Mr. Kelley	Joseph Melendez	Mentioned	Joseph Melendez			
"Curly" Shaw	Lloyd Floyd					
"Bloody" Tom	Christian Tanno					
"Ugly" Chris Bailey	Erick Devine		Erick Devine			
Sheriff O'Grady	Stephen Schnetzer					
Pig Josh	Dennis Ostermaier		Dennis Ostermaier			
Bad Bessie	Heather Simms	Mentioned				
Mr. Black	Geoffrey Arend	Mentioned				
Professor Perry	Geoffrey Arend					
Katie O'Grady	Ursula Abbott					
Grizzly	Erick Devine					
John "Jack" Marston Jr.		Josh Blaylock	Josh Blaylock	Josh Blaylock	Marissa Buccianti (1899) Ted Sutherland (1907)	
Abigail Marston (née Roberts)		Sophia Marzocchi	Sophia Marzocchi	Sophia Marzocchi	Cali Elizabeth Moore	
Dutch van der Linde		Benjamin Byron Davis	Benjamin Byron Davis		Benjamin Byron Davis	
Bill Williamson		Steve J. Palmer	Steve J. Palmer		Steve J. Palmer	
Javier Escuella		Antonio Jaramillo	Antonio Jaramillo		Gabriel Sloyer	
Uncle		Spider Madison	Spider Madison	Spider Madison	James McBride John O'Creagh (singing voice)	
Edgar Ross		Jim Bentley	Jim Bentley		Jim Bentley	
Archer Fordham		David Wilson Barnes			Character is silent	
Bonnie MacFarlane		Kimberly Irion	Kimberly Irion	Kimberly Irion	Mentioned	Kimberly Irion
Drew MacFarlane		Chuck Kelley	Chuck Kelley	Chuck Kelley	Mentioned	Mentioned
Marshal Leigh Johnson		Anthony De Longis	Anthony De Longis	Anthony De Longis		
Deputy Jonah		Brad Carter	Brad Carter	Brad Carter		
Deputy Eli		Frank Noon	Frank Noon	Frank Noon		
Nigel West Dickens		Don Creech	Don Creech	Don Creech	Mentioned	
Seth Briars		Kevin Glikmann	Kevin Glikmann	Kevin Glikmann		
Irish		Kevin Harrison Sweeney	Kevin Harrison Sweeney			
Colonel Agustín Allende		Gary Carlos Cervantes	Gary Carlos Cervantes			
Captain Vincente de Santa		Hector Luis Bustamante	Hector Luis Bustamante	Hector Luis Bustamante		
Captain Espinoza		David Anzuelo				
Abraham Reyes		Josh Segarra	Josh Segarra	Josh Segarra		
Luisa Fortuna		Francesca Galeas	Francesca Galeas			
Landon Ricketts		Ross Hagen	Ross Hagen	Ross Hagen	Mentioned	
Professor Harold MacDougal		Joe Ochman	Joe Ochman	Joe Ochman		
Nastas		Benjamin Byron Davis	Benjamin Byron Davis	Benjamin Byron Davis		
Norman Deek		James Carroll				
D.S. MacKenna		Jay O. Sanders		Jay O. Sanders		
Mother Superior Calderón		Irene DeBari		Irene DeBari	Irene DeBari	
Sadie Adler					Alex McKenna	Alex McKenna
Charles Smith					Noshir Dalal	
Micah Bell III					Peter Blomquist	
Hosea Matthews					Curzon Dobell	
Leonard "Lenny" Summers					Harron Atkins	
Susan Grimshaw					Kaili Vernoff	
Sean MacGuire					Michael Mellamphy	Michael Mellamphy
Simon Pearson					Jim Santangeli	
Leopold Strauss					Howard Pinhasik	
Mary-Beth Gaskill					Samantha Strelitz	
Tilly Jackson					Meeya Davis	
Karen Jones					Jo Armeniox	
Molly O'Shea					Penny O'Brien	
Josiah Trelawny					Stephen Gevedon	Stephen Gevedon
Reverend Orville Swanson					Sean Haberle	
Kieran Duffy					Pico Alexander	
Mary Linton					Julie Jesneck	
Leviticus Cornwall					John Rue	Mentioned
Andrew Milton					John Hickok	
Colm O'Driscoll					Andrew Berg	
Catherine Braithwaite					Ellen Harvey	
Sheriff Leigh Gray					Tim McGeever	Tim McGeever
Tavish Gray					Madison Arnold	
Deputy Archibald MacGregor'					Greg Hildreth	Greg Hildreth
Beau Gray					Bjorn Thorstad	
Penelope Braithwaite					Alison Barton	
Angelo Bronte					Jim Pirri	
Colonel Alberto Fussar					Alfredo Narciso	
Levi Simon					Jeffrey Gurner	
Hercule Fontaine					Guyviaud Joseph	
Rains Fall					Graham Greene	
Eagle Flies					Jeremiah Bitsui	
Colonel Henry Favours					Malachy Cleary	
Captain Lyndon Monroe					Jake Silbermann	
Cleet					P.J. Sosko	
Joe					Ian Bedford	Ian Bedford
Anthony Foreman					David St. Louis	David St. Louis
Thomas Downes					Peter Lettre	
Edith Downes					Jayme Lake	
Archie Downes					Paul Thode	
David Geddes					Jeff McCarthy	
Jesicca LeClerk						Lisa Datz
Horley						Larry Bull
Old Man Jones						Gary Desbien
Marshal Tom Davies						Mike Keller
Samson Finch						Julian Rozzell
Alfredo Montez						Emilio Delgado
Teddy Brown						Daniel Stewart Sherman
Amos Lancing						Unknown
Jeremiah Shaw						Unknown
JB Cripps						Larry Kenney
Madam Nazar						Daniella Rabbani
The Woman With No Name						Ebony Blake
Maggie Fike						Stephanie Roth Haberle
Lemuel "Lem" Fike						Unknown
Danny-Lee Caton						Unknown
Reid Hixon						Unknown
Harriet Davenport						Emilea Wilson
Gus Macmillan						Unknown

Note: A gray cell indicates that the character does not appear in that medium.

== Reception ==
Aggregate review scores
Game	Metacritic
Red Dead Revolver	(PS2) 73/100 (Xbox) 74/100
Red Dead Redemption	(PS3) 95/100 (X360) 95/100 (NS) 83/100 (PS4) 77/100
Undead Nightmare	(PS3) 87/100 (X360) 87/100
Red Dead Redemption 2	(PS4) 97/100 (XONE) 97/100 (PC) 93/100

The Red Dead series, particularly the second and third games, are critically acclaimed. Red Dead Redemption is among the highest-rated games on Metacritic, with its score of 95. It is ranked the sixth-highest rated PlayStation 3 and seventh-highest rated Xbox 360 game. It has since won numerous awards, including Game of the Year by GameSpy and GameSpot, and is considered to be one of the greatest games of all time. Reviewers praised the visuals, music, acting, open world gameplay and the story. A Game of the Year edition containing all additional content was released in October 2011. Red Dead Redemption 2, averaging 97% for both console platforms on Metacritic, was also widely acclaimed by critics, who praised the same aspects as well as its significant level of detail, winning a number of awards from publications.

=== Sales ===
Red Dead Revolver sold 920,000 copies in North America as of July 2, 2010. Red Dead Redemption broke the records of its previous game, having shipped over 11 million copies by August 2011 and over 15 million copies by February 2017.Red Dead Redemption 2 however, marked the franchise's highest commercial achievement. In three days, the game generated $725 million in revenue, officially having the largest opening weekend in the history of entertainment, as well as being the second highest-selling entertainment launch, behind Grand Theft Auto V, another widely popular title from Rockstar Games. Two weeks after launch, the game shipped over 17 million units, thus exceeding its predecessors' lifetime sales. By September 2026, the Red Dead Redemption games had shipped almost 118 million units, including over 89 million for Redemption 2.
