= Development of Red Dead Redemption =

Development of 2010 video game

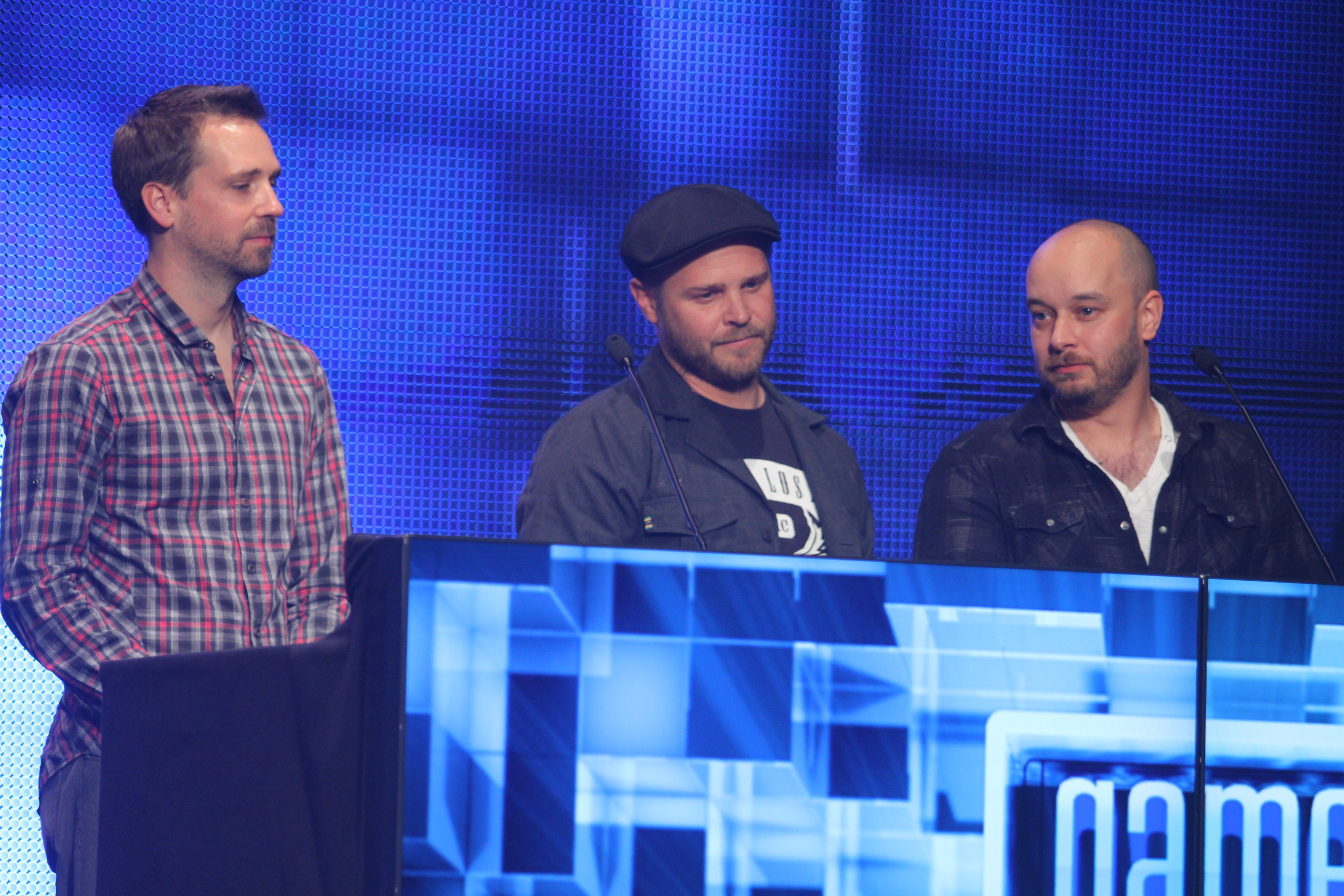
Part of Red Dead Redemption's leadership team: (left to right) technical director Ted Carson, art director Josh Bass, and producer Steve Martin at the Game Developers Choice Awards

A team of approximately 1,000 people developed Red Dead Redemption over five years. Rockstar Games published the action-adventure game in May 2010 for the PlayStation 3 and Xbox 360. (Note: Red Dead Redemption and Undead Nightmare's single-player modes were released for the Nintendo Switch and PlayStation 4 in August 2023 and for Windows in October 2024, developed by Double Eleven, and for Android, iOS, Nintendo Switch 2, PlayStation 5, and Xbox Series X/S in December 2025, developed by Double Eleven and Cast Iron Games.) A spiritual successor to the 2004 game Red Dead Revolver, its development was led by Rockstar San Diego's core 180-person team, who collaborated with Rockstar's Leeds, New England, North, and Toronto teams to assist development; Rockstar North, developer of the Grand Theft Auto series, consulted in the creation of the open world. After its announcement in 2009, the game was fervently promoted with press showings, cinematic trailers, and viral marketing strategies. Its release date, though subject to several delays, was widely anticipated. The working hours and managerial style of the studio during development were met with public complaints from staff members.

The open world setting constituted much of the development effort; its three primary regions each represent iconic features of the American frontier. Key team members conducted field trips to Washington, D.C. to capture a multitude of photographs, and several classic Western films, television shows, and novels were analyzed for research. Rockstar improved its proprietary Rockstar Advanced Game Engine to increase its animation and draw distance rendering capabilities; the team felt the seventh generation of video game consoles were necessary to achieve their ideal vision, having exhausted the use of older hardware on previous projects. The game was envisioned to improve the core mechanics of Red Dead Revolver by scaling it up to the standard of other Rockstar games, maintaining key gameplay elements like the Dead Eye and dueling mechanics but majorly overhauling the experience otherwise.

Red Dead Redemption's 1,500-page script was written in two years. The game's setting in 1911 was chosen to demonstrate the transformation of the old West into a modern civilization. The developers underwent a secretive audition process to cast its characters. Performance capture was used to record the actors' movements, faces, and voices simultaneously. Rod Edge directed the actors' performances in a studio in Santa Monica, California. The game features around 450 characters, and required a large amount of dialogue for the world to feel alive, comparable to Rockstar's previous game Grand Theft Auto IV (2008). Researchers at Rockstar developed a style guide based on real phrases of the time period. Red Dead Redemption features an original score composed over fifteen months by Bill Elm and Woody Jackson, who engaged several other musicians to create approximately 200 tracks.

== History and overview ==
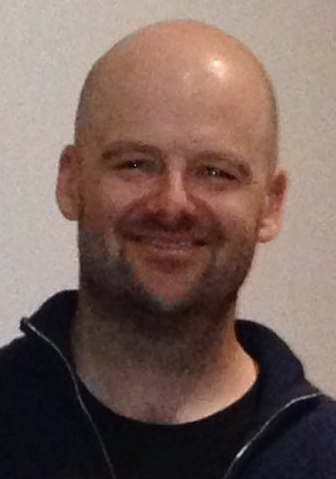
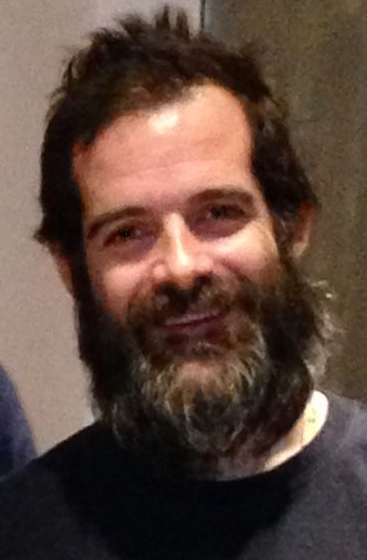
Dan Houser (left) co-wrote the narrative with Michael Unsworth and Christian Cantamessa, while his brother Sam Houser (right) executive-produced the game.

Publisher Rockstar Games acquired the Western-themed video game Red Dead Revolver from Capcom in 2003 after years of development—partly because it wanted the rights to the franchise for its own Western game—and Rockstar San Diego completed development within nine months. After its May 2004 release, Rockstar wanted to create its own Western game from scratch as it felt Revolver "didn't fundamentally play like a Rockstar game". The studio's work on Revolver and Bully (2006) helped the development team understand the important elements of open world games and blending different genres with the core gameplay of its flagship series Grand Theft Auto. However, the team understood it would require the seventh generation of video game consoles—namely the PlayStation 3 and Xbox 360—to achieve their ideal vision. Preliminary work on Red Dead Redemption began by 2005, with a small team at Rockstar San Diego working on the first teaser shown during Sony's E3 conference in May as an early technology demonstration for the PlayStation 3. Full development commenced in 2006, following the formation of a core development team led by lead designer and co-writer Christian Cantamessa, technical director Ted Carson, and art directors Josh Bass and Daren Bader; Cantamessa had worked with Rockstar on Grand Theft Auto: San Andreas (2004), while Carson, Bass, and Bader had worked on Revolver.

Rockstar San Diego's core 180-person team co-opted studios around the world owned by Rockstar Games to facilitate the five-year development between a full team of over 1,000. Rockstar Leeds and Rockstar North assisted with development; Rockstar co-founder and vice president for creativity Dan Houser felt the studio collaboration had become successful by 2009. Some staffers from Rockstar Leeds, including studio head Gordon Hall, spent one year in the United States to work on the game on-site. Rockstar New England was contracted to assist with development, an experience several former employees later lamented due to "endless" crunch and the fact it contributed to the indefinite hold put on the development of a sequel to Bully. According to environment artist Matt Kazan, Rockstar Toronto worked on the game in 2008, upgrading visual assets for seventh generation consoles from those intended for sixth generation consoles, PlayStation 2 and Xbox, for which Kazan claimed the game was originally planned. Analyst estimations place the game's development budget between US$80 million and US$100 million, making it one of the most expensive video games to develop.

The wives of several Rockstar San Diego employees, under the pseudonym "Rockstar Spouse", published an open letter in January 2010, alleging executives had imposed poor working conditions on studio developers since March 2009. The letter outlined unethical working practices in place at Rockstar San Diego during the game's development, including twelve-hour work days and six-day weeks, with lower-than-industry-average salary increases. Other former employees described the project as "an organic disaster of the most epic proportions"; it was reported key employees decided to quit rather than work on Red Dead Redemption and mismanagement led to delays and increased development costs. This was followed by several former employees anonymously and publicly describing similar experiences. While a former Rockstar staffer confirmed the claims, Rockstar denied them and said it was "saddened if any former members of any studio did not find their time here enjoyable or creatively fulfilling".

The International Game Developers Association described the alleged working conditions as "deceptive, exploitative, and ultimately harmful". Less than two months after the game's release, about 40 of Rockstar San Diego's 180 staff members were laid off, which Rockstar described as "typical with game development" as it realigned its resources for future development projects. In the wake of Red Dead Redemption 2's own overtime controversy in 2018, Rockstar's head of publishing Jennifer Kolbe admitted the Rockstar Spouse letter represented a problematic time for the company's work practices but emphasized changes to its workflow to avoid similar situations in the future. As part of his lawsuit against Rockstar in April 2016, producer Leslie Benzies released emails he received from Rockstar president and co-founder Sam Houser in October 2009 claiming the game was a "nightmare" and he needed Benzies's assistance in preparing to demonstrate the game to partners like Microsoft and Sony. According to the lawsuit, work on the game was completed "within a few months" after Benzies stepped in.

== Story and setting ==
The game's world was a critical element of development for the team, who sought a sense of scale, immersion, and discovery for the player.

Dan Houser, Michael Unsworth, and Christian Cantamessa wrote Red Dead Redemption's 1,500-page script in two years. Taking inspiration from films like The Wild Bunch (1969), High Plains Drifter (1973), Unforgiven (1992) and The Proposition (2005), the team felt most Western fiction takes place between 1840 and 1880 and Red Dead Redemption's setting in 1911 allowed a more intriguing analysis of the transformation from "the old West" into the modern world. Cantamessa described the overarching theme as "the 'Death of the West' rather than the more conventional 'Myth of the West' that is often seen in the classic John Wayne films". Houser found "a classical 'we are conquering this wilderness' story" to be less interesting, and the time period had the added benefit of allowing strong images of the West—horses, stagecoaches, and lassoes—alongside modern technology like trains and explosives. Lead mission designer Silas Morse felt the limitations set by the time period—weapons, methods of travel, types of enemies—ultimately immersed the player and set the game apart from others. While the game is not an intentional satire on contemporary America, Houser admitted parallels were inevitable. Houser wanted the game to have a serious tone akin to The Wild Bunch, though avoiding topics like existentialism as in the work of Ingmar Bergman. While Houser admitted to having seen several Western films, he tried to avoid considering them in writing the story, wanting it instead to develop naturally. The game's Mexico section was inspired by The Wild Bunch and The Treasure of the Sierra Madre (1948), while the action sequences borrowed visual elements from classic shoot-out scenes, including from non-Western films like Heat (1995).

The allusions to politics throughout the narrative are supposed to represent the darker undertones surrounding the foundations of the American Dream. In addition, the game itself exhibits qualities relating to the movement from a "violent freedom" to a situation of "overt state control", told through a story of innocence and freedom. Houser expressed the difficulty in maintaining realism while balancing the game's narrative to avoid feeling both "pompous" and "camp", citing Blazing Saddles (1974) as an example of the latter. Houser felt the story does not fully represent the racial attitudes commonly associated with the game's era, a choice made by the developers to avoid language that "is insanely offensive to modern ears". The team focused more on the combination of old and modern America and the change experienced during this period. Regarding the game's depiction of violence, the team wanted it to "feel slightly raw and unpleasant"—more like Cormac McCarthy's Blood Meridian (1985) than Little House on the Prairie (1974–1983)—attempting realism without exaggeration. The team hoped for an "emotional response" from players, with immersion in the game world and time period.

The game's world was a critical element of development; the team sought a sense of scale, immersion, and discovery for the player. To make the world feel alive, the team developed schedules for the non-player characters (NPCs), giving them tasks to complete and locations to attend instead of repeating basic tasks. Each NPC has specific outfits and dialogue to ensure each encounter felt fresh to the player. When designing the game's fictional locations, the team tried to represent iconic features of the time period, gradually revealing them to provide more visual and sociological variety to the player: New Austin features small towns and outposts, representing the final elements of wilderness and lawlessness before the development of modern America; Nuevo Paraíso includes rebel outposts and Mexican army forts, run by political and rebellious leaders amidst a civil war; and West Elizabeth is a verdant land representing the civilized and advanced areas of the world. The American frontier was extensively researched for the game; the team organized field trips to Washington, D.C., visiting the Library of Congress and the National Archives Building, captured a multitude of photographs, and analyzed various classic Western films, television shows, and novels. A challenge the team faced as a direct result of the world's size was to include enough content to interest players. Using this challenge as a strength and a major part of the design process, the team tried to make the countryside wild, with a variety of potential events to occur. They initially considered using the open world formula of Grand Theft Auto IV (2008)—a large variety of mission styles with different activities and objectives—but soon realized the emptiness of the world forced the direction elsewhere, instead filling the world with a realistic ecosystem with over 40 animals. The initial placement of animals throughout the game world felt "fake" to the team, prompting them to develop a system in which the animals had rules and specific behaviors, leading to more unpredictable encounters.

== Character development ==
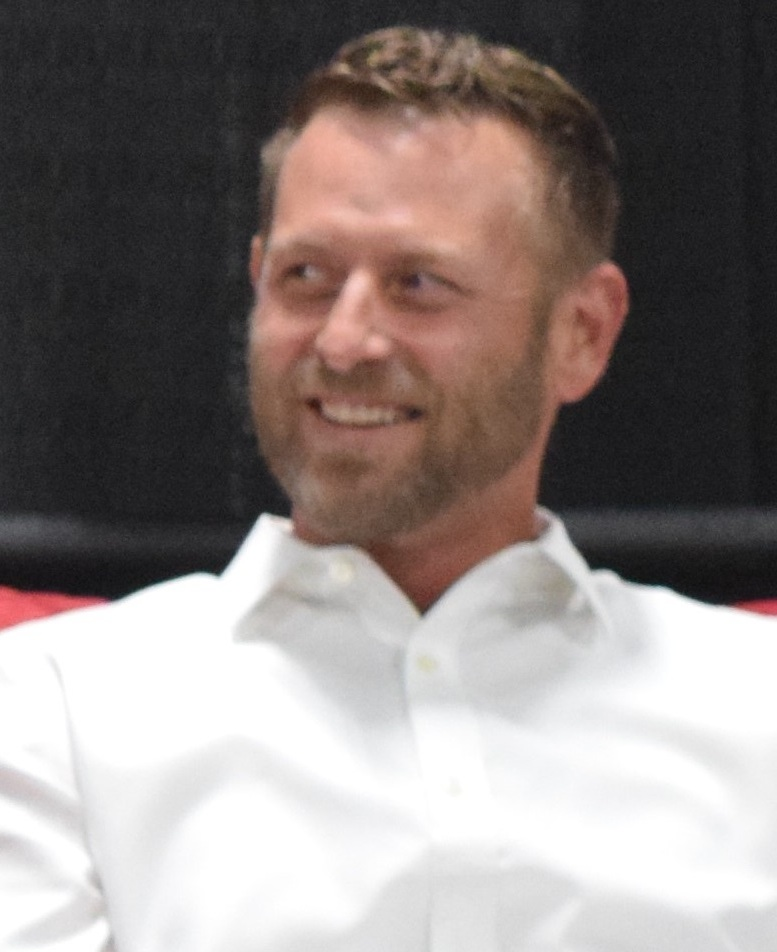
Rob Wiethoff

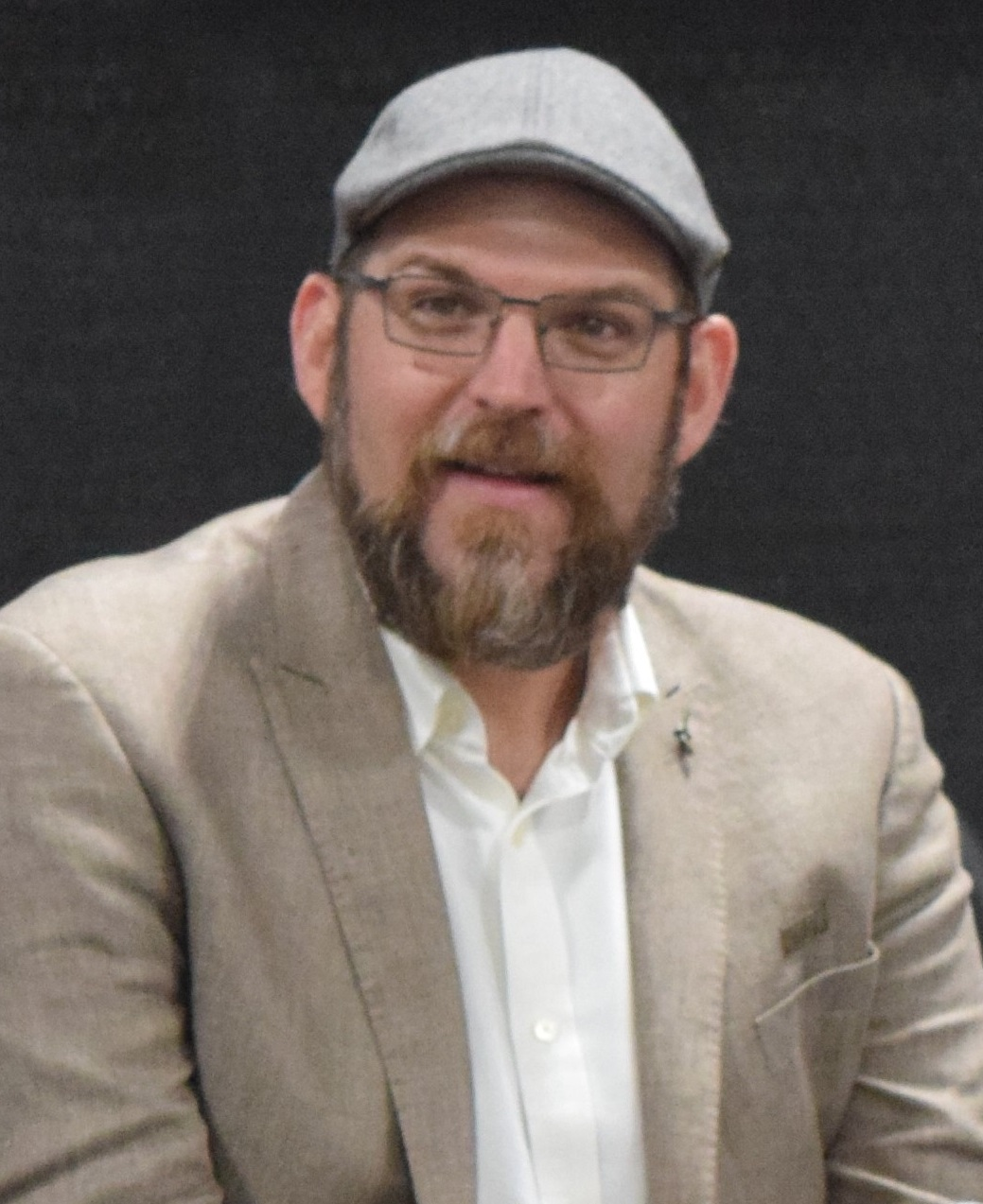
Steve J. Palmer

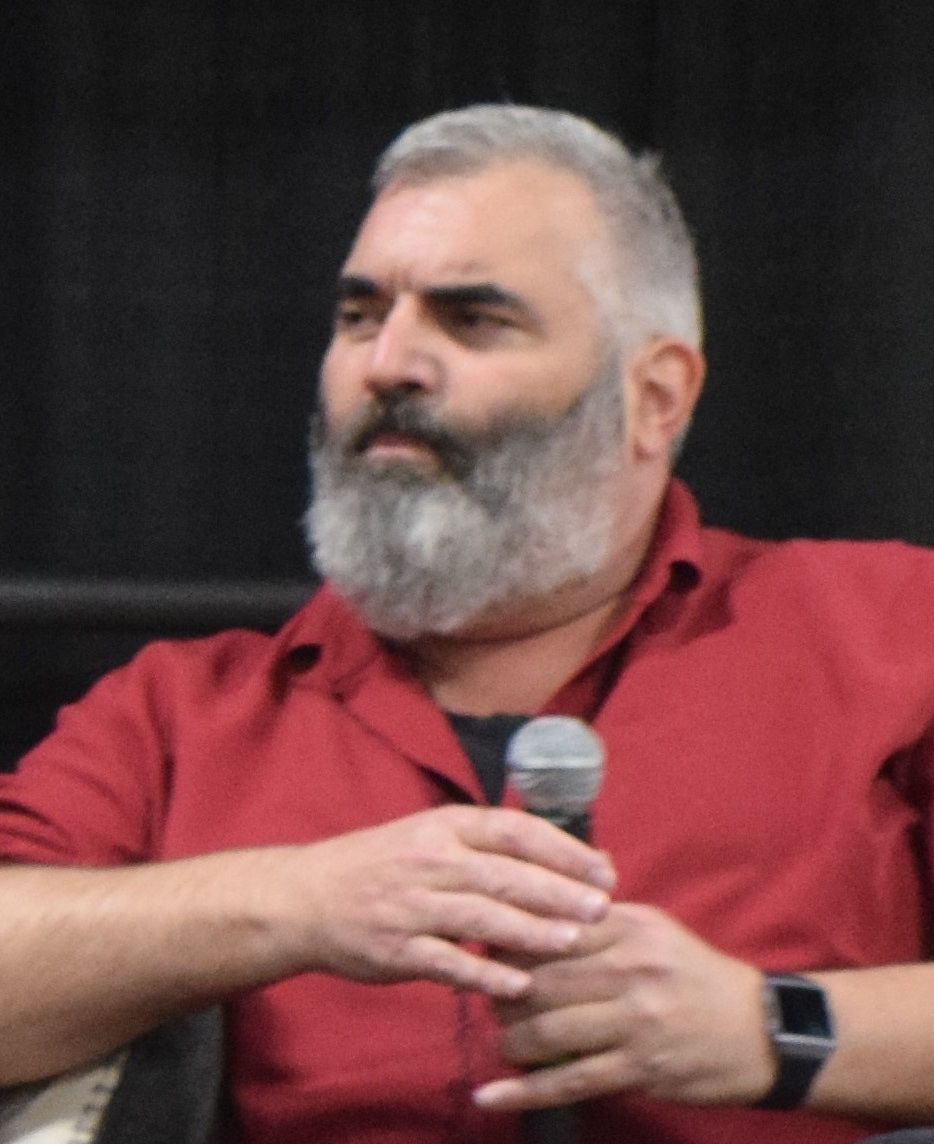
Benjamin Byron Davis

Wiethoff, Palmer, and Davis portrayed John Marston, Bill Williamson, and Dutch van der Linde, respectively.

Red Dead Redemption features around 450 characters, with a cast of approximately 100 incidental and 50 main performers. The game required a large amount of character dialogue in order to feel alive, due in part to the improved technology. Houser compared the amount of dialogue required to Grand Theft Auto IV and felt the team was "halfway there" with its prior work on San Andreas and Bully. Several employees across the company worked on different parts of the script, such as the main story and pedestrian dialogue, a process Rockstar began with Grand Theft Auto: Vice City (2002). Researchers at Rockstar developed a style guide based on real sayings of the time period, which was used to write all dialogue; Houser was originally worried he had never written dialogue that was not in a contemporary setting, but felt they eventually found a "sweet spot". He found the time period lent itself to humorous dialogue, particularly due to items like drugs, patented medicine, and Sears catalogs. The team wanted to create a story that mixed with the game's mechanics to result in a fun and organic experience. As the story developed, a range of characters were organically created based on the period. The character of Edgar Ross was partly inspired by lawyer and political activist Charles Joseph Bonaparte, while other characters were inspired by historical figures of the 20th century including Frank James, Pearl Hart, and Tom Horn. In terms of the random NPC dialogue, Houser felt Red Dead Redemption sits between Bully, in which NPCs remember the protagonist, and Grand Theft Auto, in which NPCs are unaware of the protagonist's identity; in Red Dead Redemption, some NPCs remember the player's action, but less precisely than in Bully.

To cast the characters, the team held auditions; until actors were officially signed to the project, it was only known as an "untitled video game project", for secrecy. Rockstar hired Rod Edge as the full-time director to handle the game's performances, recorded using motion capture technology, with additional dialogue and sound effects recorded in a studio; the performance capture was recorded in Santa Monica, California. Actors wore helmets with cameras to capture their facial expressions. Rob Wiethoff auditioned for the role of protagonist John Marston by folding laundry while reading his lines. He felt the audition was a waste of time, but received the role a few days later. He worked on the game for almost two years, with principal production lasting around six weeks. The first scene to be recorded was John meeting Nigel West Dickens. Recording would take place over a few weeks, before taking a break of a month or two. Wiethoff estimated around 12–15 scenes were recorded each day. The recording crew often referred to scenes from Grand Theft Auto IV during production; Wiethoff pretended to understand before eventually admitting he had not played the game. John was developed to be a nuanced character, as opposed to an explicit villain or hero, and a "family man". Carson said Marston "has a foot in both the old world and the world that was to come", and felt the character became interesting due to the combination of cynicism and realism. Wiethoff felt the early decisions in John's life were a direct result of his need for acceptance and he may not have been aware of his actions. John's physical appearance took "quite a while" for the team to achieve but they felt it allowed them to develop an emotional connection to the character.

Steve J. Palmer, who portrayed Bill Williamson, felt John and Bill represented siblings in their former gang, while Dutch van der Linde was more of a parental figure. He stated Williamson is envious of Marston, despite Marston being his "moral anchor", and after Marston left the gang, Williamson's life began to "tailspin" uncontrollably. Palmer auditioned for the role in December 2008, and was cast the following month. Palmer felt his similarity in appearance to Bill contributed to his casting. Benjamin Byron Davis, who portrayed Dutch and Nastas, recorded his scenes for the game in two week-long sessions several months apart. For his audition, Davis read lines ultimately used for Drew MacFarlane. Davis based Dutch's voice on Osbourne Crawl, a character he had played in a short film. The team told Davis that Dutch was a well-read, charismatic former gang leader who had "lost his mind". The team considered allowing Dutch's fate to be left to the player's choice; Davis felt the decision to avoid this was a demonstration of Dutch always being in control of his own fate. For his role as Nastas, Davis believed he was simply portraying the character's motion capture performance due to his height and the voice work would be re-dubbed; ultimately, his voice was included in the game. When auditioning for Luisa Fortuna, actress Francesca Galeas recalled the role being described as "a Salma Hayek bad ass chick with an accent".

== Technical and gameplay development ==
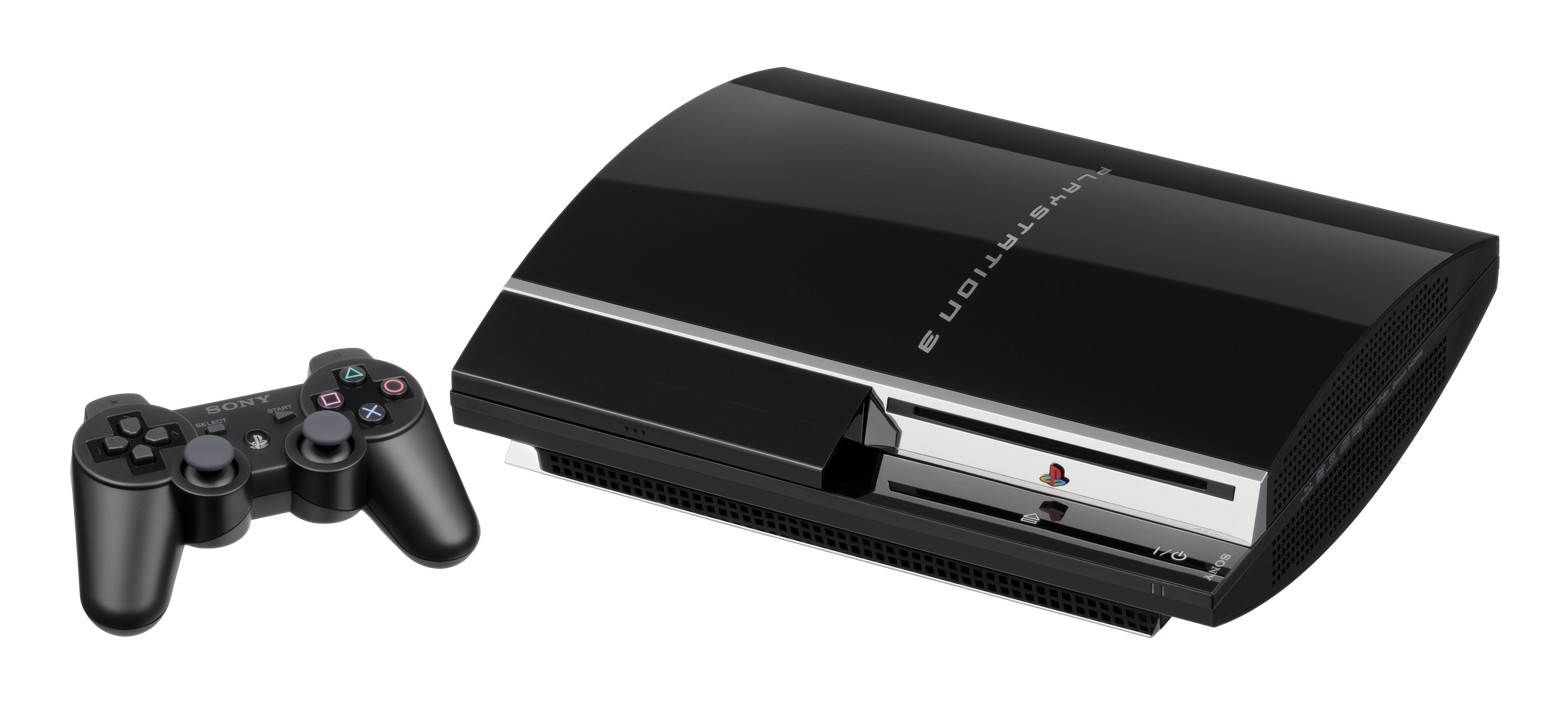
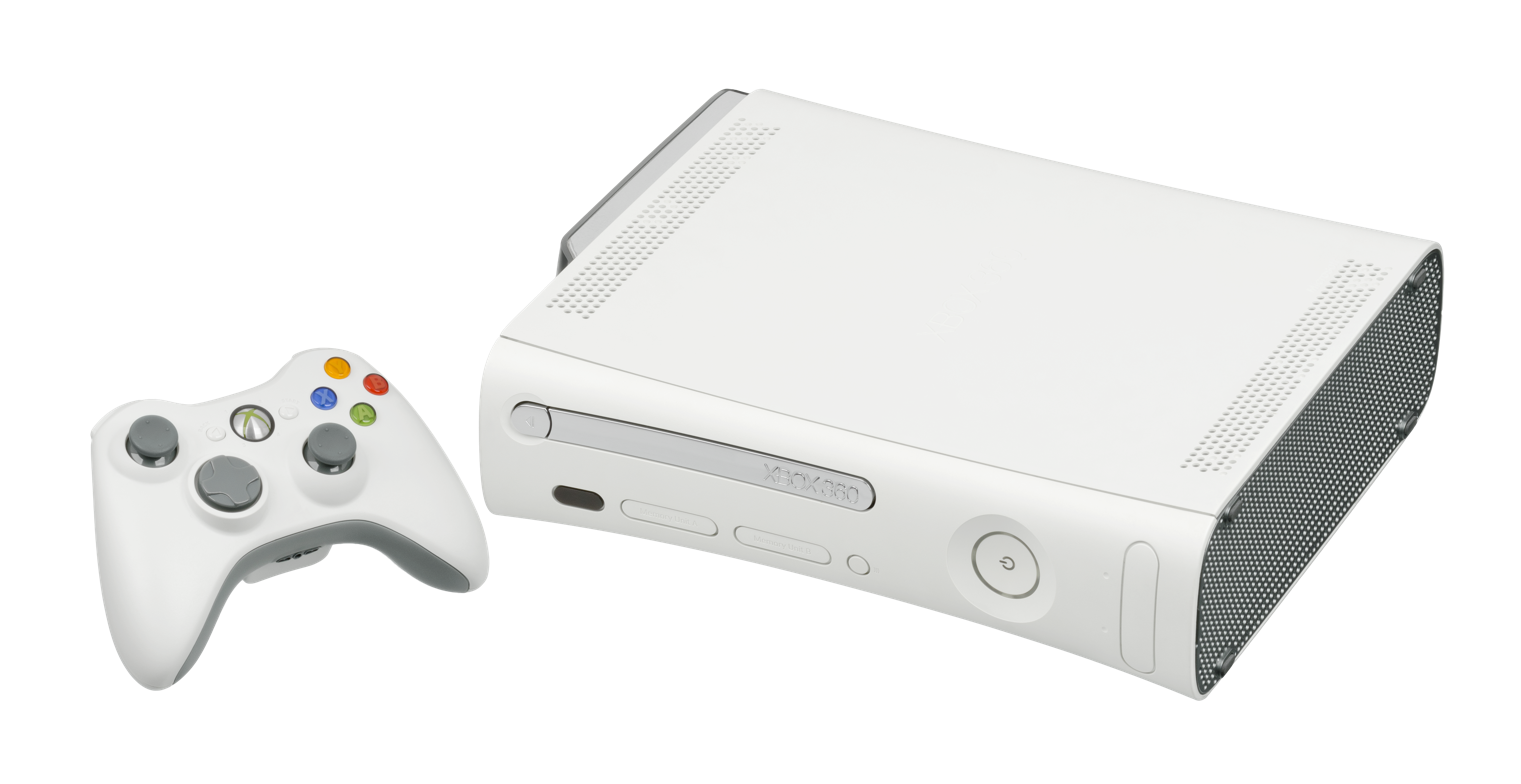
Development of Red Dead Redemption was conducted on the PlayStation 3 (top) and Xbox 360 (bottom) systems simultaneously.

Like other projects since Rockstar Games Presents Table Tennis (2006), the game uses the proprietary Rockstar Advanced Game Engine (RAGE) to perform animation and rendering tasks, and the Euphoria and Bullet engines for further animation and environment rendering tasks. Carson said Euphoria provides "a physically based character performance system" that is "tightly integrated into RAGE's proprietary physics engine". Overhauling the potential processing power of RAGE allowed the game to create a high level of detail, including realistic animations and detailed textures. The potential power of the PlayStation 3 and Xbox 360 experienced through the development kits motivated the team to begin development, and to create a game that could fully render the countryside, which was difficult to achieve on previous hardware; Houser wanted to make "a game that was to the countryside as [Grand Theft Auto] was to the city". He felt that primitive technology of the past had prevented game developers from creating a game that "really did justice" to the Wild West, such as the animation of a lasso. Houser felt previous Western games represented one specific aspect of the period, while Red Dead Redemption attempts to represent all features; he described it as "a complete nightmare" and "a massive headache to make fun and look right".

Though the scope of the open world was initially a large challenge from a technical viewpoint, the team used it to their advantage. The developers at San Diego sought guidance from other Rockstar studios experienced with developing open worlds, particularly Grand Theft Auto developer Rockstar North, namely art director Aaron Garbut and producer Leslie Benzies. Early in development, the team looked at Grand Theft Auto as the inspiration for the level of enjoyment they wanted to achieve; senior ambient designer Ghyan Koehne found the experience daunting, noting while Grand Theft Auto "had fast cars, helicopters, rocket launchers, and radio stations to listen to", Red Dead Redemption "had a guy on his horse and endless hills with close to nothing in the world". In developing the objects and surfaces of the game's world, the team utilized a variety of textures and lighting effects. They encountered difficulty in creating a realistic representation of nature; while locations like cities primarily use straight lines, "nature is all about curves", which is more difficult to make believable. For much of the game's development, the world was largely barren, lacking the road networks, animals, and foliage that would eventually populate it; the team was motivated by an "understanding of what it was all going to become", knowing the atmosphere they were trying to achieve.

The game was envisioned to improve the core mechanics of Red Dead Revolver by scaling it up to the standard of other Rockstar games. The fundamental goal for the game was to maintain the shooting mechanic and expand on other game features; like Revolver, the game's weapons were inspired by real weaponry. Carson explained the team attempted to achieve realism with every feature of the game, including the horses, lassos, animal ecosystem, and the open world. To ensure the horse movements were as realistic as possible, the team motion captured a stunt horse, recording all movement. This created various problems; a gesture used by the stunt rider to communicate with the production team while on the horse was the same command that made the horse rear, while creating the horse's skeletal and muscular systems presented a problem and took several years to overcome. Several gameplay features evolved over time; when the team added flying birds and realized most players would inevitably shoot them, they added gameplay and mechanics to track it, eventually leading to the in-game challenge system.

In the early stages of development, Rockstar decided which elements from Red Dead Revolver could be carried over; beyond the Dead Eye and dueling features, very few other elements remained. While Revolver represented many myths and iconic images of the American frontier, in Redemption the team tried to represent the reality of the time period. They avoided linking the narratives as they felt it would make little sense. The tone of Redemption was aimed to be a combination of the primitive Wild West and early 20th century America; with the latter, America was developing into a modern and contemporary society, which the team tried to portray. In addition, while they felt Revolver was constrained by its level-based structure, the team saw potential in creating a game similar to Rockstar's Grand Theft Auto series, in terms of quality, scope and detail. The game's Honor system—intended to keep in line with "the idea of morality and notoriety" associated with the West—was a further development of concepts previously explored by Rockstar, intended to provide the player with more choice in their play style.

== Music production ==
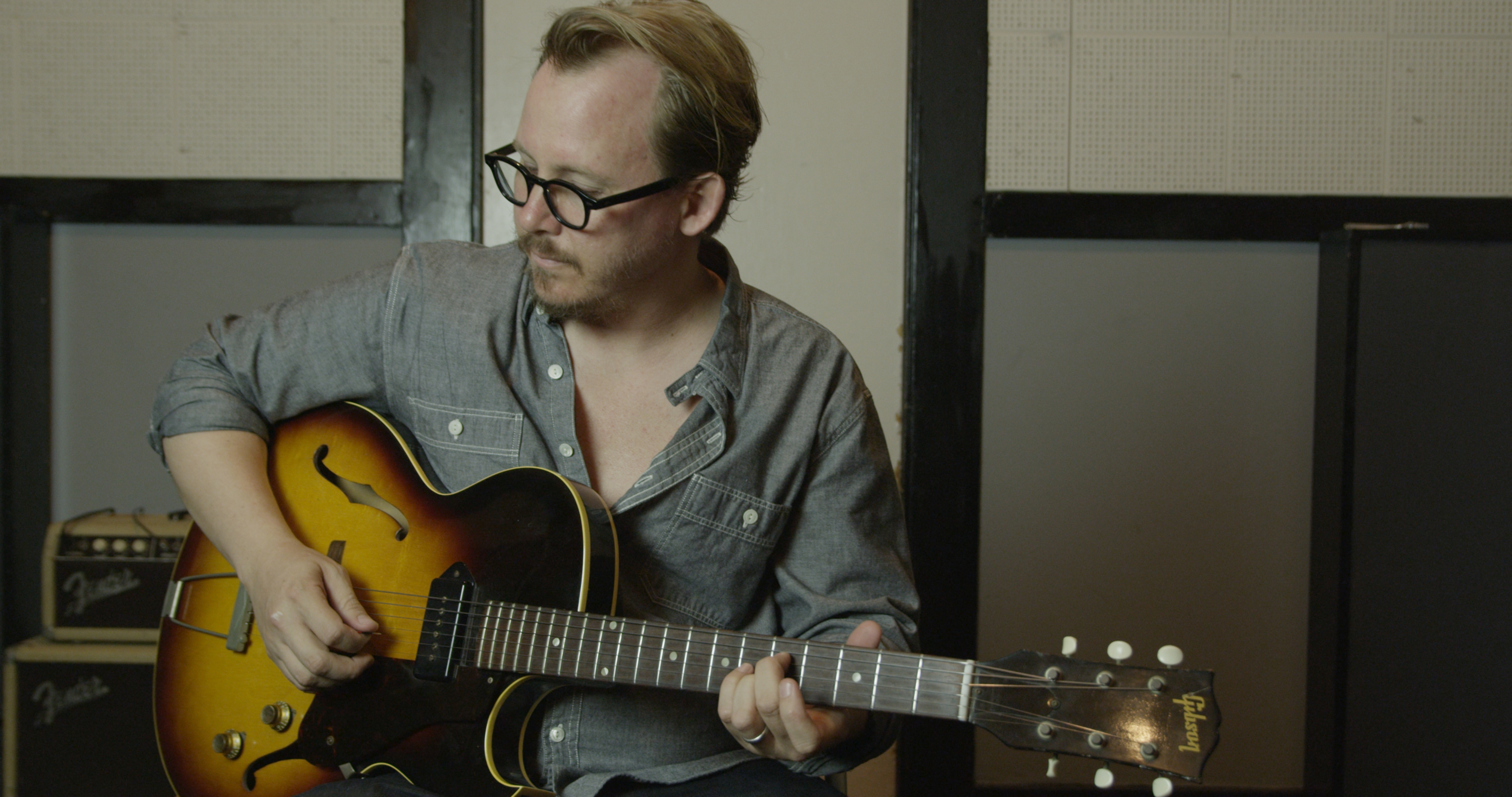
- Woody Jackson composed the score for Red Dead Redemption, in collaboration with Bill Elm.
- "(Theme from) Red Dead Redemption" Jackson wrote the game's main theme shortly after finding a guitar in Los Angeles with "a perfect tremolo".

Red Dead Redemption is one of the first games by Rockstar to use an original score. Music supervisor Ivan Pavlovich cited the large scale of the game as one of the largest difficulties when producing the score; to achieve an effective gaming experience, the game could not solely feature licensed music, like previous Rockstar games. In 2008, Rockstar engaged musicians Bill Elm and Woody Jackson, who collaborated to compose approximately 200 tracks for the game over 15 months. The original score and subsequent album were both recorded and mixed at Jackson's studio, Electro-Vox Recording Studios in Los Angeles, and mastered at Capitol Studios. Jackson worked with David Holmes—with whom he had worked on films like Ocean's Twelve (2004) and Ocean's Thirteen (2007)—to produce the soundtrack. The game features vocal performances by Ashtar Command, José González, Jamie Lidell, and William Elliott Whitmore.

Recorded at 130 beats per minute in A minor, most of songs featured are constructed from stems in the game's dynamic soundtrack. A mix of modern instruments and those featured in traditional Western films, such as the jaw harp, were used. Unique sounds were created through creative uses of instruments, such as playing a trumpet onto the surface of a timpani drum. Rockstar consulted musicians who played traditional Western instruments; harmonica player Tommy Morgan, who had been featured on several films over his 60-year career, provided traditional harmonica segments for the game. Beyond trumpets, nylon guitars and accordions, the composers incorporated other instruments, such as flutes and ocarinas. When researching music for inspiration, Jackson found there was no "Western sound" in 1911; he felt the soundtracks of 1960s Western films, such as Ennio Morricone's work on the Dollars Trilogy, was more representative of Western music. In appropriating the score to the game's setting, Elm commented the process was initially "daunting", taking a long time to discover how the music was to work in an interactive way. Shortly after finding a German guitar in Los Angeles with the appropriate sound and "a perfect tremolo", Jackson returned home and wrote the game's main theme. While experimenting for the game's northern region, Jackson recorded the heartbeat of his preborn daughter using his iPhone.

== Sound design ==
From the beginning of development, the sound development team wished to achieve authenticity in the game's sounds. After the art department sent artwork to the sound department, the latter were inspired to achieve realism, researching all sounds to be used in the game. Throughout development, sound editors often presented ideas, which would then be achieved by the audio programmers. The three main areas of the game world contain unique ambiences; these are broken down into smaller sounds, such as bugs and animals, which are further refined to reflect the weather and time. The sound department was given specific instructions for the tone of game locations; for example, Thieves' Landing was to feel "creepy" and "off-putting". The sounds of the game's weapons were intricately developed; in order to feel as realistic as possible, each weapon has a variety of similar firing sounds. The development of the game's Foley began with a week-long session, where two Foley artists from Los Angeles were sent to record thousands of sounds relating to the game's setting. The sound department spent time on specific gameplay elements; Dead Eye was meant to sound "organic" as opposed to "sci-fi or electronic", while animals—a feature the team found challenging—was to immerse players in the experience. For the final sound mix, audio director Jeffrey Whitcher and lead sound designer Matthew Smith worked together to balance and blend the three main aspects of the soundtrack: dialogue, sound effects, and music. Smith coded systems to blend the three aspects, in order to keep the mix "dynamic".

== Release ==
An early trailer for an untitled Western project by Rockstar Games for PlayStation 3 was shown at Sony's E3 conference in May 2005; it was a technology demonstration of RAGE, and theorized to be a sequel to Red Dead Revolver. Rockstar officially announced Red Dead Redemption on February 3, 2009, with a release date set for late 2009 for PlayStation 3 and Xbox 360. The April 2009 edition of Game Informer noted the game would be released for Windows in addition to consoles, though Rockstar later confirmed it had "no current plans" for a Windows release; according to lead multiplayer designer Kris Roberts, a Windows version was never seriously considered. In May 2009, the game was pushed to a 2010 release. In November 2009, Rockstar confirmed Red Dead Redemption would be released on April 27, 2010, and April 30 internationally. In March 2010, Rockstar announced the game would miss its original projected date, pushed back to May 18 in North America and May 21 internationally, citing the "optimal time frame" for release. The game was released in Japan on October 7, 2010.

Downloadable content (DLC) for the game was released following its launch, with focus on maps and game types suggested by the community. According to Strauss Zelnick, chief executive officer of Rockstar's parent company Take-Two Interactive, the game's DLC releases were an effort to slow used game sales, providing an incentive for players to keep the game after completion. Rockstar wanted to be able to publish DLC relatively quickly after the game's launch, as opposed to the lengthy development required for Grand Theft Auto IV's episodic DLC. Outlaws to the End, released on June 22, 2010, added six cooperative side missions for multiplayer. Legends and Killers was released on August 10, 2010, and added multiplayer characters from Red Dead Revolver, as well as new map locations and a Tomahawk weapon. On September 21, 2010, Liars and Cheats added competitive multiplayer modes, minigames, characters, and a weapon. Hunting and Trading, released on October 12, 2010, added a jackalope to the game's world, and some additional outfits. Undead Nightmare adds a single-player campaign, set in a non-canonical, zombie apocalypse-themed alternate reality with ghost towns and cemeteries full of zombies, wherein John searches for a cure to the zombie outbreak. It was released on October 26, 2010 as DLC and in late November as a standalone expansion pack. Myths and Mavericks released for free on September 13, 2011, adding additional characters and locations to the multiplayer. A Game of the Year Edition containing all downloadable content was released for both PlayStation 3 and Xbox 360 on October 11, 2011, in North America and on October 14, 2011, internationally.

According to industry sources, Rockstar shelved a Red Dead Redemption remaster after the poor reception of Grand Theft Auto: The Trilogy – The Definitive Edition (2021), instead focusing on development of Grand Theft Auto VI. Media speculation restarted in June 2023 after the Game Rating and Administration Committee in South Korea gave Red Dead Redemption a new rating, and in July after updates to Rockstar's website included minor changes to the game's logos and achievements. In August, Rockstar announced Red Dead Redemption and Undead Nightmare's single-player modes would release for the Nintendo Switch and PlayStation 4 on August 17, developed by Double Eleven. Physical versions were released on October 13. Reactions were mixed, with the trailer receiving mostly dislikes on YouTube; some journalists and players appreciated the game becoming available on modern consoles, but lamented the lack of visual and frame rate upgrades, absence of a Windows release, omission of multiplayer, and US$49.99 price point. An update in October added an option to increase the frame rate from 30 to 60 frames-per-second when played on PlayStation 5 via backward compatibility. Speculation regarding a Windows version started in May 2024 after data mining of the Rockstar Games Launcher, and in August following a PlayStation Store update. Rockstar announced the Windows version on October 8, which was released on October 29, with enhancements such as native 4K resolution support, ultrawide monitor compatibility, and DLSS upscaling.

Following premature store and ESRB listings on November 13, 2025, Rockstar announced that Red Dead Redemption would be released for Android and iOS mobile devices on December 2, alongside new releases for the Nintendo Switch 2, PlayStation 5, and Xbox Series X/S. The mobile versions were available through a Netflix Games subscription for a year, and the console versions through the GTA+ Games Library and the PlayStation Plus Catalog. Developed in collaboration with Double Eleven and Cast Iron Games, the console versions support 60 frames-per-second, including up to 4K resolution on PlayStation 5 and Xbox Series X/S, and the Switch 2 version utilizes the Joy-Con 2's optical mouse controls. Owners of the Switch, PlayStation 4, and Xbox One versions can upgrade digitally for free. A physical PlayStation 5 version was released on May 4, 2026.

== Promotion ==
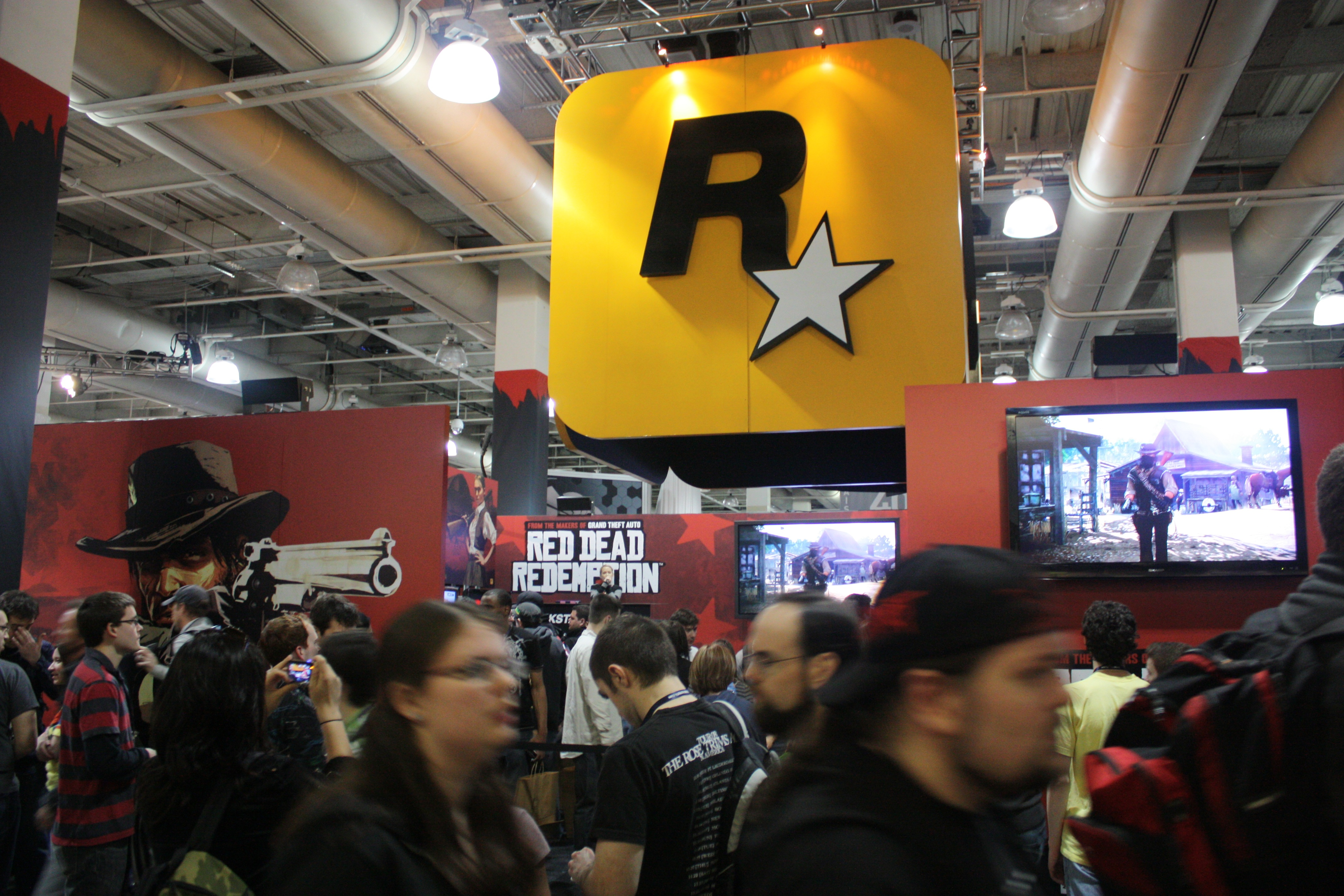
Red Dead Redemption received an extensive marketing campaign, including an exhibition at PAX East in March 2010.

Red Dead Redemption received an extensive and expensive marketing campaign, during which Rockstar partnered with several companies and media outlets, including IGN, GameSpot, LoveFilm, Microsoft, and YouTube. The game's debut trailer was released on May 6, 2009, introducing its concept and world, as well as the first information about its characters. In the week that followed, IGN extensively previewed the game, including gameplay screenshots and interviews with Houser. A trailer titled "My Name is John Marston" was released on December 1, 2009, having leaked the previous week before being pulled from Rockstar; the trailer introduced John Marston and his story, as well as some of the game's supporting characters. Kotaku's Jason Schreier cited the trailer as among the best of the game's generation. The first in a series of gameplay videos was released on December 15, 2009; titled "Introduction", it was the first footage to showcase Red Dead Redemption's gameplay. The second in this series, titled "Weapons & Death", was released on January 28, 2010, demonstrating the game's Dead Eye mechanic and weaponry. A trailer titled "The Law" was released on February 11, 2010, introducing characters Marshal Leigh Johnson and Edgar Ross. This was followed by "The Women: Sinners, Saints & Survivors" on February 24, focusing on the game's female characters, and the third gameplay video, "Life in the West", on March 17, introducing some open world activities. A trio of trailers announcing exclusive pre-order content was released on March 19.

The game's cover art was revealed on March 22, 2010, followed by a video titled "Gentlemen & Vagabonds" on March 24, focusing on some of the male characters of the game, including Seth Briars, Harold MacDougal, and Nigel West Dickens. The game was exhibited at PAX East in late March, with a 15–30 minute playable demonstration. The fourth gameplay video, titled "Life in the West Part II", was released on April 2, further showcasing activities available in the open world. This was followed by two trailers demonstrating the first footage of the game's online multiplayer modes, on April 8 and April 22. From April 27, a GameStop trailer for the game was aired as a television commercial in the United States; Rockstar spent a larger proportion of its budget on television marketing than it had previously. A trailer titled "Revolution" was released on May 6, focusing on the game's Mexican missions and characters. Red Dead Redemption was the focus of the May 8, 2010 episode of GameTrailers TV with Geoff Keighley, featuring new gameplay footage. The final pre-launch trailer was released on May 13, 2010. Rockstar announced trailers would be shown at some cinemas, specifically targeting audiences of films like Iron Man 2, Prince of Persia: The Sands of Time, and Robin Hood (all 2010), and cinema posters would allow consumers to download content from the game through Bluetooth. Rockstar released merchandise for the game after its release in May 2010, including dice, candles, playing cards, and soap, and a vinyl record of the soundtrack in collaboration with Wax Poetics in November. The dice and playing cards were re-released to celebrate the Windows version in October 2024.

Viral marketing strategies were used to market the game. For Movember in November 2009, Rockstar hosted a competition in which it chose the most impressive moustache from a fan, who would be added as a character in the game. The official Red Dead Redemption website was redesigned and updated in the months prior to release with new information. To encourage pre-order sales, Rockstar collaborated with several retail outlets in the United Kingdom and United States—including Amazon, Best Buy, Game, and HMV—to provide pre-order bonuses, including exclusive in-game horses, outfits, and weapons; GameStop hosted a public poll for which outfit would be included with its exclusive pre-order edition. All pre-order content later became available for purchase in April 2011. Rockstar released a special edition of the game in special packaging, with a copy of the soundtrack. Rockstar partnered with LoveFilm for the game's marketing push, with a run of 300,000 branded envelopes and newsletters; the LoveFilm Player allowed all users to watch The Proposition for free. Pieces of artwork from the game was painted on a mural in New York City in February 2010, and depicted on NASCAR driver Joey Logano's GameStop car in April and June 2010. On April 12, Rockstar released Red Dead Redemption: Gunslingers in open beta as a Facebook application: a role-playing social game that allowed players to duel their friends. The game was no longer playable by 2012, as updates to the Facebook platform required a full re-coding.

A machinima short film, titled Red Dead Redemption: The Man from Blackwater, aired in the United States on the television network Fox on May 29, 2010, and in the United Kingdom on Five USA on June 5; IGN released the exclusive extended cut online on June 7. The 30-minute film, retelling several of the game's earlier missions in which John attempts to find Bill, was directed by John Hillcoat, whose film The Proposition had inspired the developers. Hillcoat's music video company was contracted to produce a three-minute trailer for the company; after Hillcoat looked at the material, it eventually expanded into a half-hour film. The production team were granted tools allowing them to reframe shots in the game world, and manipulate the lighting, weather, and time of day; they were able to reframe pre-existing cutscenes. They were limited in their ability to show too many characters to avoid spoiling the story, choosing to focus on the introduction of John, as well as some of the "flamboyant characters" in the early story. Some of the game's actors reprised their roles in bridging scenes for smoother transitions, including Palmer as Bill Williamson. The film was well-received as an introduction of the story for the uninitiated, but described as useless for those familiar with the game.
