= Josh Blaylock =

American actor (born 1990)

- Born: March 29, 1990 (age 36); Plano, Texas, U.S.
- Occupations: Actor, voice actor, photographer
- Years active: 2004–present
- Spouses: Johanna Braddy (m. 2012; div. 2014/15); Caitlin Blaylock (m. 2017)
- Children: 2

Josh Blaylock (born March 29, 1990) is an American actor and professional photographer. Blaylock is best known for his role as BrianD in the web series Video Game High School from 2012 to 2014. He has also appeared in The Bernie Mac Show, No Country for Old Men, and Warehouse 13. Blaylock is also the voice actor of Jack Marston, son of John Marston, in the 2010 video game Red Dead Redemption.

== Personal life ==
Blaylock grew up in Lucas, Texas, before moving to Los Angeles, California, in 2008 to pursue acting. In addition to acting, Blaylock is a photographer. During the production of Video Game High School he was featured in an issue of Allen Image, a community magazine for Collin County, Texas.

In November 2012, Blaylock married VGHS co-star Johanna Braddy; the two met when they were both auditioning for their roles. After two years of marriage, the couple divorced sometime between late 2014 to early 2015.

Blaylock married Caitlin Blaylock in 2017. In February 2019, Blaylock announced the birth of their son on Instagram, followed by a second son in March 2021.

== Filmography ==
=== Video game ===
Year	Title	Role
2010	Red Dead Redemption	Jack Marston
2010	Undead Nightmare	Jack Marston

=== Web ===
Year	Title	Role	Notes
2012	Conan Intern Diaries	Henrik	3 episodes
2012–2014	Video Game High School	Brian Doheny	Main role
2015	Spider	Josh	Short film
2016	RocketJump: The Show	Bartender	Episode: "Tip Jar"

=== Television ===
Year	Title	Role	Notes
2005–2006	The Bernie Mac Show	Todd	3 episodes
2008	Numbers	Mario	Episode: "Frienemies"
2009	Bones	Leo	Episode: "Fire in the Ice"
2009	American Experience	Young John Ross	Episode: "We Shall Remain: Part III - Trail of Tears" (TV series documentary)
2013	Warehouse 13	Nick Powell	4 episodes
2014	The Realms of Labyrinth	Tea Guest	Episode: "The Finer Things"
2017	The Long Road Home	Packwood	8 episodes

=== Film ===
Year	Title	Role	Notes
2004	Crossing the Trinity		Short film
2006	Not Like Everyone Else	Noah Taylor	TV movie
2007	No Country for Old Men	Boy on Bike	
2009	Love at First Hiccup	Guy	
2010	Shit Year	Not Marcus	
2011	Carnal Innocence	Cy Hatinger	TV movie
2011	Firelight	Kieron	Short film
2012	16-Love	Redbull	
2012	VGHS: The Movie	Brian Doheny	Main role
2013	Dean Slater: Resident Advisor	Douche	
