= Red Dead Online =

2019 video game

- Developer: Rockstar Games
- Publisher: Rockstar Games
- Producer: Rob Nelson
- Designer: Imran Sarwar
- Programmer: Phil Hooker
- Artist: Aaron Garbut
- Writers: Dan Houser; Rupert Humphries; Michael Unsworth
- Series: Red Dead
- Engine: RAGE
- Platforms: PlayStation 4; Xbox One; Windows; Stadia
- Release: PlayStation 4, Xbox One; May 14, 2019 (Note: The beta release for Red Dead Online was staggered depending on when players first played Red Dead Redemption 2: November 27, 2018: Ultimate Edition owners; November 28, 2018: first played on October 26; November 29, 2018: first played on October 27–29; November 30, 2018: all players; The beta ended on May 14, 2019.); Windows; November 5, 2019; Stadia; November 19, 2019
- Genre: Action-adventure
- Mode: Multiplayer

Red Dead Online is a 2019 action-adventure game developed and published by Rockstar Games as the online component of Red Dead Redemption 2. After several months in beta, it was released for the PlayStation 4 and Xbox One in May 2019, and for Windows and Stadia in November 2019. A standalone client for the game was released in December 2020. In Red Dead Online, players control a customizable silent protagonist who is freed from prison after being framed for murder, and tasked with taking revenge in exchange for proving their innocence. Set in 1898, one year before the events of Red Dead Redemption 2, the game comprises story missions where up to four players can complete tasks to advance the narrative, as well as various side missions and events.

Like the single-player game, Red Dead Online is presented through both first- and third-person perspectives, and players may freely roam its open world. Gameplay elements include shootouts, hunting, horseback riding, interacting with non-player characters, and maintaining the character's honor rating through moral choices and deeds. A bounty system governs the response of law enforcement and bounty hunters to crimes committed by players. Players traverse the open world alone or in a posse of up to seven players, with or against whom they can partake in organized activities. Developed in tandem with the single-player game, Red Dead Online was viewed as a separate product despite the development team's wishes to translate the single-player's elements to a multiplayer environment. They took lessons learned from Red Dead Redemption's multiplayer mode and Grand Theft Auto Online.

Red Dead Online was praised for its mission presentation, co-operative events, and technical improvements, though it received criticism at launch for the balancing of gameplay and in-game currency, which later updates addressed. Like Grand Theft Auto Online, the game received updates adding new content, including selectable roles to earn additional rewards. Reception to post-release content was generally positive, with praise directed at more significant additions, though the lack of new content over time led to some criticism and backlash. Rockstar withdrew development resources by 2022 to focus on the development of Grand Theft Auto VI.

== Gameplay ==
Players can use camps, either individually or as part of a posse, to rest, access their wardrobe, craft, cook, and fast-travel.

Red Dead Online is the multiplayer component of the 2018 video game Red Dead Redemption 2. Played from a first- or third-person perspective, the game is set in an open-world environment featuring a fictionalized version of the United States. Player progression in the single-player story does not affect Online. Upon entering the game world, players customize a character and are free to explore the environment alone or in a "posse" group. Players can participate in organized activities with or against members of their posse, or against other groups. As players complete activities throughout the game world, they receive experience points to raise their characters in rank and receive bonuses, thereby progressing in the game. Camps can be temporarily set up throughout the world, either for an individual player or a posse, where players can rest, access their wardrobe, craft, cook, and fast-travel.

Horses are the main forms of transportation, of which there are various breeds, each with different attributes. Players must either train or tame a wild horse to use it. Increased use of a horse will begin a bonding process, which can be increased by cleaning and feeding it, and the player will acquire advantages as they ride their horse. Players must insure their horse so it heals over time and can respawn. Up to four players can join a temporary, ad hoc posse group for the duration of a game session. Alternatively, for a fee, up to seven players can join a persistent posse that regenerates when its leader comes online. Within a persistent posse, players can customize the group's style and track player stats. Friendly fire can be disabled so teammates do not injure each other. If two players continue to kill each other, the game presents two optional modes: parley, in which the players cannot interact with each other for a short period of time; and feud, where the two players partake in a three-minute shootout.

Dispersed throughout the game world are story missions in which four players complete tasks to advance the game's narrative. The game world also features events in which up to 32 players can partake individually or with a posse group. Event types include a deathmatch mode devoid of firearms and a race mode by horseback. Players are notified when a competitive event begins somewhere in the game world and are given the option to immediately travel to the event. Alternatively, players can join specific events at will. Outside events, non-player character ("strangers") in the game world offer missions, such as contract killings or camp raidings. Red Dead Online uses the Honor system from the single-player story, measuring how the player's actions are perceived in terms of morality. Morally positive choices and deeds like helping strangers and abiding the law will add up to the player's Honor, while negative deeds such as theft and harming innocents will subtract from the player's Honor. Most story missions impact Honor, and some can only be initiated if the player's Honor is at a particular level.

Red Dead Online adds several new systems atop the single-player mode's gameplay. In addition to in-game cash, which can be used for supplies, Online adds gold, a second in-game currency used to purchase luxury and special items, and tokens, which are earned by unlocking role ranks and can be used to purchase role-specific items. Players acquire gold nuggets by completing challenges and can convert 100 nuggets into gold bars. Rather than having to travel to a town's store, online player characters can order supplies anywhere from a handheld catalog. The orders become available for pickup in any town's post office or the player's camp. Online introduces "ability cards", in which players can activate one active and three passive powers for their characters. Players receive these cards by rising in rank or direct purchase, and can then upgrade the cards with in-game currency and experience points.

== Synopsis ==
=== A Land of Opportunity ===
The narrative takes place in 1898, one year before the events of Red Dead Redemption 2. The player takes on the role of a silent protagonist who is arrested for murder and imprisoned in Sisika Penitentiary. Six months into their sentence and awaiting execution, their prison transport is held up by a band of hired guns. The group's leader, Horley (Larry Bull), escorts the player to his employer, the widow Jessica LeClerk (Lisa Datz), who reveals the player was unfairly accused of murdering her husband Philip, who she suspects was actually killed by his business partners: banker Jeremiah Shaw, landowners Amos and Grace Lancing, and Grace's brother, outlaw Teddy Brown (Daniel Stewart Sherman). Jessica enlists the player's help to avenge Philip's death in exchange for proving their innocence, and allows them to leave.

After the player is provided with a camp and some work, they meet with Horley in Blackwater; he advises them to work with the local sheriffs and earn some money while he investigates Philip's murder. Eventually, Horley tells the player to seek work with either U.S. Marshal Tom Davies (Mike Keller) or mercenary Samson Finch (Julian Rozzell Jr.), depending on the player's honor level. If the player has high honor, Davies enlists the player's posse to join the hunt for Mexican bandit Alfredo Montez (Emilio Delgado); with low honor, Finch has the player's posse prove themselves for an upcoming job by helping him rob a factory during a labor strike and exact revenge on his former partner, who is protected by a corrupt garrison.

After either series of events, the player's posse meets with Horley and Jessica to help them kill Teddy Brown, who is hiding out with his gang near the abandoned Fort Mercer. With the assistance of the local authorities, the player's posse besieges the fort and eliminates Brown's men before capturing Brown himself, who is swiftly killed by Jessica. The player then continues working for either Davies or Finch, helping the former deal with retribution from Montez's gang, or assisting the latter with a bank robbery in Saint Denis.

Meanwhile, Amos and Shaw try to finalize their takeover of Philip's business by coercing Jessica into signing a forged contract. Accompanied by Horley and the player's posse, Jessica meets the two men and their bodyguards in Blackwater. When Amos denies any involvement in Philip's death, an enraged Jessica shoots him dead with a pistol hidden in her purse. The player's posse retrieves the contract from Shaw, and escorts Jessica and Horley out of Blackwater. With only Grace left to be dealt with in order to avenge Philip, Jessica vows to do so one day, and laments that her vendetta has led to both her and Horley becoming fugitives. She then thanks the player's posse for their help and informs them that the evidence clearing their name will be delivered, before leaving with Horley to go into hiding.

=== A Life of 'Shine ===
A Life of 'Shine is a story chapter added in December 2019. The player character is introduced to "Lightning" Maggie Fike (Stephanie Roth Haberle), who once controlled the moonshine trade in Lemoyne but disappeared after falling afoul of revenue agents led by the ruthless Reid Hixon. Maggie convinces the player to finance her new operation and help her take revenge on Hixon. The player rescues Maggie's nephew Lem (Jordan Bondurant) from the revenuers, drawing the attention of the Braithwaite family, who have turned to moonshining and recruited Maggie's former cook Danny-Lee Caton to oversee production. The Braithwaites threaten retaliation after the player sabotages their moonshining operation, while Hixon learns about Maggie's revived business and ambushes the player and Lem on a job. To deal with both of their enemies simultaneously, Maggie arranges a supposed peace meeting with the Braithwaites and anonymously tips off Hixon. At the meeting, Hixon arrests the player, Lem, and Danny-Lee, but they manage to escape after Lem detonates an improvised bomb using the moonshine in his wagon. With Lem's help, the player kills Hixon and captures Danny-Lee, bringing the latter back to Maggie, who allows him to leave on the condition he vanish forever. The player then returns to producing moonshine with Maggie and Lem.

== Development ==
Red Dead Online was developed by Rockstar Games in tandem with the single-player story; the development team considered both single-player and multiplayer while creating the world but focused on the former. Though Red Dead Online and Red Dead Redemption 2 share assets and gameplay, Rockstar views them as separate products with independent trajectories, reflected in its decision to launch the multiplayer title separately. The development team took lessons learned from the multiplayer of Red Dead Redemption (2010) and applied those with the best elements of Grand Theft Auto Online (2013), particularly in regards to introducing narrative elements to a multiplayer title. The team sought to translate elements of the single-player story to Red Dead Online, overhauling them for an online space. Producer Rob Nelson felt, while the team's experience on Grand Theft Auto Online helped with the foundations of Red Dead Online, the differences in direction, pace, and scale demanded a different overall approach, slowly leading the player into the world with smaller steps instead of the fast pace of Grand Theft Auto Online.

Red Dead Online's public beta opened for the PlayStation 4 and Xbox One on November 27, 2018, to players who owned a special edition of the base game, and then progressively opened to all owners. The progressive release was a choice by Rockstar to mitigate any major performance issues by the influx of players. Rockstar added and adapted several modes during the beta stage, and made changes to the balance and economy. Player progression in the public beta carried over when the beta ended on May 14, 2019. Alongside the base game, Red Dead Online became available for Windows on November 5, 2019, and for Stadia on November 19.

Red Dead Online implements microtransactions by letting players purchase gold bars for in-game items such as weapons and cosmetics. Rockstar had adopted a similar approach for Grand Theft Auto Online. Rockstar donated five percent of in-game revenue generated in Red Dead Online and Grand Theft Auto Online in April and May 2020 to relief efforts of the COVID-19 pandemic. Each of its nine worldwide studios donated to local charities. Rockstar closed the game for two hours on June 4, 2020, to honor the memorial of George Floyd. A standalone client for Red Dead Online, which does not require Red Dead Redemption 2, was released on December 1, 2020, for PlayStation 4, Windows, and Xbox One. Upon Stadia's shutdown in January 2023, Rockstar allowed players to transfer their progress to other platforms.

=== Additional content ===
Release timeline
2019	Frontier Pursuits
2019	Moonshiners
2020	The Naturalist
2020	Bounty Hunters
2021	Blood Money
2022–2024
2025	Strange Tales of the West

Post-release content was added to Red Dead Online through free title updates. Rockstar planned to evolve the world over time, including expanding the player's in-game businesses from a small camp to a larger company. Rockstar intended to add more role-playing elements to Red Dead Online over time, including additional roles and missions. One of the team's greater challenges was the addition of experiences that allow player freedom without too much structure. The first update to the game world was in December 2018, wherein saloons played Christmas music. To coincide with the full release in May 2019, Rockstar released an update that added new story missions, dynamic events, free roam activities, and poker.

The Frontier Pursuits update, released on September 10, 2019, implemented three new roles: bounty hunter, where players earn rewards by tracking down targets; trader, where players collect and sell items to expand their camp into a business; and collector, focused on discovering collectibles using items such as a metal detector and binoculars. The development team implemented roles as a result of frequent player requests for a stronger connection to their character, providing high-stakes action for bounty hunting or slower exploration as a collector; Nelson noted the team enjoyed the immersion of Rockstar's open worlds and wanted to extrapolate that feeling for personalized characters. The trajectory of the roles is intentionally slower than Grand Theft Auto Online's missions, with each role originally set to have logical successors gradually advancing players' financial success. The update added an Outlaw Pass, which grants players access to additional rewards for an in-game price, and a limited promotion named the Wheeler, Rawson & Co Club, where players could unlock specific rewards as they gained experience. With each of the roles, players are assigned special tasks for a limited time, such as Legendary Bounties for bounty hunters and specific items for collectors. Fear of the Dark, a limited event for Showdown Mode, was added for Halloween in October and November, dividing players into Hunters and Night Stalkers. The Moonshiners update, added on December 13, 2019, introduced moonshiner as an extension to the trader role, focusing on producing, managing, and distributing moonshine. The update included additional content, such as the first purchasable property and a new Outlaw Pass. To celebrate Christmas in December 2019, Rockstar granted free supplies to players and added a temporary period of snowfall.

The Naturalist, released on July 28, 2020, added a fifth role, revolving around players tracking down animals to study or hunt them. The update added new clothing, animals, and an Outlaw Pass. The team enjoyed the single-player's animal hunting mechanics and felt it could be effectively imitated in Red Dead Online. The naturalist's Vitalism Studies feature, allowing players to temporarily assume control of an animal, was viewed as an experience that "bend[s] reality" in contrast to the otherwise grounded tone. For Halloween in October 2020, Rockstar added a new mode, Dead of Night, wherein players fight against zombies. The Halloween Pass, which was available from October 20 to November 16, added several Halloween-themed reward, including horse masks, emotes, and weapon variations. The team felt the events reflected some of the mysteries present in single-player. The Bounty Hunters update was released simultaneously with the standalone client in December 2020, adding new ranks to the bounty hunter role and three additional targets to track down, as well as a new Outlaw Pass and bonus items. Snowfall returned for Christmas 2020, alongside an additional weapon and gun variant. Three solo missions were added on February 16, 2021; Rockstar intended to add more in the future. Eight horse races were added on May 25, 2021.

Following some teases, Rockstar announced Blood Money with a trailer in early July 2021 prior to its July 13 release. It added missions about the criminal underworld, with players helping Guido Martelli create his own network in Saint Denis. The developers had wanted more criminal experiences. Martelli, referenced in single-player, was added to gain consistency between the two modes. The update added the ability to rob homesteads and camps. In missions and free roam, players can find Capitale, a valuable commodity which Martelli exchanges for opportunities; the developers added these to introduce complex missions wherein players find new completion strategies. Released alongside Blood Money was the Quick Draw Club, four passes providing players with gameplay rewards and bonuses; the first was Dutch van der Linde's outfit. Purchasing all passes granted access to the Halloween Pass 2. A character added in Blood Money, guitar player "Bluewater" John, is portrayed by musician Christone "Kingfish" Ingram; an original song co-written by Ingram, "Letter from Bluewater Man", was released on August 20. A new mode, All Hallows' Call to Arms, was added for Halloween in October 2021, allowing players to defend four locations from wild animals and supernatural elements like a ghost train, alongside the return of Dead of Night and the addition of the Halloween Pass 2, which included 15 ranks granting Halloween-themed rewards. Snowfall, music, and decorations returned for Christmas in December 2021 alongside new holiday-themed maps.

In July 2022, Rockstar announced Red Dead Online would not be receiving any more major updates, instead focusing on smaller missions and the expansion of existing modes as development resources were withdrawn to focus on Grand Theft Auto VI. Three new Hardcore Telegram missions were added in an update on September 6, 2022, followed by another on October 18. Previous Halloween content—All Hallows' Call to Arms, Dead of Night, Fear of the Dark, and the Halloween Pass 2—returned in October, bonuses were provided to celebrate Thanksgiving in November, and Christmas music, decorations, and snowfall returned in December. All three returned from October to December in 2023 and 2024, the latter alongside three new Bodyguard Telegram missions for Halloween. In July 2025, Rockstar released Strange Tales of the West Vol. 1, adding four Telegram missions in which author Theodore Levin contacts the player about new phenomena in the world, including robots, a swamp monster, and zombie-like creatures. The Halloween, Thanksgiving, and Christmas content returned from October to December 2025.

== Reception ==
Red Dead Online received criticism at launch for its in-game currency rewards for activities, with players complaining they were too low for the cost of goods and upgrades. Some players calculated a single gold bar could take an estimated eight hours to earn in the game. Rockstar agreed to re-balance the game's economy following complaints. Similar complaints emerged about the griefing taking place in the game; Rockstar fixed these issues by making player visibility dependent on their proximity and behavior. The Verge reported several users who played as black characters had been targeted by griefers posing as Ku Klux Klan-inspired clans or slave catchers who often called them racial slurs.

GameStar's Christian Just felt Red Dead Online carried most of the strengths of the single-player, effectively fulfilling his childhood fantasy of cowboy life. VG247's Matt Martin criticized some balancing issues but attributed them to the beta status, overall finding the game more enjoyable than Grand Theft Auto Online from both a technical and gameplay perspective. The Verge's Andrew Webster found Red Dead Online's battle royale mode more tense than games like Fortnite due to the smaller player count and slower playstyle. Official Xbox Magazine (OXM) named King of the Castle the best game mode. Kotaku's Heather Alexandra considered Red Dead Online "gamier" than its single-player counterpart, specifically in seeing the realistic towns transformed into deathmatch levels. IGN's Luke Reilly praised the co-operative story missions but noted the player versus player modes often had a skill imbalance. Den of Geek's John Saavedra criticized the simplistic story missions and found the free roam missions a better way to "break up the monotony" of traversing the world.

Rockstar's parent company Take-Two Interactive reported the game hit peak players in December 2019 following the release of the Moonshiners update; this was surpassed in December 2020, which saw more new and returning players since the game's beta launch. From June 2024 to March 2026, according to leaked internal data, Red Dead Online generated an average weekly revenue of US$507,193 (with a low of $316,112 and high of $868,069), equating around $26.4 million per year; of its 969 thousand active weekly players (between 704 thousand and 1.29 million), around 15 thousand were paid users. Journalists and players noted these figures were significantly higher than several competitor games but justified Rockstar's abandonment of Red Dead Online in favor of Grand Theft Auto Online, which was more than ten times more successful (approximately 9.9 million players and $9.5 million per week). Take-Two's chief executive officer, Strauss Zelnick, rejected the idea that Red Dead Online was a "missed opportunity", citing its ongoing success, and felt such a suggestion was only made in comparison to Grand Theft Auto Online.

=== Post-release reception ===
Red Dead Online was nominated for Online Game of the Year at the 22nd Annual D.I.C.E. Awards and Best Multiplayer Game at the 2019 Golden Joystick Awards. By March 2019, PlayStation Official Magazine – UK's Dave Meikleham felt Red Dead Online was "off to a promising start" despite imbalanced deathmatches, and OXM's Chris Burke yearned for more solo missions. Eurogamer's Jordan Oloman appreciated the improvements made by May, praising the story missions, but felt players needed more purpose within the world. After September's Frontier Pursuits update, Oloman found the game enjoyable enough to play instead of returning to single-player. Polygon's Cass Marshall thought the update made the game fun to play with friends. Eurogamer's Oloman considered the December Moonshiners update the best to date, and found the new characters compelling. Kotaku's Zack Zwiezen echoed this sentiment, praising the amount of content available. In January 2020, Edge identified significant glitches had become a deterrent for new players but wrote "when it works, the game provides an absorbing RPG experience in a stunning sandbox".

In May 2020, the game was used by workers to conduct online business meetings instead of Skype or Zoom; the immersion of the world was cited as an appealing feature, though the technical issues and lengthy tutorial were criticized for new employees. Several players reported to playing as a refuge during COVID-19 lockdowns; the Rift Trails, a group of equestrians who hosted daily rides through the world, grew to over 2,500 members by 2022. In July 2020, several players dressed their characters as clowns to demonstrate their displeasure at the game's lack of updates. Kotaku's Zwiezen considered The Naturalist update "a step back" from Moonshiners, but found it made him appreciate the nature and details. Polygon's Marshall called the update "perfectly fine" but noted it failed to make the game "feel meaningfully different" like the varied Grand Theft Auto Online updates. Writing for NME, Oloman felt the update contradicted the "ruthless" nature of the game and the tasks had become repetitive. PC Gamer's Christopher Livingston described it as "surprisingly disappointing", citing its similarity to the trader role. Following a patch released in August 2020, several players reported significant, game-breaking glitches; in response, Rockstar reverted the game to a previous version.

Kotaku's Zwiezen considered the October 2020 Halloween update "disappointing" due to the lack of memorable or significant content. He criticized the December update, perceiving Rockstar's favoritism to Grand Theft Auto Online. The update received similar criticism from several players, who felt it was lacking in content and rewards. Conversely, Zwiezen considered the February 2021 solo missions to be an improvement as it alleviated concerns of dealing with other players. In March, Alex Avard of GamesRadar+ wrote Red Dead Online could "reach its true potential" if it continued to build upon the momentum of the previous year, though noted the monetization system remained unbalanced. In July, Polygon's Marshall felt Blood Money was suitable for regular players but found the lack of regular updates "frustrating" due to the game's potential. Screen Rant's Rion Duncan felt Blood Money were too similar to stranger missions, criticizing the lack of preparatory gameplay for the heists as seen in Grand Theft Auto Online. Digital Trends's Otto Kratky praised Blood Money and wrote, unlike with previous updates, Rockstar was "finally appealing to those Old West clichés" and setting the game in the right direction.

=== Final updates ===
In December 2021, PC Gamer's Lauren Morton expressed disappointment at the lack of activity compared to Rockstar's other projects, though noted it "remains as expansive and gorgeous as ever". The January 2022 update—bonus rewards for existing missions—led to some backlash from players as they considered it "low effort" and described the game as "dead" due to the lack of new content; it was compared to Grand Theft Auto Online, which received major updates throughout 2021, while Red Dead Online's most recent Blood Money update was considered lackluster in comparison. An online fan campaign ensued; the hashtag #SaveRedDeadOnline trended on Twitter, with over 18,000 tweets. When a new Grand Theft Auto Online mode was released without an announcement, Kotaku's Zwiezen partly attributed Rockstar's silence to the campaign. Rockstar's social media posts were met with responses regarding the campaign, and some employees were spammed with abuse.

In May, Zelnick said the companies had "heard the frustration". On July 13, 2022, players hosted in-game funerals to mark one year since the last major update and to mourn Rockstar's withdrawal of development resources; players met at in-game graveyards and cemeteries to capture photographs and drink alcohol. TheGamer's Stacey Henley was disappointed by Rockstar's decision but found it inevitable as the game was "forced to live in the shadow" of Grand Theft Auto Online; she felt it was "never going to be" good and concluded "real closure ... is all we can ask for". Rock Paper Shotgun's Mark Warren thought it demonstrated that imitating Grand Theft Auto Online did not guarantee success. Players and community members criticized Rockstar for its false promises and missed opportunities despite the game's success relative to non-Rockstar games, and many remained committed to continuing their activities despite the lack of major updates.
