= Undead Nightmare =

2010 expansion pack for Red Dead Redemption

Red Dead Redemption: Undead Nightmare
- Developer: Rockstar San Diego (Note: Nintendo Switch, PlayStation 4, and Windows versions developed by Double Eleven, who developed the Nintendo Switch 2, PlayStation 5, and Xbox Series X/S versions with Cast Iron Games)
- Publisher: Rockstar Games
- Composers: Bill Elm; Woody Jackson
- Series: Red Dead
- Engine: RAGE
- Platforms: PlayStation 3 Xbox 360: Nintendo Switch; PlayStation 4; Windows; Android; iOS; Nintendo Switch 2; PlayStation 5; Xbox Series X/S
- Release: October 26, 2010: PlayStation 3, Xbox 360; October 26, 2010; Switch, PlayStation 4; August 17, 2023; Windows; October 29, 2024; Android, iOS, Switch 2, PS5, Xbox Series X/S; December 2, 2025
- Genre: Action-adventure
- Modes: Single-player, multiplayer

Red Dead Redemption: Undead Nightmare is a 2010 action-adventure game developed by Rockstar San Diego and published by Rockstar Games. A standalone expansion pack for the open world Western game Red Dead Redemption, it adds a non-canonical, horror–themed single-player campaign, two multiplayer modes, and cosmetic additions to the environments and characters. Set in an alternate timeline from the base game's story, the plot follows returning protagonist John Marston, a former outlaw who sets out to find the cause of and possible cure for a zombie plague that has infected his wife and son. Marston liberates towns overrun by the undead and assists non-playable characters with side quests.

Rockstar Games had a long-standing interest in creating a zombie game. They found the Red Dead Redemption universe and its American countryside to fit the cinematic heritage of the horror film genre. Rockstar wanted their additional content to function outside rather than within the base game's story, but draw on its characters and atmosphere. The company released Undead Nightmare as downloadable content for PlayStation 3 and Xbox 360 platforms on October 26, 2010, and as a retail disc bundle with other downloadable content packs in late November. It was released for Nintendo Switch and PlayStation 4 alongside the main game in August 2023, for Windows in October 2024, and for Android, iOS, Nintendo Switch 2, PlayStation 5, and Xbox Series X/S in December 2025.

Undead Nightmare received generally favorable reviews at its release, and the retail disc sold two million copies by 2011. It was praised as a model for downloadable content and named among the best of the year, with top awards from the 2010 Spike Video Game Awards and Shacknews in this category. Critics praised its production values and handling of the zombie video game motif, and noted its lightheartedness compared to the main game, although some reviewers struggled with the game's character movement controls and found the combat unvaried. It is retrospectively considered to be among the best downloadable content packs ever made.

== Gameplay ==
Undead Nightmare is a modified expansion of the 2010 video game Red Dead Redemption, an open world Western action-adventure in which the former outlaw John Marston is coerced by the federal government to capture former members of his gang in exchange for his family's freedom. Undead Nightmare is an alternate timeline expansion that adds a new full-length story in a zombie horror theme and reworks the base game's environment to appear dark and spooky. As corpses begin to rise from the dead to become flesh-eating zombies, some of the living go into hiding and others become hostile. John seeks to find the plague's cause and its cure for his infected wife, Abigail, and their infected son, Jack. The game's story lasts about six hours and includes new cutscenes, performances, and music. It is accessed separately from the main game menu with its own save files. It does not share play progress and items from the main game, nor does it require the base game in any form.

As in Red Dead Redemption, the player can diverge from the main story on side quests: requests from strangers, checklist challenges, and other digressions. These missions are similar in format to those of the original game, but their objectives are replaced to fit the zombie horror theme. For example, the player hunts for the missing family members of survivors instead of fugitives, and empties graveyards instead of gang hideouts. John is called to liberate towns overrun by the undead, which unlocks ammo, new places to stay, quests, and the assistance of the living townspeople. After John's assistance, the towns remain free of zombies for several in-game days, but will eventually require the player's assistance when zombies return once again. The player decides whether to share ammunition with the townsfolk; ammunition serves as a currency in the game since the shops have closed. The player has fewer correctives for immorality, such as helping or killing other survivors, given the dire circumstances. The game puts a greater emphasis on hyperbolic fun.

The expansion's zombie enemies are similar to those of other games. "Walker" zombies are slow from afar but run when they near the character. Fat zombies attempt to knock the player-character down and others spew green venom. John has new weapons, including holy water, bait for the undead, and a blunderbuss that uses zombie parts as ammunition. The player can use a combination of these skills to defeat hordes of reanimated humans, who stop only once their heads explode. For example, John can bait a group to an area to set off a bomb, use the time-slowing Dead Eye mode to shoot each in the head, or eliminate enemies from a roof because zombies cannot climb. Other non-playable characters who contract the infection turn into the undead in real-time and are likely to attack the player.

Undead Nightmare removes the traditional fast travel features of the base game, and this encourages the player to use settlements to store their caravan. John rides undead horses in Undead Nightmare, which he can summon by whistling. Four mythical horses—the four horses of the apocalypse—with faster abilities are scattered throughout the game for the player to find, tame, and ride. Other mythical creatures to hunt include Sasquatch, El Chupacabra, and a unicorn. Also included are two new outfits for John, other cosmetic options for weapons and player horses ("mounts"), and new achievements.

Apart from the single-player story, Undead Nightmare adds two multiplayer modes: Undead Overrun and Land Grab. The former is a horde mode in which up to four players cooperatively fight off waves of zombies. Players must open coffins between waves to replenish a countdown timer, which discourages players from camping in the same location. It is also designed so as to encourage cooperation such that players can revive each other if nearby. The other mode, Land Grab, is an additional game mode within the main game's multiplayer free roam and otherwise unconnected to the undead theme. In Land Grab, players attempt to secure seven areas across the game's environment. While players with the base game can join in Land Grab games, only Undead Nightmare owners can initiate them.

== Plot ==
Shortly after being reunited with his family, John Marston (Rob Wiethoff) is trying to lead a peaceful life with his wife Abigail (Sophia Marzocchi), son Jack (Josh Blaylock), and friend Uncle (Spider Madison) on their ranch at Beecher's Hope. One stormy night, however, Uncle is nowhere to be found and the Marstons, assuming he has found shelter elsewhere, go to sleep. In the middle of the night, they are awakened by a zombified Uncle, who bites Abigail; she in turn bites Jack, turning them into zombies as well. After killing Uncle and tying up Abigail and Jack, John sets out to find a cure and goes to the town of Blackwater in search of a doctor, only to find it nearly abandoned.

John runs into one of his former allies, Professor Harold MacDougal (Joe Ochman), who theorizes that a virus has caused the dead to come back to life. After MacDougal is killed by an undead Nastas, John encounters other survivors and helps clear Blackwater and the nearby cemetery of the undead. He then learns that another two of his former allies, con artist Nigel West Dickens (Don Creech) and treasure hunter Seth Briars (Kevin Glikmann), are supposedly responsible for the outbreak. John meets with both men, who deny any involvement, though Seth voices his suspicions that the Aztecs had something to do with the entire ordeal and advises John to go to Mexico.

John travels to Nuevo Paraíso, only to discover that it is in a much worse state than America. He encounters a group of nuns led by Mother Superior Calderón (Irene DeBari), who reveals a woman has told her that Abraham Reyes, whom John had helped take over Nuevo Paraíso, is responsible for the outbreak. When John goes to meet with said woman, he finds her attacked by a zombified Reyes, whom he kills. The woman informs John that Reyes triggered the zombie plague when he stole an Aztec mask from some nearby catacombs, and became a zombie himself when he donned the mask. Venturing into the catacombs, John and the woman are able to return the mask to its rightful place, ending the plague. The woman then reveals herself as the Aztec goddess Ayauhteotl and thanks John for his help, gifting him one of the four horses of Apocalypse to return home.

John returns to Beecher's Hope to find that Jack and Abigail have been cured, and is happy to be reunited with his family. Months later, following John's death, Seth finds and steals the Aztec mask, causing the dead to rise from their graves once again. John is among those resurrected, but because he was buried with holy water, he is now a revenant, keeping possession of his soul.

== Development ==
Following the 2010 release of the base game, Rockstar San Diego prepared and released a series of downloadable content packs, of which Undead Nightmare was one. The Red Dead Redemption world was designed to be not necessarily serious but within the Western genre without regressing to "cheesy or camp" pastiche. After finding success, Rockstar wanted to make more content in keeping with the game's atmosphere. The team balanced the "inherently ridiculous" zombie concept with their horror aspects and some self-aware humor. They relied on the backstory of the universe's characters and popular associations with the American countryside to build the narrative's emotional content. In the game's canon, the Undead Nightmare scenario fits in the time between when John Marston returns home and the end of the base game, though the expansion's events do not cross the main story in any way.

Rockstar found a match in the Red Dead Redemption universe for their long-standing aim to create a zombie game. In lieu of making a new intellectual property for such a game, Rockstar instead wanted players to see how a zombie outbreak affected a world already familiar to them. The company thought that this would make the zombie trope more interesting. Rockstar also saw similar "cinematic heritage" between the Western and zombie horror genres. The team used the analogy of a 1970s film set to explain their ambitions—that Undead Nightmare in the Red Dead Redemption universe would feel like its characters filming a "serious, revisionist Western" by day and a "somewhat insane horror movie" with the same cast and set by night. Following its experience with Grand Theft Auto IV's downloadable content packs, Rockstar wanted its add-on packs to be a separate story with possible overlaps rather than a continuation of the main story. Rockstar vice president of creative Dan Houser described several reasons for not using the Grand Theft Auto universe for the zombie release: (1) that Red Dead's shooting mechanics, including its slow-motion Dead Eye feature, were a better fit for zombie headshots, (2) that zombies were a better fit for the Great Plains landscape, more reminiscent of a 1970s horror film, and (3) that John's character was a better fit for hunting zombies than the protagonists of Grand Theft Auto games.

Houser said that reviews of the base game had little impact on the development of Undead Nightmare, though the team used the smaller downloadable content packs and patches to add features that others wanted in the main game. "I don't think we ever saw the phrase 'what this game is missing is the supernatural'", Houser recollected on the team's feedback and their interest in doing something that would not be expected by fans yet enjoyed nonetheless. "And that is part of what attracted us." The rapper Oh No made drum tracks for the expansion as preparation for his work on Grand Theft Auto V. Rockstar released Undead Nightmare on October 26, 2010. Rockstar's Dan Houser said that the team was satisfied with their results and how the Red Dead Redemption world and zombie theme supplemented each other's context and depth.

A standalone retail disc release of Undead Nightmare followed in late November 2010. The release compiles the Undead Nightmare campaign with two smaller Red Dead Redemption download packs: "Legends and Killers" and "Liars and Cheats". "Legends and Killers" adds more multiplayer features, such as challenges and maps. "Liars and Cheats" adds multiplayer versions of the tabletop bar games featured in the game's single-player campaign. Since the base game and its expansion share the same multiplayer, Official Xbox Magazine described the standalone Undead Nightmare as the same as the original game save for having swapped its single-player campaign for a new one. Rockstar Games released an additional multiplayer download pack, "Myths and Mavericks", in September 2011, which included new multiplayer characters from the single-player story and new multiplayer locations. The game was released for the Nintendo Switch and PlayStation 4 on August 17, 2023, developed by Double Eleven. A physical release was released on October 13. The game was released for Windows on October 29, 2024. Versions for Android and iOS mobile devices (including via Netflix Games subscriptions), and for the Nintendo Switch 2, PlayStation 5, and Xbox Series X/S (developed by Double Eleven and Cast Iron Games), were released on December 2, 2025.

== Reception ==
Reception

Aggregate score
Aggregator	Score
Metacritic	87/100

Review scores
Publication	Score
Eurogamer	8/10
GameSpot	8/10
IGN	10/10
Official Xbox Magazine (UK)	9/10
The Guardian	4/5

Undead Nightmare received "generally favorable" reviews, according to review aggregator website Metacritic, and was named among the best downloadable content of the year. It won the award for best downloadable content of the year at the 2010 Spike Video Game Awards, and at Shacknews over other notable packs like Lair of the Shadow Broker (Mass Effect 2) and Minerva's Den (BioShock 2). IGN's Kristine Steimer awarded the title a perfect score as a "masterpiece" and editor's choice, while GameSpot's Justin Calvert wrote that, while fun, the game was not as much a masterpiece as the original. Dan Whitehead from Eurogamer credited Undead Nightmare's nuanced treatment of John Marston as proof of him being "one of gaming's great characters".

As a continuation, "Red Dead Redemption's elegiac tone knits incredibly well with [its expansion's] arch Gothic horror", wrote Whitehead. Critics found the expansion's story to be much more lighthearted in comparison to the main game, with a different overall feel. Steimer (IGN) marked the title's exaggerated theatricality and overtones of horror B movie panache. At the time, zombies were a recurring motif in video games. Whitehead added that Rockstar's ability to use the "most played-out and over-exposed cultural meme" in their "epic Western" without the product appearing silly or gimmicky was a testament to their design acumen. For instance, a talk with Sasquatch was both absurd and poignant. The expansion's script, he wrote, understood the spirit of its characters and balanced sardonicism and honest pathos. While Whitehead liked the treatment of the main character, he considered the expansion's mission design lackluster and complained of too many quests in which the player fetches items for other people and traveling between points only to initiate cutscenes. Calvert (GameSpot) praised the story's humor but felt that it was less interesting and varied compared to the main game. Reviewers recommended finishing the base game before starting the downloadable content, not for spoilers but to make the most of the game's references to the original story.

Reviewers noted the amount of work Rockstar put into the expansion's production. Calvert (GameSpot) said that the expansion added significantly new features and kept the main game's best qualities in its presentation. Whitehead (Eurogamer) wrote that Rockstar's effort appeared to challenge their constraints while other developers often aim for the bare minimum. The reviewer compared the game's reinvigoration to that of the download content created for Rockstar's Grand Theft Auto IV. He also appreciated the continuity of the "apocalyptic" and melancholic ambience in which the base game considered the metaphorical extinction of the cowboy west while the expansion considered the literal extinction of civilization. Critics noted ways in which Undead Nightmare borrowed zombie designs from the Left 4 Dead series. This disappointed Eurogamer's reviewer in consideration of Rockstar's reputation as a pioneer rather than an imitator. GameSpot's highlights from the game included its multiplayer, imaginative weaponry, mythical mounts, and eerie soundtrack.

Critics reported that players rarely need to use Undead Nightmare's new weapons. Whitehead (Eurogamer) said that Marston's firearms are mostly indistinguishable apart from the blunderbuss, which is only useful when the player is overrun by zombies. Calvert (GameSpot) added that the game's combat is repetitive and less fun in the expansion, as zombies barely pose a threat; without guns, cover, and horses, they lack the complexities of cowboys and, apart from some special zombie types, are only a threat at short distances. The reviewer found little variation between weapons when firing at close range, which is more effective than aiming at a distance. The fun of the new guns quickly faded for Calvert, who found little incentive to use traditional gunfight strategies. Whitehead (Eurogamer) too noted that the base game relied on its use of cover during gunfights, which the expansion jettisons altogether. Thus the player is forced into the technique of backtracking and turning to use the time-slowing Dead Eye mode to clear zombies with headshots. The reviewer also found the controls clumsy and often tripped on piles of zombie bodies or became stuck in doorways. While the idea of zombie animals scared Whitehead, he was both relieved and disappointed to find that bears and cougars, like the humans, died with a single bullet.

Eurogamer noted the annoyance of returning to defend over 20 towns each with recurring zombie problems, but said that the game mechanic is never too bothersome and even appreciated its element of time management, similar to that of the Dead Rising game series. IGN thought that the lack of fast travel was an impediment. Reviewers also noted technical issues with moving John's character, especially when climbing ladders and outrunning zombies.

Critics praised Undead Nightmare as a model for downloadable content especially in its balance of content and price. Neil Davey (The Guardian) said it was the best purchase of 2010 at its price range, but Official Xbox Magazine found the price slightly too high. Henry Gilbert of GamesRadar thought the game's concept sounded like a ploy to make easy money without much work, but admitted how wrong and surprised he was at the game's depth. In 2010, the Official Xbox Magazine counted Undead Nightmare among the best downloadable content in existence. The standalone retail disc had sold two million units as of August 2011. No sales figures were released regarding the download pack itself. Red Dead Redemption's PlayStation 4, Nintendo Switch, and Windows versions were praised for the inclusion of Undead Nightmare, though some critics lamented the US$49.99 price due to lack of significant enhancements and omission of multiplayer.

== Legacy ==
Undead Nightmare has been called one of the best expansion packs ever produced for a video game. Kotaku wrote of its originality, despite the trite zombie theme, and added that the expansion functioned best when Rockstar used the game's pretense to exercise their sense of humor, with undead versions of normal animals, and new mythical creatures. The reviewer related the game's level of entertainment to it being the first Rockstar release in years to "wholeheartedly embrace the inherently madcap nature of open world games". Undead Nightmare took a good title and "put it over the top", as USgamer put it. Hardcore Gamer cited the expansion as an example of downloadable content that would have never fit in the main game but instead let the developers explore other ideas.

Microsoft added the game to its backwards compatibility list for Xbox One, the successor to the Xbox 360, in July 2016. The release runs at a smoother frame rate on the Xbox One. In April 2018, the game received an update as an "Xbox One X enhanced" title, making the original game code playable at 4K resolution (an increase from the game's original 720p resolution) and with some graphical improvements on the high-end revision of Xbox One, called Xbox One X. The Xbox Series X and Series S can also play the game, with the higher-end Series X running it with its Xbox One X-specific enhancements. Sony added Red Dead Redemption and Undead Nightmare to its PlayStation Now cloud gaming subscription service in December 2016, which allowed them to be played on PlayStation 4, PlayStation 5, and Windows; they were removed in October 2022.
