= Rob Wiethoff =

American actor (born 1976)

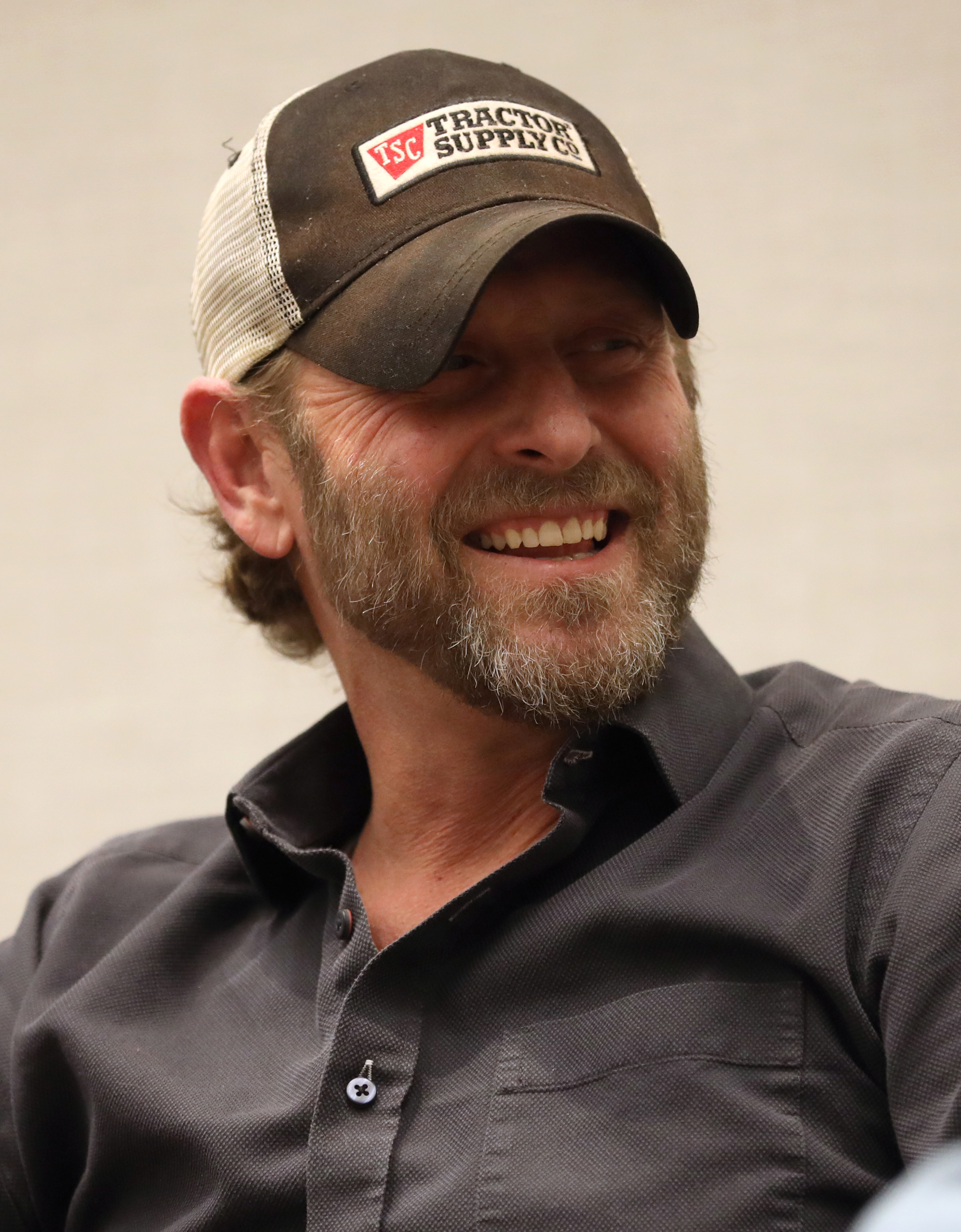
- Wiethoff at the Phoenix Convention Center in 2024
- Born: Robert Allen Wiethoff; September 15, 1976 (age 50); Seymour, Indiana, U.S
- Education: Indiana University Bloomington
- Occupation: Actor
- Years active: 2006–present
- Spouse: Tayler Pitchford (m. 2011)
- Children: 2
- Rob Wiethoff's voice Rob Wiethoff discussing the auditioning process for Red Dead Redemption; Recorded May 2023

Robert Allen Wiethoff (born September 15, 1976) is an American actor. He is best known for portraying John Marston in the 2010 video game Red Dead Redemption, its expansion Undead Nightmare, and the 2018 prequel Red Dead Redemption 2. Born and raised in Seymour, Indiana, Wiethoff attended Seymour High School, and graduated from Indiana University Bloomington in 1999. Soon afterwards, he moved to Los Angeles to pursue acting, but faced difficulty in finding roles, other than small parts in films and television advertisements. In 2008, Rockstar Games cast Wiethoff as John Marston, the lead character in Red Dead Redemption; he worked on the game for almost two years. For his role, he won Outstanding Character Performance at the 14th Annual Interactive Achievement Awards.

Following the release of Red Dead Redemption, Wiethoff moved back to Seymour to focus on his family, marrying his wife Tayler, with whom he has two children. He briefly returned to acting in New York City for Undead Nightmare, the downloadable content pack for Red Dead Redemption, but remained in Seymour afterwards to work in construction, allowing him to spend time with his family. In 2014, Wiethoff returned to portray John Marston in Red Dead Redemption 2, a prequel to the original game. Though he was told that he would be required for about a year, he ultimately worked on the game for almost four years, as his role was expanded to become a playable character like the first game; Red Dead Redemption 2 was released in 2018.

== Early life and education ==
Robert Allen Wiethoff was born in Seymour, Indiana on September 15, 1976, to Dr. Richard Allen Wiethoff and Nancy Louise Wiethoff (née Sproull), the younger brother of Kimberly. Wiethoff's paternal grandfather, Clifford Allen Wiethoff (1920–2010), played on the 1939–40 Indiana Hoosiers men's basketball team. When he was 17 months old in February 1978, Wiethoff cut off his left ring finger by grabbing the chain of an exercise bicycle; it was re-attached at the Jewish Hospital in Louisville, and Wiethoff became the youngest person in the world to have undergone a successful replant. The incident was set to feature on an episode of America Alive! in September 1978, but later rescheduled.

Wiethoff attended Seymour High School, and graduated from Indiana University Bloomington with a degree in general studies in 1999. He had considered studying aviation at Purdue University. Wiethoff felt that he "found [his] partying legs" at university, and that he did not take it seriously. He worked several jobs around this time, including as a bouncer in Chicago and as a recruiter for information technology companies.

== Career ==
While attending Indiana University, Wiethoff dated a woman who later moved to Los Angeles. He visited there for a week and was convinced by many people that they could get him acting roles in films, and he moved shortly after; though he did not take the offers seriously, he felt that it would be more enjoyable than working construction in Indiana. The promises that were offered to him failed to come true, and Wiethoff was left working as a bartender. He did not receive many jobs in acting, other than a few small roles in small films and television advertisements. He ultimately lived in Los Angeles for about ten years.

Wiethoff was cast as protagonist John Marston in the video game Red Dead Redemption (2010) by Rockstar Games. He auditioned for the role in December 2008 by folding laundry while reading his lines. He felt that the audition was a waste of time, but received the role a few days later. He worked on the game for almost two years, with principal production lasting around six weeks. Recording would take place over a few weeks, before taking a break of a month or two. Wiethoff estimated that around 12–15 scenes were recorded each day. The recording crew often referred to scenes from Rockstar's Grand Theft Auto IV (2008) during production; Wiethoff pretended to understand before eventually admitting that he had not played the game. For his role in Red Dead Redemption, Wiethoff won Outstanding Character Performance at the 14th Annual Interactive Achievement Awards. He was nominated for Best Performance by a Human Male at the 2010 Spike Video Game Awards, where John was also nominated for Character of the Year. In 2013, Complex named Wiethoff's performance as one of the best in a video game, praising the growth of the character.

After his work on Red Dead Redemption in May 2010, Wiethoff moved back to Seymour to focus on his family; he started working at an industrial supplies company. About a month after moving back, he was asked to return for the downloadable content Undead Nightmare (2010), which was recorded in New York City, instead of Los Angeles. In November 2010, Wiethoff began working for Bob Poynter GM as part of the sales team. He soon got hired in construction, which allowed him to spend time with his family. Wiethoff voiced Lazarus in the interactive radio drama Codename Cygnus in September 2013.

In 2014, Rockstar Games asked Wiethoff to return for another game: Red Dead Redemption 2 (2018), a prequel to Red Dead Redemption. He was told that he would be required for about a year; he used all of his annual leave and sick leave from his job to work on the game. When he was eventually denied permission to take more leave, he quit his job and started working construction jobs for his brother-in-law during filming breaks. Wiethoff spent almost four years on the game, as his role was expanded to become a playable character like the first game. Wiethoff looked to his own life when returning to the character; he always looked up to his older sister's male friends for approval in the same way that John looks up to the rest of the gang for validation. He also took inspiration from the "pretty tough dudes" in his home town for John's personality.

After the game's release, Wiethoff turned his chicken coop into a home office filled with art and gifts he has received from fans, several of which he has garnered from the conventions that he attends. Wiethoff starred in an undisclosed voice role in the film Lulu and the Electric Dreamboat (2023). In 2024, he started an OnlyFans account to document himself working out to "get ripped".

== Personal life ==
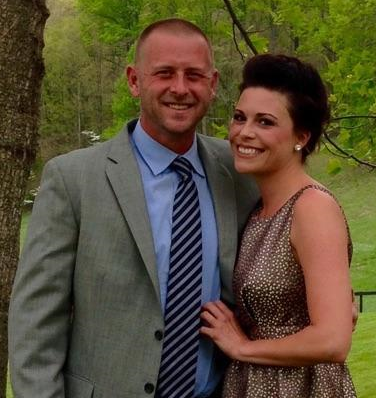
Wiethoff with his wife Tayler in 2015

Wiethoff married Tayler Nicole Pitchford on June 10, 2011. They met in Los Angeles—where Tayler grew up—during development of Red Dead Redemption. After the game's release in May 2010, the couple moved to Seymour to start a family. Their twin boys were born on October 28, 2011. They were born prematurely at approximately 28 weeks, which led to them requiring extensive medical attention following their birth; they spent about seven weeks in a neonatal intensive care unit.

== Filmography ==
=== Film ===
Year	Title	Role	Ref.
2006	16 Blocks	Court Officer	
2009	The Outside	Turk	
2010	Red Dead Redemption: The Man from Blackwater	John Marston	
2011	Double Tap	Detective Fitzgerald	
2023	Lulu and the Electric Dreamboat	Undisclosed Voice Role	

=== Video games ===
Year	Title	Role	Notes
2010	Red Dead Redemption	John Marston	Performance capture
2010	Undead Nightmare	John Marston	Performance capture
2013	Codename Cygnus	Lazarus	Interactive radio drama
2018	Red Dead Redemption 2	John Marston	Performance capture

== Awards and nominations ==
Date	Award	Category	Work	Result	Ref.
December 11, 2010	Spike Video Game Awards	Best Performance by Human Male	Red Dead Redemption	Nominated	
February 11, 2011	Interactive Achievement Awards	Outstanding Character Performance	Red Dead Redemption	Won	
