= Irene DeBari =

American television actress

Irene DeBari is an American television actress. In some of her earlier appearances she is credited as Irena Du Barry. Under this previous name, she took the role of Rosa Calletano, wife of Lieutenant Ray Calletano, in the TV drama Hill Street Blues. She has also been credited as Irene De Bari and (in her earliest work) Irene Rosetti.

Her professional acting career began in 1967, and she remains active and working.
