= Steve J. Palmer =

American actor

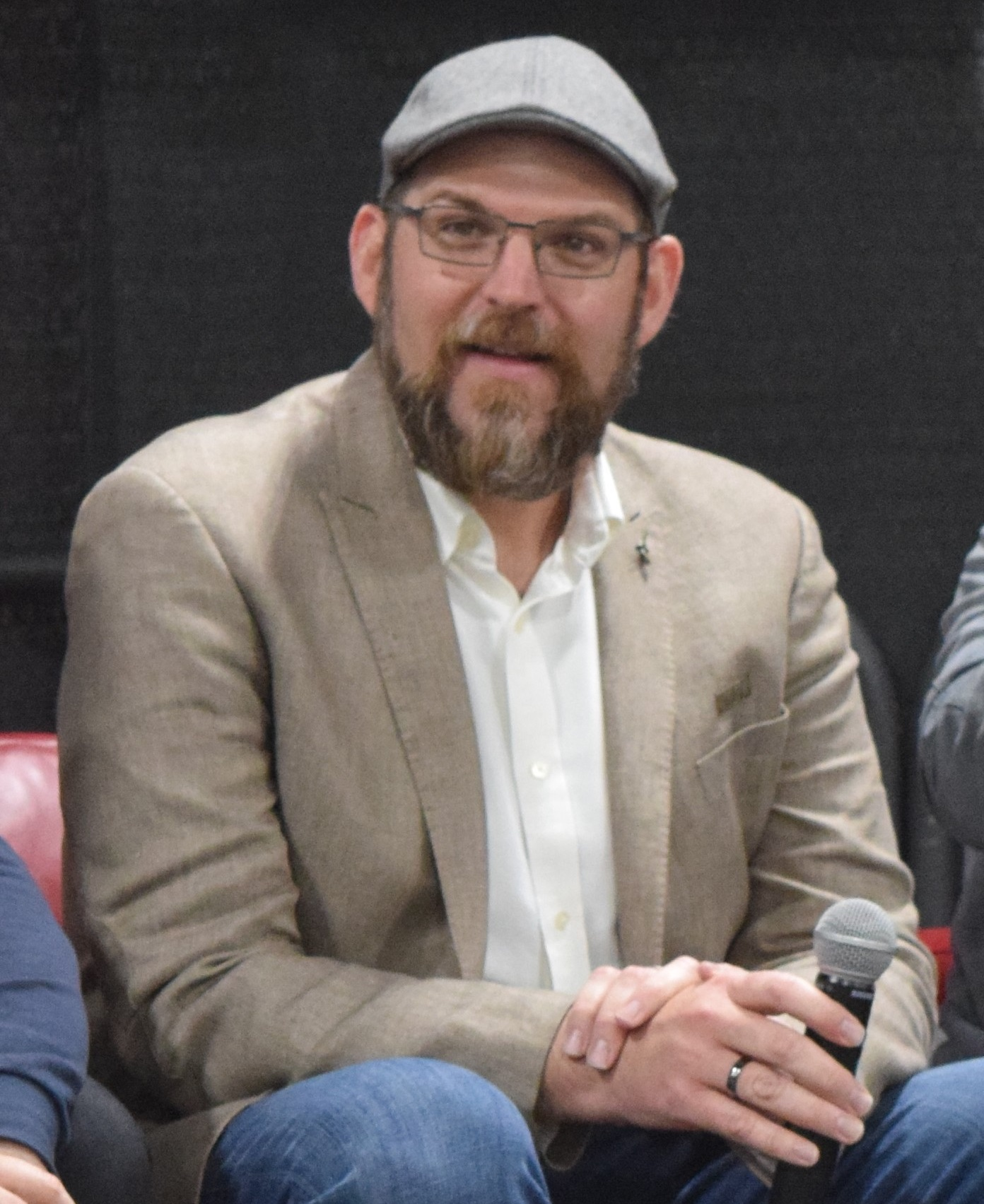
- Palmer in 2019
- Born: November 8, 1975 (age 49); New Hartford, New York, U.S.
- Occupation(s): Actor, producer
- Years active: 2005–present

Steven J. Palmer (born November 8, 1975) is an American actor and producer. He is best known for providing the voice and motion capture for Bill Williamson in the 2010 video game Red Dead Redemption, and its 2018 prequel Red Dead Redemption 2.

== Early life and career ==
Steven J. Palmer was born in New Hartford, New York on November 8, 1975. In the late 1970s, his father moved his family to Daytona Beach, Florida. He graduated from Seabreeze High School in the 1990s, later attending Daytona State College. He holds a B.A. in Fine Arts from the University of South Carolina Aiken, and is an alumnus of the iO West.

== Filmography ==
=== Film ===
| Year | Title | Role | Notes |
|---|---|---|---|
| 2007 | Kill Your Inner Child | Adam | Video |
| 2016 | Moonbound24: The Movie | Professor Avil Solemncrest | TV movie |

=== Television ===
| Year | Title | Role | Notes |
|---|---|---|---|
| 2006 | Deadwood | Hearst Bodyguard | Episode: "Tell Him Something Pretty" |
| 2008 | Emily's Reasons Why Not | Karaoke Bar Patron | Episode: "Why Not to Date Your Gynecologist" |
| 2014 | House of Lies | Bartender | Episode: "Power(less)" |
| 2014 | Queen Gorya | Terry Bowman | Episode: "Pilot" |
| 2017 | Moonbound24: The Webseries | Professor Avil Solemncrest | Episode: "24 Hours to Lift Off" |
| 2023 | Big City Greens | Yo-Yo Cowboy (voice) | Episode: "Handshaken/Coffee Mates" |

=== Video Games ===
| Year | Title | Role |
|---|---|---|
| 2010 | Red Dead Redemption | Bill Williamson |
| 2018 | Red Dead Redemption 2 | Bill Williamson |
