= John Marston =

Video game character

- Red Dead character
- John Marston as he appears in Red Dead Redemption (left) and Red Dead Redemption 2 (right)
- First appearance: Red Dead Redemption (2010)
- Last appearance: Red Dead Redemption 2 (2018)
- Created by: Rockstar San Diego
- Portrayed by: Rob Wiethoff
- Motion capture: Rob Wiethoff; Marc Menchaca; Daniel Hall; Chris Comfort

In-universe information
- Alias: Jim Milton
- Affiliation: Van der Linde gang
- Spouse: Abigail Roberts
- Children: Jack Marston
- Nationality: American

John Marston is a character in the Red Dead video game series by Rockstar Games. He is the main playable protagonist of the 2010 video game Red Dead Redemption, wherein he must deal with the decline of the Wild West while being forced to hunt down the last surviving members of his old gang in exchange for the safe return of his family by the federal government. John is also the protagonist of Undead Nightmare, a non-canonical, zombie apocalypse-themed expansion pack, and the secondary playable character of the 2018 prequel, Red Dead Redemption 2. The latter game depicts John's life in the gang prior to its demise, and later his attempts to start an honest life with his family.

John is portrayed by Rob Wiethoff through performance capture in both games. The character was developed to be a nuanced, family-focused character in the first game. When returning for the prequel, Wiethoff looked to his younger life for inspiration. The writers felt that John's original role could be limiting in the second game. The character was well received, with many critics citing his maturity, moral complexity and ambiguity, and quest for atonement as focal points of the first game. Wiethoff's portrayal of Marston was also met with acclaim.

== Creation ==
Rob Wiethoff auditioned for the role of John Marston by folding laundry while reading his lines. He was not aware of the game's identity, then only referred to as an "untitled video game project". He felt that the audition was a waste of time, but received the role a few days later. The performance capture process involved simultaneous recording of movement and speech, while a small part was done in a voice-over booth. Wiethoff worked on the first game for almost two years, with principal production lasting around six weeks. The first scene to be recorded was John meeting Nigel West Dickens. Recording would take place over a few weeks, before taking a break of a month or two. Wiethoff estimated that around 12–15 scenes were recorded each day. The recording crew often referred to scenes from Rockstar's previous game, Grand Theft Auto IV (2008); Wiethoff pretended to understand before eventually admitting that he had not played the game.

John was developed to be a nuanced character in Red Dead Redemption, as opposed to an explicit villain or hero, and a "family man". Carson said that Marston "has a foot in both the old world and the world that was to come", and felt that the character became interesting due to the combination of cynicism and realism. Wiethoff felt that the early decisions in John's life were a direct result of his need for acceptance, and that he may not have been aware of his actions. John's physical appearance took "quite a while" for the team to achieve, but they felt that it allowed them to develop an emotional connection to the character. Wiethoff was asked to return for the downloadable content Undead Nightmare about a month after moving back to Seymour, Indiana from Los Angeles, where the first game was recorded; Undead Nightmare was recorded in New York.

When developing John in Red Dead Redemption 2, the writers felt that his previous appearance could be limiting to them, since players have already resonated with the character. Wiethoff looked to his own life when returning to the character; he always looked up to his older sister's male friends for approval in the same way that John looks up to the rest of the gang for validation. He also took inspiration from the "pretty tough dudes" in his home town for John's personality.

== Character ==
While marketing materials for Red Dead Redemption presented John as a traditional cowboy—isolated and violent, a "white, heteronormative, rugged individual"—his behaviour and ambitions in the narrative are generally unconventional. His ambiguity and internal conflict lead him to exhibit "weariness more than manliness". Regardless, John continues to perpetuate stereotypes in some instances; he continues to preserve lives in his missions for the government despite his bitter opposition to them, described as an enactment of Theodore Roosevelt's masculine ideals. Benjamin J. Triana recognized that John's challenges reflected those of straight, cisgender men in the modern era. Matt Margini blamed John's downfall on "the false promises of a world built on hypermasculine ideals", emphasized by his unsuccessful attempts to adopt a new form of masculinity and play an empathetic father to Jack, while Nick Robinson deemed John a victim of government agents who force him into violence "yet ultimately destroy him". Juho Tuominen described John as an idealist.

Several scholars noted that, despite the use of the word "redemption" in the first game's title, such a feat was impossible for John. Kotaku's Heather Alexandra felt that John achieved his redemption upon sacrificing himself to save his family. Triana found that, while John's death "implies transcendence", it is not overtly sacrificial, nor does it represent John as a hero. He also felt that the ending allowed the player to properly understand John's rejection of a developing society and institutions due to the misery endured from the government. While John's violent past rendered him unable to achieve redemption, it also impacted his son's own ability to achieve the American Dream as he becomes an outlaw like his father. Dr. Esther Wright identified that, while John is not overtly racist, his participation in an attack on an Indian reservation implicates him in "a micro-scale recreation of racist, genocidal violence". Triana wrote that Native Americans "end up victims to the game's evil social forces" due to John's priority of reuniting with his family.

== Appearances ==
=== Backstory ===
John's mother, a prostitute, died during childbirth and his father, a Scottish immigrant who had been blinded in a bar fight, died when John was eight years old. John spent a few years in an orphanage before running away. When John was threatened to be lynched after being caught stealing at the age of 12, he was saved by Dutch van der Linde, who took him into his gang and raised him. He remained with the gang as they traveled across the Western United States. When Abigail Roberts joined the gang, she and John fell in love and had a son named Jack. When the gang moved east, John accompanied Dutch and others on a robbery in Blackwater, which ultimately backfired and forced the gang to flee.

=== Red Dead Redemption 2 ===
During the events of the game in 1899, John is sent scouting ahead of the gang while they flee the Pinkertons. After being attacked by wolves and left stranded in the snow, he is saved by fellow gang members Arthur Morgan and Javier Escuella. Once recovered, he joins the gang on some tasks before planning and executing a successful train robbery. During a failed bank robbery, John is captured and incarcerated. Arthur and Sadie rescue him, much to the disdain of Dutch. John, like Arthur, becomes increasingly wary of Dutch's growing paranoia and recklessness; protective of John's family, Arthur warns him to leave the gang when the time is right. John is later left for dead by Dutch during a train robbery but returns to the camp as Arthur is confronting Dutch and Micah Bell. When Pinkertons invade the camp, Arthur and John flee. John returns to his family at Arthur's wishes.

Eight years later, in 1907, John finds honest work with Abigail on a farm, but when John fights back against outlaws threatening him and his employer, Abigail leaves with Jack. John works to get her back by earning enough money to buy a property at Beecher's Hope. He builds a ranch with the help of former gang members Uncle and Charles Smith, while Sadie Adler provides him with jobs to pay off his loans. After Abigail returns, John proposes. With Sadie and Charles, John tracks down and attacks Micah's new gang, where they are shocked to find Dutch. In a Mexican standoff, Dutch unexpectedly shoots Micah, letting John finish him off, before leaving. John finds the gang's loot left behind from Blackwater and uses it to pay off his debts. John and Abigail later get married at their ranch before Sadie and Charles depart. The game's final scene shows federal agents Edgar Ross and Archer Fordham observing John's ranch.

=== Red Dead Redemption ===
In 1911, Ross and Fordham command John to act as a bounty hunter and apprehend his former outlaw friends. To both motivate and ensure that John will comply, the agents kidnap Jack and Abigail, promising their release upon the completion of John's obligations. He works with many individuals throughout the state of New Austin, who help him assault the stronghold of former gang member Bill Williamson. When Bill flees to Mexico to seek the help of Javier Escuella, John pursues them. In Mexico, John becomes unwillingly entangled in a civil war between rebels and soldiers. He reluctantly works for both sides, only wanting information about Bill and Javier, but disavows the soldiers when they betray him. He eventually locates Javier, and the player can decide whether to kill him or give him to the agents. Bill is also tracked down and killed, either by John or the rebel leader Abraham Reyes.

When John returns to collect his family, Ross tells him that he must track down Dutch. After several unsuccessful attacks on Dutch and his operations, John and the agents mount an assault on his hideout. John chases Dutch to a cliff, where the latter steps off and commits suicide. With his old gang dead, John and his family are returned to their ranch. He spends some time working on the ranch, but it is soon attacked by a detachment of U.S. soldiers led by Ross; Uncle is killed in the ensuing gunfight. John defends his family and sends them away to safety, staying behind to confront the soldiers and Ross. He is shot and killed and, following the soldiers' departure, is buried on a hillside by his family.

=== Undead Nightmare ===
In Undead Nightmare, a non-canonical, zombie apocalypse-themed alternate reality, John finds that the world is plagued by a virus that brings the dead back to life with a taste for flesh. After tying up the infected Jack and Abigail, John seeks to discover the source of the plague. He rides to Mexico, where he learns from a nun that Reyes might be responsible. John kills the zombified Reyes and finds a girl, who reveals that Reyes had desecrated several catacombs beneath the government building and had stolen an ancient Aztec mask, unbalancing order and unleashing the undead. John and the girl head down to the tombs and return the mask, ending the plague. John then returns home to find that his family has been cured. Months later, after his death, John rises from his grave, as the mask has been stolen again, causing the dead to rise; however, as John had been buried with holy water, he is a revenant who still retains his soul and his capabilities to use weapons.

== Reception ==
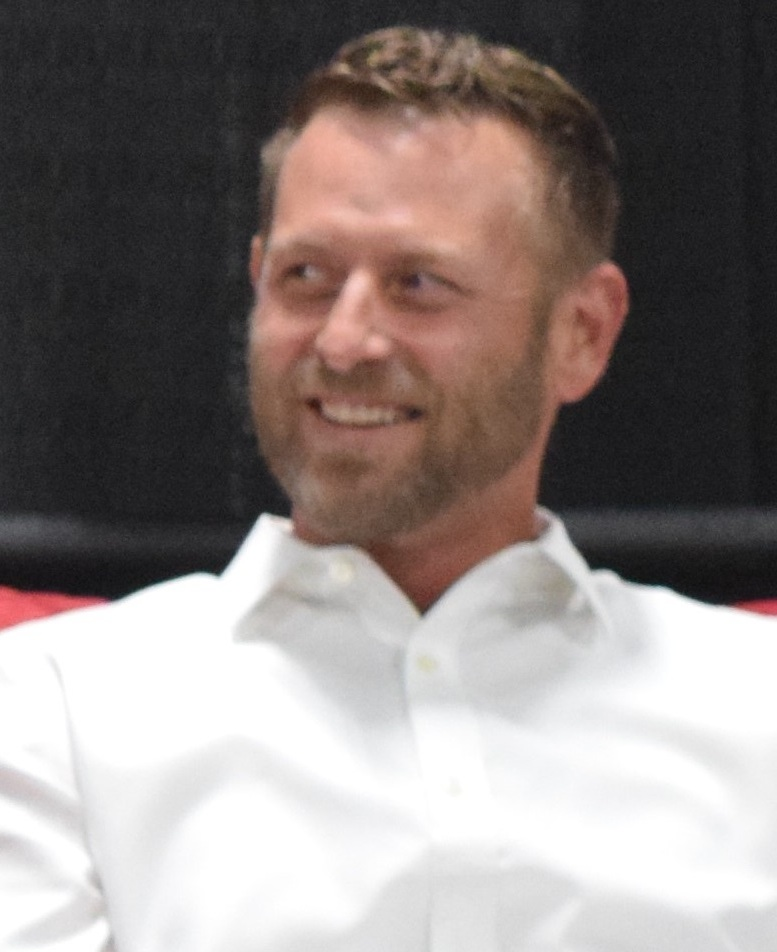
Rob Wiethoff received praise and awards for his performance as John.

The character of John Marston received critical acclaim. Network World's Keith Shaw described John as a "complicated character". Seth Schiesel, writing for The New York Times, stated that "[John] and his creators conjure such a convincing, cohesive and enthralling re-imagination of the real world that it sets a new standard for sophistication and ambition in electronic gaming." GamesRadar named the character among the best of the generation, particularly praising the vulnerability portrayed in his family life. Game Informer's Javy Gwaltney lauded John as Rockstar's best character, noting that the complexities of his personality make him more realistic than most protagonists. IGN's Brian Albert considered John one of the "most badass video game gunslingers", praising his skill and protective nature. Dan Whitehead of Eurogamer wrote that the script for Undead Nightmare understood the spirit of its characters and balanced sardonicism and honest pathos, and felt that its nuanced treatment of John Marston made him "one of gaming's great characters".

Prior to Red Dead Redemption 2's release, Kotaku's Heather Alexandra expressed hesitation towards John's return, as his past remaining vague made the first game compelling. Game Informer staff felt that, by the end of Red Dead Redemption 2, John had developed into "the man we knew him to be in the original game: loving, faithful, honorable, and tragically doomed". Dave Meikleham of GamesRadar wrote that Red Dead Redemption 2's climax was effective in explaining John's behavior in the first game. Polygon's Russ Frushtick considered John's story in the game's epilogue to be more motivating than Arthur's as his quest has a direct purpose. Conversely, Paul Tassi of Forbes found John's story less interesting than Arthur's after spending so much time with the latter, partly due to John's lack of character growth. Jess Joho, writing for Mashable, considered Arthur and John to be "practically interchangeable anti-heroes", noting disappointment at the lack of shifting themes between the two. Game Informer's Gwaltney considered Arthur Morgan to be a better protagonist, citing John's lack of growth throughout the game. Some players criticized the game's patches for changing John's character model, considering it a "downgrade" to more closely resemble Arthur's model.

For his role in Red Dead Redemption, Wiethoff won Outstanding Character Performance at the 14th Annual Interactive Achievement Awards. He was nominated for Best Performance by a Human Male at the 2010 Spike Video Game Awards, where John was also nominated for Character of the Year. In 2013, Complex named Wiethoff's performance as one of the best in a video gaming, praising the growth of the character.

== Bibliography ==
- Humphreys, Sara (2012). "Rejuvenating "Eternal Inequality" on the Digital Frontiers". Western American Literature. 47 (2). University of Nebraska Press: 200–215. doi:10.1353/wal.2012.0048. S2CID 162084363.
- Margini, Matt (2020). Red Dead Redemption. Boss Fight Books. ISBN 978-1-94053-524-1.
- Robinson, Nick (2017). "John Marston". In Banks, Jaime; Mejia, Robert; Adams, Aubrie (eds.). 100 Greatest Video Game Characters. Lanham, Maryland: Rowman & Littlefield. pp. 89–90. ISBN 978-1-4422-7813-4.
- Triana, Benjamin J. (2015). "Red Dead Masculinity: Constructing a Conceptual Framework for Analyzing the Narrative and Message Found in Video Games". Journal of Games Criticism. 2 (2). Rensselaer Polytechnic Institute. Archived from the original on October 12, 2015.
- Tuominen, Juho (October 2020). Rockstar's Open World Video Games as Ideological Apparatuses: A Case Study of Red Dead Redemption Series (PDF) (Thesis). Tampere University. urn:nbn:fi:tuni-202010197385. Archived (PDF) from the original on February 21, 2022.
- Wright, Esther (2021). "Rockstar Games, Red Dead Redemption, and Narratives of "Progress"". European Journal of American Studies. 16 (3). European Association for American Studies. doi:10.4000/ejas.17300. S2CID 240579391.
