= Development of Red Dead Redemption 2 =

Development of 2018 video game

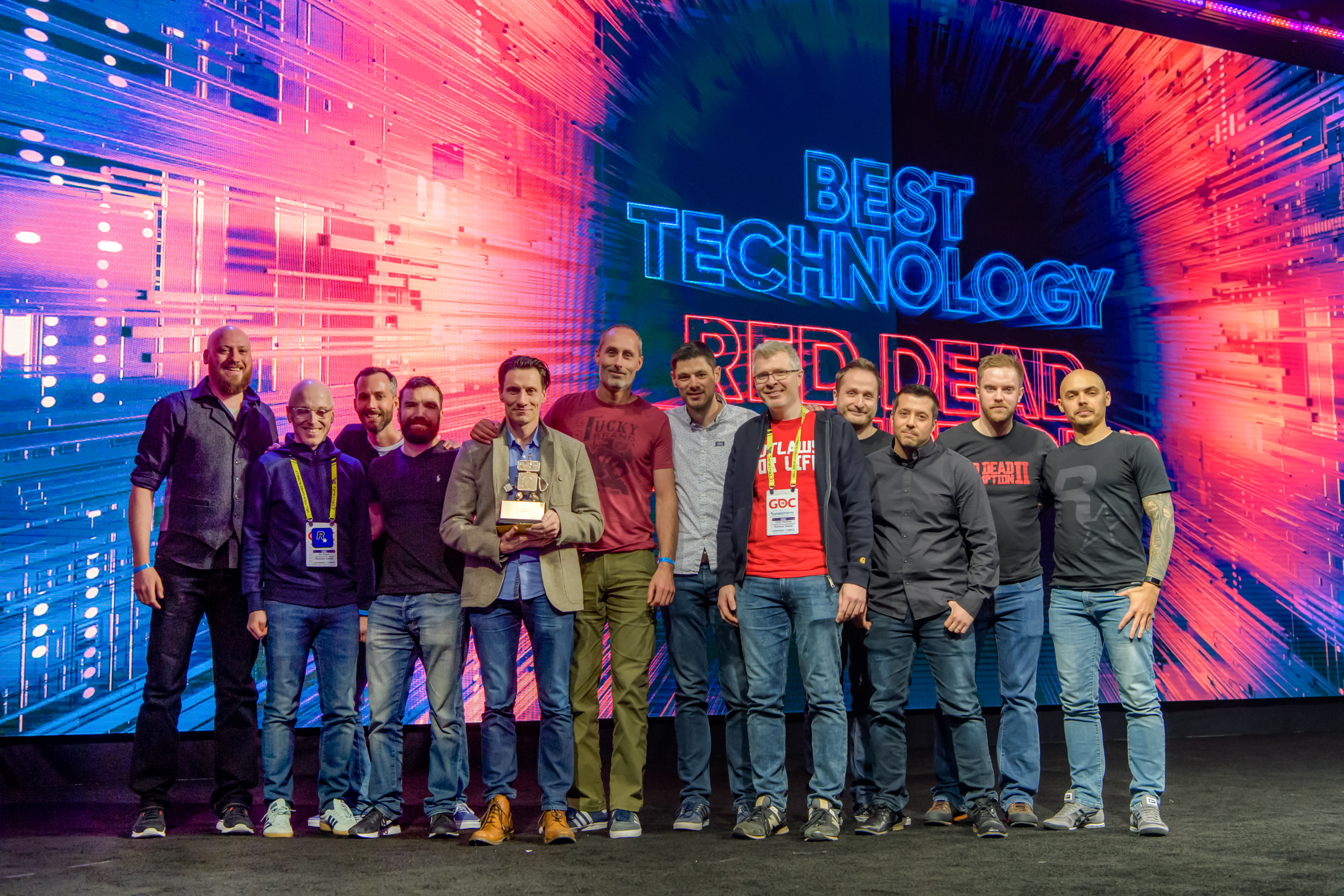
Rockstar Games programmers at the Game Developers Choice Awards 2019

A team of approximately 1,600 people developed Red Dead Redemption 2 over several years. Rockstar Games published the action-adventure game in October 2018 for the PlayStation 4 and Xbox One, and in November 2019 for Windows and Stadia. Rockstar co-opted all of its studios into one large team to facilitate development. The story is set in 1899 in a fictionalized representation of the Western, Midwestern, and Southern United States and follows outlaw Arthur Morgan, a member of the Van der Linde gang. Arthur must deal with the decline of the Wild West while attempting to survive against government forces, rival gangs, and other adversaries. The story also follows fellow gang member John Marston, the protagonist of Red Dead Redemption (2010).

Rockstar used motion capture to record the performances of the cast, as well as face cameras to capture their facial reactions for later animation. The secretive nature of Rockstar's development processes meant that the actors and director were unsure of the future of the characters during production; the writers continued to work on the script while the actors shot their scenes in segments. Rockstar wanted a diverse cast of characters within the Van der Linde gang and put particular focus on the individual stories behind each character. While one of the main themes of the original game was to protect family at all costs, Red Dead Redemption 2 tells the story of the breakdown of a family in the form of the Van der Linde gang.

Red Dead Redemption 2 is the first game from Rockstar built specifically for the PlayStation 4 and Xbox One. Rockstar had tested the technical capabilities of the consoles when porting Grand Theft Auto V. Once the team had defined what limitations were sustainable, they found the areas that required the most focus. The game features an original score, composed by musician Woody Jackson, who worked with Rockstar on Red Dead Redemption and Grand Theft Auto V. The score features contributions from artists such as Colin Stetson, Senyawa, and Arca. Rockstar engaged Daniel Lanois to produce the original vocal tracks for the game, collaborating with artists such as D'Angelo, Willie Nelson, Rhiannon Giddens, and Josh Homme.

Red Dead Redemption 2 was officially announced in October 2016; it was heavily promoted and widely anticipated. Rockstar missed the original release date, delaying the game three times for further polishing. Rockstar marketed the game through video trailers, announcing specific details about the game as development continued. Various special editions of the game were released. The game's development underwent media scrutiny due to the extensive hours expected of employees and the culture of "crunch" at the developer. The game's online multiplayer mode, Red Dead Online, opened its beta in November 2018; the beta ended in May 2019.

== History and overview ==
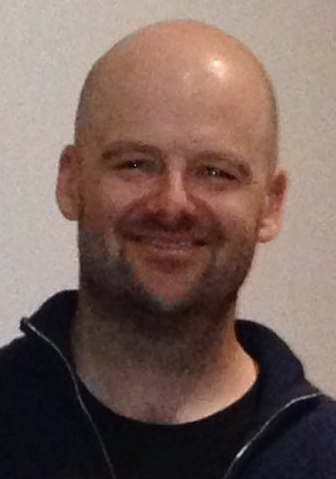
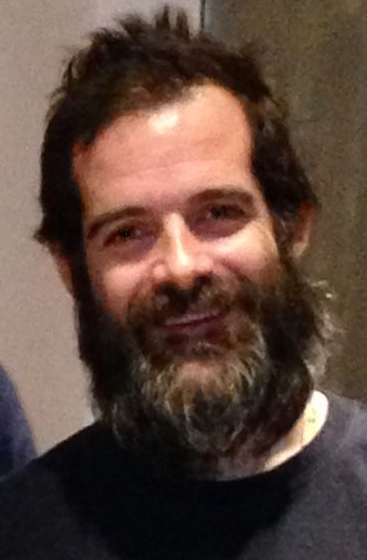
Dan Houser (left) wrote the narrative with Michael Unsworth and Rupert Humphries, and executive-produced the game alongside his brother Sam Houser (right).

Preliminary work on Red Dead Redemption 2 began shortly following the release of the original game, Red Dead Redemption (2010). Publisher Rockstar Games began receiving internal pitches for a sequel during production of the first game and found the idea of a gang narrative "too compelling to turn away". Vice President of Creative Dan Houser and a key team of developers worked on the game's concept. Houser spoke to Rockstar San Diego, the studio behind the original game, in early 2011 about the game's characters and style. The team had a rough outline by mid-year, and by late 2012, rough scripts of the game had been completed. Houser performed read-throughs of the script on video conference calls with animation, art design, and gameplay directors from all of Rockstar's worldwide offices. When Rockstar Games realized a group of distinct studios would not necessarily work, it co-opted all of its studios into one large team, presented simply as Rockstar Games, to facilitate development among 1,600 developers; a total of around 2,000 people worked on the game. Studio director Rob Nelson led the 650-person Rockstar North, joining production full-time in the final half after completing other projects. Analyst estimations place the game's development budget between US$170 and US$240 million, and its marketing budget between US$200 and US$300 million; with a combined total between US$370 and US$540 million, this would make it one of the most expensive video games ever developed.

In October 2018, Houser said the team had been working 100-hour weeks "several times" throughout the year. Many sources interpreted this statement as crunch for the entire development staff of the game, comparable to similar accusations made by wives of Rockstar San Diego employees in regards to the development of the game's predecessor. The following day, Rockstar clarified in a statement the work duration mentioned by Houser only affected the senior writing staff for Red Dead Redemption 2—which comprised himself, Michael Unsworth, Rupert Humphries, and Lazlow Jones—and the duration had only been the case for three weeks during the entire development. Houser added the company would never expect or force any employee to work as long as was stated, and those staying late at the development studios were powered by their passion for the project. Rockstar shared its employees' average reported weekly hours for 2018: 42.4 from January to March, 45.5 from April to June, and 45.8 for July to September. The company lifted its social media policies and allowed developers to speak about their experiences publicly; some supported Houser's statement, noting that conditions had improved since Grand Theft Auto V (2013) and they had never been asked to work 100-hour weeks, and others acknowledged crunch was present but not excessive.

Conversely, some Rockstar employees argued Houser's statements did not give an accurate picture of the "crunch-time culture" at the company that many of its employees worked under, which included "mandatory" overtime and years-long periods of crunch. Due to the salary-based nature of employment contracts, many of these employees were not compensated for their overtime work and instead depended on year-end bonus payments that hinged on the sales performance of the game. After speaking with 77 current and former employees, Kotaku's Jason Schreier reported none had worked 100-hour weeks—many averaged around 55 or 60 hours—but they were often "asked or felt compelled to work nights and weekends"; some Rockstar San Diego employees said 80-hour weeks were often mandatory between 2011 and 2016, being told to "just test [Grand Theft Auto V] for another eight hours" if they had no current work on Red Dead Redemption 2. Crunch on the game started in 2016 or 2017 for some employees. Several admitted it had been their own decision due to their love of the product and desire to create art, while others felt it was necessary due to the frequent overhauls required by Houser and his brother, president and executive producer Sam Houser.

The quality assurance (QA) team faced the worst crunch, followed by the cinematics and design teams, and the Lincoln and New York studios shared the highest number of crunch stories; the former was Rockstar's primary QA studio, consisting of more than 300 employees. Several Lincoln workers claimed overtime had been mandatory from August 2017, while in October 2018 Rockstar claimed and clarified it had been requested but remained optional; Rockstar had requested employees work 52.5 hours per week between October 2017 and August 2018, and 57.5 hours in August and September 2018. Some employees found Rockstar a positive place to work despite crunch, while others considered themselves mistreated and described a "culture of fear" for speaking out. Many reported they suffered from depression as a result of their time at Rockstar and had witnessed breakdowns from current and former employees. Rockstar's reputation meant several workers tolerated the conditions. A sentiment echoed across employee statements was working conditions had somewhat improved since Red Dead Redemption, and any attempts to boycott the game due to crunch reports would be harmful. By April 2020, employees reported that the company had made significant changes as a result of the publicity surrounding the work culture, and many were cautiously optimistic about Rockstar's future.

== Story and setting ==
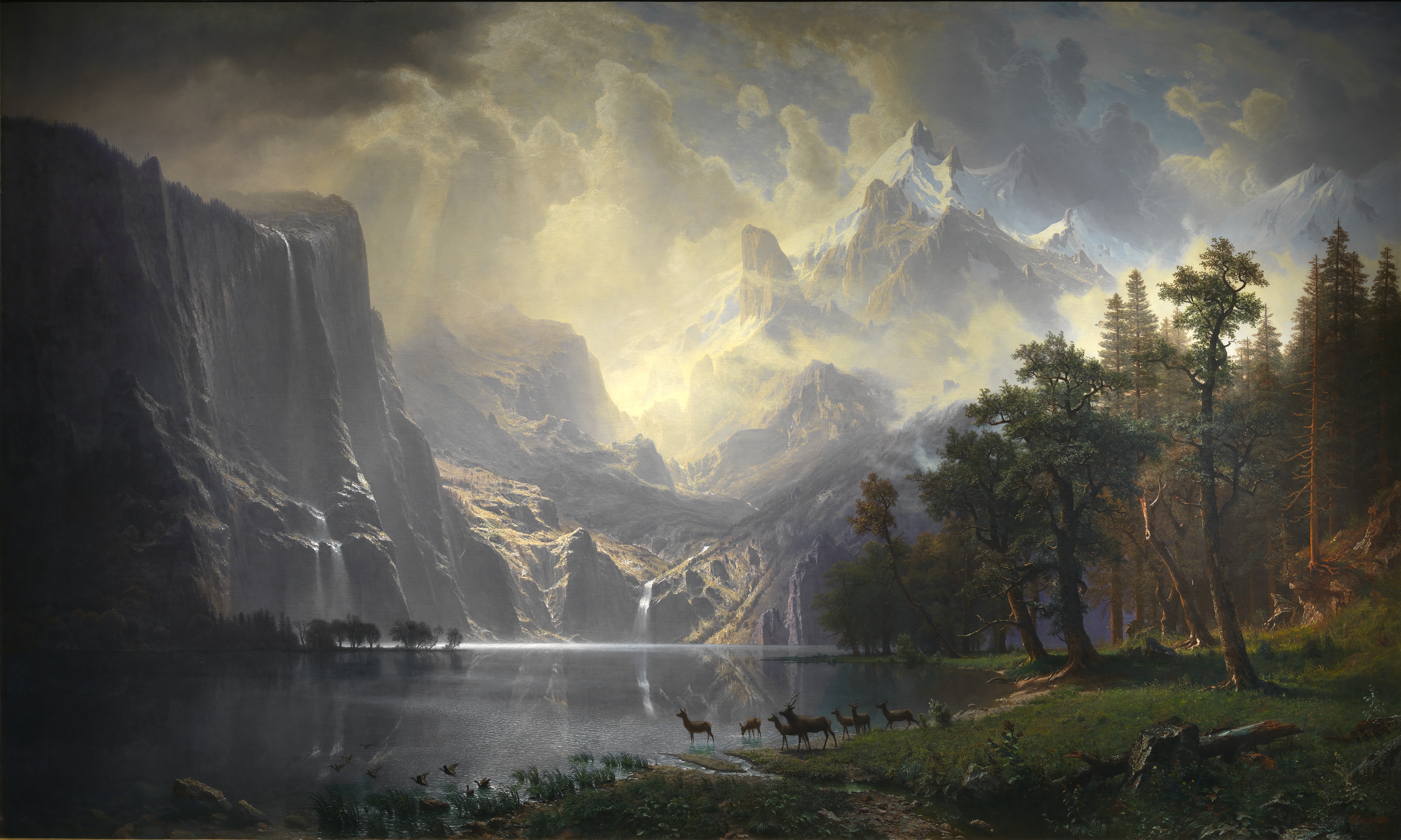
The vistas in the game's world were inspired by the paintings of artists such as Albert Bierstadt.

While one of the main themes of the original game was to protect family at all costs, Red Dead Redemption 2 tells the story of the breakdown of a family in the form of the Van der Linde gang. The team was interested in exploring the story of why the gang fell apart, as frequently mentioned in the first game. Josh Bass, art director at Rockstar San Diego, felt the presence of gang leader Dutch van der Linde "loomed over" the original game. Like the first game, Red Dead Redemption 2 is set during the fall of the American frontier in a world becoming too modern for the gang. Aaron Garbut, Rockstar North director of art, said Rockstar "aimed to capture a wide slice of American life in 1899, a rapidly industrializing nation that would soon have its sights on the world stage". The team focused on creating an accurate reflection of the time period; the game's citizens contrast between rich and poor, while the locales contrast between civilization and wilderness. Houser wanted the gang's withdrawal from society to be the antithesis of the game's calm opening. The first chapter was viewed as a method to freshen the landscape, pitting a group of cowboys against a snowy blizzard. The team redesigned the opening chapter for its extensive length, as Houser considered it the most important chapter. Nelson felt the ending was "the right ending" for the game due to the nature of the original title.

Houser described the narrative scale as "more like Thackeray than Hemingway", with several changes in the characters, locations, and ideologies. He was inspired by film and literature when writing the game, though avoided contemporary works to avoid being accused of idea theft. He cited Uriah Heep, the fictional character from Charles Dickens's David Copperfield (1850), and some of the work of Arthur Conan Doyle as significant influences, as well as Henry James, John Keats, and Émile Zola. Houser wanted some narrative elements to indirectly reflect contemporary events, noting "it's more this sensation that we found interesting in the 19th century that spoke to us, and I hope it speaks to people about today's problems". He did not want the game to be viewed as a work of history but rather as a work of historical fiction, opting to allude to historical events instead of retelling them due to their unpleasantness. The final script for the game's main story was around 2,000 pages, though Houser estimated the pile of pages "would be eight feet high" if all side missions and additional dialogue was included. Individual pedestrian actors each had scripts of around 80 pages in length. About five hours of the game were dumped before release, some of which featured a second love interest for protagonist Arthur Morgan and a mission taking place on a train with bounty hunters; according to Houser, they were removed as "they were never going to work technically or be quite slick enough, or they felt superfluous".

Garbut said the team was not specifically inspired by film or art but rather real locations, noting they "were building a place, not a linear or static representation". Lighting director Owen Shepherd was inspired by pastoral painters such as J. M. W. Turner and Rembrandt. The vistas in the open world were partly inspired by luminous paintings from artists such as Albert Bierstadt, Frank Tenney Johnson, and Charles Marion Russell. Saint Denis is modeled on the city of New Orleans; its original name of New Bordeaux was changed after being used in Mafia III (2016). Rockstar designed the game world to respond to the ongoing narrative; Nelson stated the team were "obsessed with [the world] feeling natural or organic in every respect", and noted the team was "trying to build worlds that people believe in, that they can get lost in".

== Character development ==
Facial motion capture was used to record performances in the game, and facial animations were refined through manual animation.

Red Dead Redemption 2's recording sessions began in 2013 and lasted a total of 2,200 days. The game features 1,200 actors, 700 of whom share the 500,000 lines of voiced dialogue. In addition to using motion capture to record the performances, Rockstar used a face camera to record facial reactions for later animation; around 60 or 70 cameras were used. The motion capture sets were typically accurate to the dimensions of the in-game setting, which could be displayed to the actors and crew on a monitor in a previsualization format. Rockstar wanted a diverse cast of characters within the Van der Linde gang. Senior creative writer Michael Unsworth noted the ensemble was advantageous when writing the narrative as it helped to craft the story and added complexity to the game. The writers put particular focus on individual stories behind each character, exploring their life prior to the gang and their reasons for remaining with the group. Unsworth felt the gang is a "family" that offers "a sense of belonging and purpose", and analyzing each story—and each character's relationship with Arthur—was important for the narrative. Several characters were cut during development as their personalities failed to add to the narrative. Some lines of dialogue from the first game, in which Dutch is described as an equitable leader, allowed the team to create a diverse group of characters in the gang.

The team decided the player would control one character in Red Dead Redemption 2 as opposed to the three protagonists of Grand Theft Auto V as it was more appropriate for the narrative structure of a Western and allowed the player to follow and understand the character more closely. The conversations and sense of life within the gang was inspired by Grand Theft Auto V's exploration of its protagonists while not being controlled by the player. Rockstar wanted to grant the player agency during the story; Unsworth noted Arthur is controlled by neither the writers nor the player but his control consists of "a delicate push and pull between the two". The team attempted to give the player more freedom with Arthur's relationships; when the narrative begins, Arthur has already formed relationships with other gang members, so the team developed them to allow the player to respond appropriately. Houser wanted to subvert the trope of the protagonist starting as weak and becoming stronger as the story progresses; Arthur is already tough at the beginning of the game and is "taken on a more intellectual roller coaster when his world view gets taken apart". Houser felt the decline of the American frontier has a deep impact on Arthur, noting he is "caught between the nastiness of nature and the brutality of encroaching industrialization in civilization".

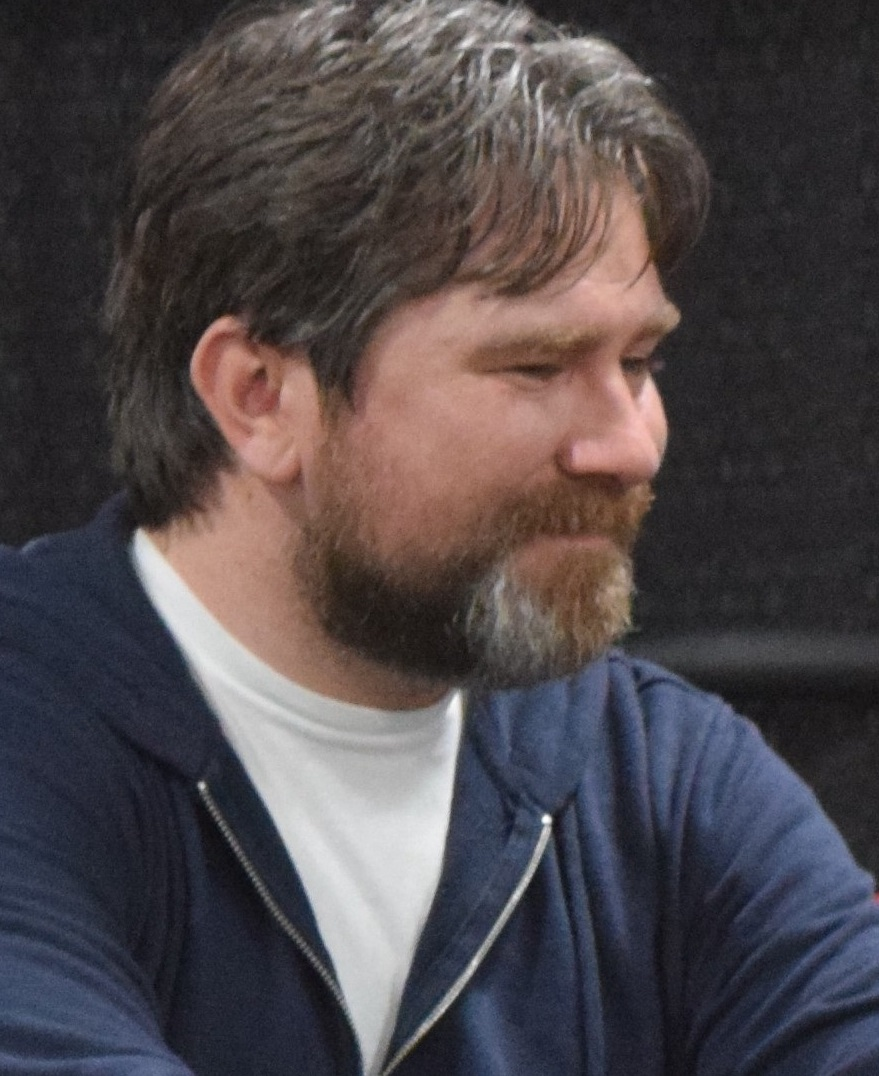
Roger Clark

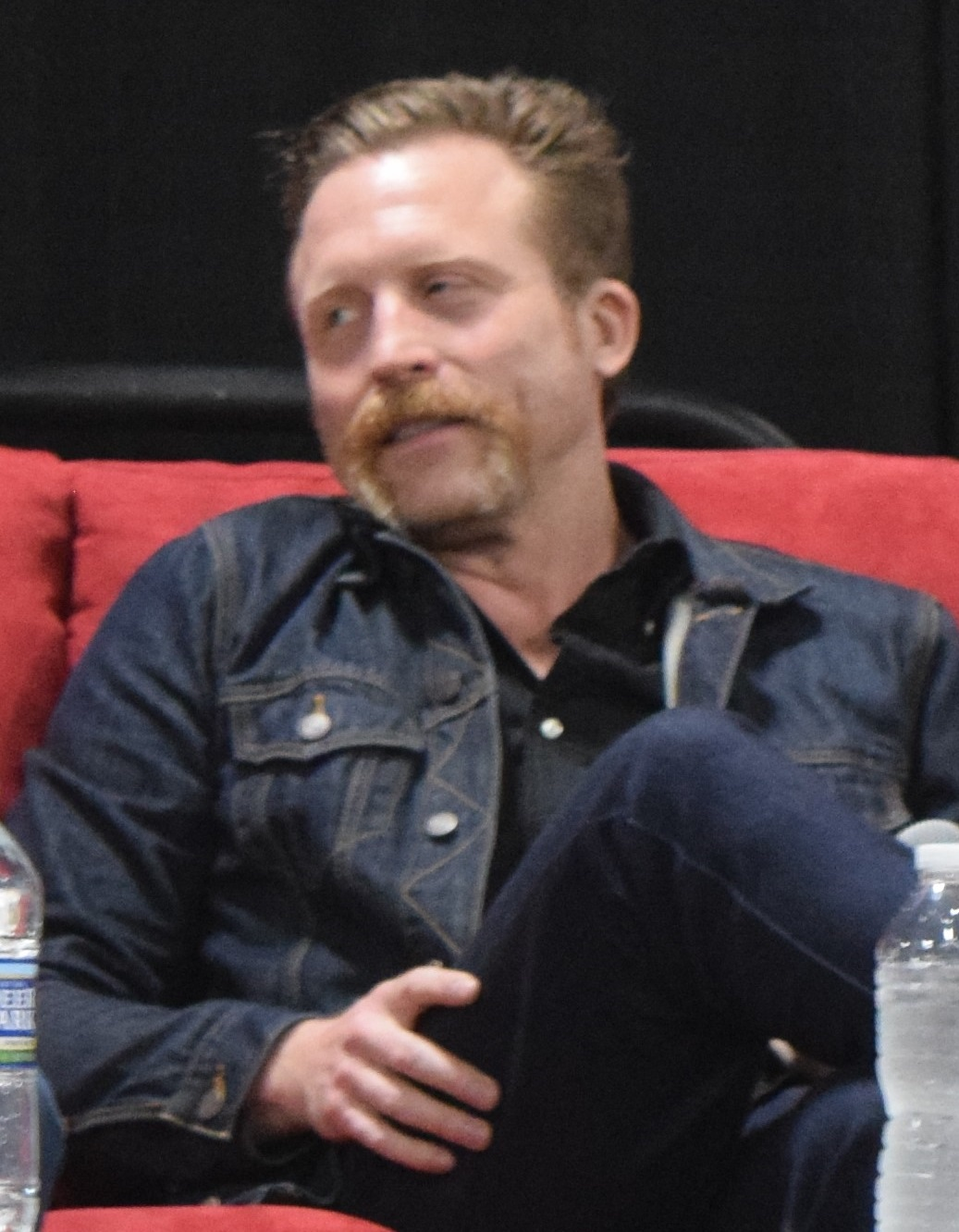
Peter Blomquist

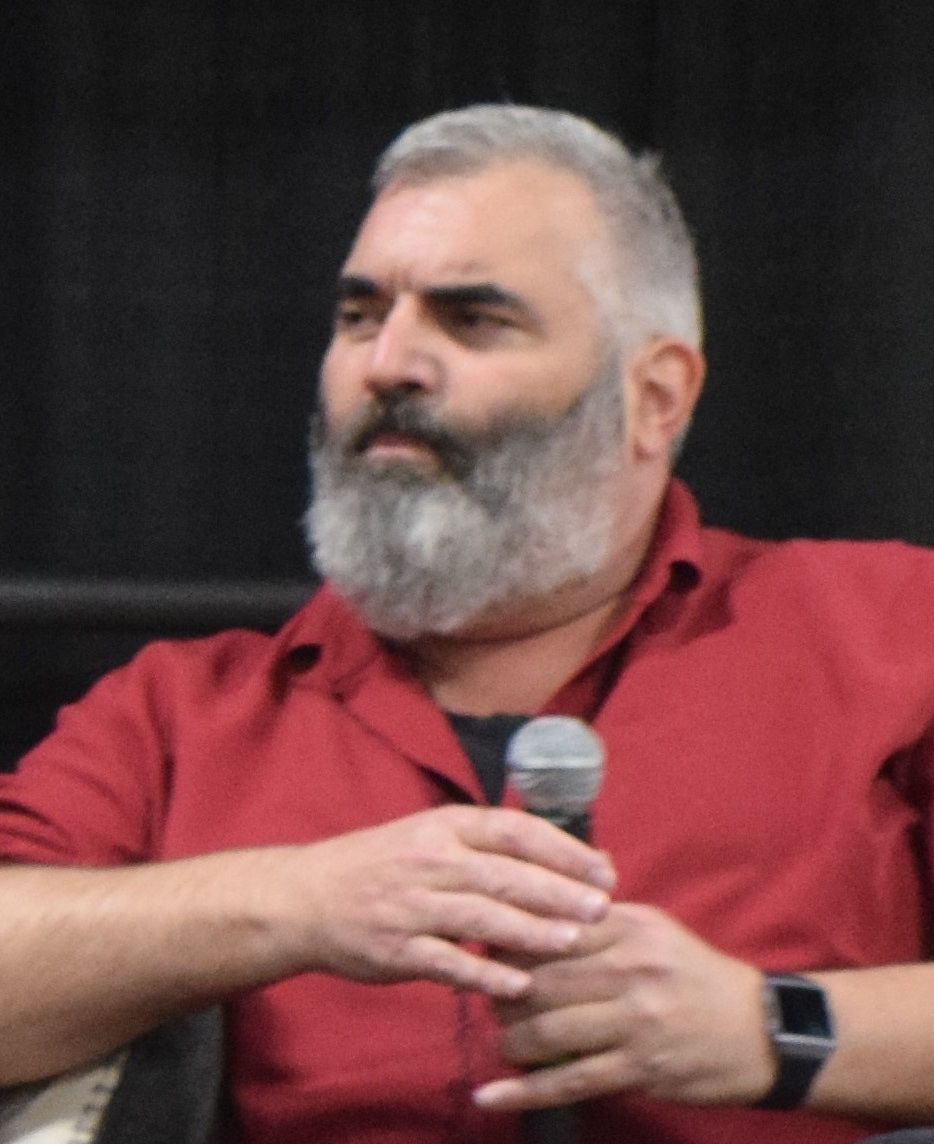
Benjamin Byron Davis

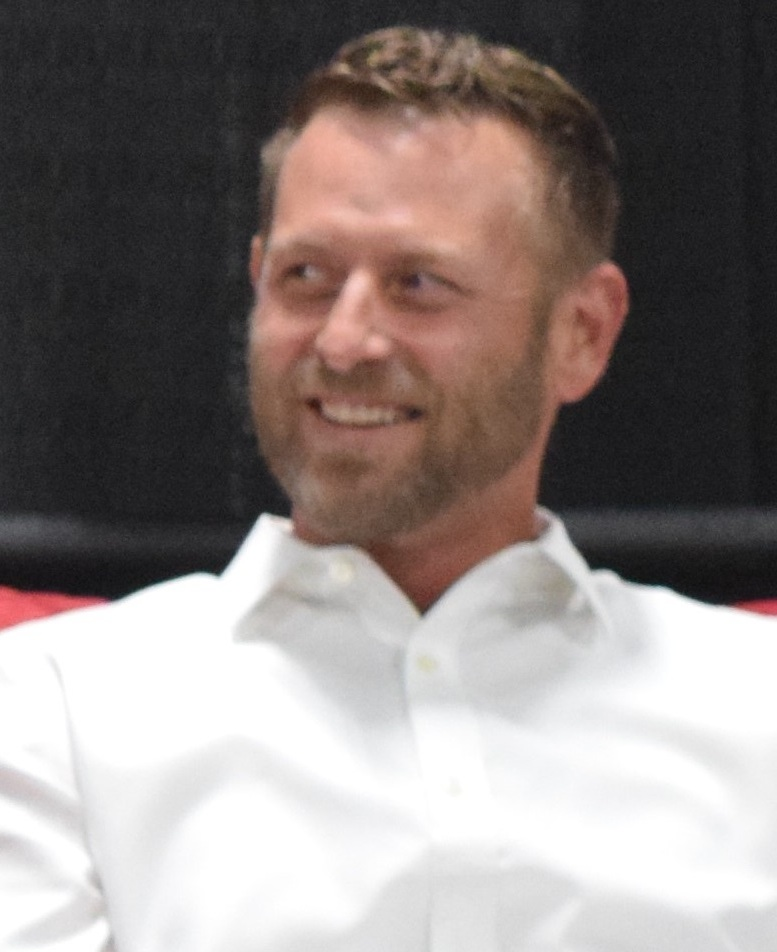
Rob Wiethoff

Clark and Blomquist were cast as Arthur Morgan and Micah Bell, while Davis and Wiethoff reprised their roles as Dutch van der Linde and John Marston from Red Dead Redemption.

The developers often allowed the actors to take scenes in their own direction to develop characters in new ways. The actors formed a close bond during production, which helped with individual performances. Roger Clark took inspiration for his portrayal as Arthur from Toshiro Mifune, whose characters he found stoic while having a "crazy" sense of humor, a complexity he wanted to portray within Arthur. Clark took inspiration from The Proposition (2005) as it involved a similar situation to Arthur's, wherein he is forced to betray some of his loyalties, and watched films such as High Noon (1952) and the work of John Wayne; despite watching the Dollars Trilogy (1964–1966) he did not take much inspiration from Clint Eastwood's portrayal of the Man with No Name as he felt Arthur was more talkative. Clark wanted to portray a character complex enough for the player to choose his path and still make sense; he faced difficulty due to the differences between the two paths but reminded himself that Arthur was a complex character who could easily contradict himself. Clark felt Arthur initially resented John Marston as he had a family—something Arthur envies—but as the gang begins to fall apart, Arthur acts to help John, "try[ing] to do what he wishes he could have done for himself". Clark looked to Rob Wiethoff's portrayal as John in the first game for inspiration with his own performance. Houser avoided meeting Clark on set to limit hearing his real voice.

Benjamin Byron Davis was asked to reprise his role as Dutch in mid-2013. He portrayed Dutch "in his prime"—as a charming, confident man—for about a year before playing the decline of the character. Unsworth felt Dutch views himself not as a criminal, but somebody fighting against a "corrupt system of power that's been set up to divide and suppress". He noted Dutch's "anarchic, anti-establishment rhetoric" was compelling for the gang to remain with him. When developing John Marston, the writers felt his appearance in the first game could be limiting to them since players had already resonated with the character. Wiethoff looked to his own life when returning to the character; he always looked up to his older sister's male friends for approval in the same way that John looks to the rest of the gang for validation. He took inspiration from the "pretty tough dudes" in his home town of Seymour, Indiana for John's personality. Motion capture director Rod Edge described Sadie as "so feminine but so tough"; actress Alex McKenna enjoyed that Sadie was written as Arthur's equal instead of his love interest. Noshir Dalal resonated with Charles Smith, whose father is African American and mother is Native American, as Dalal is half-Japanese and half-Parsi. He drew experiences from his personal life when portraying the character. Gabriel Sloyer felt Javier Escuella is "looking for home, somewhere to belong", feeling torn between grasping at the American Dream and longing for his home in Mexico. Sloyer considered his own father—also named Javier—and his experience with immigrating to the United States. Peter Blomquist described Micah Bell as a "slimy opportunist". He opted to develop the character from scratch instead of taking specific inspiration from others.

== Technical and gameplay development ==
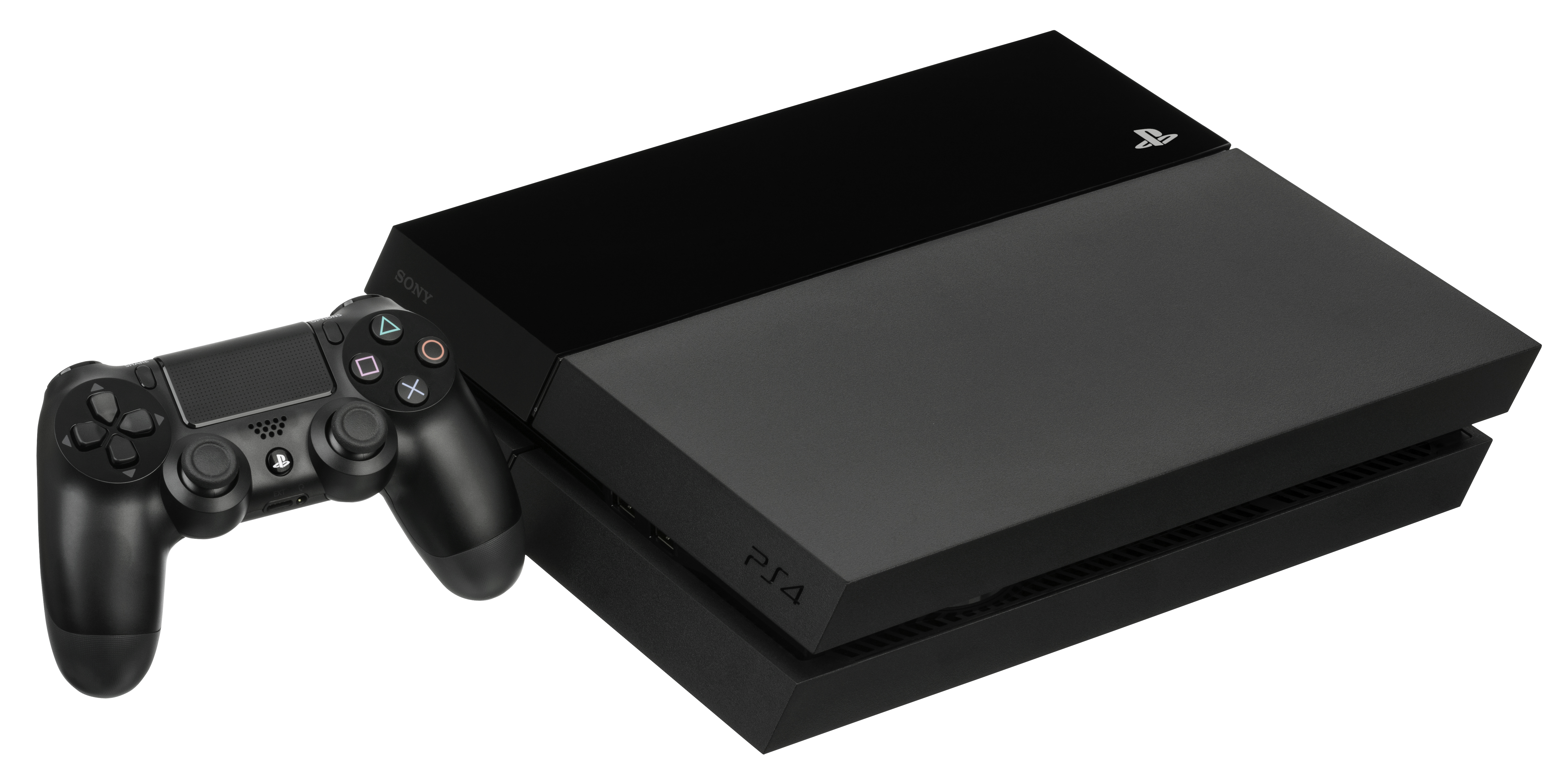
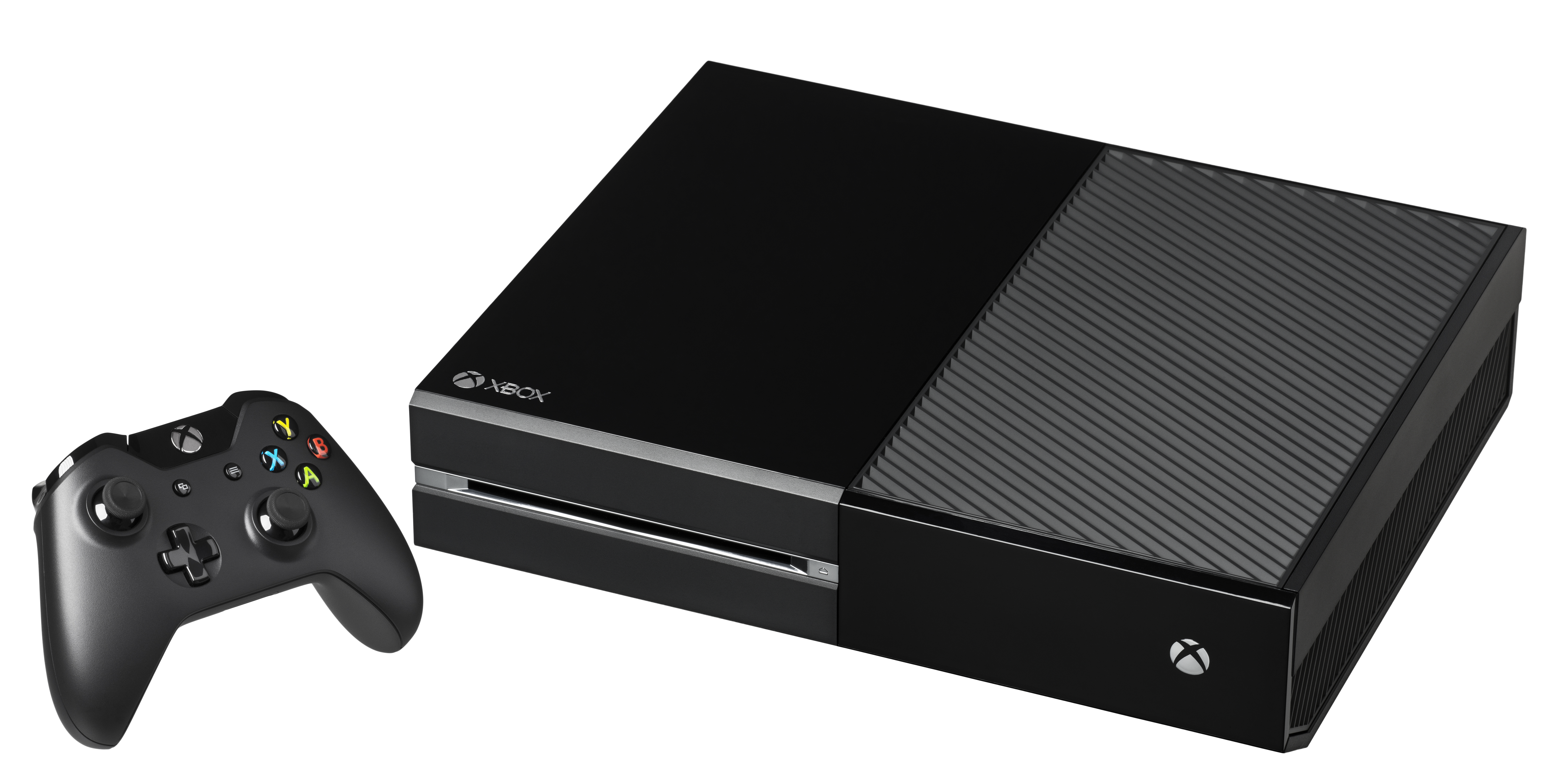
Red Dead Redemption 2 is the first game from Rockstar built specifically for the PlayStation 4 (top) and Xbox One (bottom).

Red Dead Redemption 2 is the first game from Rockstar built specifically for the PlayStation 4 and Xbox One. Rockstar had tested the technical capabilities of the consoles when porting Grand Theft Auto V from the PlayStation 3 and Xbox 360. Once the team defined the limitations, they determined areas requiring focus: according to graphics technical director Alex Hadjadj, "things like a global lighting solution, atmospheric effects, or post processing and presentation". Red Dead Redemption 2 allowed for about 10 times the amount of animations over Grand Theft Auto V due to the additional memory of the consoles. While Grand Theft Auto V required dense crowds in the city streets, Red Dead Redemption 2 demanded populated towns with identifiable characters. Technical director Phil Hooker said the number of animations required for individual character reactions was unlike any previous Rockstar game.

Rockstar overhauled its entire animation system to achieve more believable human and animal behavior on the new generation of consoles. A significant range of animations was added for enemy artificial intelligence to make them appear natural during combat. Subtle animations were emphasized by the developers to make the world feel more believable; Rockstar upgraded its Euphoria physics engine and completely overhauled its AI system for the first time in 17 years. The team paid great attention to the horse animation to ensure the player felt a connection with the animal. They captured footage of real horses in Scotland, used as reference material for animators. The team ensured the horse's artificial intelligence was focused on self-preservation, avoiding obstacles and cliffs during navigation. Senior animator Jason Barnes brought his dog Einstein to the motion capture set each day; he was used to test the motion capture suits for dogs, and ultimately portrayed the gang's stray dog Cain. Barnes noted Einstein's service training meant he was familiar with waiting patiently, making him "perfect" for the role.

One of Rockstar's goals with Red Dead Redemption 2's gameplay was to make the player feel like they inhabit a living world, instead of playing missions and watching cutscenes. A method used to achieve this was the gang's moving camp, where the player can interact with other characters. The team ensured the characters maintained the same personality and mood from cutscene to gameplay to make the world feel more alive and realistic. Unsworth described the camp as "one of the most ambitious things" done by the studio. Rockstar felt the gameplay mechanics allowed the writers to "delve deeper" into the game's characters. A significant part of making the game world feel alive was to create routines for the gang members around camp, including activities and chores they partake in, and times of day they are awake. This was a system previously explored in Grand Theft Auto V, particularly with one of the protagonists' family home, and Houser cites inspiration from Red Dead Redemption's town of Chuparosa, full of characters performing minor tasks. Another method for realism was characters conversing at camp, to which the player can choose to respond; should the player respond frequently, characters will begin to invite their responses in future conversations. The game features a "walk-and-talk system", where characters briefly follow the player and inform them of events in the game world—a system previously transmitted via mobile phone in Grand Theft Auto V. Some missions were deliberately placed to demonstrate Arthur's personality.

The team decided to limit the weapon inventory to a select number of guns to maintain realism; all other owned weapons remain with the player's horse, also serving as a way to increase their bond with the animal. Rockstar avoided too much realism—such as a full skinning animation—so as to not bore the player. Some teams expanded upon the wilderness and survival elements as they had found it a large draw to the original game. When replaying the game throughout development, the team discovered conflict between missions forcing the player to behave poorly and those forcing them to behave well. As a result, they crafted branching scenes and dialogue options based on the player's behavior, which ties into the Honor system. The team considered the idea of the player being able to take camp members to different activities, such as fishing, but ultimately felt it led to more AI-like behavior instead of a realistic tone. Several activities within the game, especially those out of character for Arthur, were stripped back to become optional to the player. Some tasks became optional if they included any opportunity for the player to grow and reflect. The gunplay was revised from Rockstar's previous games to improve the feeling and speed of using the weapons. Late in the game's development, senior staff at Rockstar decided to add letterboxing to the game's cutscenes, requiring more work for cinematics staff and reshoots for the cast.

== Music production ==
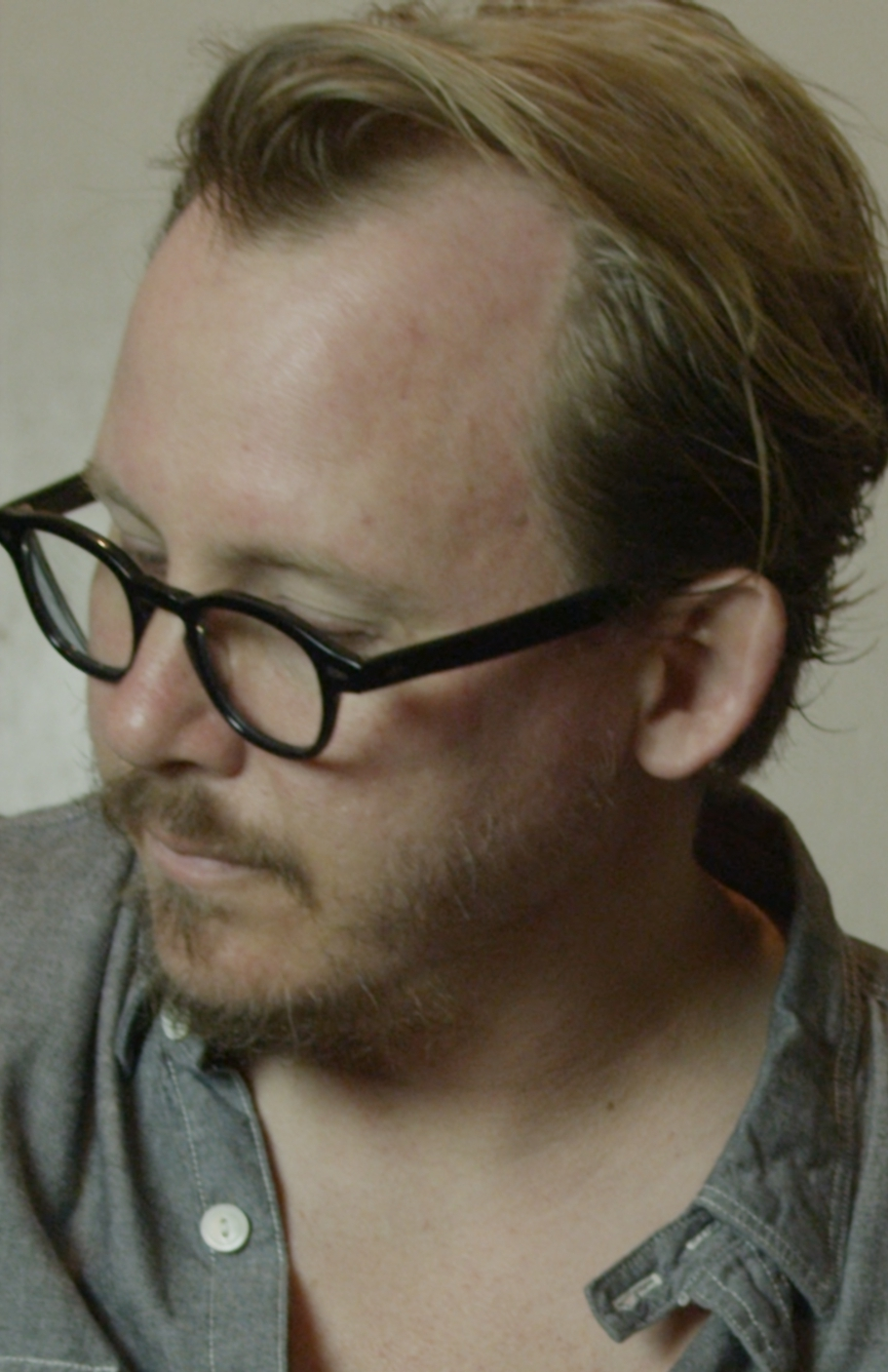
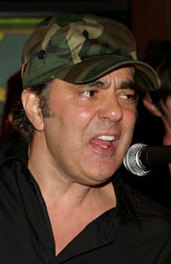
Woody Jackson (left) composed Red Dead Redemption 2's original score, while Daniel Lanois (right) produced the original vocal tracks.

Woody Jackson, who worked with Rockstar on the original game and Grand Theft Auto V, returned to compose Red Dead Redemption 2's original score. He composed roughly 60 hours of music for the game, though not every track made the final product; the game has 192 interactive mission tracks. Ivan Pavlovich, director of music and audio, estimated the player would only hear around one-third of the total music in a standard playthrough. Red Dead Redemption 2 has three types of score: narrative, which is heard during the missions in the story; interactive, when the player is roaming the open world or in multiplayer; and environmental, which includes campfire songs or a character playing music in the world. The music regularly reacts according to the player's decisions in the world, matching the game's atmosphere and the player's choices. Jackson's goal with the ambient music was to accompany the sound design and not become distracting for the player. Comparing the game to a television season, Jackson considered a mission to be like an episode as it tells an individual story arc while maintaining themes across multiple missions.

To ensure his music was effective for the game, Jackson listened to the music while shooting at a target range using a gun from the game's time. He purchased several instruments from the Wrecking Crew that were featured on classic cowboy films, such as Dennis Budimir's 1898 Martin 1–28 gut string and Tommy Tedesco's Harmina Salinas Hijas gut string. He acquired a 1920s Gibson Mandobass used on Bullitt (1968) that recreated an "ominous" bell sound, ukuleles from Butch Cassidy and the Sundance Kid (1969), and a nylon guitar used on Unforgiven (1992). While the first game imitated popular Spaghetti Western film soundtracks, the second game aimed to become more unique. Jackson estimated he changed the music about four times throughout development, from extreme experimentation to classic Western sounds, ultimately blending to make "something different". Jackson found Ennio Morricone's work—particularly on the Dollars Trilogy—was already a departure from typical Western music of the time, instead featuring sounds popular at the time such as "psychedelic guitars, lots of noises", so Jackson felt he could also take such creative liberties with Red Dead Redemption 2. Similarly, he was influenced by Masaru Sato's score on Akira Kurosawa's film Yojimbo (1961), which he felt focused on emotion rather than trying to replicate the sound of feudal Japan, the film's setting.

In total, over 110 musicians worked on the music for the game. Several musicians turned down offers to work on the soundtrack due to their unfamiliarity with the industry and technology. Pavlovich engaged Daniel Lanois to produce the original vocal tracks, wanting a consistent "through-line" to complement Jackson's score. Lanois collaborated with artists such as D'Angelo, Willie Nelson, Rhiannon Giddens, and Josh Homme. Pavlovich felt the diversity of the game's landscapes allowed for more diverse sounds, engaging saxophone player Colin Stetson, experimental band Senyawa, and musician Arca to work on the score. Lanois's co-writer Rocco DeLuca conceived the chant for the songs "Unshaken" and "Crash of Worlds" in New Orleans, based on a proverb by Paramahansa Yogananda: "You must stand unshaken amidst the crash of breaking worlds". Lanois felt that the term applied to the determination of game's characters throughout the story.

== Release ==
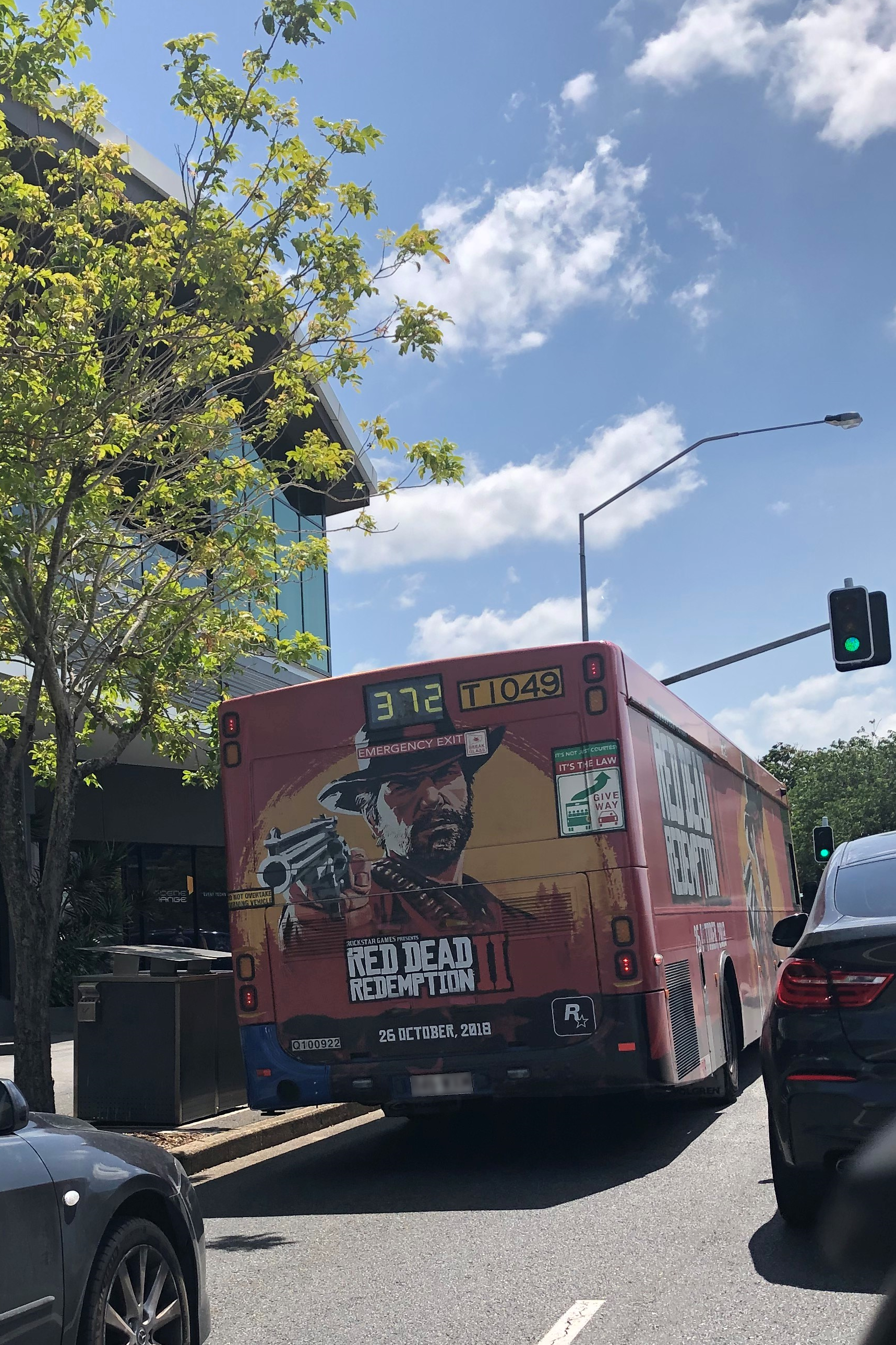
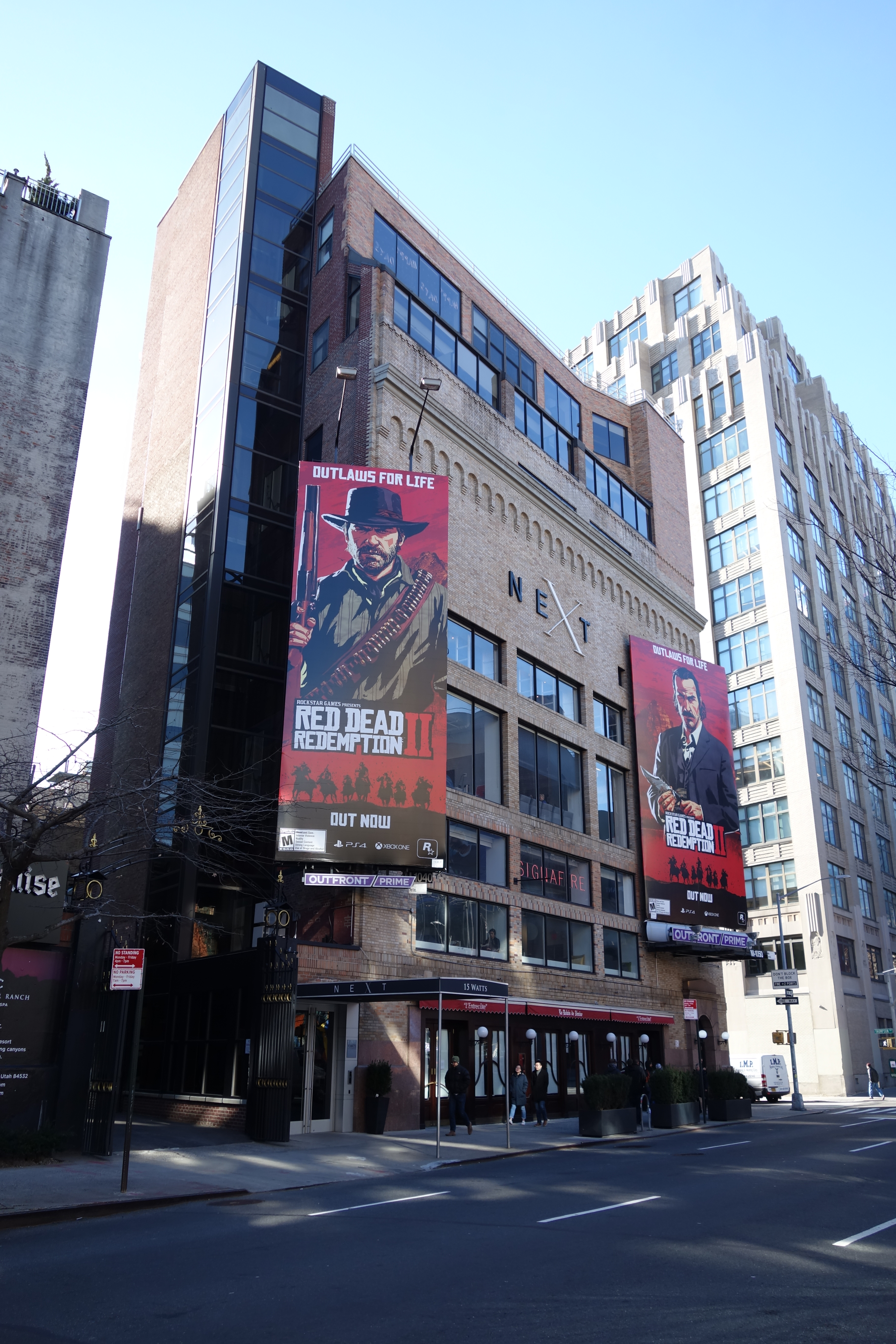
The game was promoted around the world, including in Brisbane (left) and SoHo (right).

Rockstar Games first teased Red Dead Redemption 2 on October 16–17, 2016, releasing two teaser images in the color and theme of Red Dead Redemption to its website and social media platforms. The teaser images led to considerable attention and raised the stock price of Rockstar's parent company Take-Two Interactive by nearly six percent. The game was officially announced on October 18, 2016. On the day of its announcement for PlayStation 4 and Xbox One, some fans started petitioning Rockstar for the game to be made available on Windows as well. The game was delayed three times: before its announcement, an internal delay to the second half of 2017, then publicly to the first half of 2018, and later to October 26, 2018. According to Rockstar, the game required extra development time for "polish". In October 2019, Rockstar announced the game would release for Windows on November 5, 2019, and would be a launch title for Stadia when the service launched in November 2019. The Windows version has visual and technical improvements. It featured new bounties, weapons and hideouts, which were released on PlayStation 4 in December 2019 and Xbox One in January 2020. Google reportedly paid tens of millions of dollars for the game to be ported to Stadia.

== Promotion ==
The game's debut trailer was released on October 20, 2016, depicting the open world environment, and the second and third trailers—released on September 28, 2017, and May 2, 2018, respectively—introduced the game's characters and story. A trailer released on August 9 features the first gameplay footage, demonstrating the shooting and horse mechanics, and the ability to maintain the player's gang and camps. A second gameplay trailer, released on October 1, 2018, demonstrated the in-game heists and Dead Eye targeting system. The final pre-launch trailer was released on October 18, 2018, intended to be a television advertisement. Houser noted the team often edits several hundred versions of the trailer, based on suggestions from other teams. A trailer for the Windows version was released on October 17, 2019, demonstrating the updated 4K resolution gameplay at 60 frames per second.

To spur pre-order sales, Rockstar collaborated with several retail outlets to provide special edition versions of the game. The "Special Edition" includes exclusive single-player content, while the "Ultimate Edition" features additional content for Red Dead Online. The "Collector's Box" is a collection of physical merchandise relating to the game. Players could earn the stone hatchet in the game by acquiring it through a mission in Grand Theft Auto Online. Rockstar updated the official Red Dead Redemption 2 website in the months prior to release to show a preview of activities and locales within the open world, and an examination of the stories of the Van der Linde gang members. Merchandise was released for the game prior to the release, including clothing matching the in-game characters, and some with the game's logo. A companion app, released alongside the game for Android and iOS devices, acts as a second screen wherein the player can view in-game items such as catalogs, journals, and a real-time mini-map.
