= Music of Red Dead Redemption 2 =

Music in the 2018 action-adventure game Red Dead Redemption 2

The music for the 2018 action-adventure game Red Dead Redemption 2, developed and published by Rockstar Games, consists of an original score composed by musician Woody Jackson and an original soundtrack produced by Daniel Lanois. The soundtrack album was released digitally in July 2019, consisting of vocal tracks with artists such as Willie Nelson, Rhiannon Giddens, and Josh Homme, followed by the score album in August, featuring Jackson's original work and collaborations with artists like Colin Stetson, Senyawa, and Arca. An extended play of original songs by David Ferguson and Matt Sweeney, The Housebuilding EP, was released in February 2021. Several singles were released, including D'Angelo's "Unshaken" in 2019 and Christone "Kingfish" Ingram's Red Dead Online track "Letter from Bluewater Man" in 2021.

Red Dead Redemption 2 has three different types of score: narrative, which is heard during the missions in the game's story; interactive, when the player is roaming the open world or in multiplayer; and environmental, which includes campfire singing songs or a character playing music in the world. The game's music regularly reacts according to the player's decisions in the world. Jackson composed roughly 60 hours of music for the game, though not every track made the final product. He purchased several instruments from the Wrecking Crew that were featured on classic cowboy films. Lanois was chosen to produce all of the game's vocal tracks for consistency and to complement Jackson's score. In total, over 110 musicians worked on the music.

Critical reception to the soundtracks was positive, as reviewers felt that the music connected appropriately with the gameplay. In particular, critics felt that the minimalist approach of the score's composition matched the gameplay, genre, and time, and the vocal tracks were praised for their impactfulness. The game's music was nominated for numerous awards, and several critics named it among the best video game soundtracks for its authenticity to the environment and assistance in its worldbuilding. Some tracks became popular and spawned cover versions and live performances, and the original soundtrack and "Unshaken" achieved success on the Billboard charts.

== Production and composition ==
=== Instrumental score ===
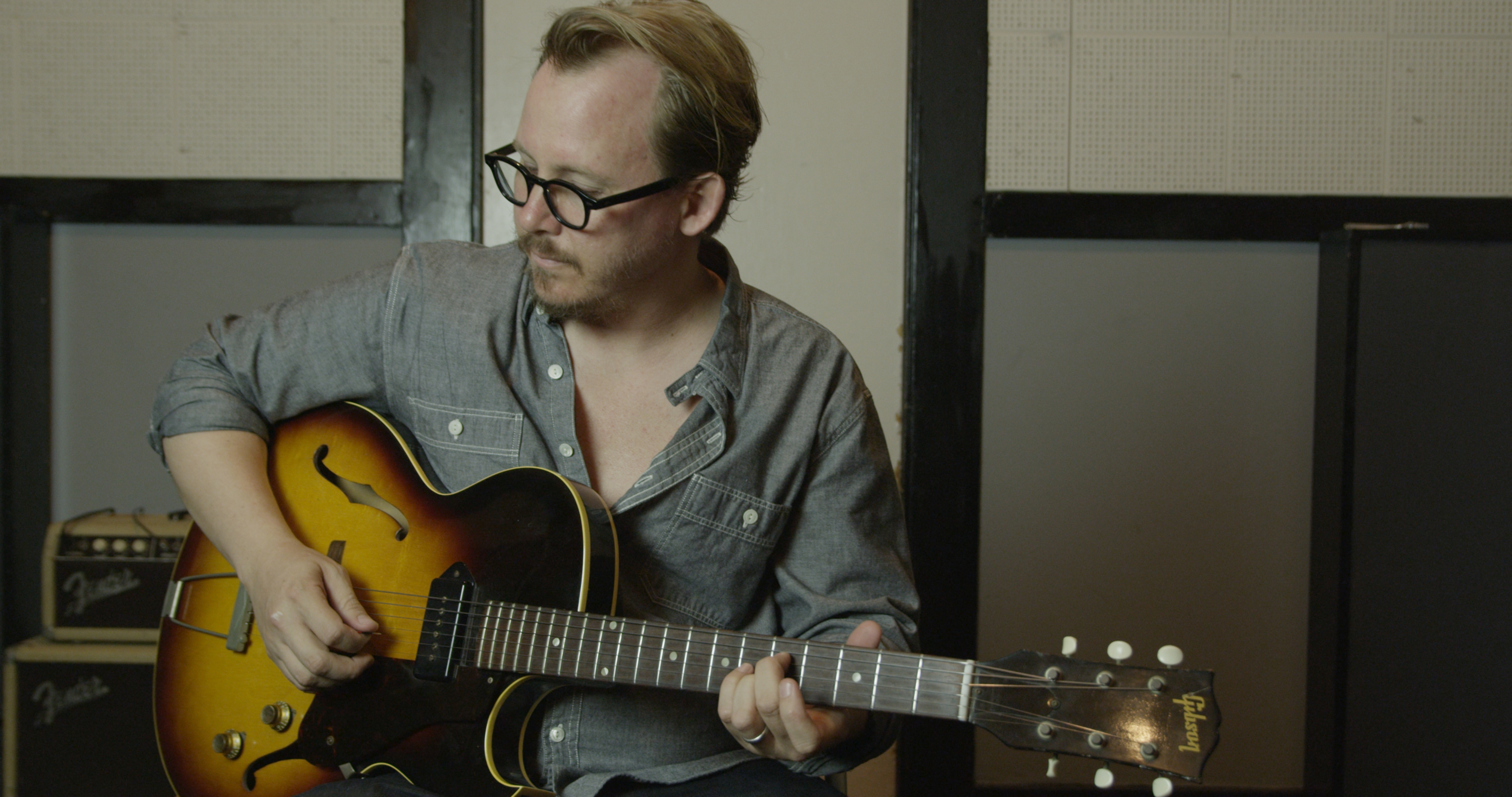
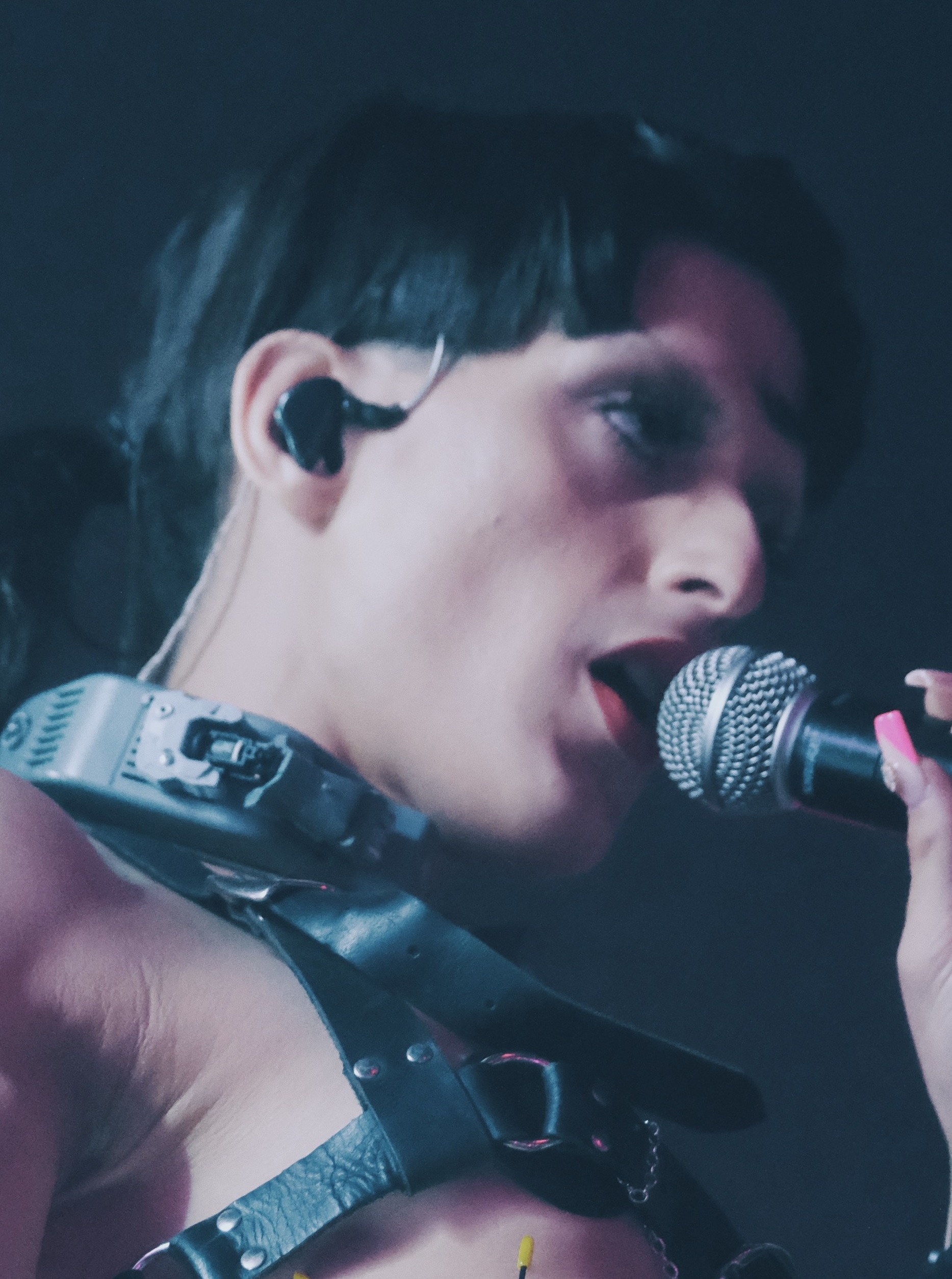
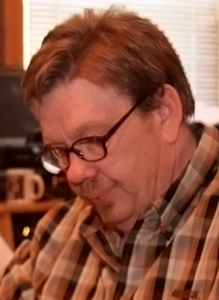
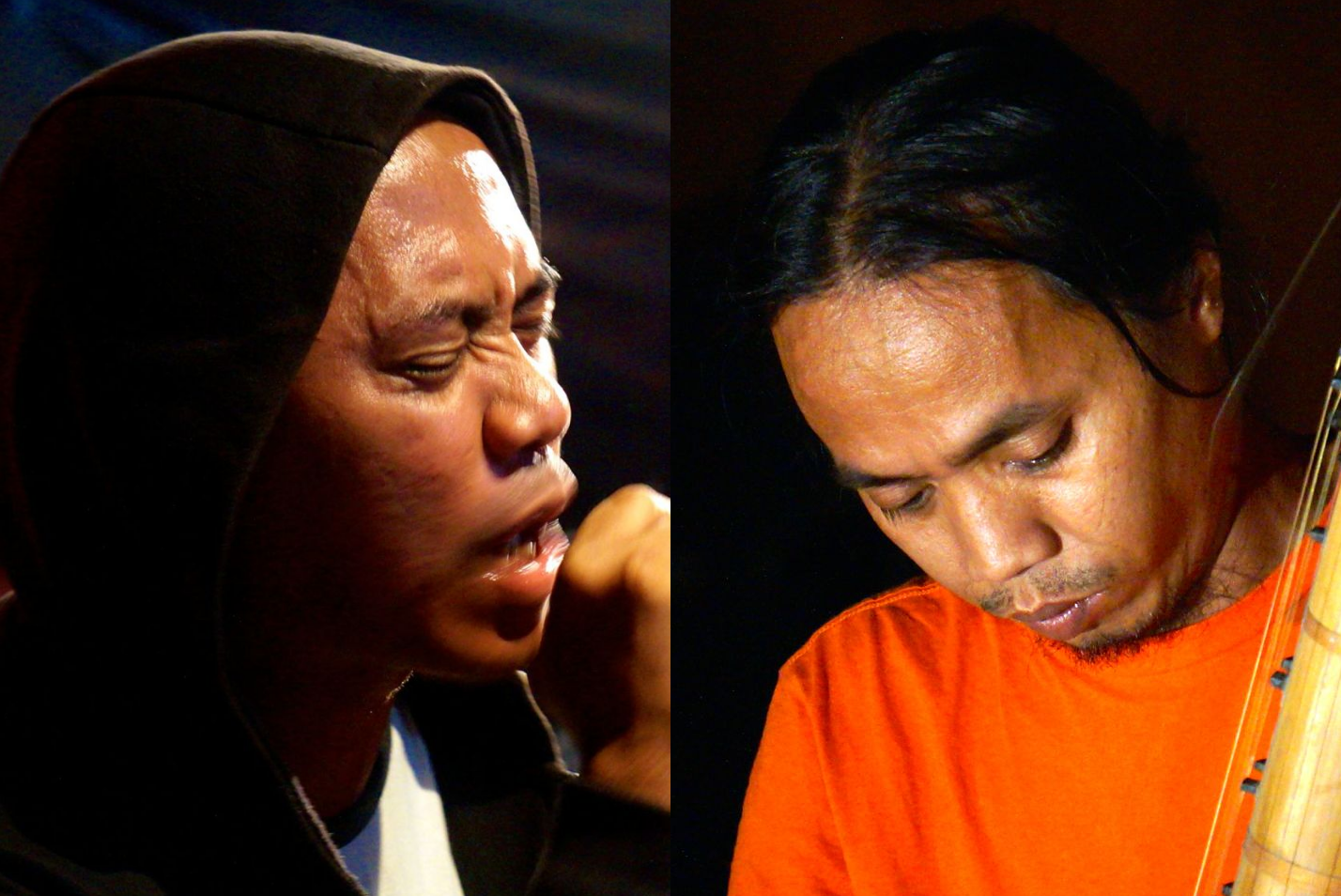
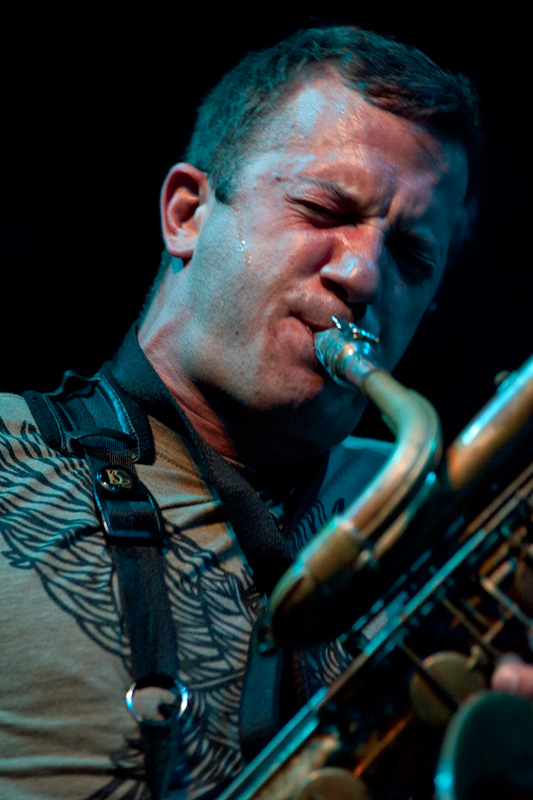
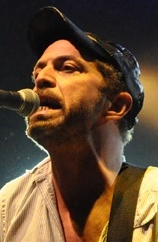
Woody Jackson (top) returned to compose Red Dead Redemption 2's original score, collaborating with artists like (bottom, L to R) Arca, David Ferguson, Senyawa, Colin Stetson, and Matt Sweeney.

Woody Jackson, who worked with developer and publisher Rockstar Games on Red Dead Redemption (2010) and Grand Theft Auto V (2013), returned to compose Red Dead Redemption 2's original score. Discussions about the game's music began early in development, as the team felt that it helped to create atmosphere and tone. Jackson composed roughly 60 hours of music for the game, but not every track made the final product; the game has 192 interactive mission tracks. Ivan Pavlovich, director of music and audio, estimated that the player would only hear around one-third of the total music created for the game in a standard playthrough. Red Dead Redemption 2 has three different types of score: narrative, which is heard during the missions in the game's story; interactive, when the player is roaming the open world or in multiplayer; and environmental, which includes campfire singing songs or a character playing music in the world. The game's music regularly reacts according to the player's decisions in the world, matching the game's atmosphere and the player's choices.

Jackson compared the beginning of the scoring process to that of a film, as he worked with the game's linear cutscenes. As the process progressed, it became less like a film; he would record 11 stem loops of around 4–5 minutes, which change in the game based on the changing of emotions. This change is initiated in the game's engine by an artificial intelligence system internally named the "Gunfight Conductor", which alters and creates additional sounds for variation. This system was introduced in Rockstar's previous game, Grand Theft Auto V, but received an overhaul for Red Dead Redemption 2; it is similarly used in the game's multiplayer counterpart, Red Dead Online. Jackson's goal with the ambient music was for it to accompany the game's sound design and not become distracting for the player. Comparing the game to a television season, Jackson considered a mission to be like an episode, as it tells an individual story arc while maintaining the same themes across multiple missions. For the narrative music, Jackson maintained the same tempo and key to avoid any clutter. At one point during development, he used around 15 stems, but ultimately brought it back to around six.

To ensure that his music was effective for the game, Jackson listened to the music while shooting at a target range using a gun from the game's time. He also purchased several instruments from the Wrecking Crew that were featured on classic cowboy films, such as Dennis Budimir's 1898 Martin 1–28 gut string and Tommy Tedesco's Harmina Salinas Hijas gut string. He also acquired a 1920s Gibson Mandobass used on Bullitt (1968) that recreated an "ominous" bell sound, ukuleles from Butch Cassidy and the Sundance Kid (1969), and a nylon guitar used on Unforgiven (1992). During recording, Jackson played cues to each musician using call and response, to which they would respond organically, either copying Jackson's cue or playing how they feel. This system took place over a few days, and the tracks make up most of the open-world music. Several recording tools were used to capture the music, dating from a 1959 8-track tape to the modern digital workstation Pro Tools. When creating the score, Jackson gathered musician friends like bassist Mike Watt, violinist Petra Haden, and drummer Jon Theodore for jam sessions, often using Jackson's old instruments.

While the first game imitated popular Spaghetti Western film soundtracks, the second game aimed to become more unique. Jackson estimated that he changed the music about four times throughout development, from extreme experimentation to classic Western sounds, ultimately blending to make "something different". Pavlovich felt that in order to find an effective result, they had to "push it almost until you break it, and then you swing back". To avoid imitating the bell used in Spaghetti Western soundtracks, Jackson instead used a mandolin used by the Wrecking Crew. The music team found reference points in Willie Nelson's album Teatro (1998) and the soundtrack for the 1971 film The Hired Hand. While researching for the game's score, Jackson found that Ennio Morricone's work—particularly on Sergio Leone's Dollars Trilogy (1964–1966)—was already a departure from typical Western music of the time, instead featuring sounds popular at the time such as "psychedelic guitars, lots of noises", so Jackson felt that he could also take such creative liberties with Red Dead Redemption 2. Similarly, he was even more influenced by Masaru Sato's score on Akira Kurosawa's film Yojimbo (1961), which he felt focused on emotion rather than trying to replicate the sound of feudal Japan, the film's setting.

Guitarist Matt Sweeney was first approached to work on the game while intoxicated at Max Fish Bar in New York in around 2016 or 2017 by Rockstar's music supervisor Tony Mesones. He was asked to create "Appalachian sounding music" for the game's smaller, character-focused missions. When Sweeney discovered the game's setting, he recommended that Rockstar engage David R. Ferguson to create music with him due to Ferguson's extensive experience with hillbilly music. Pavlovich and Mesones visited Sweeney and Ferguson at the Butcher Shoppe Recording Studio in Nashville to show them videos of the game and discuss the characters. Ferguson recalled that Rockstar wanted to avoid blues music in the game. He noted the differences between his typical work and his work on the game, noting that he avoided percussion so players would not confuse it with in-game sound effects. Ferguson provided Rockstar with traditional instruments; one of his colleagues, Leroy Troy, possesses a "percussion rig with bells and whistles" that was used for one of the songs, "A Quiet Time". Sweeney took inspiration from segments of other music—such as the insistent drums in the work of Morricone—without being derivative; he was partly inspired by Bruce Langhorne's work on the soundtrack for The Hired Hand (1971). Sweeney and Ferguson estimated that they created around 100 small pieces of music for the game.

In total, over 110 musicians worked on the music for the game. Sweeney noted that several musicians turned down offers to work on the soundtrack, due to their unfamiliarity with the industry and technology. Pavlovich felt that the diversity of the game's landscapes allowed for more diverse sounds, engaging saxophone player Colin Stetson, experimental band Senyawa, and musician Arca to work on the score. While Pavlovich felt that Arca's work was "too angular or sharp or modern sounding", he found techniques to subtly add it to the game to separate it from the Spaghetti Western sounds. For the arrangement of the traditional songs in the game, Rockstar engaged historic music producer Eli Smith, who fit the songs to the game and worked with the actors to perform them.

=== Vocal tracks ===
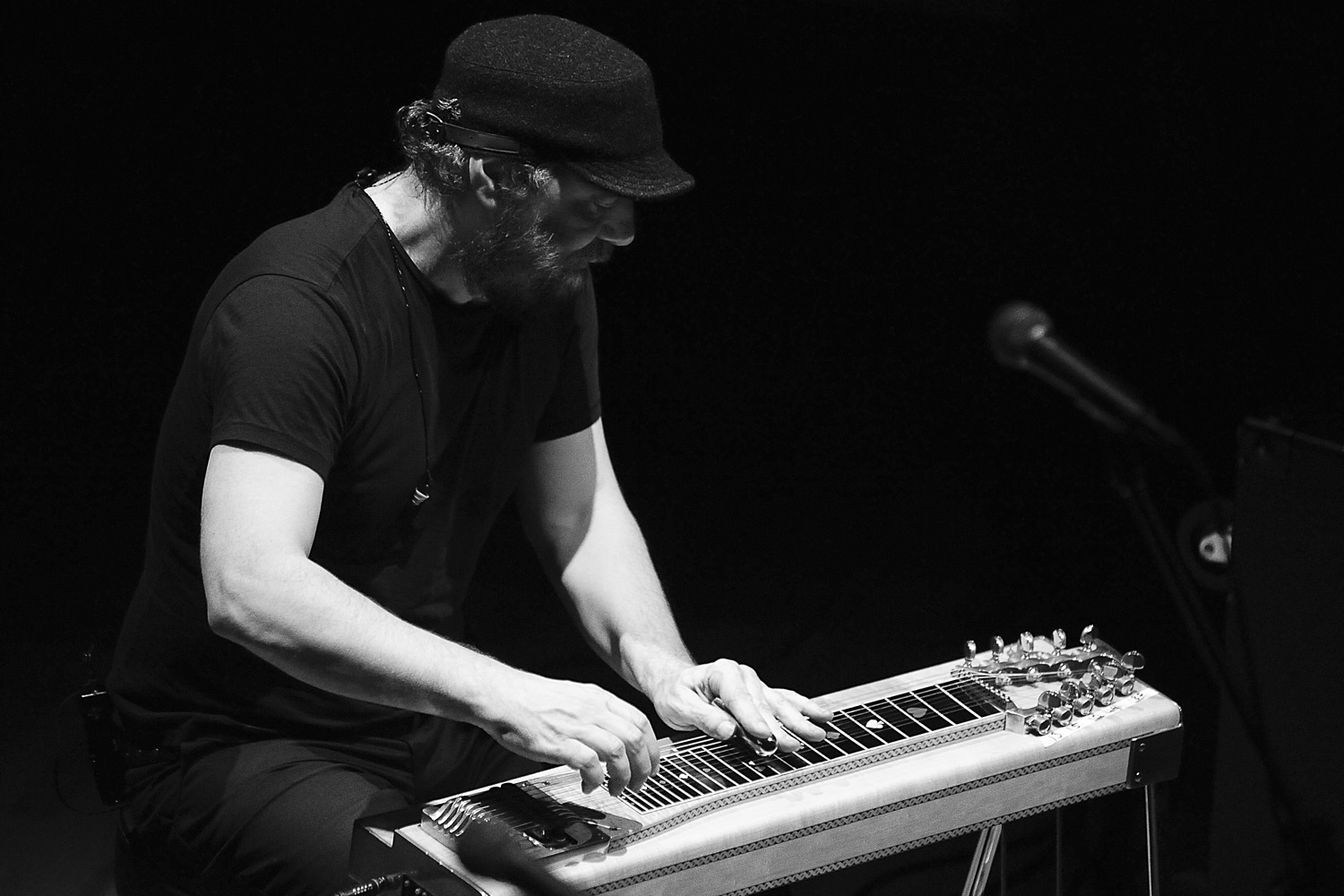
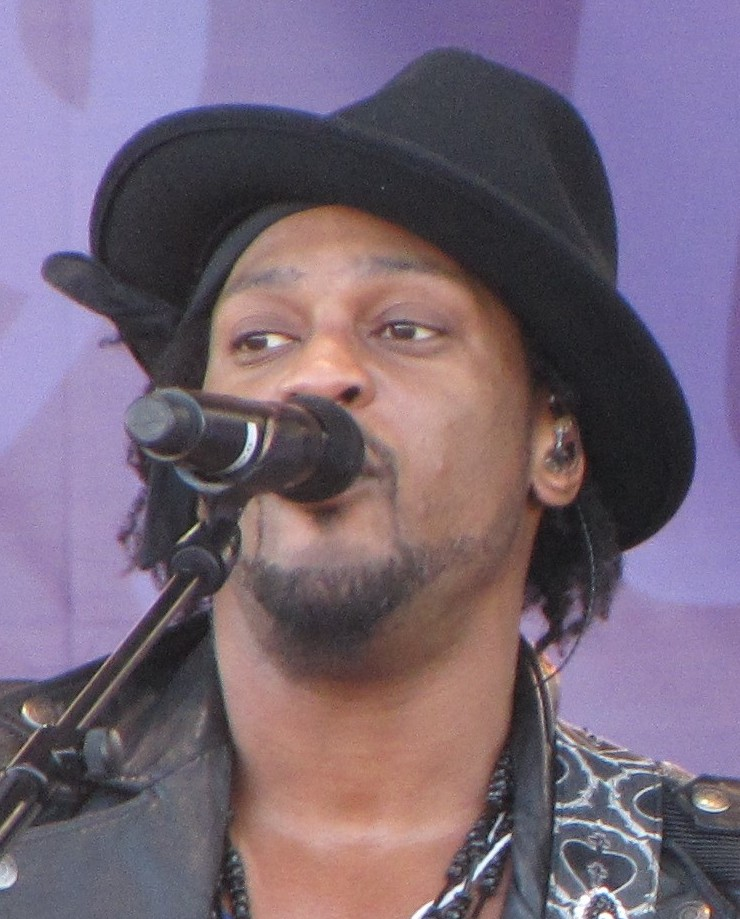
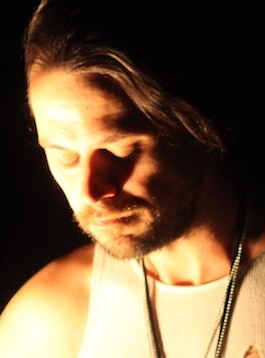
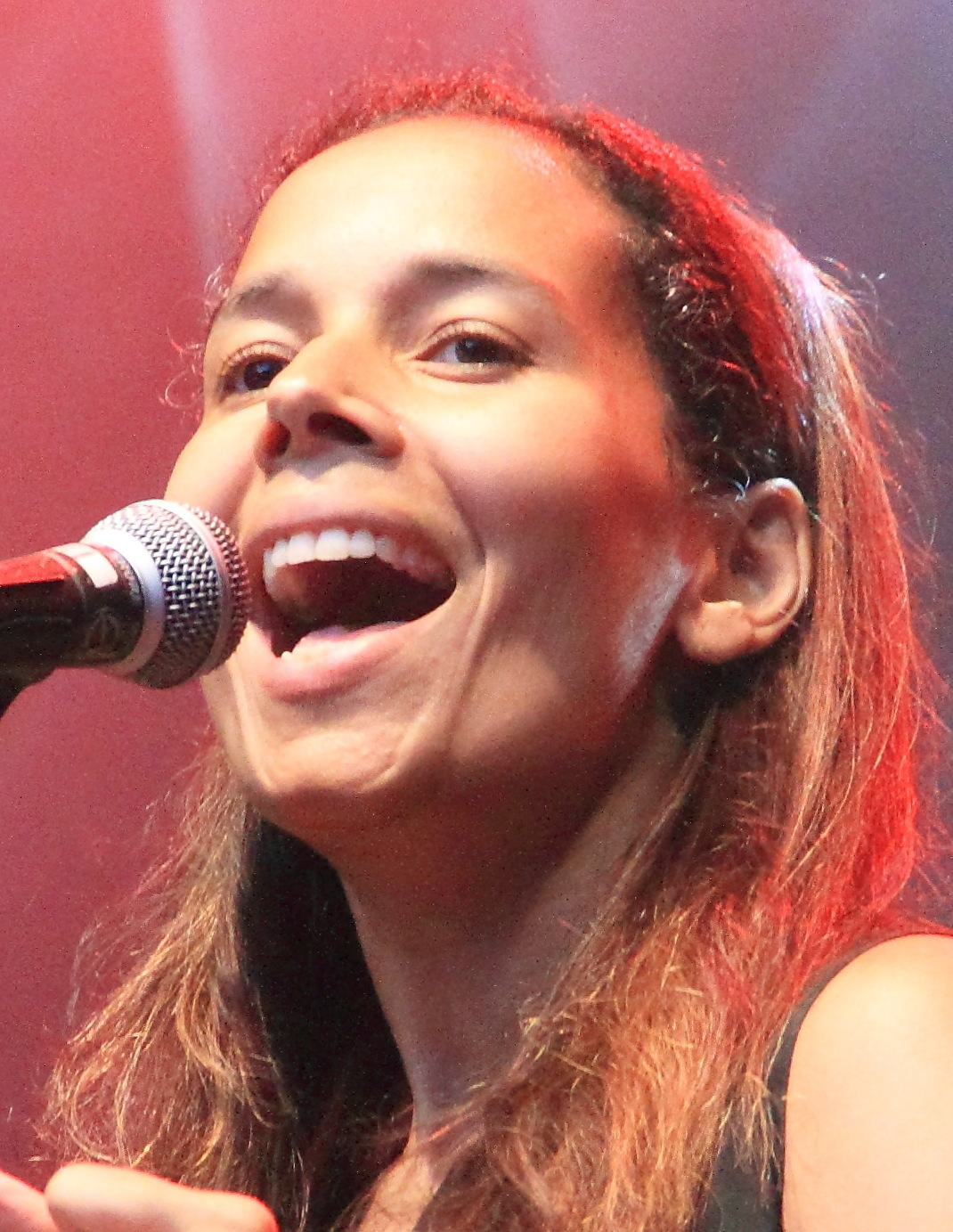
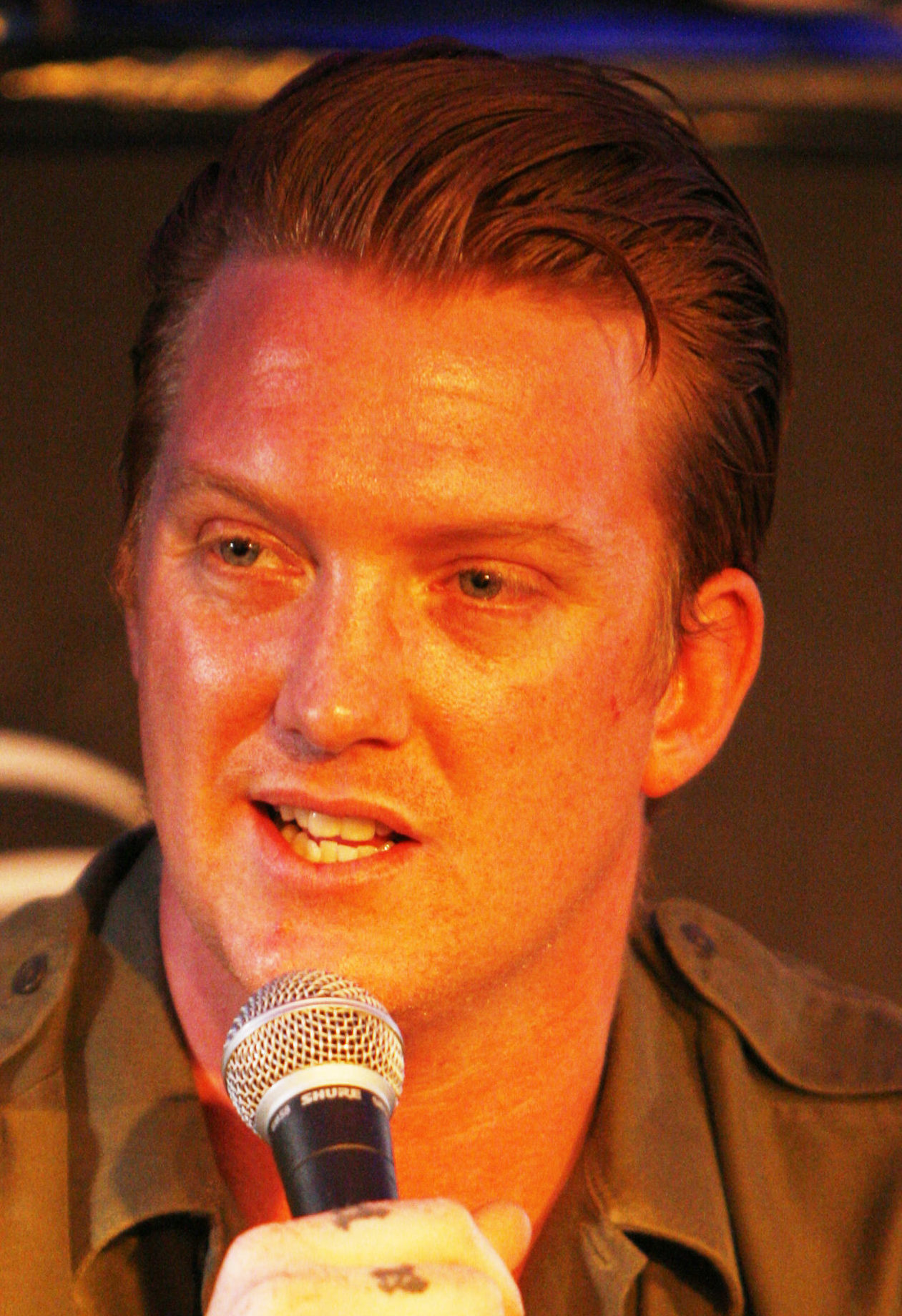
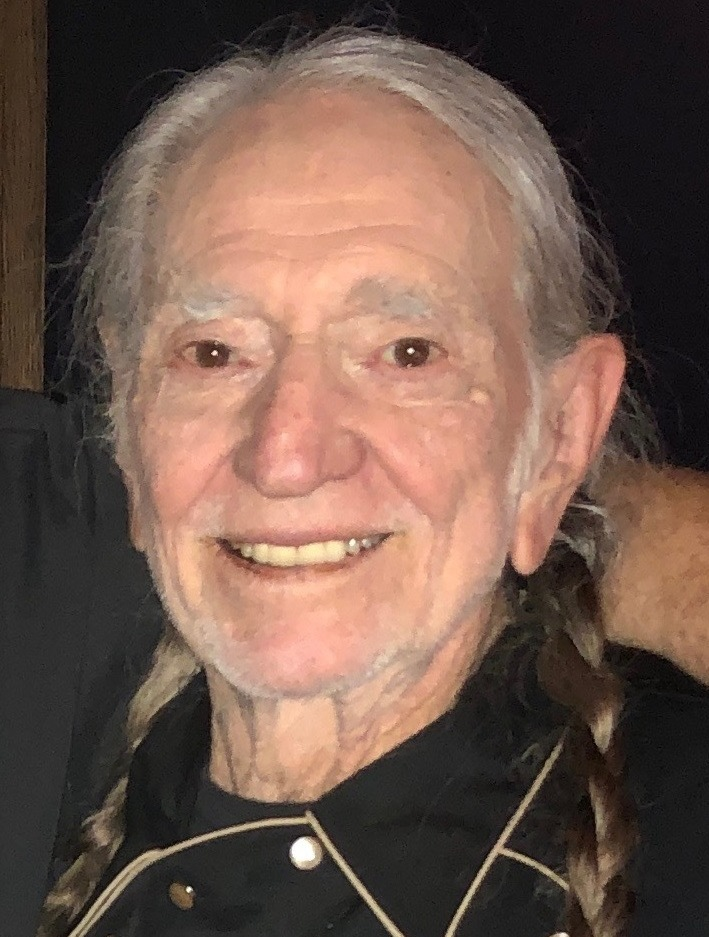
Daniel Lanois (top) produced the original vocal tracks, engaging artists and musicians like (bottom, L to R) D'Angelo, Rocco DeLuca, Rhiannon Giddens, Josh Homme, and Willie Nelson.

Pavlovich engaged Daniel Lanois to produce all of the game's original vocal tracks, wanting a consistent "through-line" to complement Jackson's score. Lanois collaborated with artists such as D'Angelo, Willie Nelson, Rhiannon Giddens, and Josh Homme. Lanois wrote the song "Cruel World" specifically for Nelson. When a hurricane prevented Nelson from recording the song, the team sent the track to Homme in the hopes that he could record it in time for the game's release; Homme recorded his vocals in an Australian studio while on tour. Nelson was ultimately able to record the song in time in Los Angeles; the team considered combining both versions into a duet, but ultimately included both versions in the game.

"Unshaken"
A 23-second sample of the chorus of "Unshaken". The chant for the song is based on a proverb by Paramahansa Yogananda: "You must stand unshaken amidst the crash of breaking worlds".

D'Angelo had played the game at Rockstar's offices in New York City before agreeing to work on the game; his apparent enthusiasm in the title prompted Pavlovich to invite him to work on music. Pavlovich felt that D'Angelo's involvement in the game led to Lanois's engagement with the project. Lanois's co-writer Rocco DeLuca conceived the chant for the songs "Unshaken" and "Crash of Worlds" in New Orleans, based on a proverb by Paramahansa Yogananda: "You must stand unshaken amidst the crash of breaking worlds". Lanois felt that the term applied to the determination of game's characters throughout the story.

Lanois took an early version of the song to D'Angelo in New York; they added a percussion track with Brian Blade on drums and Cyril Neville on cowbell, while Lanois played guitar and D'Angelo played Rhodes piano, and turned it into a full song. The recording process with D'Angelo took around a week and a half. Lanois and D'Angelo originally began working on a rock-oriented song in a 6/8 time signature, but "it didn't pan out". Nas also recorded a version of "Unshaken" with rap verses. Lanois felt that the darker tones of "Love Come Back" resonated well with the game, despite only featuring musical instruments that did not exist in the game's time; he also recorded an acoustic version with more accurate instruments. "That's the Way It Is" was written with the theme of acceptance and surrender, which Lanois felt resonated with protagonist Arthur Morgan's stillness towards the game's conclusion as he is questioning life.

== Albums ==
=== Original Soundtrack ===
The Music of Red Dead Redemption 2 (Original Soundtrack)

Soundtrack album
- Released: July 12, 2019
- Studios: Le Noise, Los Angeles; Southern Ground, Nashville; Esplanade, New Orleans; Electric Garden, New York
- Genre: Soundtrack
- Length: 42:28
- Labels: Lakeshore; Rockstar Games
- Producers: Ivan Pavlovich; Daniel Lanois

Singles from The Music of Red Dead Redemption 2 (Original Soundtrack)
- 1. "Unshaken" Released: January 4, 2019

The Music of Red Dead Redemption 2 (Original Soundtrack) comprises the original songs created for Red Dead Redemption 2. Produced by Daniel Lanois, the soundtrack includes songs from D'Angelo, Willie Nelson, Rhiannon Giddens, and Josh Homme. The album was released by Lakeshore Records and Rockstar Games digitally on July 12, 2019, and as a CD and vinyl record on September 20, 2019. Rockstar announced the album's title and track listing on June 14, 2019, when pre-orders became available. Pre-orders granted immediate access to two singles from the soundtrack: "Crash of Worlds" and "Table Top". An additional song by David Ferguson was originally due for inclusion on the album.

The soundtrack was positively received. Graham Banas of Push Square wrote that the vocal tracks "create relaxing, melancholic moments". In the context of the game, Dave Thier of Forbes praised the tracks for having as powerful an impact as in Red Dead Redemption. Game Informer's Jason Guisao found that "Mountain Hymn" echoes the "transience of life and innocence in [the game's] violent American frontier"; Push Square's Banas similarly praised the track, describing it as "one of the most beautiful melodies ever created". The soundtrack album peaked at 45 on the Billboard Top Album Sales, 21 on the Soundtracks charts, 15 on Vinyl Albums, 12 on Independent Albums, and 11 on Digital Albums. At the Hollywood Music in Media Awards, the soundtrack won Best Soundtrack Album and "That's the Way It Is" was nominated for Original Song in a Video Game.

Digital and CD track listing
No.	Title	Writer(s)	Artist(s)	Length
1.	"Unshaken"	Daniel Lanois, Rocco DeLuca, Michael Eugene Archer	D'Angelo	3:53
2.	"Moonlight"	Lanois	Lanois, Daryl Johnson, Joseph Maize, Darryl Hatcher, Rhiannon Giddens	3:47
3.	"That's the Way It Is"	Lanois, DeLuca	Lanois	4:08
4.	"Mountain Finale"	Lanois	Lanois	2:54
5.	"Crash of Worlds"	DeLuca	DeLuca	1:46
6.	"Cruel World"	Lanois	Willie Nelson	2:28
7.	"Red"	Lanois	Lanois	2:15
8.	"Mountain Hymn"	Lanois, Giddens	Giddens	3:58
9.	"Mountain Banjo"	Lanois, Giddens	Giddens	2:41
10.	"Table Top"	Lanois	Lanois	4:05
11.	"Love Come Back"	Lanois	Lanois	3:43
12.	"Oh My Lovely"	Lanois	Lanois	3:12
13.	"Cruel World"	Lanois	Josh Homme	3:38
Total length:				42:28

The vinyl release of the album, produced by Tony Giles, split it into four sides across two records.

Vinyl track listing Side A
No.	Title	Writer(s)	Artist(s)	Length
1.	"Unshaken"	Lanois, DeLuca, Archer	D'Angelo	3:53
2.	"Moonlight"	Lanois	Lanois, Johnson, Maize, Hatcher, Giddens	3:47
3.	"That's the Way It Is"	Lanois, DeLuca	Lanois	4:08

Side B
No.	Title	Writer(s)	Artist(s)	Length
4.	"Mountain Finale"	Lanois	Lanois	2:54
5.	"Crash of Worlds"	DeLuca	DeLuca	1:46
6.	"Cruel World"	Lanois	Nelson	2:28
7.	"Red"	Lanois	Lanois	2:15

Side C
No.	Title	Writer(s)	Artist(s)	Length
8.	"Mountain Hymn"	Lanois, Giddens	Giddens	3:58
9.	"Mountain Banjo"	Lanois, Giddens	Giddens	2:41
10.	"Table Top"	Lanois	Lanois	4:05

Side D
No.	Title	Writer(s)	Artist(s)	Length
11.	"Love Come Back"	Lanois	Lanois	3:43
12.	"Oh My Lovely"	Lanois	Lanois	3:12
13.	"Cruel World"	Lanois	Homme	3:38
Total length:				42:28

=== Original Score ===
The Music of Red Dead Redemption 2 (Original Score)

Soundtrack album by Woody Jackson
- Released: August 9, 2019
- Studios: Electro-Vox, Los Angeles
- Genre: Soundtrack
- Length: 73:50
- Labels: Lakeshore; Rockstar Games
- Producers: Ivan Pavlovich; Woody Jackson

Singles from The Music of Red Dead Redemption 2 (Original Score)
- 1. "Outlaws From the West" Released: July 19, 2019; 2. "Fleeting Joy" Released: July 19, 2019; 3. "Country Pursuits" Released: July 19, 2019

The Music of Red Dead Redemption 2 (Original Score) comprises the original score created for Red Dead Redemption 2 by Woody Jackson. It was recorded at Jackson's Electro-Vox Recording Studios in Los Angeles and mastered at DNA Mastering in Glendale, California. The soundtrack features additional production and arrangement by Jeff Silverman, and musical score and orchestration by Colin Stetson, David Ferguson, David Ralicke, Gabe Witcher, Luke O'Malley, Mario Batkovic, Matt Sweeney, Rabih Beaini, and Senyawa. Over 110 other musicians also contributed to the tracks, including Arca, Duane Eddy, Jon Theodore, and Michael Shuman.

Pre-orders for the album became available on July 19, 2019, following Rockstar's announcement of the album's title and track listing. Pre-orders granted immediate access to three singles from the soundtrack: "Outlaws From the West", "Fleeting Joy", and "Country Pursuits". The album was released by Lakeshore Records and Rockstar Games digitally on August 9, 2019. CD and vinyl record versions of the album were released on Record Store Day on April 10, 2020, in a collaboration between Rockstar, Lakeshore, and Invada Records. Michael Walters of TheGamer praised the progression of the soundtrack's track listing, finding it representative of the game's narrative experience; he named "Revenge is a Dish Best Eaten" the strongest track, lauding the growing tension and eventual clash of the horn and strings, comparing them to the characters Dutch van der Linde and Angelo Bronte, respectively.

In the context of the game, Jackson's musical score was described as "top notch" by IGN's Luke Reilly, who described it as "an evocative mix of jangling Ennio Morricone-esque guitar and more soulful pieces"; Push Square's Banas wrote that it adds "a sense of tension and action that you can only get from a western". GamesRadar+'s David Meikleham wrote that the score is "both electrifying and eclectic". Dean Takahashi of VentureBeat felt that the soundtrack contributed significantly to the game's immersion, while Matt Bertz of Game Informer noted that the soundtrack added authenticity to the game world by using elements of American folk music. VG247's Kirk McKeand praised the blending of music during exploration and its intensity in combat, and lauded the sparing use of vocal tracks to highlight important narrative moments. Game Informer's Guisao wrote that he preferred the "couplet" of the songs "American Venom" and "American Reprise" over the game's vocal tracks.

Digital and CD track listing
No.	Title	Writer(s)	Length
1.	"By 1899, The Age of Outlaws and Gunslingers Was At An End"	Woody Jackson, Jeff Silverman, Luke O'Malley	1:28
2.	"Outlaws From the West"	Jackson	4:56
3.	"Blessed Are the Peacemakers"	Jackson	3:41
4.	"Mrs. Sadie Adler, Widow"	Jackson	4:24
5.	"Revenge is a Dish Best Eaten"	Jackson, Mario Batkovic, Boris Klecic, Silverman	4:51
6.	"It All Makes Sense Now"	Jackson	4:09
7.	"The Fine Art of Conversation"	Jackson	2:41
8.	"Banking, The Old American Art"	Michael Leonhart, Jackson	4:32
9.	"There She Is... A Real City, The Future"	Batkovic	0:36
10.	"Everybody Wake Up"	Jackson	1:47
11.	"Welcome to the New World"	Senyawa, Rabih Beaini	4:33
12.	"Paradise Mercifully Departed"	Senyawa, Beaini	2:33
13.	"Doctor's Opinion"	Colin Stetson	0:58
14.	"Fleeting Joy"	Stetson, Jackson	3:44
15.	"Icarus and Friends"	Stetson, Silverman, David Ralicke	3:29
16.	"Country Pursuits"	Jackson, Alejandra Ghersi	2:26
17.	"An American Pastoral Scene"	Jackson	3:47
18.	"Blood Feuds, Ancient and Modern"	Jackson	7:15
19.	"Red Dead Redemption"	Jackson, Daniel Lanois	3:37
20.	"The Wheel"	Jackson	3:53
21.	"American Venom"	Jackson, Bill Elm	2:52
22.	"American Reprise"	Jackson, Elm	0:38
Total length:			73:50

The vinyl release of the album, produced by Giles, reordered the track listing and split two of the songs into two parts, increasing the track numbering from 22 to 24.

Vinyl track listing Side A
No.	Title	Writer(s)	Length
1.	"By 1899, The Age of Outlaws and Gunslingers Was At An End"	Jackson, Silverman, O'Malley	1:28
2.	"Outlaws From the West"	Jackson	4:56
3.	"The Fine Art of Conversation"	Jackson	2:41
4.	"Mrs. Sadie Adler, Widow"	Jackson	2:09
5.	"An American Pastoral Scene"	Jackson	3:47

Side B
No.	Title	Writer(s)	Length
6.	"It All Makes Sense Now"	Jackson	4:09
7.	"Blessed Are the Peacemakers"	Jackson	3:41
8.	"Revenge is a Dish Best Eaten"	Jackson, Batkovic, Klecic, Silverman	4:51
9.	"Banking, The Old American Art"	Batkovic, Jackson	4:32
10.	"There She Is... A Real City, The Future"	Batkovic	0:36
11.	"Everybody Wake Up"	Jackson	1:47

Side C
No.	Title	Writer(s)	Length
12.	"Welcome to the New World (Part 1)"	Senyawa, Beaini	1:05
13.	"Welcome to the New World (Part 2)"	Senyawa, Beaini	4:33
14.	"Paradise Mercifully Departed"	Senyawa, Beaini	2:33
15.	"Doctor's Opinion"	Stetson	0:58
16.	"Fleeting Joy"	Stetson, Jackson	3:44
17.	"Icarus and Friends"	Stetson, Silverman, Ralicke	3:29
18.	"Country Pursuits"	Jackson, Ghersi	2:26

Side D
No.	Title	Writer(s)	Length
19.	"Red Dead Redemption"	Jackson, Lanois	3:37
20.	"Blood Feuds, Ancient and Modern (Part 1)"	Jackson	1:32
21.	"Blood Feuds, Ancient and Modern (Part 2)"	Jackson	7:15
22.	"The Wheel"	Jackson	3:53
23.	"American Venom"	Jackson, Bill Elm	2:52
24.	"American Reprise"	Jackson, Elm	0:38
Total length:			71:58

=== The Housebuilding EP ===
The Music of Red Dead Redemption 2: The Housebuilding EP

EP by David Ferguson and Matt Sweeney
- Released: February 12, 2021
- Studios: Butcher Shoppe, Nashville
- Genre: Soundtrack
- Length: 16:57
- Labels: Lakeshore; Rockstar Games
- Producers: David Ferguson; Matt Sweeney

The Music of Red Dead Redemption 2: The Housebuilding EP comprises the original songs created for Red Dead Redemption 2 by David Ferguson and Matt Sweeney. The album was released by Lakeshore Records and Rockstar Games digitally and as a vinyl record on February 12, 2021. Produced by Ferguson and Sweeney, the album was recorded at the Butcher Shoppe Recording Studio in Nashville and engineered by Sean Sullivan. It was mastered at DNA Mastering in Glendale, California. Ben Bryson of mxdwn praised the songs for "painting pictures through music without lyrics", noting that album is "less about the music and more about how the music functions".

Digital track listing
No.	Title	Writer(s)	Length
1.	"The Housebuilding Song"	David Ferguson	3:11
2.	"A Strange Kindness"	Ferguson, Matt Sweeney	3:02
3.	"A Quiet Time (Saloon Theme)"	Ferguson, Sweeney	3:30
4.	"The Course of True Love"	Ferguson, Sweeney	3:04
5.	"Do Not Seek Absolution"	Ferguson, Sweeney	4:10
Total length:			16:57

The vinyl release of the album, produced by Giles, split it into two sides across one record.

Vinyl track listing Side A
No.	Title	Writer(s)	Length
1.	"The Housebuilding Song"	Ferguson	3:11
2.	"A Strange Kindness"	Ferguson, Sweeney	3:02

Side B
No.	Title	Writer(s)	Length
3.	"A Quiet Time (Saloon Theme)"	Ferguson, Sweeney	3:30
4.	"The Course of True Love"	Ferguson, Sweeney	3:04
5.	"Do Not Seek Absolution"	Ferguson, Sweeney	4:10
Total length:			16:57

== Singles ==
=== "Unshaken" ===
"Unshaken"

Single by D'Angelo
- Released: January 4, 2019
- Studio: Electric Garden, New York
- Genre: Neo soul; country-western; soul
- Length: 3:53
- Label: RCA
- Songwriters: Michael Archer; Rocco DeLuca; Daniel Lanois
- Producer: Daniel Lanois

"Unshaken" is a song by D'Angelo. It was produced by Lanois, who wrote the track with D'Angelo and DeLuca, The song was released digitally as an individual single by RCA Records on January 4, 2019, prior to its release as part of the Original Soundtrack in July 2019. It was D'Angelo's first piece of new music released since his third studio album, Black Messiah, in December 2014. D'Angelo sings in his lower vocal register on the track, a deliberate choice by Pavlovich to differentiate it from his typical falsetto singing voice.

The song received praise: Esquire's Dom Nero described its performance in the game as "a sublime narrative moment that's among the best gaming has ever offered", and Amanda Hurych of AXS considered it "a perfect complement" to the game's narrative. Atwood Magazine's Ilana Kalish praised the combination of musical elements, particularly the lyrics and percussion. Game Informer's Jason Guisao identified that "Unshaken" was the game's most popular song. The track peaked at number six on the US R&B Digital Song Sales.

No.	Title	Writer(s)	Length
1.	"Unshaken"	Daniel Lanois, Rocco DeLuca, Michael Eugene Archer	3:53
Total length:			3:53

=== "Letter From Bluewater Man" ===
"Letter from Bluewater Man"

Single by Christone "Kingfish" Ingram
- Released: August 20, 2021
- Genre: Blues
- Length: 2:24
- Songwriters: Christone Ingram; Carl Lois
- Producers: Christone "Kingfish" Ingram; Carl Lois

"Letter from Bluewater Man" is a blues song performed by Christone "Kingfish" Ingram, who wrote and produced the track with Carl Lois. The song was created for Blood Money, an update for Red Dead Online released on July 13, 2021; in the game, Ingram plays "Bluewater" John, a guitar player based on Robert Johnson. Ingram sought to "capture the essence" of Johnson in the song. He wanted to avoid the traditional I–IV–IV chord progression, instead seeking an eight-bar blues progression and a "type of groove" like the blues standard song "Key to the Highway".

The song was released as a digital single on August 20, 2021. Andrea Domanick of KCRW found that the song "stands on its own", praising its "sparse arrangement, lilting guitar, and soul-punch vocals". Upon hearing the song used in the game's trailer, Sam Roche of Guitar World wrote that Ingram delivers "his instantly recognizable soulful vocals over a series of silky blue fingerstyle lines".

No.	Title	Writer(s)	Length
1.	"Letter from Bluewater Man"	Christone Ingram, Carl Lois	2:24
Total length:			2:24

== Legacy ==
Red Dead Redemption 2's music won awards at the Game Awards 2018 and from Giant Bomb and IGN. It was nominated for the Tin Pan Alley Award for Best Music in a Game at the 8th New York Game Awards, and Excellence in Musical Score at the 6th SXSW Gaming Awards. Banas of Push Square ranked the game's music as the best PlayStation game of 2018, and the third-best of the 2010s, writing that it "raised the bar on what a soundtrack could accomplish". GamingBolt's Shubhankar Parijat considered it the best game music of the year, writing that it "enhance[s]s the core essence of [the] game's DNA in every way possible ... better than most soundtracks we've seen in a game". Several critics named Red Dead Redemption 2 among the best video game soundtracks, citing its authenticity to the environment and assistance in its worldbuilding.

Lanois and his band Heavy Sun performed several songs from the game alongside Giddens at The Game Awards on December 6, 2018. Jackson led an hour-long live performance of the game's soundtrack at the Red Bull Music Festival in Los Angeles on February 23, 2019. Lanois performed music from the game's soundtrack with his band at Amoeba Music on September 19, 2019. In September 2019, as part of its Amazon Originals series, Amazon Music engaged Giddens to record a cover of "Cruel World", while Lanois and his band Heavy Sun covered "That's the Way It Is". In February and March 2021, to celebrate the release of The Housebuilding EP, Lakeshore Records released live performances of all five tracks by Ferguson, Sweeney, and Tim O'Brien, recorded at the Butcher Shoppe. D'Angelo, Giddens, and Lanois performed music from the game at the Battery in New York during the Tribeca Film Festival on June 10, 2021, to celebrate the inaugural Tribeca Games Award and the tenth anniversary of the festival's recognition of Rockstar's L.A. Noire (2011); this marked D'Angelo's only live performance of the game's songs and his final public performance before his death in 2025.
