= Unshaken =

Neo soul song by D'Angelo

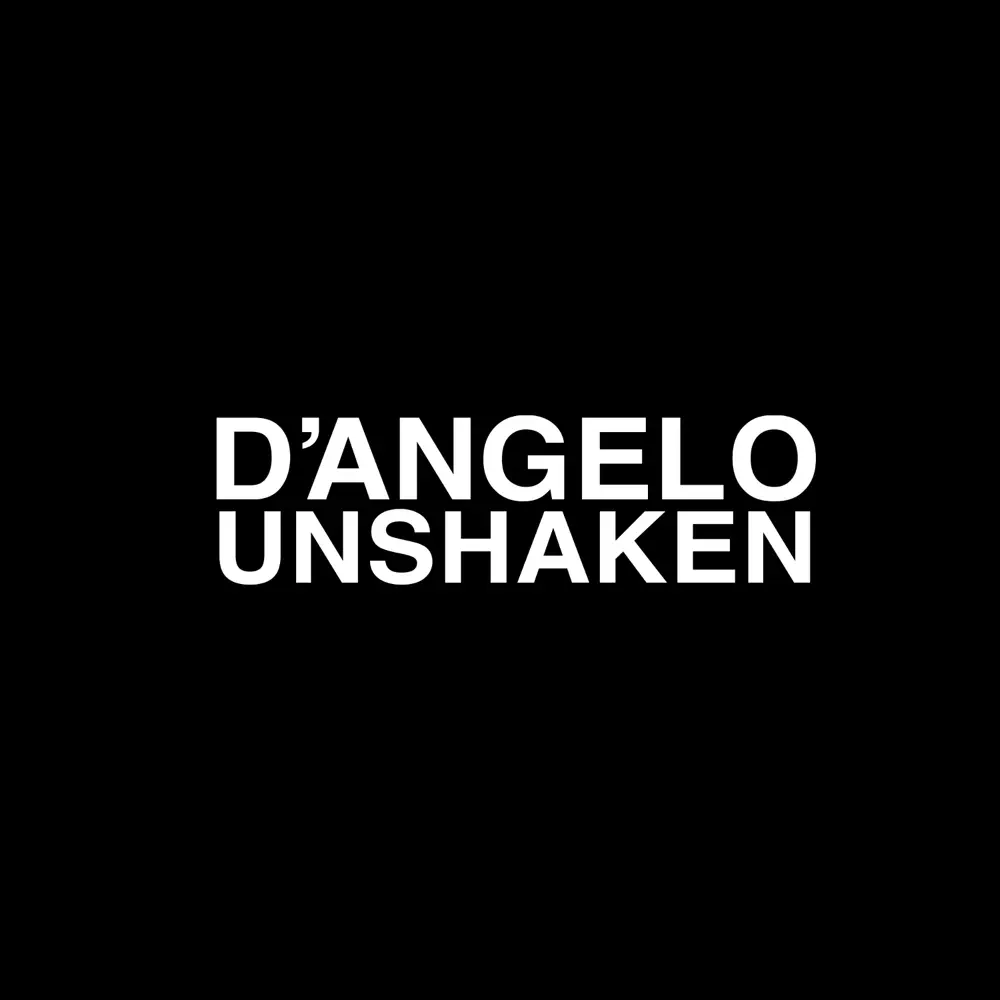

Single by D'Angelo

from the album The Music of Red Dead Redemption 2 (Original Soundtrack)
- Released: January 4, 2019
- Studio: Electric Garden Recording, New York
- Genre: Neo soul; country-western; soul
- Length: 3:53
- Label: RCA
- Songwriters: Michael Archer; Rocco DeLuca; Daniel Lanois
- Producer: Daniel Lanois

D'Angelo singles chronology
"Betray My Heart" (2015)	"Unshaken" (2019)	"I Want You Forever" (2024)

"Unshaken" is a song by American singer-songwriter D'Angelo. It was produced by Daniel Lanois, who wrote the track with D'Angelo and Rocco DeLuca. The song was written for the original soundtrack to the 2018 video game Red Dead Redemption 2. It was released as a digital single through RCA Records on January 4, 2019, and later as part of the game's soundtrack released by Lakeshore Records and Rockstar Games. It was D'Angelo's first piece of new music released since his third studio album, Black Messiah, released in December 2014.

D'Angelo was invited to perform a song for Red Dead Redemption 2 after showing enthusiasm during playtesting, having been a big fan of its predecessor. DeLuca conceived the chant in the song's chorus, based on a proverb by Paramahansa Yogananda. Lanois felt that the lyrics were appropriate to the game's narrative. The song is moderately slow and includes D'Angelo's lower vocal register. "Unshaken" received positive reviews, both in the context of the game and as an individual track, and reached number 6 on Billboard's R&B Digital Song Sales chart.

== Background ==
D'Angelo's last piece of music before "Unshaken" was his third studio album, Black Messiah (2014), his first in 14 years. Some time afterwards, he discovered that Rockstar Games was developing a new video game, Red Dead Redemption 2; as he was a big fan of its predecessor, Red Dead Redemption (2010), D'Angelo reached out to Ivan Pavlovich, the director of music and audio at Rockstar, to play the game. Pavlovich recalled that D'Angelo would visit Rockstar's New York City office at midnight and play for several hours, adding that the singer found the game "incredible".

Rockstar's music team invited D'Angelo to perform on a song for the game's soundtrack. Pavlovich felt that D'Angelo's involvement led to producer Daniel Lanois's engagement with the project. Lanois took an early version of "Unshaken" to D'Angelo in New York. They added a percussion track and turned it into a full song, with Brian Blade on drums, Cyril Neville on cowbell, Lanois playing guitar, and D'Angelo playing Rhodes piano. The recording process took around a week and a half. Lanois and D'Angelo originally began working on a rock-oriented song in a 6/8 time signature, but "it didn't pan out".

== Composition and lyrical interpretation ==
"Unshaken"
A 23-second sample of the chorus of "Unshaken". The chant for the song is based on a proverb by Paramahansa Yogananda: "You must stand unshaken amidst the crash of breaking worlds".

"Unshaken" is a moderately slow track, performed in the key of G minor with a tempo of 80 beats per minute. Chaz Kangas of KZGO called it a neo soul song, while Jon Caramanica of The New York Times described it as "lonely cowboy-western soul". Musically, Rolling Stone's Elias Leight called the song "meditative", featuring soft keyboards, low-key percussion, and a groove inspired by New Orleans rhythm and blues. D'Angelo sings in his lower vocal register on the track, a deliberate choice by Pavlovich to differentiate it from his typical falsetto singing voice. Rolling Stone's Ryan Reed described the performance as "crooning bleak imagery over a percussive groove". Lanois's co-writer Rocco DeLuca conceived the chant for "Unshaken" in New Orleans, based on a proverb by Paramahansa Yogananda: "You must stand unshaken amidst the crash of breaking worlds". Lanois felt the term applied to the determination of the game's characters throughout the story. The chant was also used in the song "Crash of Worlds".

Ilana Kalish of Atwood Magazine described the song's opening percussion as a "secret knock on a hidden door", leading into the "privately uttered password" of the opening lines, which repeats Yogananda's proverb. AXS's Amanda Hurych noted the song's chorus is a plea for strength in difficult situations. Esquire's Dom Nero described the proverb as "something between a battle cry and an elegy" that encapsulates the game's narrative direction. Atwood Magazine's Kalish felt the verses unlocked the thoughts of Red Dead Redemption 2 protagonist Arthur Morgan as he attempts to decipher his path. She identified a connection between D'Angelo's lyrical approach on "Unshaken" and his previous music, avoiding being "preachy" while remaining universal. Game Informer's Jason Guisao found the song recounts the game's important themes: "redemption through violence, redemption through heroism, and, most importantly, redemption through fatherhood".

== Release ==
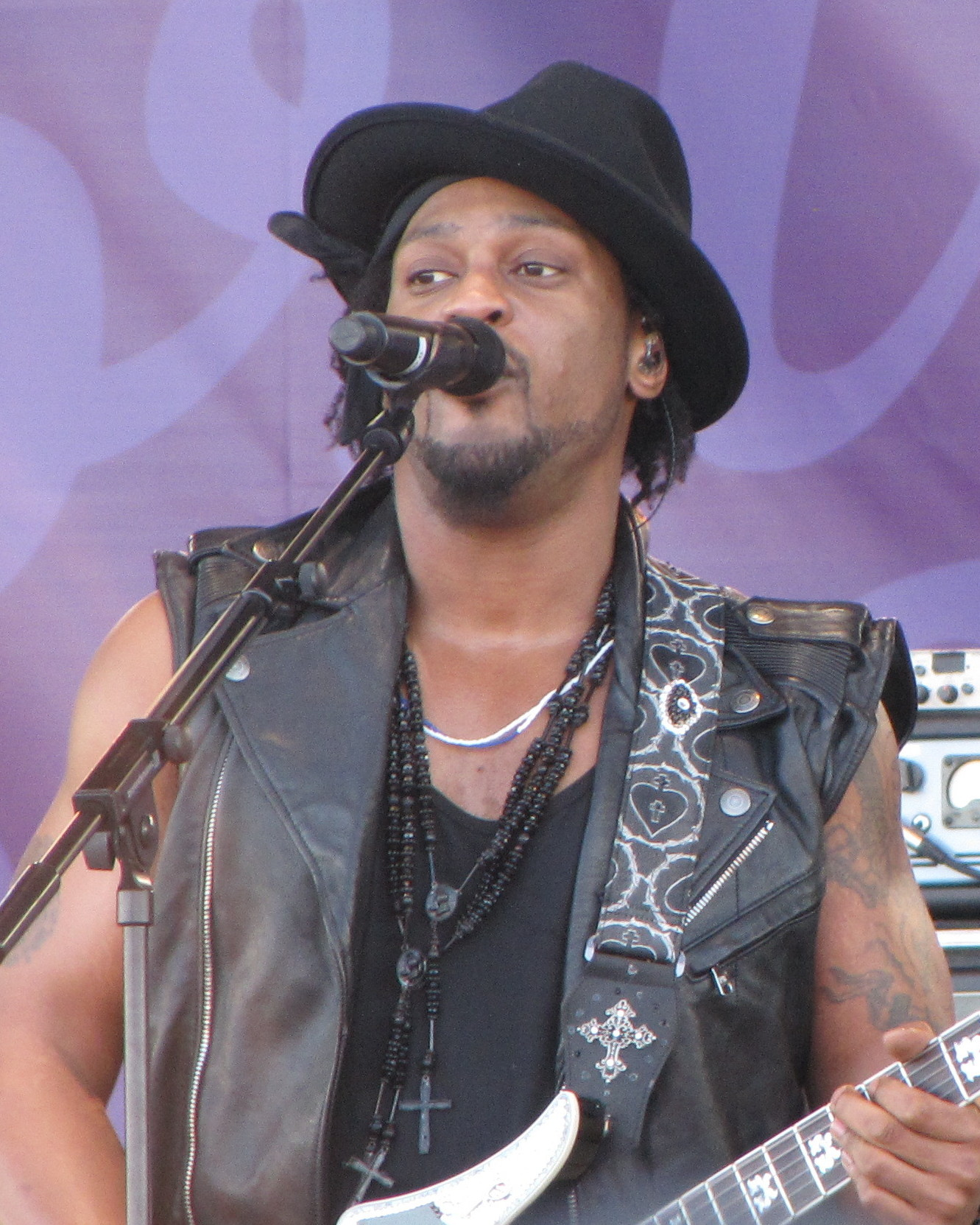
D'Angelo (pictured in 2012) co-wrote and performed "Unshaken".

"Unshaken" was originally only available for listening via gameplay in Red Dead Redemption 2 when it was released on October 26, 2018. It is played in the background while Arthur rides on a horse back to his camp at a pivotal moment in the story. Bootleg versions were eventually uploaded to YouTube for listening outside of the gameplay. The official release came on January 4, 2019, when the song was uploaded onto digital platforms through RCA Records. It was later published by Lakeshore Records and Rockstar Games as part of The Music of Red Dead Redemption 2 (Original Soundtrack), released digitally on July 12, 2019, and as a CD and vinyl record on September 20, 2019.

D'Angelo's only live performance of the song was at the Battery in New York during the Tribeca Film Festival on June 10, 2021, to celebrate the inaugural Tribeca Games Award and the tenth anniversary of the festival's recognition of Rockstar's L.A. Noire (2011). It was his final public performance before his death in October 2025.

== Reception ==
Atwood Magazine's Kalish praised the combination of musical elements in "Unshaken", particularly the lyrics and percussion. Hurych of AXS described the song as "a perfect complement" to Red Dead Redemption 2's narrative. Esquire's Nero called the track "transporting", hailing its performance in the game as "a sublime narrative moment that's among the best gaming has ever offered". Forbes's Dave Thier wrote that the song's percussion track was in rhythm with the gallop of Arthur's horse in the game, and Game Informer's Guisao identified "Unshaken" as the game's most popular song. It peaked at number six on the US R&B Digital Song Sales in January 2019.

== Personnel ==
Credits adapted from the liner notes of The Music of Red Dead Redemption 2 (Original Soundtrack):

- D'Angelo – vocals, Rhodes piano, writer, lyrics
- Brian Blade – drums
- Rocco DeLuca – writer, lyrics
- Daryl Johnson – percussion
- Daniel Lanois – guitar, writer, lyrics, producer, mixing engineer
- Cyril Neville – percussion
