= Charles Cohen =

American musician (1945–2017)

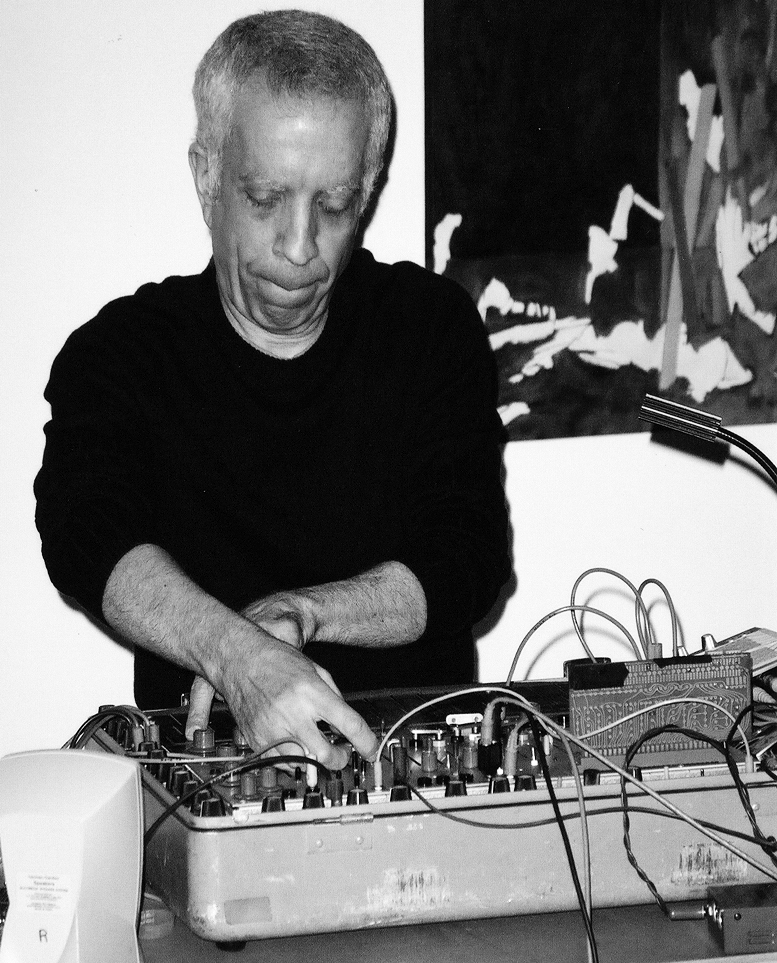
- Charles Cohen

Background information
- Born: October 9, 1945
- Died: September 29, 2017
- Genres: Ambient, avant garde, glitch, noise
- Occupation: Musician
- Instrument: Buchla Easel
- Website: www.colorisluxury.org

Charles Cohen (1945-2017) was a Philadelphia, Pennsylvania area-based free jazz musician and composer. Creating music since 1971, his music was entirely improvisational and produced solely on a vintage Buchla Music Easel synthesizer, an extremely rare integrated analog performance instrument made by synthesizer pioneer Don Buchla. He has been increasingly recognized for his artistry performing internationally and was one of a handful of musicians who has mastered the Buchla Music Easel. Only twenty-five of the instruments were produced in the early 1970s and only a few have survived. He was also considered a pioneer in synthesizers and performance music. In 2011, Cohen was named a Pew Fellow by the Pew Center for Arts & Heritage for his contributions to improvised and electronic music.

He says he was inspired by free jazz pianist Cecil Taylor. Cohen worked for many years with musician Jeff Cain in their group The Ghostwriters. He worked with other media artists in improvisational settings such as the Red Room, Knitting Factory and Tonic. Cohen concentrated on creating electronic music in the setting of the live performance space. He was openly gay and has performed in LGBT-specific performances, events and venues.

== Synthesizer usage ==
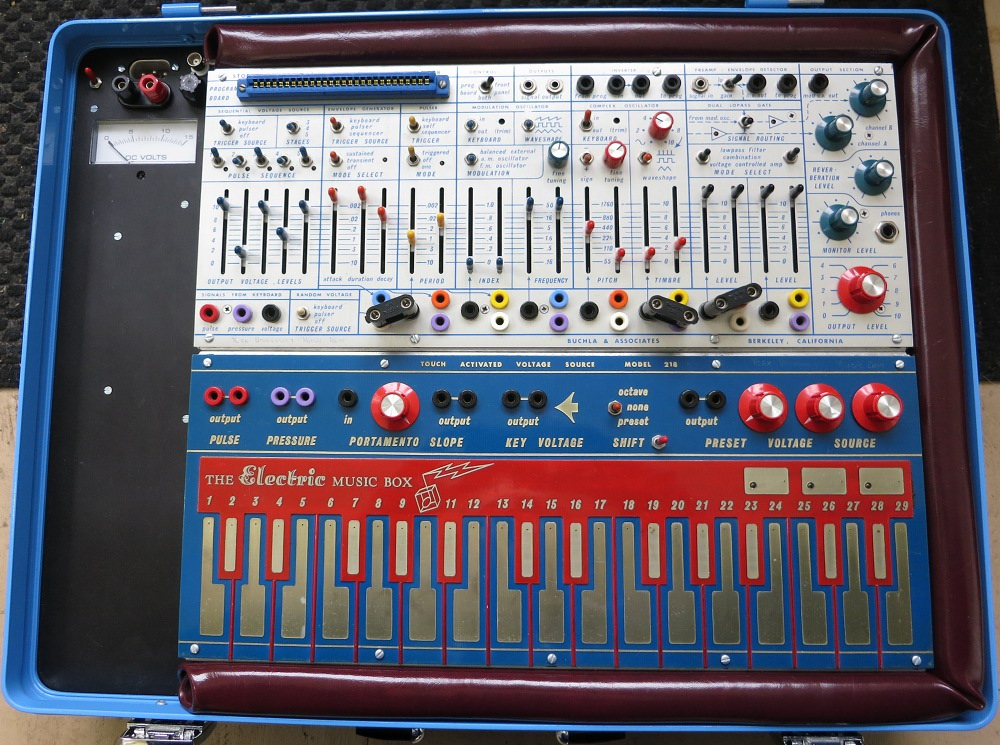
Cohen used the Buchla Music Easel synthesizer

Buchla's instruments, such as the Music Easel (pictured), use a different method of timbre generation than Moog synthesizers. Moog units use oscillators with basic function generator type waveshapes and rely heavily on filtering with 24 dB resonant low-pass filters, while Buchlas are geared toward complex oscillators using frequency modulation, amplitude modulation, and dynamic waveshaping to produce other forms of timbre modulation. Many of Don Buchla's designs, including the Low-Pass Gates (later called Dynamic Managers) contain vactrols (photoresistive opto-isolators used as voltage-controlled potentiometers) that contributed to a very "natural" perception of Buchla sound.

I've been playing the Buchla Music Easel since 1976. With its color-coded slide pots, its musically logical panel layout, and its almost sculptural patching system, I can comprehend the state of the instrument with a fleeting glance.

== Discography ==
=== LPs ===
- Brother I Prove You Wrong (Morphine, 2015, Doser026LP, LP)
- The Middle Distance (EU: Morphine, 2013, DOSER 019, LP)
- Group Motion (EU: Morphine, 2013, DOSER 020, LP)
- Music For Dance And Theater (EU: Morphine, 2013, DOSER 021, Do LP)
- Running in the Family (EU: Polydor, 1987, LASER 121, Do LP)

=== Reworks ===
- Morphosis Reworks (EU: Morphine, 2013, REDOSE 002, 12")

=== The Ghostwriters ===
- Objects in Mirrors Are Closer Than They Appear (US: Red Music, 1981, 001)
- Remote Dreaming (US: Mu Psych, 1986, MP-6002C)

=== Collaborations ===
- Redose-3 with Senyawa (EU: Morphine, 2015, REDOSE 003 12")
- Straylight (US: Deep Listening, 2001, DL-CD-15)

=== Compilations ===
- SUBMIT (US: alien robot media, 1999, arcd01)

== Performances ==
- Charles Cohen at the Buchla Music Easel (Vimeo: vimeo.com/902069)
- Excerpt of Charles Cohen at the 2015 Paris Festival Présences Électronique (YouTube: )

== Child sex abuse conviction ==
On September 28, 2015, Cohen was arrested in Montgomery County, Pennsylvania in a police undercover sting operation for soliciting sex from a minor, when in reality the "minor" was an undercover police detective. He was charged with "criminal attempt of involuntary deviant sexual intercourse with a child under the age of 16," "unlawful contact with a minor" and "criminal use of a communication facility." On August 12, 2016, Cohen pleaded no contest to the felony charges against him, due to poor health and lack of energy to contest the charges. Cohen served five months in prison, being released July 29, 2017 due to poor health (Parkinson's disease). Two months later he died.
