= Senyawa (band) =

Indonesian experimental band

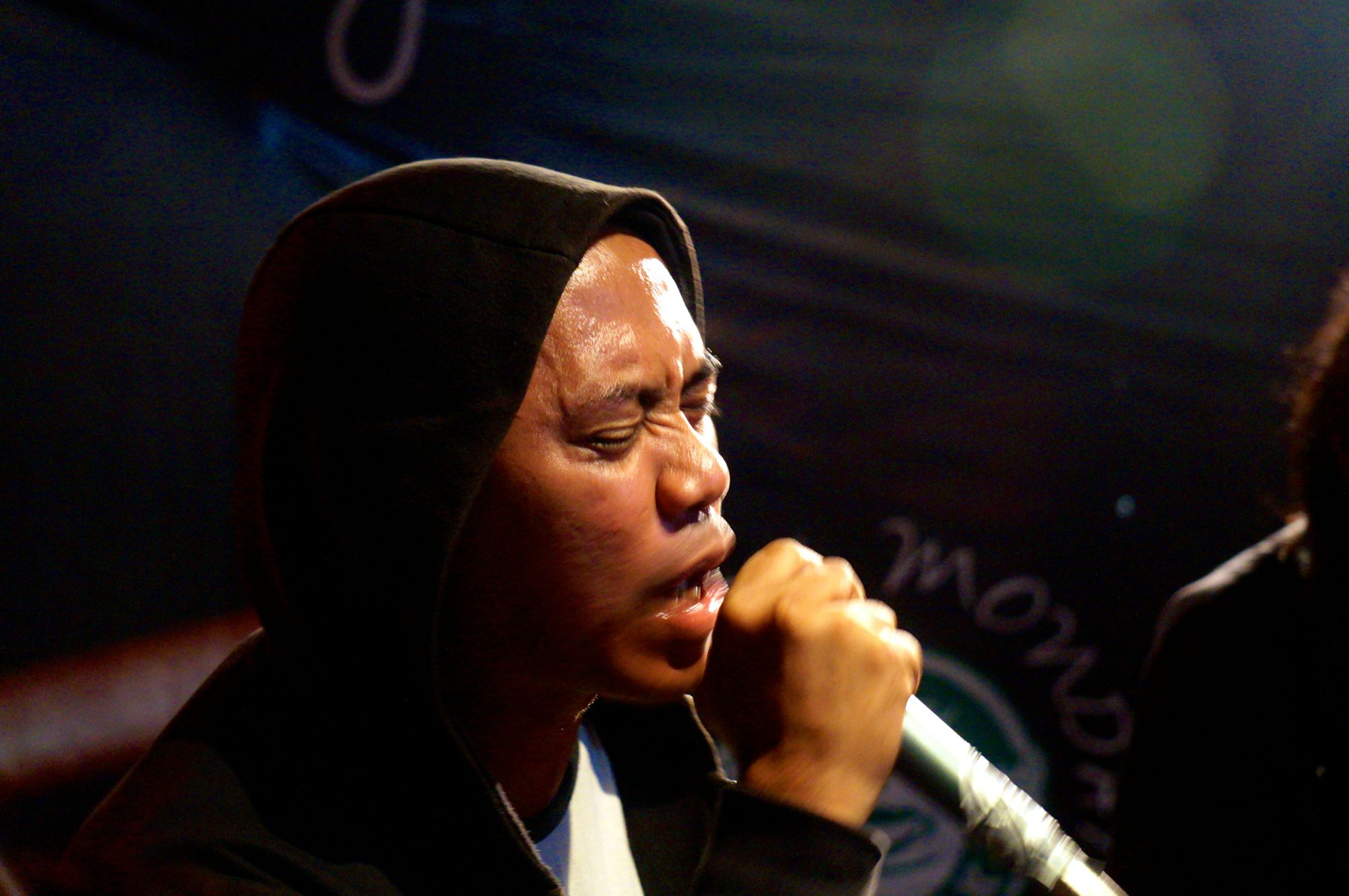
- Senyawa's Rully Shabara

Background information
- Origin: Indonesia
- Genres: avant-folk; neotribal; experimental music; doom metal
- Years active: 2010–present
- Labels: Yes No Wave Music; dualplOVER; !aNGRr!; Morphine Records
- Members: Rully Shabara; Wukir Suryadi
- Website: www.senyawa.tumblr.com

Senyawa is an experimental band from Java, Indonesia, consisting of Rully Shabara and Wukir Suryadi. The band was formed in 2010 in Yogyakarta.

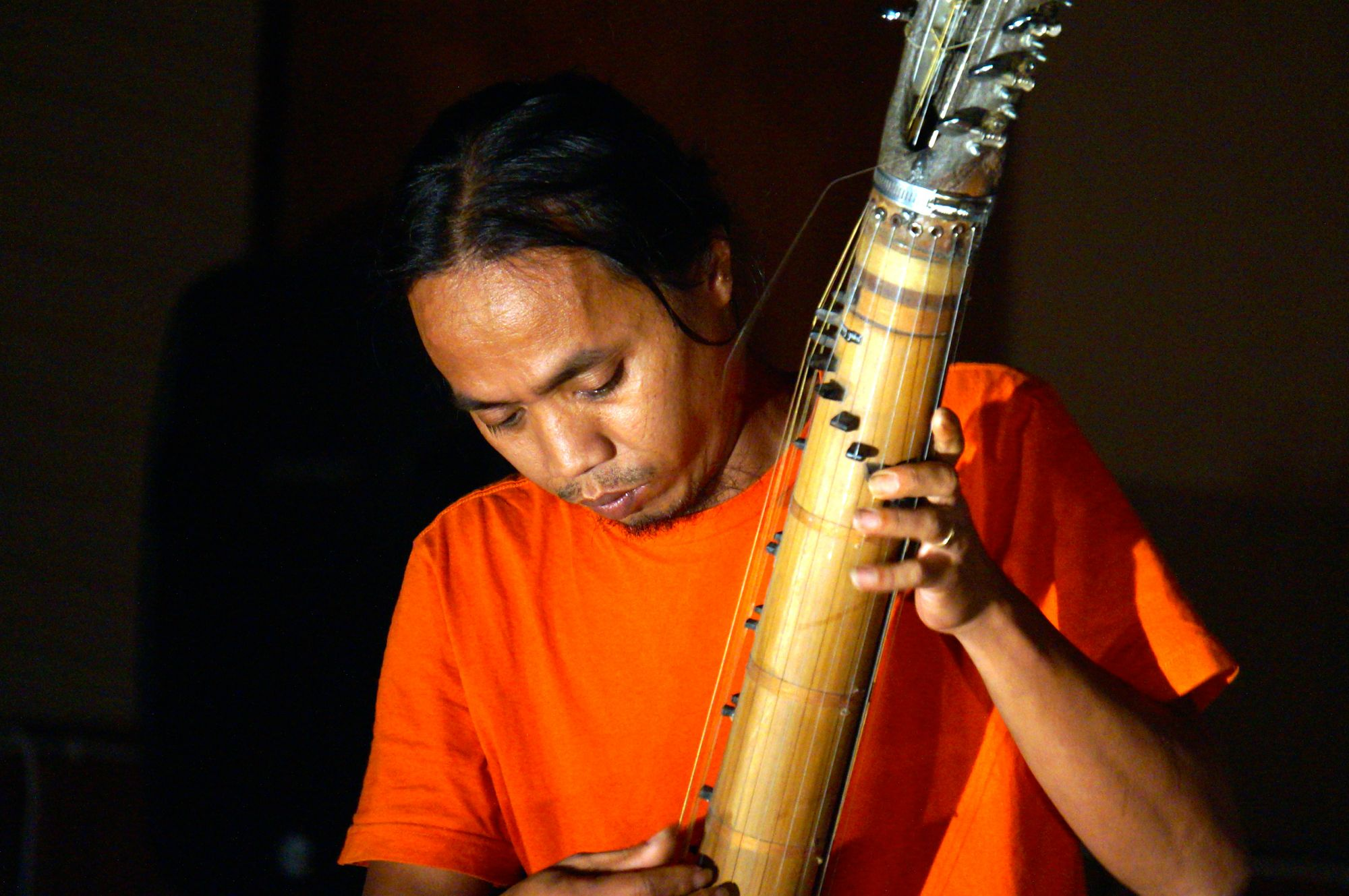
Senyawa's Wukir Suryadi playing a modernized tube zither.

The band mixes influences from musical and folklore traditions from the Indonesian archipelago with experimental music. The band's neo-tribal sound has been described to mix "punk attitude" with "avant-garde aesthetics". According to critics, Senyawa has "managed to embody the aural flavours of Javanese music while exploring the framework of experimental music practice, pushing the boundaries of both traditions" to create a sound that is "thoroughly out of this world."

Shabara provides his extended vocal techniques to Senyawa. The band's lyrics are in various languages of Indonesia, including Sulawesian, Javanese, and Indonesian. Senyawa's music is provided by Suryadi's self-built musical instruments made from bamboo and traditional agricultural tools from rural Indonesia.

Senyawa has been performing extensively in Asia, Australia, and Europe. They have collaborated with notable musicians such as Stephen O'Malley, Lucas Abela, Yasuke Akai, Jon Sass, Damo Suzuki, Jerome Cooper, Keiji Haino, Melt Banana, Tatsuya Yoshida, Charles Cohen, David Shea, and Kazuhisa Uchihashi.

In 2021, the band collaborated with 44 independent labels from across the globe to release their album Alkisah. The labels were provided with the digital tracks and were permitted to choose their own artwork as well as master and provide remixes to best appeal to local tastes. In 2022, Senyawa are set to embark on Return to Real Live concert tour, including a festival appearance at the Primavera Sound.

== Discography ==
=== Studio albums ===
- Senyawa (2011)
- Senyawa with Kazuhisa Uchihashi (2012)
- Acaraki (2014)
- Unheard Indonesia Vol.5: Senyawa with Arrington de Dionyso (2014)
- Menjadi (2015)
- Brønshøj (Puncak) (2016)
- Sujud (2018)
- Bima Sakti (with Stephen O'Malley) (2020)
- Alkisah (2021) (Phantom Limb)

=== EPs ===
- Redose — 3 (with Charles Cohen) (2015)
- Kereta Malam (with Vialka) (2015)
- Split (with Melt-Banana) (2016)

=== Live albums ===
- Live at Grub (2011)
- Live at Cafe Oto (2015)
- Calling The New Gods (2018)

== Awards ==
1. Best Concert of the Year/Best Performing Artist 2016 by Tempo Magazine (Indonesia)
2. Ars Electronica Award 2017 in the category of Digital Music and Sound with Lucas Abela's Gamelan Wizard
3. Editor's Choice Award 2017 by Rolling Stone Indonesia
4. Green Room Awards 2018 for Best Music Composition and Sound Design
