= Music of L.A. Noire =

Music of the video game L.A. Noire

The music for the 2011 neo-noir detective video game L.A. Noire, developed by Team Bondi and published by Rockstar Games, was composed by musicians Andrew Hale and Simon Hale. Recorded at Abbey Road Studios in London, the score also features contributions from Woody Jackson, who had collaborated with Rockstar on other projects both previously and since. Andrew Hale felt that composing the game's score was about setting a mood, attempting to compose music that felt accessible to players. The score was inspired by films from the 1940s, though the team avoided specifically composing for this time period, instead opting to focus on that after the music had been produced. Three supplementary vocal recordings were composed by The Real Tuesday Weld and performed by Claudia Brücken; they also sought to fit with the game's setting.

The soundtrack album for L.A. Noire was released in May 2011. A second soundtrack, entitled L.A. Noire Remixed EP, was released on the same day, consisting of six jazz classics remixed by contemporary DJs. Critical reception to the soundtracks was positive, as reviewers felt that the music connected appropriately with the gameplay and time period. The game's music was nominated for numerous awards.

== Production and composition ==
"Main Theme"
The game's main theme was composed by Andrew Hale, who collaborated with his brother Simon to produce original music.

L.A. Noire features an original score composed by brothers Andrew and Simon Hale. It accompanies the gameplay, alerting players at specific times; musical cues play when players approach items of interest during investigations. Recorded at Abbey Road Studios, the score was inspired by orchestral scores from 1940s films. Music supervisor Ivan Pavlovich said the composers were inspired to reflect Rockstar's focus on authenticity and realism in their music. Andrew Hale found composition a flexible process "about setting a mood" as opposed to a "mechanical" process to fit the game's time period. They sought music that felt accessible to players by using an orchestral score and avoiding focusing on swing or jazz.

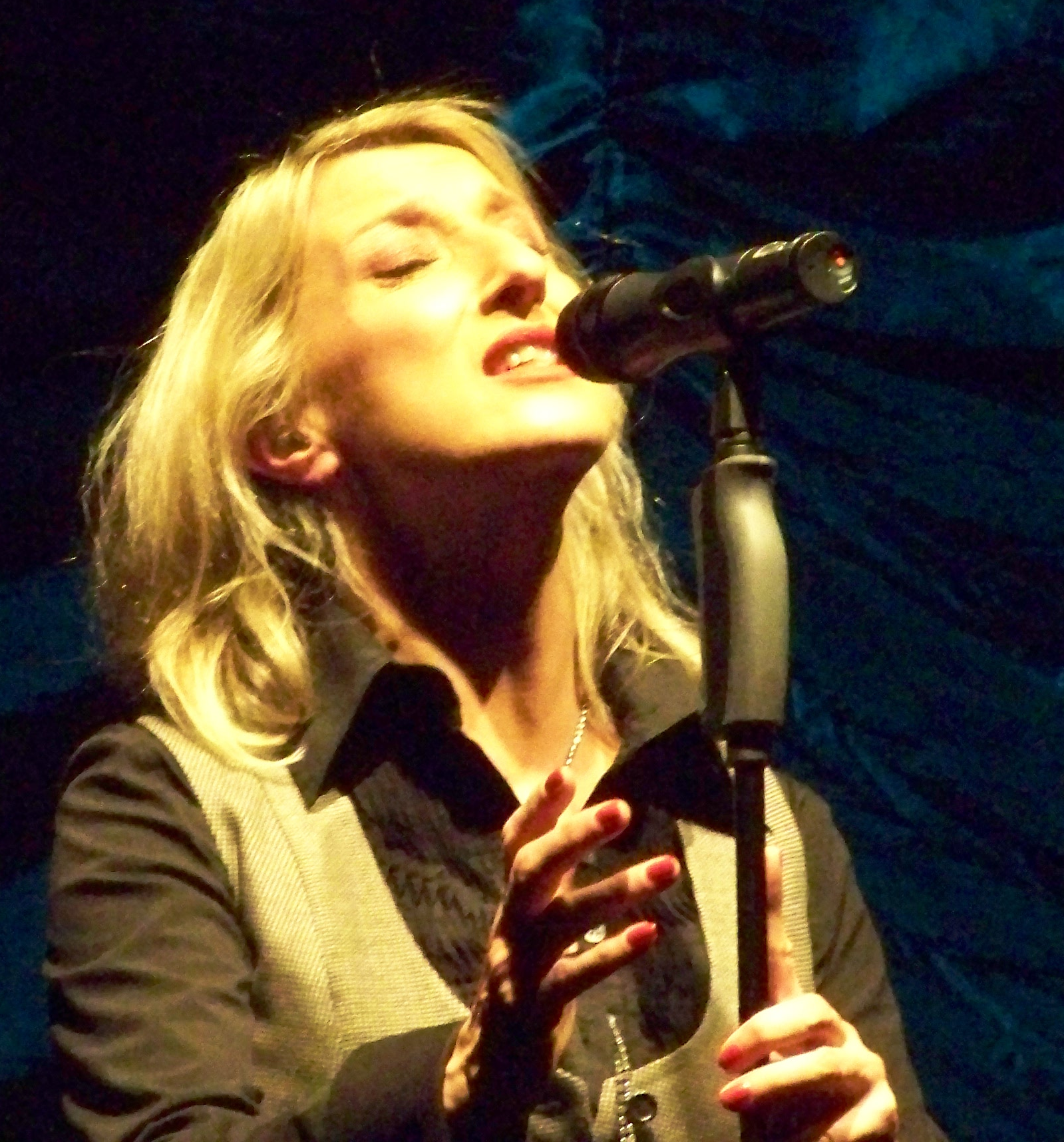
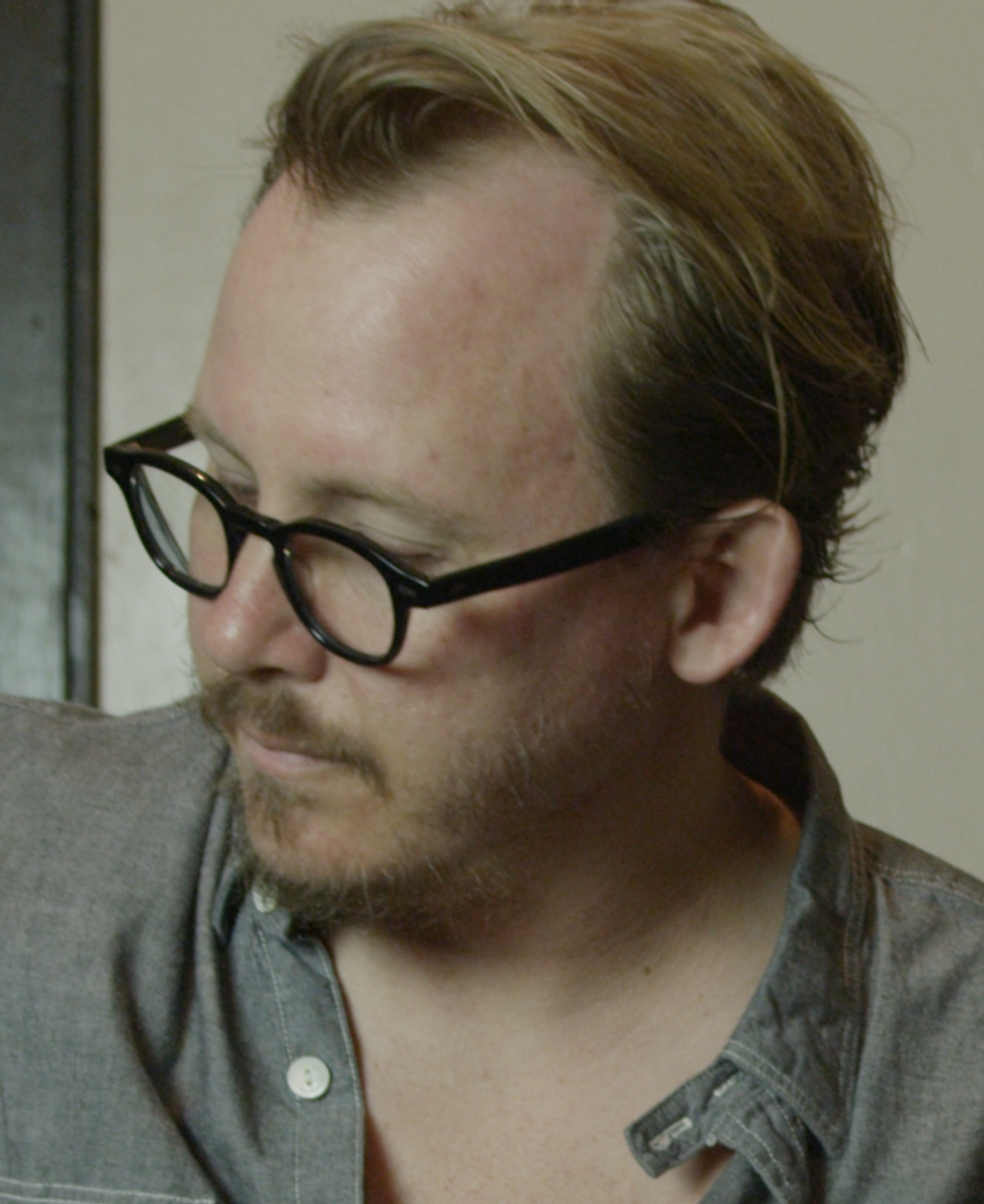
Rockstar engaged Claudia Brücken (left) to perform the game's original vocal tracks, and Woody Jackson (right) to compose additional incidental music.

To assist with the score, Rockstar engaged Woody Jackson, who had previously collaborated with the team on the music of Red Dead Redemption (2010). Jackson re-orchestrated one of the themes and wrote much of the in-game music. While the game's score largely uses a live orchestra, Jackson found that this led to difficulties with interactive music as the player can hear the loop; inspired by film noir and the works of musicians like Bernard Herman, Jackson departed from the existing music and wrote original tracks in about a month.

Like other games published by Rockstar, L.A. Noire contains licensed music tracks provided by an in-game radio. Over thirty songs, from artists such as Billie Holiday, Louis Armstrong and Ella Fitzgerald, feature in the game. In addition to the original score and licensed tracks, the game features original vocal recordings that "create an authentic sound to suit the musical identity of the period". When The Real Tuesday Weld were commissioned to compose the original compositions, they sought vocals that could "evoke the period", ultimately falling upon Claudia Brücken. Three vocal tracks were produced: "(I Always Kill) The Things I Love", "Guilty", and "Torched Song".

== Albums ==
=== L.A. Noire Official Soundtrack ===
L.A. Noire Official Soundtrack

Soundtrack album by Andrew Hale and Simon Hale
- Released: 17 May 2011
- Studio: Abbey Road
- Genre: Video game soundtrack
- Length: 55:04
- Label: Rockstar Games

L.A. Noire Official Soundtrack comprises songs from the game, composed and produced by Andrew Hale and Simon Hale. It spans 28 tracks, covering a duration of 55 minutes, and features additional songs composed and performed by the Real Tuesday Weld and Claudia Brücken. It was first released on the iTunes Store on 17 May 2011, alongside L.A. Noire Remixed. The score was recorded at Abbey Road Studios in London..

Kotaku's Kirk Hamilton ranked the game's music upon the best of 2011, appreciating the "vibe" it sets for the genre and time period. Video Game Writers's Jen Bosier commended its recreation of the period and felt the music could be enjoyed outside the game. SF Critic's Evan Andra echoed these remarks and praised the final three vocal tracks as "a suitably enjoyable conclusion to the album". London Evening Standard's David Smyth named the vocal tracks "tense and beautiful" and the overall soundtrack "mood music of the finest calibre". Movie Wave's James Southall found the soundtrack assisted the game's atmosphere and praised the album's "action music". Video Game Music Online's Simon Elchlepp wrote the soundtrack "successfully recreates several aspects of 1940s' jazz and movie scores", praising Hale's understanding of the music type.

The soundtrack won the award for Original Music at the 8th British Academy Games Awards. It was nominated for Best Original Score for a Video Game or Interactive Media at the 2011 International Film Music Critics Association Awards, and Best Score — Contemporary/Alternative from Video Game Music Online.

No.	Title	Artist	Length
1.	"Main Theme"	Andrew Hale	3:04
2.	"New Beginning, Pt. 1"	Andrew Hale & Simon Hale	1:07
3.	"New Beginning, Pt. 2"	Andrew Hale & Simon Hale	1:25
4.	"New Beginning, Pt. 3"	Andrew Hale & Simon Hale	3:18
5.	"Minor 9th"	Andrew Hale	2:50
6.	"Pride of the Job, Pt. 1"	Andrew Hale & Simon Hale	2:38
7.	"Pride of the Job, Pt. 2"	Andrew Hale & Simon Hale	2:32
8.	"Noire Clarinet"	Andrew Hale	2:33
9.	"Temptation, Pt. 1"	Andrew Hale & Simon Hale	1:14
10.	"Temptation, Pt. 2"	Andrew Hale & Simon Hale	2:13
11.	"Temptation, Pt. 3"	Andrew Hale & Simon Hale	0:52
12.	"J.J."	Andrew Hale & Fly	1:30
13.	"Redemption, Pt. 1"	Andrew Hale & Simon Hale	1:07
14.	"Redemption, Pt. 2"	Andrew Hale & Simon Hale	2:28
15.	"Redemption, Pt. 3"	Andrew Hale & Simon Hale	1:19
16.	"Slow Brood"	Andrew Hale & Simon Hale	2:04
17.	"Use and Abuse, Pt. 1"	Andrew Hale & Simon Hale	1:26
18.	"Use and Abuse, Pt. 2"	Andrew Hale & Simon Hale	0:49
19.	"Use and Abuse, Pt. 3"	Andrew Hale & Simon Hale	0:38
20.	"Use and Abuse, Pt. 4"	Andrew Hale & Simon Hale	1:21
21.	"Fall from Grace, Pt. 1"	Andrew Hale & Simon Hale	1:44
22.	"Fall from Grace, Pt. 2"	Andrew Hale & Simon Hale	1:13
23.	"Murder Brood, Pt. 1"	Andrew Hale & Simon Hale	2:34
24.	"Murder Brood, Pt. 2"	Andrew Hale & Simon Hale	2:18
25.	"Main Theme (Redux)"	Andrew Hale	1:26
26.	"(I Always Kill) The Things I Love"	Claudia Brücken & The Real Tuesday Weld	2:55
27.	"Guilty"	Claudia Brücken & The Real Tuesday Weld	2:14
28.	"Torched Song"	Claudia Brücken & The Real Tuesday Weld	4:12
Total length:			55:04

=== L.A. Noire Remixed EP ===
L.A. Noire Remixed

Remix album
- Released: 17 May 2011
- Genre: Remix album
- Length: 24:22
- Label: Rockstar Games; Verve Records

L.A. Noire Remixed consists of six jazz classics remixed by contemporary DJs. Advertised as a "special installment" of the Verve Remixed Series, the album includes songs by artists of the period, such as Ella Fitzgerald, Lionel Hampton, Billie Holiday, and Dinah Washington, remixed by DJs such as Ticklah, DJ Premier, and Moodymann.

The album was released on the iTunes Store on 17 May 2011, alongside the main soundtrack. London Evening Standard's Smyth commended the release, calling the songs "tastefully modernised", and Video Game Writers's Bosier dubbed it "the gem of the collection" for invoking "the feeling of the game" and "a nice retro-vibe". The album was nominated for Best Album – Remix from Video Game Music Online.

No.	Title	Original artist	Length
1.	"Stone Cold Dead in the Market (Ticklah remix)"	Ella Fitzgerald & Louis Jordan	4:16
2.	"Hey! Ba-Ba-Re-Bop (Midnight Sun remix)"	Lionel Hampton & his orchestra	5:57
3.	"A Slick Chick (Maximum Balloon remix)"	Dinah Washington	2:57
4.	"Ain't Nobody Here But Us Chickens (DJ Premier remix)"	Louis Jordan	2:37
5.	"Sing Sing Sing (Truth & Soul remix)"	Gene Krupa	4:19
6.	"That Ole Devil Called Love (Moodymann remix)"	Billie Holiday	4:16
Total length:			24:22
