= Music of Red Dead Redemption =

The music for the 2010 action-adventure western video game Red Dead Redemption, developed by Rockstar San Diego and published by Rockstar Games, was composed by musicians Bill Elm and Woody Jackson. Recorded at Jackson's studio in Los Angeles, the soundtracks were produced by David Holmes. The music was intended to imitate soundtracks of 1960s Western films, such as Ennio Morricone's work on the Dollars Trilogy. In collaboration with each other, Elm and Jackson produced over fourteen hours of music across fifteen months. The composers used unconventional instruments to create unique sounds, and worked with artists such as Tommy Morgan during production. Four supplementary vocal recordings were also produced for the game.

The soundtrack album for Red Dead Redemption was released on iTunes in May 2010. Additional compositions, composed for the game's standalone expansion pack Undead Nightmare, were released on a second soundtrack in November 2010. Critical reception to the soundtracks was positive, as reviewers felt that the music connected appropriately with the gameplay and genre. The game's music was nominated for numerous awards. Several tracks became popular and begot cover versions and live performances.

== Background and recording ==
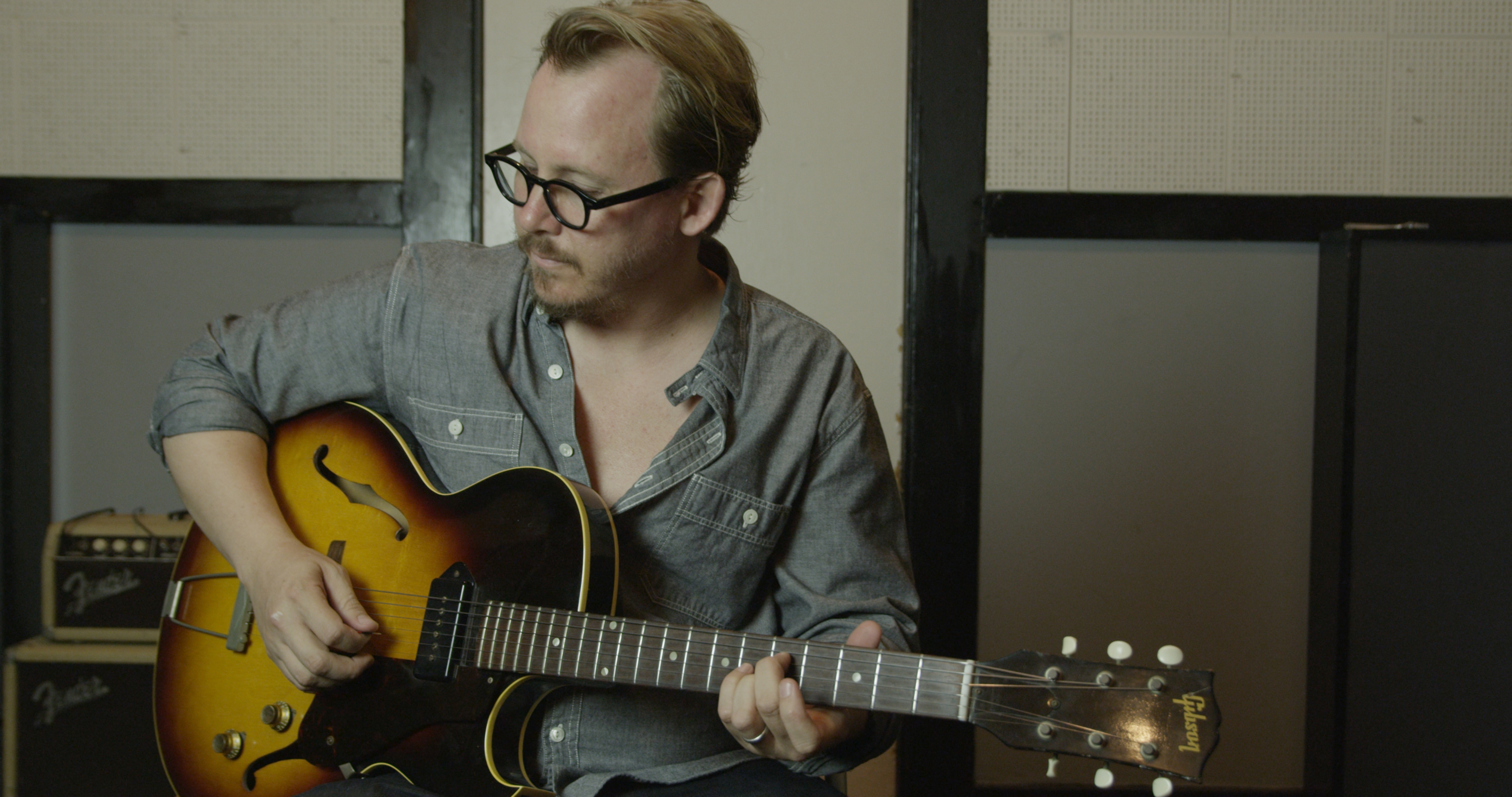
Woody Jackson composed the score for Red Dead Redemption, in collaboration with Bill Elm.

Red Dead Redemption is one of the first games by Rockstar to use an original score. Music supervisor Ivan Pavlovich has cited the large scale of the game as one of the largest difficulties when producing the score. He said that, in order to achieve an effective gaming experience, the game could not solely feature licensed music, like previous Rockstar games. "We figured we'd need to write an original score," Pavlovich said. To work on the score, Rockstar engaged Bill Elm and Woody Jackson, member and former member of Friends of Dean Martinez, respectively. In collaboration with each other, the duo composed over fourteen hours of music, which scores the game's missions, across fifteen months. The original score and subsequent album were both recorded and mixed at Jackson's personal recording studio in Los Angeles, and mastered at Capitol Studios. Following the recording, Irish producer and composer David Holmes listened to the original score, and subsequently spent three weeks compiling fifteen instrumental tracks that could be used as standalone songs for the game's official soundtrack. Holmes attempted to make the soundtrack representative of the variety of sounds and moods in the game. Four vocal performances were also recorded for use in the soundtrack. (Note: Four vocal performances were recorded for the soundtrack: "Far Away" by José González, "Compass (Red Dead on Arrival Version)" by Jamie Lidell, "Deadman's Gun" by Ashtar Command, and "Bury Me Not on the Lone Prairie" by William Elliott Whitmore.)

"(Theme From) Red Dead Redemption"
"(Theme From) Red Dead Redemption", the game's main theme, was composed by Bill Elm and Woody Jackson. The duo collaborated to produce original music for the game.

Recorded at 130 beats per minute in A minor, most of songs featured are constructed from motifs in the game's dynamic soundtrack. A mix of modern instruments and those featured in traditional Western films, such as the jaw harp, were used. Creative uses of instruments were used to bring unique sounds, such as playing a trumpet onto the surface of a timpani drum. Rockstar also consulted musicians who played traditional Western instruments; harmonica player Tommy Morgan, who had been featured on several films over his 60-year career, provided traditional harmonica segments for the game. Beyond trumpets, nylon guitars and accordions, the composers incorporated other instruments, such as flutes and ocarinas. When researching music for inspiration, Jackson found that there was no "Western sound" in 1911; he felt that the soundtracks of 1960s Western films, such as Ennio Morricone's work on the Dollars Trilogy, was more representative of Western music. In appropriating the score to the game's setting, Elm commented that the process was initially "daunting", taking a long time to discover how the music was to work in an interactive way.

== Albums ==
=== Red Dead Redemption Original Soundtrack ===
Red Dead Redemption Original Soundtrack

Soundtrack album by Bill Elm and Woody Jackson
- Released: May 18, 2010
- Studios: Vox Recording, Los Angeles
- Genre: Soundtrack
- Length: 75:18
- Label: Rockstar Games
- Producer: David Holmes

Red Dead Redemption Original Soundtrack comprises songs from the game, composed and produced by Bill Elm and Woody Jackson. The soundtrack spans twenty tracks, covering a duration of 75 minutes, and features four additional vocal songs. Rockstar Games first published the album digitally via iTunes on May 18, 2010, and physically on August 23, 2010. A limited vinyl record of the soundtrack was also released on November 18, 2010, as a collaboration between Rockstar and Wax Poetics.

In the context of the game, Red Dead Redemption Original Soundtrack was well received. Simon Parkin of Eurogamer named it "standout", praising the use of multiple instruments. GamePro's Will Herring echoed these opinions, comparing the soundtrack to Ennio Morricone's Dollars Trilogy. GameSpot's Justin Calvert called the soundtrack "superb", and IGN's Erik Brudvig named it "exceptional" and "wonderful". Game Music Online praised the soundtrack as an individual piece, stating that it has the ability to accompany "any Hollywood film". Gideon Dabi of Original Sound Version felt divided about the soundtrack; though heaping praise, he wrote that it was "a little too slow on the draw".

Digital and CD track listing
No.	Title	Writer(s)	Length
1.	"Born Unto Trouble"	William Elm, Woodrow Wilson Jackson III	3:12
2.	"The Shootist"	Elm, Jackson	4:17
3.	"Dead End Alley"	Elm, Jackson	2:06
4.	"Horseplay"	Elm, Jackson	3:49
5.	"Luz y Sombra"	Elm, Jackson	5:19
6.	"El Club De Los Cuerpos"	Elm, Jackson	6:24
7.	"Estancia"	Elm, Jackson	2:02
8.	"(Theme From) Red Dead Redemption"	Elm, Jackson	5:38
9.	"Triggernometry"	Elm, Jackson	5:23
10.	"Gunplay"	Elm, Jackson	1:28
11.	"Redemption in Dub"	Elm, Jackson	2:09
12.	"Muertos Rojos (aka The Gunslinger's Lament)"	Elm, Jackson	5:50
13.	"The Outlaw's Return"	Elm, Jackson	6:54
14.	"Exodus in America"	Elm, Jackson	4:59
15.	"Already Dead"	Elm, Jackson	1:31
16.	"Far Away" (José González)	Elias Araya, José González, Tobias Winterkorn	4:39
17.	"Compass (Red Dead On Arrival Version)" (Jamie Lidell)	Jamie Lidderdale	2:59
18.	"Deadman's Gun" (Ashtar Command)	Brian Liesegang, Christopher Holmes	4:15
19.	"Bury Me Not on the Lone Prairie" (William Elliott Whitmore)		2:24
Total length:			75:18

The vinyl release of the album split it into four sides across two records and features an additional track.

Vinyl track listing Side A
No.	Title	Writer(s)	Length
1.	"Born Unto Trouble"	Elm, Jackson	3:12
2.	"The Shootist"	Elm, Jackson	4:17
3.	"Horseplay"	Elm, Jackson	3:49
4.	"The Outlaw's Return"	Elm, Jackson	6:54
5.	"Dead End Alley"	Elm, Jackson	2:06

Side B
No.	Title	Writer(s)	Length
6.	"Muertos Rojos (aka The Gunslinger's Lament)"	Elm, Jackson	5:50
7.	"Luz y Sombra"	Elm, Jackson	5:19
8.	"El Club De Los Cuerpos"	Elm, Jackson	6:24
9.	"Estancia"	Elm, Jackson	2:02
10.	"Gunplay"	Elm, Jackson	1:28

Side C
No.	Title	Writer(s)	Length
11.	"Exodus in America"	Elm, Jackson	4:59
12.	"(Theme From) Red Dead Redemption"	Elm, Jackson	5:38
13.	"Triggernometry"	Elm, Jackson	5:23
14.	"Redemption in Dub"	Elm, Jackson	2:09
15.	"Already Dead"	Elm, Jackson	1:31

Side D
No.	Title	Writer(s)	Length
16.	"Far Away" (José González)	Araya, González, Winterkorn	4:39
17.	"Compass (Red Dead On Arrival Version)" (Jamie Lidell)	Lidderdale	2:59
18.	"Deadman's Gun" (Ashtar Command)	Liesegang, Holmes	4:15
19.	"Bury Me Not on the Lone Prairie" (William Elliott Whitmore)		2:24
20.	"Old Friends, New Problems"	Elm, Jackson	3:42
Total length:			79:00

=== Red Dead Redemption: Undead Nightmare Original Soundtrack ===
Red Dead Redemption: Undead Nightmare Original Soundtrack

Soundtrack album by Bill Elm and Woody Jackson
- Released: November 23, 2010
- Studios: Vox Recording, Los Angeles
- Genre: Soundtrack
- Length: 49:01
- Label: Rockstar Games
- Producer: David Holmes

Red Dead Redemption: Undead Nightmare Original Soundtrack, the soundtrack for the downloadable content Red Dead Redemption: Undead Nightmare, features compositions from the game, composed and produced by Bill Elm and Woody Jackson. It also features works from bands Kreeps and Misterio. The soundtrack spans eighteen tracks, covering a duration of 49 minutes. Rockstar Games first published the album digitally via iTunes and Amazon Music on November 23, 2010, simultaneous with the release of Undead Nightmare, and physically on November 26, 2010.

In the context of the game, the soundtrack was generally well received. Harris Iqbal of Game Music Online praised its ability to incorporate horror and western music, stating that the soundtrack is "sometimes gimmicky and narrow in its scope, but there is still a decent amount of variety". Michael McWhertor of Kotaku called the soundtrack "gorgeous".

No.	Title	Writer(s)	Length
1.	"Undead Nightmare"	William Elm, Woodrow Wilson Jackson III	1:07
2.	"Zombie Corpseplay"	Elm, Jackson	2:54
3.	"Get Back In That Hole, Partner"	Elm, Jackson	2:36
4.	"Army of the Undead"	Elm, Jackson	2:23
5.	"Chupacabra"	Elm, Jackson	3:19
6.	"Zombie Peyote"	Elm, Jackson	1:41
7.	"Ojo Muerto"	Elm, Jackson	1:50
8.	"Blunderbuss Blues"	Elm, Jackson	1:58
9.	"Four Horses of the Apocalypse"	Elm, Jackson	5:03
10.	"Blackwater, USA"	Elm, Jackson	5:21
11.	"Undead Redemption"	Elm, Jackson	1:42
12.	"Missing Souls"	Elm, Jackson	1:32
13.	"A Man Ready for Anything"	Elm, Jackson	1:57
14.	"Showdown in Escalera"	Elm, Jackson	2:44
15.	"Bad Voodoo" (Kreeps)	Dominic James Buckley	3:41
16.	"Dead Man Walking" (Kreeps)	Buckley	3:52
17.	"Dead Sled" (Kreeps)	Buckley	2:10
18.	"Stinkin' Zombies" (Misterio)	Flavio Oscar Cianciarulo	3:11
Total length:			49:01

== Legacy ==
Red Dead Redemption won the award for Best Original Music from GameSpot, Music of the Year and Best Interactive Score at the Game Audio Network Guild Awards, and Best Original Score at the Spike Video Game Awards; the latter also awarded "Far Away" by José González with Best Song in a Game. Following the game's Windows release, it won Best Soundtrack at the Steam Awards in 2024. Gonzalez performed "Far Away" on Zane Lowe's show on BBC Radio 1 in June 2010, at the Rockstar offices in New York in July 2010, and at the Spike Video Game Awards in December 2010. The performance at the Spike Video Game Awards was accompanied by a music video for the song, which Rockstar published a few weeks later. Ashtar Command also performed a live version of the song "Deadman's Gun" in August 2010. The popularity of the game has led to numerous cover versions of the music being released by various artists, such as musician Ben "Squid Physics" Morfitt, and artist María Katt.
