= Jodi Byrd =

American Indigenous academic

- Citizenship: United States; Chickasaw Nation

Academic background
- Education: University of Nebraska–Lincoln (BA); University of Iowa (MA, PhD)
- Thesis: Colonialism's Cacophony: Natives and Arrivants at the Limits of Postcolonial Theory (2002)
- Doctoral advisor: Mary Lou Emery

Academic work
- Institutions: Cornell University; University of Illinois Urbana-Champaign; University of Hawaiʻi at Mānoa; University of Chicago

Jodi Ann Byrd is an American Indigenous academic. They are a professor in the Department of Race, Diaspora, and Indigeneity at the University of Chicago. Their research applies critical theory to Indigenous studies and governance, science and technology studies, game studies, indigenous feminism and indigenous sexualities. They also possess research interests in American Indian Studies, Post-Colonial Studies, Digital Media, Theory & Criticism.

== Personal ==
Byrd is the child of physician John Byron Byrd (1944–2008) and a great-grandniece of William L. Byrd, who served as governor of the Chickasaw Nation from 1888 to 1890 and 1890 to 1892. They are a citizen of the Chickasaw Nation.

== Education, career, and service ==
Byrd holds a master's degree and Ph.D. (2002) in English literature from the University of Iowa. Their dissertation was Colonialism's Cacophony: Natives and Arrivants at the Limits of Postcolonial Theory. Before teaching at Cornell, they taught at the University of Illinois, and before that they were an assistant professor of indigenous politics in the department of political science of the University of Hawaiʻi at Mānoa.

They were formerly associated with the American Indian Studies Program at Illinois. In the wake of the Illinois administration's failure to hire Steven Salaita into the program, whom they had championed as acting director of the program, they considered offers to move to three other universities. However, the University of Illinois persuaded them to stay and provided them an alternative position in the English and Gender and Women's Studies departments.

They are the co-editor of the Critical Insurgencies series for Northwestern University Press. They were president of the Association for the Study of American Indian Literatures for 2011–2012. In 2012, they were adopted as a Clan Sister (one of the central organizing members) of the Native American Literature Symposium, which they have stated has been an inspiring community for them since their first days as a graduate student. Byrd has also served as an editorial board member for the journal Critical Ethnic Studies.

== Awards and recognition ==
Byrd's 2011 book The Transit of Empire: Indigenous Critiques of Colonialism won the 2011 Best First Book of the Year award from the Native American and Indigenous Studies Association, and the 2012 Wordcraft Circle Award for Academic Work of the Year. Earlier, Byrd won the 2008 Beatrice Medicine Award for Scholarship in American Indian Studies of the Native American Literature Symposium for their paper "Living my native life deadly: Red Lake, Ward Churchill, and the discourses of competing genocides" (American Indian Quarterly, 2007).

== Selected works ==
=== Books ===
- The Transit of Empire: Indigenous Critiques of Colonialism (University of Minnesota Press, 2011, ISBN 978-0816676415).

=== Journal articles ===
- "Living My Native Life Deadly": Red Lake, Ward Churchill, and the Discourses of Competing Genocides
