= Studies in American Indian Literatures =

- Discipline: Native American studies
- Language: English
- Edited by: June Scudeler and Siobhan Senier

Publication details
- Former names: Newsletter of the Association for the Study of American Indian Literatures, ASAIL Newsletter
- History: 1977-present
- Publisher: University of Nebraska Press on behalf of the Association for the Study of American Indian Literatures (United States)
- Frequency: Biannual

Standard abbreviations
- ISO 4: Stud. Am. Indian Lit.

Indexing
- ISSN: 0730-3238 (print); 1548-9590 (web)
- LCCN: sf94091831
- JSTOR: 07303238
- OCLC no.: 54533161

Links
- Journal homepage; Online access at Project MUSE

Studies in American Indian Literatures is a biannual peer-reviewed academic journal covering Native American literature. It is published by the University of Nebraska Press on behalf of the Association for the Study of American Indian Literatures.

== History ==
The journal was established in 1977 as the Newsletter of the Association for the Study of American Indian Literatures and changed to ASAIL Newsletter in 1978 before the journal obtained its current title in 1980. Publication was interrupted from 1987 to 1989.

== Abstracting and indexing ==
The journal is abstracted and indexed in the Arts and Humanities Citation Index, Current Contents/Arts & Humanities, and Scopus.
