= Molly S. McGlennen =

American poet

- Born: Minneapolis, Minnesota, U.S.
- Occupation: Poet; scholar
- Education: University of California, Davis (PhD); Mills College (MFA)

Molly S. McGlennen is an American poet and scholar of Anishinaabe and European descent. She is a professor of English and Native American studies at Vassar College. She is currently the vice president of the Association for the Study of American Indian Literatures. Her book Creative Alliances: The Transnational Designs of Indigenous Women’s Poetry was winner of the Beatrice Medicine Award for Outstanding Scholarship in American Indian Studies.

McGlennen was born in Minneapolis, Minnesota. She holds a PhD in Native American studies from UC Davis and an MFA in creative writing from Mills College.

== Published works ==
=== Books ===
- Creative Alliances: The Transnational Designs of Indigenous Women’s Poetry (University of Oklahoma Press, 2014).
- Fried Fish and Flour Biscuits (Salt Publishing, 2010).

=== Work in anthologies ===
- Our Lives Are Made of Recipes in Native Voices: Indigenous American Poetry, Craft and Conversation, Eds. Dean Rader and C. Marie Fuhrman, Tupelo Press, 2019
- Snake River IV in Ghost Fishing: An Anthology of Eco-Justice Poetry, Ed. Melissa Tucky, University of Georgia Press, 2017
- Composition in Tending the Fire, Ed. Chris Felver, University of New Mexico Press, 2017
- Snake River III and “Snake River IV,” Red Ink, Spring 2015
- Bonfire I “Bonfire III,” and “Bonfire IV,” Yellow Medicine Review, Spring 2014
- Snake River V As/Us: A Space for Women of the World, Issue 3, 2014
- Snake River II and “Bonfire II,” Yellow Medicine Review, Spring 2012
- Snake River I Natural Bridge Literary Journal, No. 26, Fall 2011
- Interwoven Sing: Poetry from the Indigenous Americas (Sun Tracks): University of Arizona Press, Allison Adelle Hedge Coke (Editor), Nov. 2011
- Three Poems for Ellia Sentence, Jan. 2010
