= Woody Jackson =

American composer and session musician

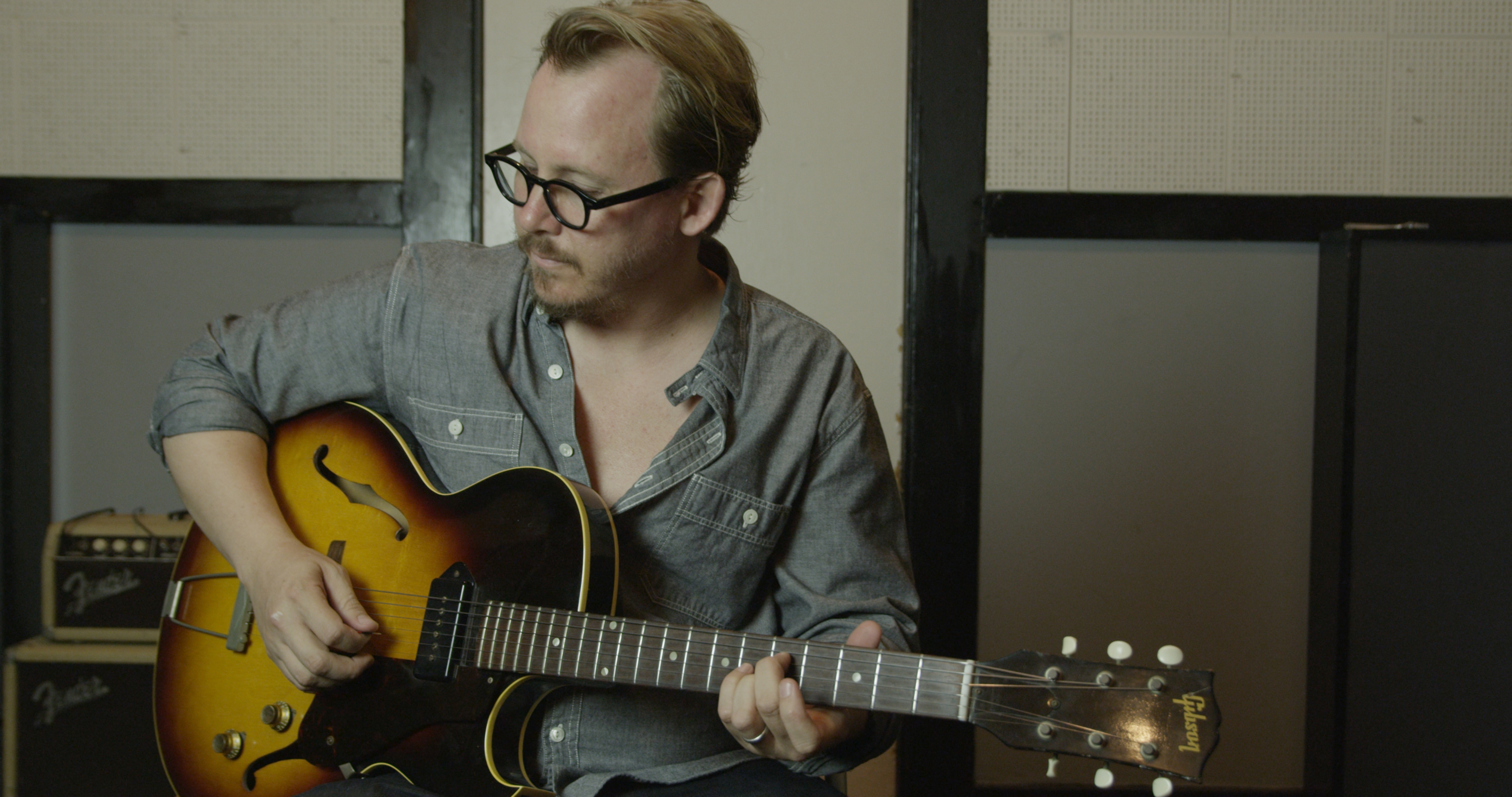
- Jackson at the 2012 IndieCade
- Born: Woodrow Wilson Jackson III; June 10, 1970 (age 55); Oil City, Pennsylvania, U.S.
- Occupations: Composer; session musician
- Years active: 1995–present
- Spouse: Sharon Sheinwold (m. 2010)
- Children: 3
- Website: woodyjacksonmusic.com

Woodrow Wilson Jackson III (born June 10, 1970) is an American composer and session musician. He is best known for his work with Rockstar Games, composing scores for its video games Red Dead Redemption, L.A. Noire, Grand Theft Auto V, and Red Dead Redemption 2. Born in Oil City, Pennsylvania, Jackson studied at Virginia State University for one year, taking harmonica lessons before dropping out and playing guitar in a band. He moved to Los Angeles in 1992, and eventually joined the band Friends of Dean Martinez. He later became a session musician, working on the soundtracks of films like Ocean's Twelve (2004) and The Devil Wears Prada (2006). Since 2009, he has owned and operated Electro-Vox Recording Studios, where he has recorded two original albums and much of his composing work. He is an avid collector of vintage instruments.

Jackson began working with Rockstar Games in 2008, joining Bill Elm to co-compose the music of Red Dead Redemption, partly inspired by Ennio Morricone's work on the Dollars Trilogy. They returned to compose the score for the downloadable content campaign Undead Nightmare in 2010, and Jackson provided additional in-game music for L.A. Noire in 2011. For the music of Grand Theft Auto V, he collaborated with the Alchemist, Oh No, and Tangerine Dream. Jackson continued working with Rockstar for the music of Red Dead Redemption 2, composing roughly 60 hours of music over five years. His work on Rockstar's games has been praised, and he has received awards from the Game Audio Network Guild Awards, Game Developers Choice Awards, Spike Video Game Awards, and the Game Awards.

== Early life and education ==
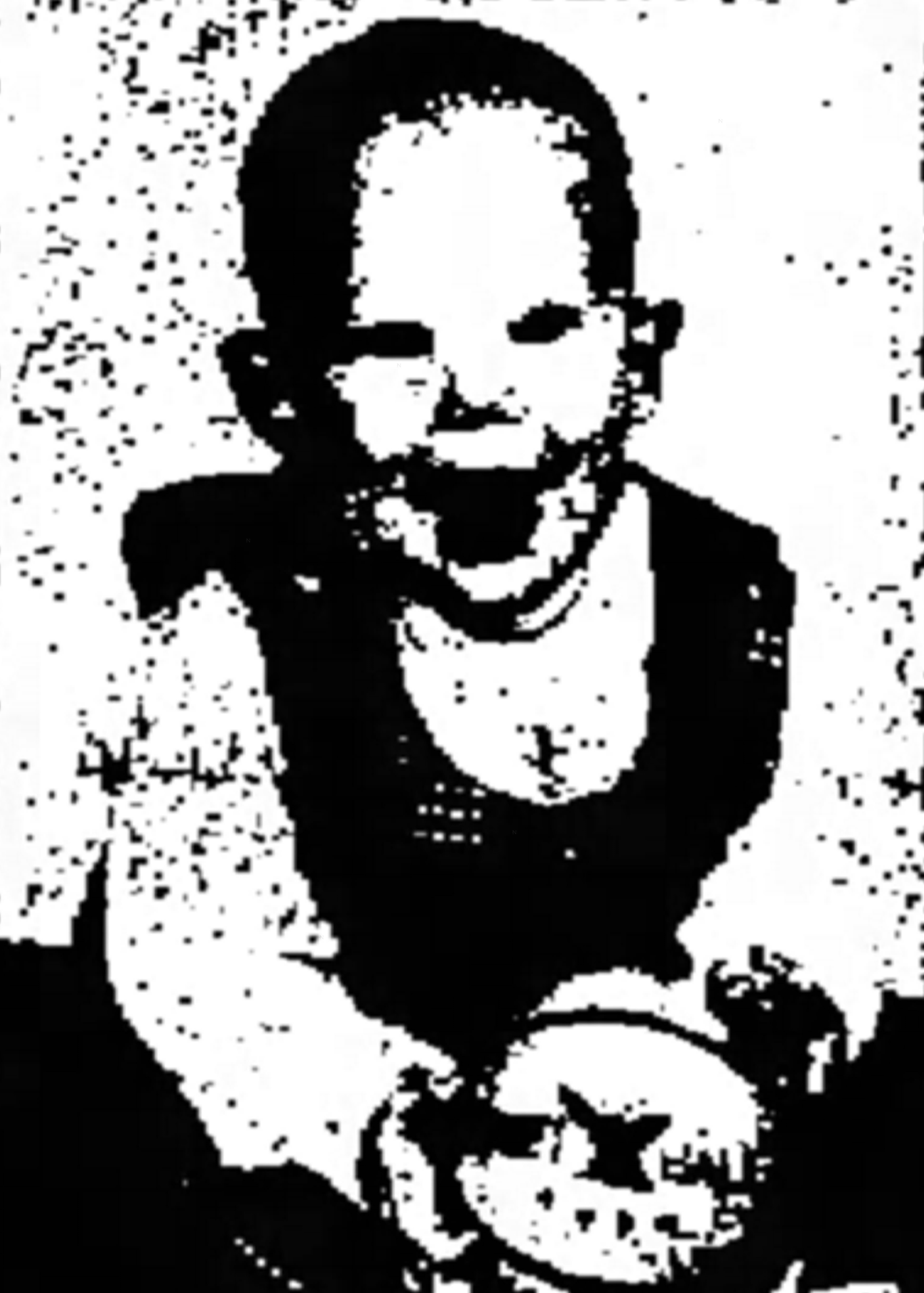
Jackson in an image celebrating his first birthday in 1971

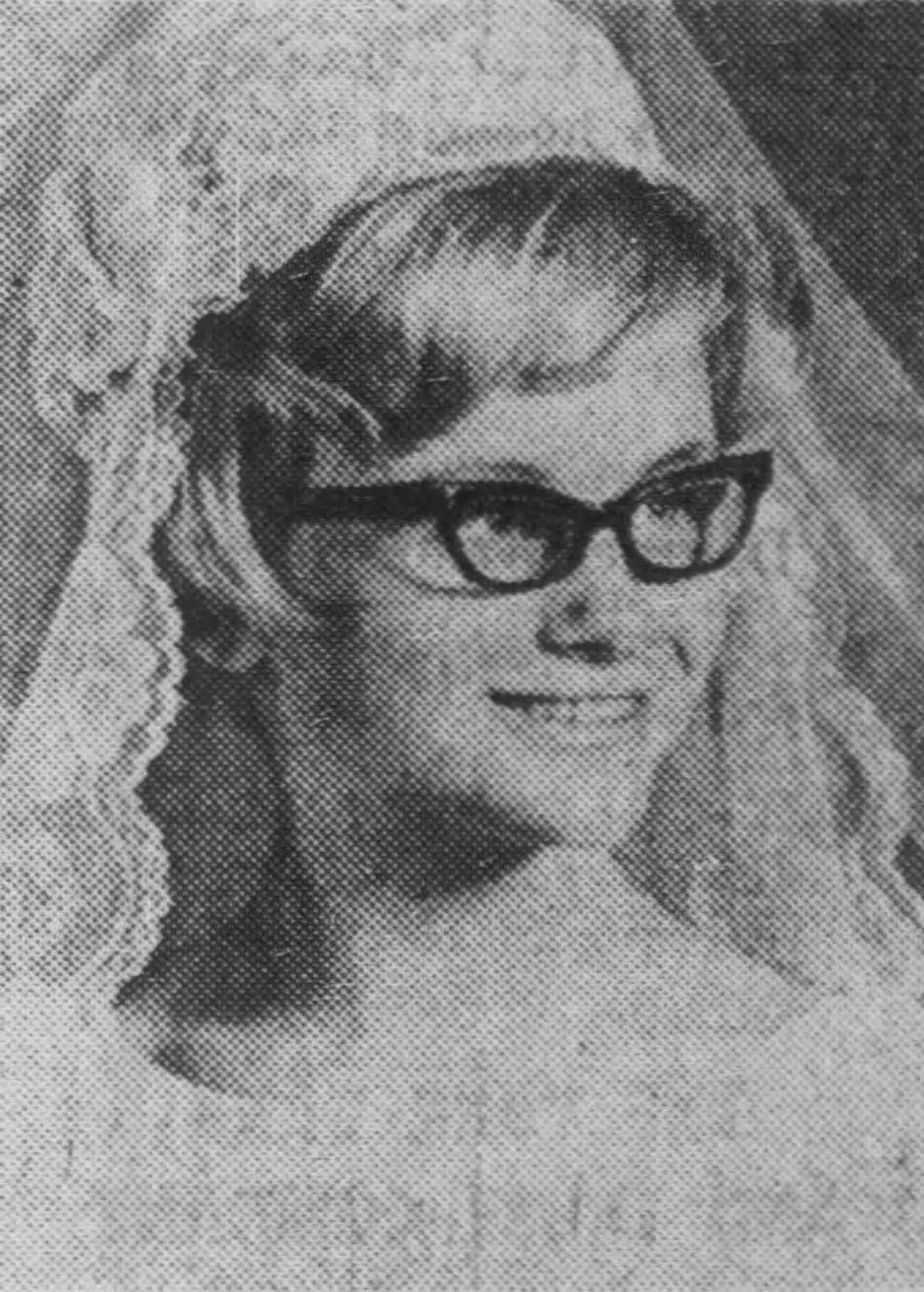
Jackson's mother Linda Sue (née Fitzner) in 1969

Woodrow Wilson Jackson III was born in Oil City, Pennsylvania, on June 10, 1970, to Linda Sue Jackson (née Fitzner) and Woodrow Wilson Jackson Jr. Jackson was raised in York, Pennsylvania, and Richmond, Virginia. He was often inspired by artists such as Tom Waits while growing up. Jackson attended William Penn High School, at which he was an honors student in his final year in 1988, and studied at Virginia State University for one year, where he took harmonica lessons, before transferring to study under Ellis Marsalis Jr. He eventually dropped out when his funds were depleted, and turned to playing guitar with the blues band the Useless Playboys, often performing as the opening act for the Reverend Horton Heat. He performed for one day as part of the United States Navy Band.

== Career ==
In 1992, shortly after the Los Angeles riots, Jackson moved from Richmond to Los Angeles. He performed in the group Hotel X, which released its album Engendered Species with SST Records in 1994; he also toured with the Useless Playboys around this time, alongside Mike Geier. In 1995, Jackson collaborated with musician Bill Elm, who introduced him to the band Friends of Dean Martinez. Jackson eventually acted as a fill-in for an absent guitar player before remaining with the band as a full member for some time. He also worked for McCabe's Guitar Shop for several years, where he learned how to play chromatic harmonica in one lesson from Dave Gage. Jackson co-composed the scores for the films Men Cry Bullets (1998) with Ivan Knight and Forest Dunn, and The Last Man (2000) with Knight, and contributed music to the soundtracks for The Invisible Circus (2001), Bewitched (2005), Fast Food Nation (2006) with Elm as part of Friends of Dean Martinez, and Youth in Revolt (2009) with Petra Haden. As a session musician, he worked on the soundtracks of films like Ocean's Twelve (2004), Fun with Dick and Jane, and The Devil Wears Prada (2006). Jackson appears in the documentary film Moog (2004), performing alongside Money Mark.

Jackson spent around six years "searching for a new sound that no one ever had heard"; he crafted his own guitorgan by connecting a Chamberlin keyboard to a guitar, an instrument he later used on films such as Ocean's Twelve and Ocean's Thirteen (2007). Jackson's musical style has been described as a "smooth blend of Krautrock, funk, ambient and brick-smashing instrumental rap". In 2008, Jackson and Haden released the album Ten Years, titled after the length of time it was in production. Around 2009, Jackson took over Melrose Avenue-based Electro-Vox Recording Studios, which was established in 1931 and is said to be the oldest privately held recording studio in the United States. Jackson is an avid collector of vintage instruments and recording equipment for the studio. Around 2010, Jackson was working on instrument restoration with the family of Harry Chamberlin, inventor of the Chamberlin keyboard. Jackson is featured in Melodrama: The Mellotron Movie (2010), a documentary directed by Dianna Dilworth about the Chamberlin.

In 2008, video game company Rockstar Games signed Jackson to co-compose the music for Red Dead Redemption (2010), together with Elm. They composed approximately 200 tracks for the game over 15 months, partly at Electro-Vox, the first project Jackson worked on as owner of the studio. When researching music for inspiration, Jackson found there was no contemporaneous "Western sound"; he felt the soundtracks of 1960s Western films, such as Ennio Morricone's work on the Dollars Trilogy, was more representative of Western music. Shortly after finding a German guitar in Los Angeles with the appropriate sound and "a perfect tremolo", Jackson returned home and wrote the main theme. While experimenting for the game's northern region, Jackson recorded the heartbeat of his unborn daughter using his iPhone. Jackson collaborated with Tommy Morgan, whom he had met while working on Ocean's Thirteen, on the harmonica tracks. Jackson worked with David Holmes—with whom he had worked on films like Ocean's Twelve and Ocean's Thirteen—to produce the soundtrack. The score was praised by critics, receiving favorable comparisons to Morricone's work; it won awards from GameSpot, the Game Audio Network Guild Awards, and the Spike Video Game Awards.

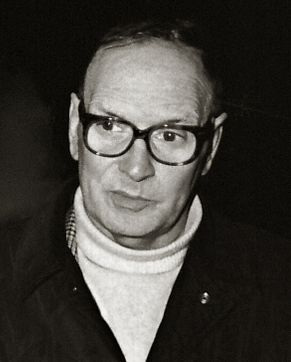
Ennio Morricone

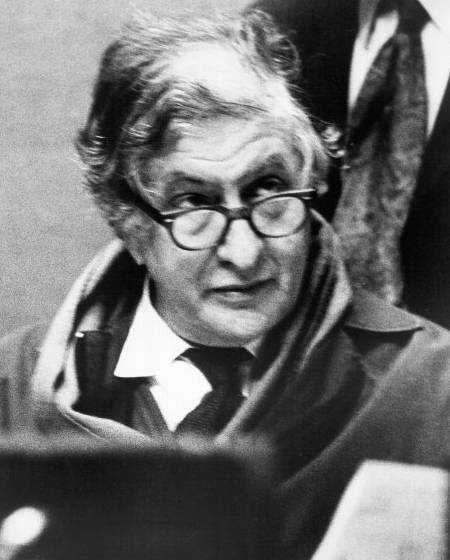
Bernard Herrmann

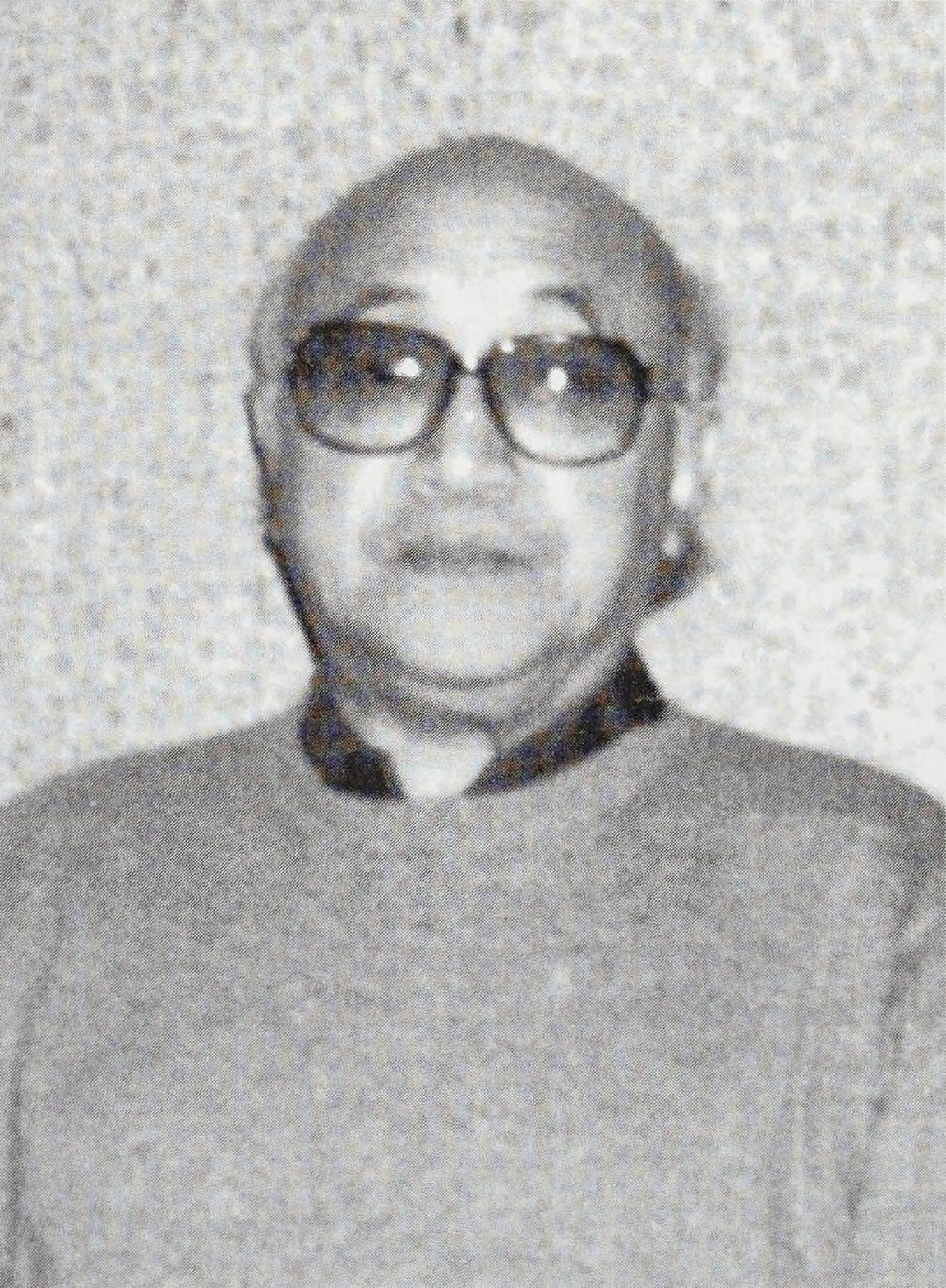
Masaru Sato

Jackson has cited several inspirations for his work, including Morricone for Red Dead Redemption, Herrmann for L.A. Noire, and Sato for Red Dead Redemption 2.

Jackson and Elm returned to compose the score for Undead Nightmare (2010), a downloadable content campaign for Red Dead Redemption. For Undead Nightmare, he sampled several tracks from the original game using E-mu SP-1200, which he discovered from Money Mark. Jackson provided the reassembled music to Elm before going on tour with Vincent Gallo; when he returned from tour, the score was finalized. It was generally well-received in the context of the game. Jackson continued working with Rockstar by providing additional incidental music and sounds for L.A. Noire (2011), and additional production and studio provision for Max Payne 3 (2012). For L.A. Noire, Jackson re-orchestrated one of the themes and wrote much of the in-game music. While the game's score largely uses a live orchestra, Jackson found this led to difficulties with interactive music as the player can hear the loop; inspired by film noir and the works of musicians like Bernard Herrmann, Jackson departed from the existing music and wrote original tracks in about a month. L.A. Noire's music was ultimately awarded at the British Academy Games Awards and the Game Audio Network Guild Awards.

In 2011, Jackson contributed the song "Moshi Moshi", recorded at Electro-Vox, to the charity album Play for Japan: The Album; the title was inspired by the manner in which Masa Tsuzuki—Jackson's audio engineer for L.A. Noire—would answer the telephone. Proceeds from the album went to the Japanese Red Cross Society following the 2011 Tōhoku earthquake and tsunami; Jackson had recently spent some time in the country, where he met the album's producer Akira Yamaoka. Jayson Napolitano of Original Sound Version described Jackson's song as "a contemplative, lumbering piece of music that says a lot with few notes". He also composed the music for The Real Rocky (2011), a television film broadcast as part of the series 30 for 30. In 2012, Jackson provided songs for Good Vibrations and ModNation Racers: Road Trip and additional music for the first season of Nashville with T Bone Burnett. Jason Schwartzman engaged Jackson to co-compose the scores for the short film Here and feature film Goats (both 2012) with him; they had been close friends for about fifteen years, having bonded over their mutual love of music since Schwartzman was around 17 years old. Jackson released an original album, Dos Manos, in Italy in July 2012, produced by Holmes and published by Interbang Records and Brutture Moderne.

Jackson later worked in a team of producers for the music of Rockstar's Grand Theft Auto V (2013), collaborating with the Alchemist, Oh No, and Tangerine Dream. Jackson's initial role was to provide the score for Trevor Philips's missions, and he took influence from artists such as the Mars Volta and Queens of the Stone Age. When he learnt the team would be building off each other's work, he voiced concern that the finished product could be disjointed. After sharing his work with the team, he was particularly impressed by the contributions by Edgar Froese, Tangerine Dream's founding member. Froese had interpolated funk sounds with Jackson's hip-hop influences. Froese and Jackson then sent their work between the Alchemist and Oh No, who heavily sampled it. To compose his part of the score, Jackson created a supergroup called Jaws, featuring himself, Keefus Ciancia, Deantoni Parks, Gus Seyffert, and Michael Shuman. The score was well-received in the context of the game. For the soundtrack release, Jackson filtered through the six terabytes of material before transferring it to DJ Shadow for mixing. Alongside the Alchemist, Oh No, and Tangerine Dream, Jackson co-presented a 70-minute live concert featuring the original score at the New York Film Festival in September 2013.

Ivan Pavlovich, director of music and audio at Rockstar, invited Jackson to work as the composer for Red Dead Redemption 2 (2018) around Grand Theft Auto V's release. Jackson composed roughly 60 hours of music for the game over five years, though several were cut; the game has 192 interactive mission tracks. Jackson was inspired by the music of 1950s samurai films, particularly Masaru Sato's work on Akira Kurosawa's films, as well as the television series Kung Fu (1972–1975) and the Hollywood session musicians of the 1950s–1970s. Jackson listened to the music while shooting at a target range using a gun from the game's time period, and purchased several instruments from the Wrecking Crew that were featured on classic cowboy films, such as Dennis Budimir's 1898 Martin 1–28 gut string and Tommy Tedesco's Harmina Salinas Hijas gut string. He acquired a 1920s Gibson Mandobass used on Bullitt (1968) that recreated an "ominous" bell sound, ukuleles from Butch Cassidy and the Sundance Kid (1969), and a nylon guitar used on Unforgiven (1992). Jackson gathered musician friends like Haden, bassist Mike Watt, and drummer Jon Theodore for jam sessions, often using Jackson's old instruments. Critics praised his work; it won awards from Giant Bomb, IGN, the Game Awards, Hollywood Music in Media Awards, and Titanium Awards, and received nominations at the New York Game Awards and SXSW Gaming Awards. The original score was released digitally in August 2019, and physically in April 2020. Jackson led an hour-long live performance of the soundtrack at the Red Bull Music Festival in Los Angeles in February 2019.

In June 2020, Jackson released his first original solo album, Tres Flores, alongside a digital re-release of Dos Manos. On August 23, 2024, he released an instrumental album, Cowboy Yoga, performing alongside Jay Bellerose, Jennifer Condos, and Bill Frisell, and featuring guest appearances from Jackson's son Zach, Gabe Noel, Marc Ribot, and Sebastian Steinberg. It is the first in a planned trilogy. The second, Way Out West, was released in 2025, preceded by the single "Song for the Whales".

== Personal life ==
Jackson is a baptized Mormon. In 2010, Jackson married Sharon Sheinwold, a talent manager for Ocean Avenue Entertainment, who formerly worked as a talent agent and partner for United Talent Agency from 1992 to 2008, and for William Morris Endeavor (formerly Endeavor Talent Agency) from 2008 to 2021. They met at Largo in Los Angeles. The couple formerly occupied a home in the Nichols Canyon neighborhood of Los Angeles; they bought the property for US$925,000 in 2003 and sold it in June 2017 for $3.29 million. In 2021, Jackson lived in Tucson, Arizona. He has a son named Zach, who performed the French horn on Cowboy Yoga, and two daughters, who were credited for musical contributions to Red Dead Redemption, Grand Theft Auto V, and Red Dead Redemption 2.

== Works ==
=== Albums ===
Year	Title	Notes
2008	Ten Years	With Petra Haden
2012	Dos Manos	Released in Italy; re-released digitally in 2020
2020	Tres Flores	First solo album
2024	Cowboy Yoga	First in a planned trilogy
2025	Way Out West	Second in a planned trilogy

=== Singles ===
Year	Title	Album
2019	"Outlaws From the West"	The Music of Red Dead Redemption 2 (Original Score)
2019	"Fleeting Joy"	The Music of Red Dead Redemption 2 (Original Score)
2019	"Country Pursuits"	The Music of Red Dead Redemption 2 (Original Score)
2025	"Song for the Whales"	Way Out West

=== Video games ===
Year	Title	Role(s)
2010	Red Dead Redemption	Composer, with Bill Elm
2010	Undead Nightmare	Composer, with Bill Elm
2011	L.A. Noire	Incidental music
2012	ModNation Racers: Road Trip	Song: "Le jeune jus"
2012	Max Payne 3	Additional production, studio provision
2013	Grand Theft Auto V	Composer, with the Alchemist, Oh No, and Tangerine Dream
2018	Red Dead Redemption 2	Composer, producer

=== Film ===
Year	Title	Role(s)
1998	Men Cry Bullets	Co-composer (credited as Woodrow Jackson), with Ivan Knight and Forest Dunn
2000	The Last Man	Co-composer, with Ivan Knight
2012	Here (short film)	Co-composer, with Jason Schwartzman
2012	Goats	Co-composer, with Jason Schwartzman

=== Television ===
Year	Title	Role(s)
2011	30 for 30	Episode: The Real Rocky
2012	Nashville	Additional music for the first season, with T Bone Burnett

=== Other ===
Year	Title	Role(s)
2011	Play for Japan: The Album	Song: "Moshi Moshi"

== Awards and nominations ==
Date	Award / Publication	Category	Work	Result	Ref.
December 10, 2010	Inside Gaming Awards	Best Original Score	Red Dead Redemption (Note: Co-nominated with Bill Elm)	Won	
December 11, 2010	Spike Video Game Awards	Best Original Score	Red Dead Redemption	Won	
December 20, 2010	GameSpot	Best Original Music	Red Dead Redemption	Won	
March 3, 2011	Game Developers Choice Awards	Best Audio (Note: Co-nominated with audio designers and audio programmers)	Red Dead Redemption	Won	
March 3, 2011	Game Audio Network Guild Awards	Audio of the Year	Red Dead Redemption	Won	
March 3, 2011	Game Audio Network Guild Awards	Music of the Year	Red Dead Redemption	Won	
March 3, 2011	Game Audio Network Guild Awards	Best Interactive Score	Red Dead Redemption	Won	
March 3, 2011	Game Audio Network Guild Awards	Rookie of the Year	Red Dead Redemption	Won	
March 3, 2011	Game Audio Network Guild Awards	Best Soundtrack Album	Red Dead Redemption	Nominated	
March 3, 2011	Game Audio Network Guild Awards	Best Original Instrumental ("Main Theme")	Red Dead Redemption	Nominated	
December 7, 2013	VGX	Best Soundtrack	Grand Theft Auto V (Note: Co-nominated with the Alchemist, Oh No, and Tangerine Dream)	Won	
December 6, 2018	The Game Awards	Best Score/Music	Red Dead Redemption 2	Won	
December 10, 2018	Titanium Awards	Best Original Soundtrack	Red Dead Redemption 2	Won	
January 22, 2019	New York Game Awards	Tin Pan Alley Award for Best Music in a Game	Red Dead Redemption 2	Nominated	
March 16, 2019	SXSW Gaming Awards	Excellence in Musical Score	Red Dead Redemption 2	Nominated	
March 20, 2019	Game Developers Choice Awards	Best Audio	Red Dead Redemption 2	Nominated	
March 21, 2019	Game Audio Network Guild Awards	G.A.N.G. / MAGFEST People's Choice Award	Red Dead Redemption 2	Nominated	
November 20, 2019	Hollywood Music in Media Awards	Soundtrack Album	Red Dead Redemption 2	Won	
