= Play for Japan: The Album =

Compilation album by Various artists
- Released: July 15, 2011
- Label: Sumthing Else Music Works

Play for Japan: The Album is charity compilation album created by video game composers to benefit relief efforts for the 2011 Tōhoku earthquake and tsunami. It was conceived by Akira Yamaoka and was released digitally on July 15, 2011.

== Track list ==
1. Nobuko Toda – "Reminiscence"
2. Laura Shigihara – "Jump"
3. Penka Kouneva – "White Cloud"
4. Tommy Tallarico – "Greater Lights"
5. Mitsuto Suzuki – "Play for You"
6. Jason Graves – "Necromancer"
7. Woody Jackson – "Moshi Moshi"
8. Akira Yamaoka – "Ex Animo"
9. Sean Murray – "The Temple Stone"
10. Laura Karpman – "Pine Wind Sound"
11. Nobuo Uematsu – "Every New Morning"
12. Bear McCreary – "Maverick Regeneration"
13. Hip Tanaka – "HVC-1384"
14. Chance Thomas – "Rise Up"
15. Arthur Inasi – "We Are One"
16. Inon Zur – "Remember"
17. Koji Kondo – "Super Mario Medley On Two Pianos"
18. Yasunori Mitsuda – "Dimension Break"
