= Red Dead Redemption =

2010 video game

- Developer: Rockstar San Diego (Note: Additional work by Rockstar North, Rockstar Leeds, and Rockstar New England. Nintendo Switch, PlayStation 4, and Windows versions developed by Double Eleven, who developed the Nintendo Switch 2, PlayStation 5, and Xbox Series X/S versions in collaboration with Cast Iron Games.)
- Publisher: Rockstar Games
- Producers: Steve Martin; Josh Needleman; David Kunkler
- Designers: Christian Cantamessa; Leslie Benzies
- Programmer: Ted Carson
- Artists: Joshua Bass; Daren Bader; Nick Trifunovic
- Writers: Dan Houser; Michael Unsworth; Christian Cantamessa
- Composers: Bill Elm; Woody Jackson
- Series: Red Dead
- Engine: RAGE
- Platforms: PlayStation 3 Xbox 360: Nintendo Switch; PlayStation 4; Windows; Android; iOS; Nintendo Switch 2; PlayStation 5; Xbox Series X/S
- Release: May 18, 2010: PlayStation 3, Xbox 360; NA: May 18, 2010; PAL: May 21, 2010; Switch, PlayStation 4; WW: August 17, 2023; Windows; WW: October 29, 2024; Android, iOS, Switch 2, PS5, Xbox Series X/S; WW: December 2, 2025
- Genre: Action-adventure
- Modes: Single-player, multiplayer

Red Dead Redemption is a 2010 action-adventure game developed by Rockstar San Diego and published by Rockstar Games. A successor to 2004's Red Dead Revolver, it is the second game in the Red Dead series. Red Dead Redemption is set during the decline of the American frontier in the year 1911. It follows John Marston, a former outlaw who, after his wife and son are taken hostage by the government in ransom for his services as a hired gun, sets out to bring three members of his former gang to justice. The narrative explores themes of the cycle of violence, masculinity, redemption, and the American Dream.

The game is played from a third-person perspective. The player can freely roam in its interactive open world, a fictionalized version of the Western United States and Northern Mexico, primarily by horseback, and on foot. Gunfights emphasize a gunslinger gameplay mechanic called "Dead Eye" that allows players to mark multiple shooting targets on enemies in slow motion. The game uses a morality system by which the player's actions affect their character's levels of honor, fame, and how other characters respond to the player. An online multiplayer mode is included with the original release, allowing up to 16 players to engage in both cooperative and competitive gameplay in a recreation of the single-player setting.

The game's development lasted over five years, and it became one of the most expensive video games ever made. Rockstar improved its proprietary game engine to increase its technological capabilities. The development team conducted extensive research, including field trips to Washington, D.C. and analyzing classic Western films, to achieve realism for the game. The team hired professional actors to perform the body movements through motion capture. Red Dead Redemption features an original score composed by Bill Elm and Woody Jackson. The game's development received controversy following accusations of unethical working practices. The studio's working hours and managerial style were met with public complaints from staff members.

Red Dead Redemption was released for the PlayStation 3 and Xbox 360 in May 2010, for the Nintendo Switch and PlayStation 4 in August 2023, for Windows in October 2024, and for Android, iOS, Nintendo Switch 2, PlayStation 5, and Xbox Series X/S in December 2025. It received critical acclaim for its visuals, music, performances, gameplay, and narrative. It won year-end accolades, including Game of the Year awards from several gaming publications, and is considered one of seventh-generation console gaming's most significant titles and among the greatest video games ever made. It has shipped over 25 million copies. Several downloadable content additions were released; Undead Nightmare added a new single-player campaign in which Marston searches for a cure for an infectious zombie plague. A prequel, Red Dead Redemption 2, was released in October 2018.

== Gameplay ==
Red Dead Redemption is a Western-themed action-adventure game played from a third-person perspective. The player controls John Marston and completes missions—linear scenarios with set objectives—to progress through the story; in the epilogue, they control John's son Jack. Outside of missions, the player may freely roam the open world, consisting of the American states New Austin and West Elizabeth—fictionalized versions of the Western United States—and the fictional Mexican state Nuevo Paraíso. Different breeds of horses are the main forms of transportation, each with different attributes. Horses must be tamed in the wild, stolen, or purchased. The player can utilize trains and carriages for quick travel. Undeveloped land features rugged and vast landscapes with occasional travelers, bandits, and wildlife. Urban settlements range from isolated farmhouses to crowded towns.

Red Dead Redemption features a cover system that lets the player hide behind objects and reach out to fire on people and animals.

The player can witness and partake in random events, including public hangings, ambushes, pleas for assistance, encounters with strangers, ride-by shootings, and dangerous animal attacks. Optional side activities include dueling, bounty hunting, herb collecting, gambling, and hunting. Red Dead Redemption uses an Honor system, which is increased by morally positive deeds, such as capturing an outlaw alive or saving a stranger, and decreased by negative choices like murder. The Fame system affects how non-player characters (NPCs) react to the player based on Honor. If the player has high Honor, NPCs will greet them and they will receive discounts in some stores; if low, NPCs will act insecure and establishments may close their doors. The player can disguise by wearing a bandana when performing criminal acts.

Gunfights are an essential gameplay mechanic. The player can take cover, target a specific person or animal, blindfire, and free aim. Individual body parts can be targeted to take down targets non-lethally. Weapons include revolvers, pistols, rifles, shotguns, knives, explosives, and lassos. Aiming utilizes a gunslinger gameplay mechanic known as Dead Eye, a targeting system allowing the player to slow down time and mark targets. Once the targeting sequence ends, the player fires to all marked locations in quick succession. The Dead Eye system upgrades and grants more abilities as the player progresses.

The game introduces the bounty system, a crime-governing mechanic inspired by Grand Theft Auto's wanted system. When the player commits a crime, witnesses run to the nearest police station; the player can bribe or kill them before they reach the station, negating consequences. Once the law is alerted, the Wanted meter appears with a bounty set on the player's head. The bounty grows higher as the player commits more crimes, and more lawmen will be sent to hunt them; after committing enough crime, the U.S. Marshals or Mexican Army will be sent. To evade law enforcement in pursuit, the player must escape a circular zone or kill all lawmen in a town. If the player escapes, bounty hunters will continue to track them. The bounty will remain on their head until they pay it at a telegraph station or present a pardon letter.

The online multiplayer allows up to 16 players to engage in competitive and cooperative gameplay in a recreation of the single-player setting. Each game begins with a Mexican standoff, of which the survivors move to any part of the battlefield in preparation for respawning enemies. Event types include deathmatch scenarios and capture the flag variants. Crates contain extra weapons, ammo, and other powerups. Players can level up and complete weapon challenges to earn rewards such as new character models, golden weapon skins, new titles, and new breeds of animal mounts. Multiplayer features open-world gameplay, wherein players can form or join a group of up to eight players in a "posse" group and partake in hunting or attacking other gangs or posses. In some game modes, players are unable to kill each other. (Note: Rockstar addressed the game's griefing problem by introducing a Friendly Free Roam in an update on October 23, 2010.)

== Plot ==
In 1911, former outlaw John Marston (Rob Wiethoff) is forced by Bureau of Investigation agents Edgar Ross (Jim Bentley) and Archer Fordham (David Wilson Barnes) to hunt down his former gang members in exchange for his family's return. John first pursues former ally Bill Williamson (Steve J. Palmer), who now leads his own gang that terrorizes New Austin. He arrives at Williamson's stronghold at Fort Mercer, but ends up getting shot and left for dead after unsuccessfully persuading him to surrender. Rescued and nursed back to health by local rancher Bonnie MacFarlane (Kimberly Irion), he helps her with several jobs around her farm in return, while formulating a plan to attack Williamson's gang. John makes many allies to help him carry out the attack, including U.S. Marshal Leigh Johnson (Anthony De Longis), con artist Nigel West Dickens (Don Creech), grave robber and treasure hunter Seth Briars (Kevin Glikmann), and an alcoholic arms smuggler known as "Irish" (K. Harrison Sweeney). Ultimately, John and his allies storm Fort Mercer and kill all of Williamson's men but learn that Williamson himself has fled to Mexico to seek help from another former gang member, Javier Escuella (Antonio Jaramillo). John parts ways with his allies and travels to Mexico with Irish's help.

Upon his arrival in Nuevo Paraíso, John meets legendary gunslinger Landon Ricketts (Ross Hagen), who helps him improve his shooting skills. He becomes involved in a local civil war between Colonel Agustín Allende (Gary Carlos Cervantes), the state's tyrannical governor, and Abraham Reyes (Josh Segarra), the leader of a rebellion against Allende's government. John works with both sides in exchange for help in tracking down his targets. When Allende turns on him, John is rescued by Reyes and vows to aid the rebels in exchange for Reyes's help in finding Williamson and Escuella. During a raid on a Mexican Army fortress, the rebels help him find the latter, who reveals that Williamson is under Allende's protection. John can then choose to either turn Escuella over to Ross and Fordham or kill him and give them his body. Reyes eventually leads an assault on Allende's palace, and John helps him chase and execute Allende and Williamson when they attempt to flee. Leaving Reyes to rule Nuevo Paraíso and lead his revolution to Mexico's capital, John returns to the United States.

In Blackwater, Ross and Fordham coerce John into helping them track down Dutch van der Linde (Benjamin Byron Davis), a charismatic anarchist and John's former gang's leader and mentor. Dutch has recently formed a gang with disaffected Native Americans, with whom he shares a hatred for the government and modernization. Aided by Ross's associates, John finds Dutch's stronghold in the mountains. After helping Ross and Fordham thwart Dutch's robbery of the Blackwater Bank, John partakes in the U.S. Army's assault on the stronghold. Chased to a cliff, Dutch concedes defeat, warns John that the government will not give him peace, and dies by suicide. Afterward, Ross honors their agreement and releases John’s family.

Returning to his ranch, John reunites with his wife Abigail (Sophia Marzocchi), son Jack (Josh Blaylock), and former gang member and close friend Uncle (Spider Madison) to attempt an honest life again. However, this peace is short-lived as Ross betrays John and leads a U.S. Army unit in an attack on his ranch. John tries to fend them off, but the attacking force is too large, and Uncle is killed. John helps his family escape and stays to face the attackers, who kill him and leave. Upon hearing the gunshots, Abigail and Jack return to the ranch, mourn John, and bury him. In 1914, Jack buries Abigail next to John after she dies, before tracking down a now-retired Ross to confront him about John's death. Jack kills Ross in a duel and walks away.

== Themes and analysis ==
Jack Marston's adoption of his father's outlaw status in the game's ending has been viewed as commentary on the theme of redemption: as a manifestation of it; the tragic irony of it; or of its absence and impossibility, and instead the inevitability to repeat the cycle of violence.

Red Dead Redemption explores themes of the cycle of violence, faith, governmental control, law and order, the loss of innocence and freedom, manifest destiny, masculinity, social change, and redemption, and is noted for its representation of Native Americans and violence. IGN's Erik Brudvig considered the game a commentary on modern political issues such as racism and immigration; writer Dan Houser said the story was not intended as a satire of contemporary America but parallels were inevitable due to the similarities of the time period. Some scholars identified the game conforms to neoliberal values, particularly in its depoliticizing of the sufferers of corporate greed, though others felt it ridicules the selfishness of neoliberals. Matt Margini described the narrative as a tragedy, citing Aristotle's proposal that the hero is neither good nor evil and "tragic heroes are tragic because they bring about their own fall, despite having good intentions".

Several scholars noted that, despite the use of the word "redemption" in the title, such a feat was impossible for John; Reid McCarter of Bullet Points Monthly described the word as "bitterly ironic" due to the inability of reinvention for both the characters and country. Margini wrote the final chapter allowed the player to feel they achieved the promised redemption, only for it to be taken away by the story's end. Conversely, Kotaku's Heather Alexandra felt John achieved his redemption upon sacrificing himself to save his family. Benjamin J. Triana found that, while John's death "implies transcendence", it is not overtly sacrificial, nor does it represent John as a hero. Gamasutra's Richard Clark considered the depiction of redemption "cynical and overly simple". Red Dead Redemption explores the impacts of the cycle of violence, most notably represented through Jack's continuation of his father's failures by adopting the outlaw status. NPR's Jason Sheehan considered the game a tale of "the senselessness of violence used to solve violence begetting only more violence". M. Melissa Elston found, like other modern media, it attempts to "reframe the violence and simplistic moral dualism of previous pop-cultural representations of the Old West". The game drew some commentary for its depiction of violence; Margini considered it justifiable since "violence means something", and Timothy J. Welsh added it is "just a game", but recognized the worrisome nihilism it could perpetuate if generalized. Conversely, Christopher Bartel expressed hesitancy at the moral justification of virtual murder and noted "even hard-core gamers might balk at virtual sadism".

The game presents the ethos of the American Dream in its formation, in contrast with the modern-day representation in Grand Theft Auto IV (2008). While John's violent past rendered him unable to achieve redemption, it also impacted his son's ability to achieve the American Dream as he chooses to become an outlaw like his father. The game features commentary on freedom and control, and the manner in which societal change acts as a catalyst for losing one's control and compromising their morality. The journey from the open fields to the city of Blackwater represents civilization's control over the natural world, though the player lacks control during the opening sequence in which John leaves Blackwater, only gaining it when reentering the city later in the game. Nick Robinson felt John's horse reflected his freedom and comfortability, while traveling with the government agents via car represented him "as literally and figuratively trapped by technology". While Red Dead Redemption grants the player freedom, they ultimately lack control over the narrative as "being free to do things is not the same as being able to change things", an ideology reflected in John's inability to prevent his own death. Triana felt the ending allowed the player to properly understand John's rejection of a developing society due to the misery endured from the government. The game demonstrates the disparities of economic inequality; Sara Humphreys identified a connection between MacFarlane's Ranch and the class conflict of Johnson County, Wyoming in the late nineteenth century.

Presented in marketing materials as a traditional cowboy—isolated and violent, a "white, heteronormative, rugged individual"—John's behavior and ambitions in the narrative are generally unconventional. His ambiguity and internal conflict lead him to exhibit "weariness more than manliness". Regardless, he occasionally perpetuates stereotypes; he continues to preserve lives in missions for the government despite his bitter opposition to them, described as an enactment of Theodore Roosevelt's masculine ideals. Triana considered the game's masculinity plural, with the male lead generally pitted against other men, though recognized the dominance of the characters shifted throughout the narrative. He found John's challenges reflected those of straight, cisgender men in the modern era. Margini blamed John's downfall on "the false promises of a world built on hypermasculine ideals", emphasized by his unsuccessful attempts to adopt a new form of masculinity and play an empathetic father to Jack, while Robinson deemed John a victim of government agents who force him into violence "yet ultimately destroy him". WiderScreen's Juho Tuominen and Olli Sotamaa described John as an idealist and Jack as "the educated youth, a version of a new kind of woke man". Female representation is mixed; Bonnie is presented as "insightful and resourceful" instead of simply "a woman masquerading as a male figure", though still defers to simple domestic tasks in her father's presence and on one occasion becomes a damsel in distress. Meanwhile, Abigail is presented as "the good prostitute who serves as a handmaiden" and later becomes "the nagging wife", and other female characters exist simply to reflect back onto John, both positively and negatively.

In further opposition with the American Dream, the game's representation of Native Americans is bleak, cruel, and violent. Jodi Byrd believed "Red Dead" signaled the Native American genocide. Bullet Points's McCarter felt, while the killing of Native Americans is explained in the context of the story, it is "a shaky rationale meant to echo the rhetoric" surrounding the genocide and forced relocation. Elston recognized the Native American character Nastas as an example of Gerald Vizenor's "manifest manners", a falsification of the indigenous experience being told as truth. Dr. Esther Wright proposed Native American characters were included only to justify and complement the white characters' otherness as oppositional to the government and civilization, describing it as "a disingenuous oversimplification and (mis)use of the complexities of Native American genocide". She opined that, while John is not overtly racist, his participation in an attack on an Indian reservation implicates him in "a micro-scale recreation of racist, genocidal violence". Margini considered the representation could either be an example of dark satire or "a crafty way of excusing their genocide at Marston's hand", aligned with a wider erasure seen in other Western media. Triana found Native Americans "end up victims to the game's evil social forces" due to John's priority of reuniting with his family.

== Development ==
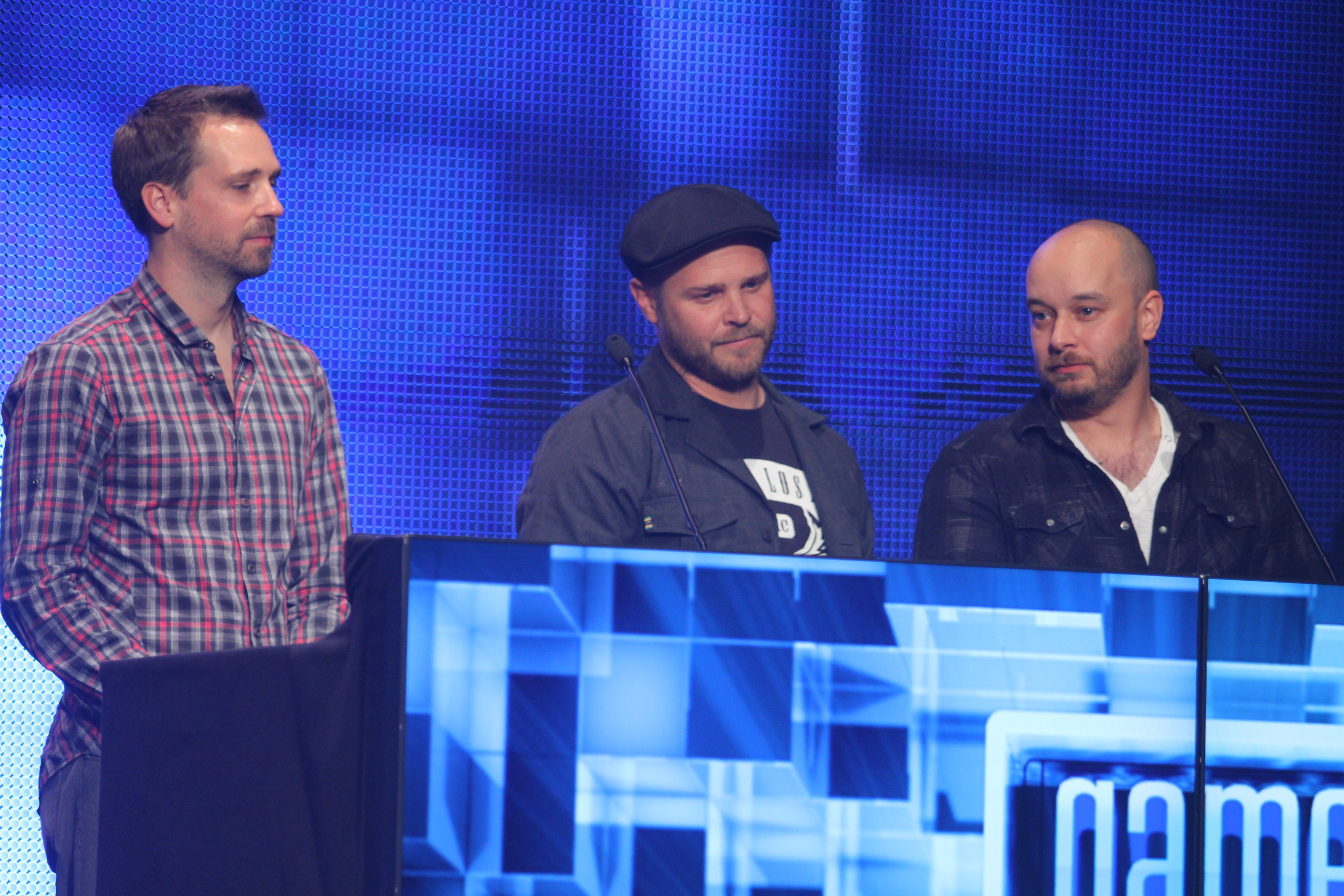
Part of Red Dead Redemption's leadership team: (left to right) technical director Ted Carson, art director Josh Bass, and producer Steve Martin at the Game Developers Choice Awards

Rockstar Games acquired Red Dead Revolver from Capcom in 2003 after years of development and published the game within nine months; after its May 2004 release, Rockstar wanted to create its own Western video game from scratch. Early development began in 2005, and full development commenced in 2006, following the formation of a core development team. Rockstar San Diego's 180-person team co-opted Rockstar's Leeds, New England, North, and Toronto studios to facilitate development between a full team of over 1,000. Having exhausted the use of previous hardware on other projects, Rockstar felt inspired after realizing the potential power of the PlayStation 3 and Xbox 360. Analyst estimations place the combined development and marketing budget between US$80 million and US$100 million, which would make it one of the most expensive video games to develop. Development received controversy following accusations of unethical working practices at Rockstar San Diego, including twelve-hour workdays and six-day weeks, with a lower-than-the-industry-average salary increase.

Red Dead Redemption's 1,500-page script was written in two years. Taking inspiration from films like The Wild Bunch (1969), High Plains Drifter (1973), Unforgiven (1992), and The Proposition (2005), the team felt most Western fiction takes place between 1840 and 1880, with Red Dead Redemption's 1911 setting allowing a more intriguing analysis of the transformation from "the old West" into the modern world. The team wanted the depiction of violence to "feel slightly raw and unpleasant", attempting realism without exaggeration. The open world was created to represent iconic features of the American frontier. The team organized field trips to Washington, D.C., visiting the Library of Congress and the National Archives Building, captured a multitude of photographs, and analyzed various classic Western films, television shows, and novels. They considered the open world's creation one of the most technically demanding aspect of production, in terms of filling the world with enough content to interest the player.

Like other projects since Rockstar Games Presents Table Tennis (2006), the game uses the proprietary Rockstar Advanced Game Engine (RAGE) to perform animation and rendering tasks, and the Euphoria and Bullet engines for further animation and environment rendering tasks. Overhauling the potential processing power of RAGE allowed the game to create a high level of detail, including realistic animations and detailed textures. The potential power of the PlayStation 3 and Xbox 360 experienced through the development kits motivated the team to begin development, and to create a game that could fully render the countryside, which was difficult to achieve on previous hardware. The developers at San Diego sought guidance from other Rockstar studios experienced with developing open worlds, particularly Grand Theft Auto developer Rockstar North. The game was envisioned to improve the core mechanics of Red Dead Revolver by scaling it up to the standard of other Rockstar games, maintaining key gameplay elements like the Dead Eye and dueling mechanics but majorly overhauling the experience otherwise. In particular, the team faced a challenge in creating realistic movement for the horse, resulting in the engagement of a stunt horse to simulate movement for the designers.

As the story developed, a range of characters were organically created based on the period; Red Dead Redemption features around 450 characters. It required a large amount of character dialogue in order to feel alive, comparable to Rockstar's previous game, Grand Theft Auto IV. Researchers at Rockstar developed a style guide based on real sayings of the time period. Rockstar hired Rod Edge as the full-time director to handle actors' performances, recorded using motion capture technology in Santa Monica, California, with additional dialogue and sound effects recorded in a studio. After an audition process, Rob Wiethoff was selected to portray John Marston. John was developed to be a "family man" with nuance, as opposed to an explicit villain or hero. Steve J. Palmer, who portrayed Bill Williamson, felt that John and Bill represented siblings in their former gang, while Dutch van der Linde was more of a parental figure. Benjamin Byron Davis, who portrayed Dutch, was told that Dutch was a well-read, charismatic former gang leader who had "lost his mind".

Red Dead Redemption is one of Rockstar's first games to use an original score. Music supervisor Ivan Pavlovich cited the large scale of the game as one of the largest difficulties when producing the score; to achieve an effective gaming experience, the game could not solely feature licensed music, like previous Rockstar games. In 2008, Rockstar engaged musicians Bill Elm and Woody Jackson, who collaborated to compose approximately 200 tracks for the game over 15 months. The original score and subsequent album were both recorded and mixed at Jackson's studio, Electro-Vox Recording Studios in Los Angeles, and mastered at Capitol Studios. When researching music for inspiration, Jackson found that there was no "Western sound" in 1911; he felt that the soundtracks of 1960s Western films, such as Ennio Morricone's work on the Dollars Trilogy, was more representative of Western music. Rockstar also consulted musicians who played traditional Western instruments, such as harmonica player Tommy Morgan. The game also features vocal performances by Ashtar Command, José González, Jamie Lidell, and William Elliott Whitmore.

== Release and promotion ==
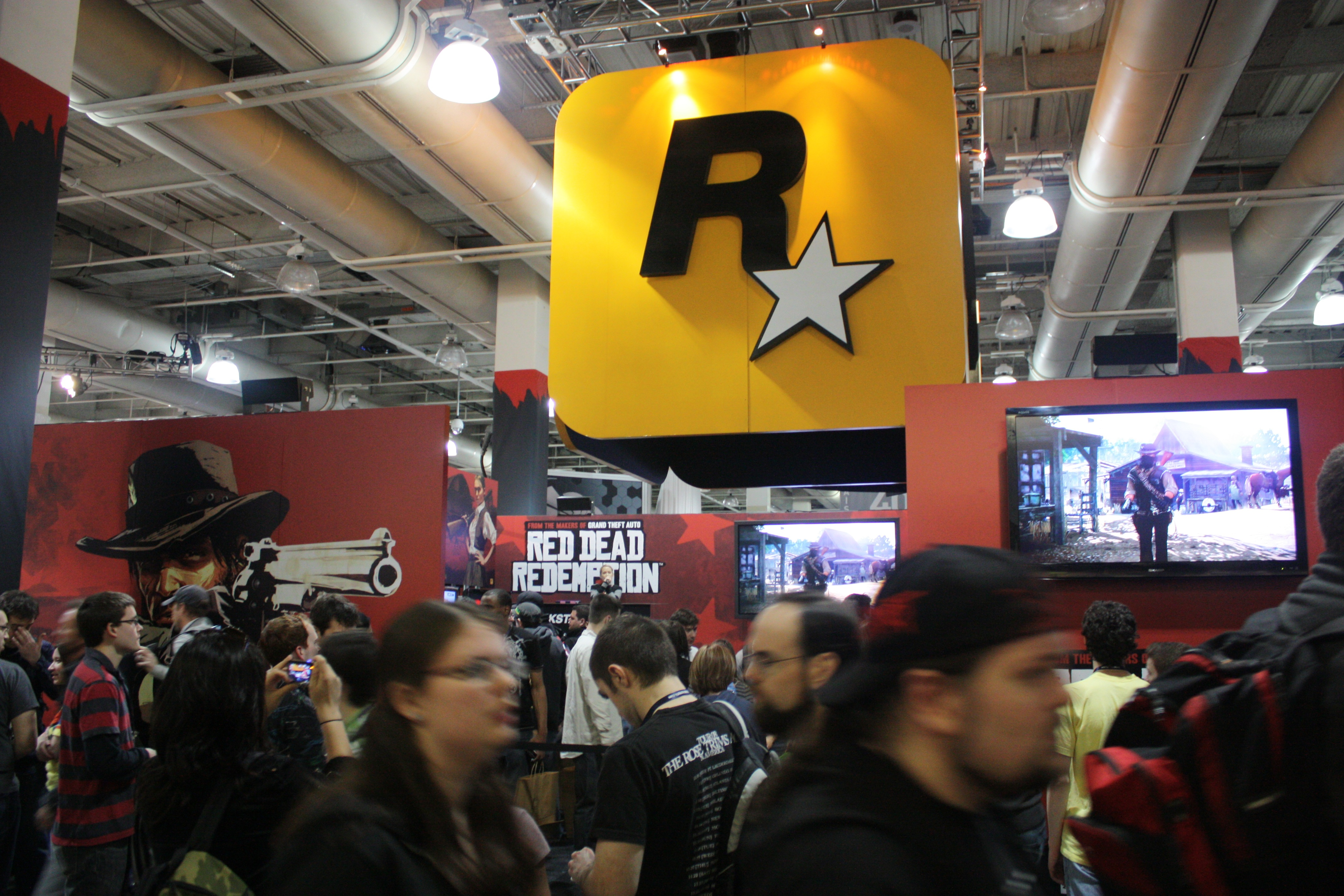
Red Dead Redemption was marketed extensively, including an exhibition at PAX East in March 2010.

Rockstar showcased an early trailer for an untitled Western project at Sony's E3 conference in May 2005; it was a RAGE technology demonstration for the PlayStation 3, theorized to be a sequel to Red Dead Revolver. Rockstar announced Red Dead Redemption on February 3, 2009. The debut trailer was released on May 6, introducing the protagonist. The game received an extensive and expensive marketing campaign, during which Rockstar partnered with several companies and media outlets, including IGN, GameSpot, LoveFilm, Microsoft, and YouTube. To encourage pre-order sales, Rockstar collaborated with retail outlets to provide pre-order bonuses, including exclusive in-game items, as well as a special edition with unique packaging and a copy of the soundtrack. The game was exhibited at PAX East in late March 2010, with a 15–30 minute playable demonstration. Rockstar released a Facebook application, Red Dead Redemption: Gunslingers, in April 2010. The following month, Red Dead Redemption: The Man from Blackwater, a machinima short film directed by John Hillcoat, aired in the United States on the television network Fox. The game missed its original projected late 2009 and April 2010 release dates, pushed back to May 18, 2010, in North America, and May 21 internationally, citing the "optimal time frame".

Downloadable content (DLC) for the game was released following its launch, with focus on maps and game types suggested by the community. Outlaws to the End, released on June 22, 2010, added six cooperative multiplayer side missions. Legends and Killers was released on August 10, and added multiplayer characters from Red Dead Revolver, as well as new map locations and a Tomahawk weapon. On September 21, Liars and Cheats added competitive multiplayer modes, minigames, characters, and a weapon. Hunting and Trading, released on October 12, added a jackalope to the world, and some additional outfits. Undead Nightmare adds a single-player campaign, set in a non-canonical, zombie apocalypse–themed alternate reality with ghost towns and cemeteries full of zombies, wherein John searches for a cure to the zombie outbreak. It was released on October 26, as DLC and in late November as a standalone expansion pack. Myths and Mavericks released for free on September 13, 2011, adding additional characters and locations to the multiplayer. A Game of the Year Edition containing all downloadable content was released for both PlayStation 3 and Xbox 360 on October 11 in North America and on October 14 internationally.

Microsoft added Red Dead Redemption and Undead Nightmare to its backward compatibility list for Xbox One, the successor to the Xbox 360, in July 2016; Red Dead Redemption had been one of the most requested titles for the feature. Its sales position on Amazon.com spiked following the announcement. The release runs at a smoother frame rate on the Xbox One. In April 2018, the game received an update as an "Xbox One X enhanced" title, making it playable at 4K resolution (an increase from the original 720p resolution) with graphical improvements on the high-end revision of Xbox One, called Xbox One X. The Xbox Series X and Series S can also play the game, with the higher-end Series X running it with its Xbox One X-specific enhancements. Sony added Red Dead Redemption and Undead Nightmare to its cloud gaming subscription service, PlayStation Now, in December 2016, which allowed them to be played on PlayStation 4, PlayStation 5, and Windows; they were removed in October 2022.

According to industry sources, Rockstar shelved a Red Dead Redemption remaster after the poor reception of Grand Theft Auto: The Trilogy – The Definitive Edition (2021), instead increasing focus on development for Grand Theft Auto VI. Media speculation restarted in June 2023, and in August, Rockstar announced the single-player modes of Red Dead Redemption and Undead Nightmare would release for the Nintendo Switch and PlayStation 4 on August 17, developed by Double Eleven. Physical versions were released on October 13. Reactions to the announcement were mixed; some appreciated the availability on modern consoles, but lamented the lack of visual and frame rate upgrades, absence of a Windows version, omission of multiplayer, and US$49.99 price point. The game is playable at 4K resolution on the PlayStation 4 Pro and PlayStation 5 via backward compatibility, and an update in October added an option to increase the frame rate from 30 to 60 frames-per-second on PlayStation 5. Speculation regarding a Windows version started in May 2024, and in October, Rockstar announced the Windows version would release on October 29, with enhancements such as native 4K support, ultrawide monitor compatibility, and DLSS upscaling.

Following premature store and ESRB listings on November 13, 2025, Rockstar announced that Red Dead Redemption would be released for Android and iOS mobile devices on December 2, alongside new releases for the Nintendo Switch 2, PlayStation 5, and Xbox Series X/S. The mobile versions were available through a Netflix Games subscription for a year, and the console versions through the GTA+ Games Library and the PlayStation Plus Catalog. Developed in collaboration with Double Eleven and Cast Iron Games, the console versions support 60 frames-per-second, including up to 4K resolution on PlayStation 5 and Xbox Series X/S, and the Switch 2 version utilizes the Joy-Con 2's optical mouse controls. Owners of the Switch, PlayStation 4, and Xbox One versions can upgrade digitally for free. A physical PlayStation 5 version was released on May 4, 2026.

== Reception ==
=== Critical response ===
PlayStation 3 and Xbox 360 reception

Aggregate score
Aggregator	Score
Metacritic	95/100

Review scores
Publication	Score
1Up.com	A
Edge	10/10 (Note: Edge originally gave the game 9/10, but retroactively changed the score to 10/10.)
Eurogamer	8/10
Game Informer	9.75/10
GamePro	5/5
GameSpot	9.5/10
GameSpy	5/5
IGN	9.7/10

Red Dead Redemption received "universal acclaim" from critics, according to review aggregator Metacritic. It is among the highest-rated games on Metacritic, and is ranked the sixth-highest rated PlayStation 3 and seventh-highest rated Xbox 360 game. IGN's Brudvig described Red Dead Redemption as "a must-play" and "one of the deepest, most fun, and most gorgeous games around"; GamePro's Will Herring named it Rockstar's best game to date, a culmination of its previous successes. Eurogamer's Simon Parkin called it "a blockbuster video game: a string of cinematic set-pieces and flawed yet endearing characters nestled within an orthodox narrative structure, seasoned with generous pinches of extra-curricular tasks".

GameSpy's Will Tuttle found the themes more nuanced than expected, though occasionally "preachy". Mike Channell of Official Xbox Magazine (OXM) considered the death of the Wild West a pressure that loomed over the narrative. Game Informer's Matt Bertz felt the narrative momentum suffered from the length of the Mexico missions but praised the ending for using a "sense of immersiveness only a video game can impart"; IGN's Brudvig similarly lauded the climax as one of gaming's best. GamePro's Herring was surprised by John's likability—"one of the more sympathetic antiheroes in recent memory"—and found the secondary characters "interesting enough that they never feel contrived"; conversely, Paste's Kirk Hamilton opined the latter, "clichéd and unlikeable", undermined the narrative. GameSpot's Justin Calvert applauded the "deeply flawed but very likable" John, noting his scars and outfit made him feel more believable. IGN's Brudvig found John's motivations occasionally confusing and felt alienated from the narrative.

The song "Far Away" by José González plays as John enters Mexico in a scene described by critics as "perfect" and "beautiful".

Game Informer's Bertz named Red Dead Redemption the "best-looking Rockstar game to date". IGN's Brudvig lauded the environmental details and richness of dynamic events and weather. GamePro's Herring considered the open world superior to its contemporaries, appreciating the change from Grand Theft Auto IV's "brown, muddy 'realism' filter". GameSpy's Tuttle named the game's environment its most impressive element, praising the ecology and geography, and Eurogamer's Parkin considered the world as dense as Grand Theft Auto IV's Liberty City while maintaining the Western theme of isolation. Edge found the world emptier than Liberty City but felt "Rockstar proves far better at guiding your eye to the relevant parts". Side missions received praise; 1Up.com's Scott Sharkey described them as "perfect little micro-dramas". Edge felt the side content's variety avoided the repetition of Assassin's Creed.

Game Informer's Bertz found Red Dead Redemption "tranpose[d] the Grand Theft Auto gameplay template onto a Wild West setting". Good Game's Stephanie Bendixsen felt the game used Grand Theft Auto IV's best elements. GameSpot's Calvert lauded the bounty system for adding consequence to the player's actions. Critics praised the horseback controls; GamePro's Herring found them authentic. Eurogamer's Parkin named the player's relationship with their horse among the greatest successes, but noted some awkward controls, particularly when running. Edge felt the Dead Eye mechanic "puts gunplay on a pedestal", and IGN's Brudvig wrote it "makes you feel like a classic gunslinger". Eurogamer's Parkin compared the combat favorably to Rockstar's previous titles, particularly praising the horseback shootouts, but criticized the "sticky and outdated" cover mechanic. Game Informer's Bertz found the aiming and cover system as "airtight" as Grand Theft Auto IV's, and lauded the unique weapons and animations, and OXM's Channell commended the weapon variety and handling. G4's Jake Gaskill opined the Dead Eye "can feel a bit too powerful at times".

GameSpy's Tuttle found the minimalist score added to the world's authenticity, and Eurogamer's Parkin named it "standout", praising the use of multiple instruments. GamePro's Herring favorably compared it to Ennio Morricone's work on the Dollars Trilogy. PSM3's Andy Hartup thought the music complemented the action and scenery, never feeling intrusive, and Paste's Hamilton found it was integrated into the world seamlessly. GameStop's Calvert described the soundtrack as "superb" though noted it "occasionally swells up without reason". The vocal tracks received praise; the scene wherein John enters Mexico was described as "beautiful" by GamesRadar's Matt Cundy due to the use of José González's "Far Away".

Game Informer's Bertz described the multiplayer as "a fully featured complement" to the single-player. GamePro's Herring praised the variety of modes and open gameplay but noted it put more responsibility on the players to keep the game interesting. GameSpot's Calvert felt there was a lack in customization options for players, and 1Up.com's Sharkey criticized the leveling mechanics. G4's Jake Gaskill echoed this sentiment and noted players are often respawned in close proximity to the opposition.

Re-release reception

Aggregate scores
Aggregator	Score
Metacritic	NS & Win: 83/100; NS2: 88/100; PS4: 78/100
OpenCritic	73% recommend

Review scores
Publication	Score
4Players	7/10
HobbyConsolas	88/100
Push Square	6/10
TouchArcade	4.5/5

Red Dead Redemption and Undead Nightmare's re-release received "generally favorable reviews" according to Metacritic, and 73% of critics recommended the game according to OpenCritic. Reviewers criticized the price due to lack of enhancements and omission of multiplayer; Nintendo Life's PJ O'Reilly called the release "bare-bones". Critics appreciated the PlayStation's enhanced resolution, shadows, and anti-aliasing, but felt improvements were otherwise sparse; Eurogamer's Oliver Mackenzie criticized the outdated user interface. Several reviewers praised the Switch version's portability and performance and considered it an improvement over Grand Theft Auto: The Trilogy – The Definitive Edition ; GamesRadar+'s Joe Donnelly favorably compared it to Grand Theft Auto: Liberty City Stories (2005) for putting an impressive open world on a handheld console. The Windows version's optimization and customization options received praise, though some found the visual enhancements limited, and HobbyConsolas's Alberto Lloret criticized the required use of the Rockstar Games Launcher and Social Club.

=== Accolades ===
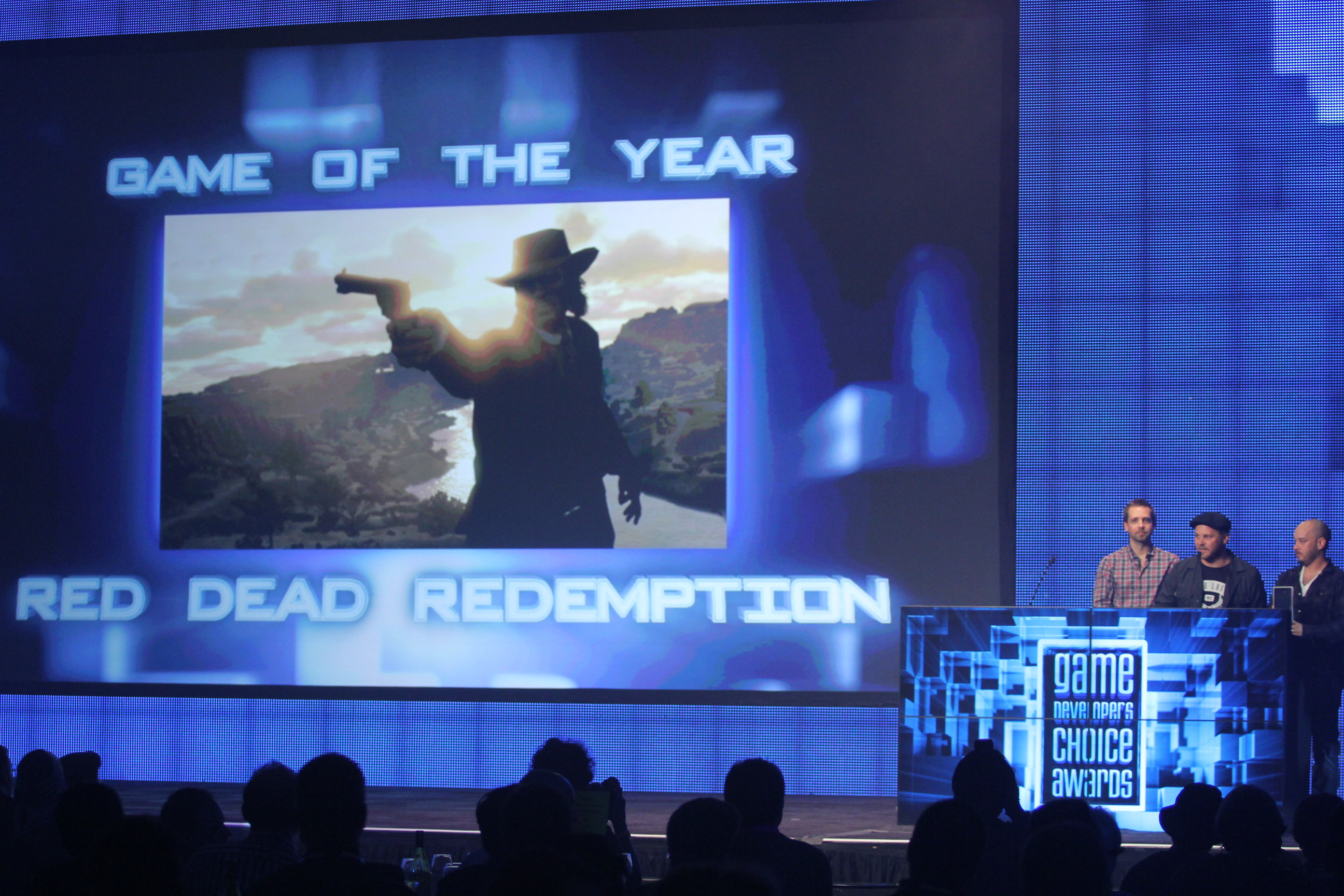
Red Dead Redemption won the Game Developers Choice Award for Game of the Year.

Red Dead Redemption received multiple nomination and awards from gaming publications. At the Spike Video Game Awards in 2010, the game received ten nominations and went on to win four awards: Game of the Year, Best Song in a Game ("Far Away"), Best Original Score, and Best DLC (Undead Nightmare). The game led the 14th Annual Interactive Achievement Awards with nine nominations and five awards, winning Action Game of the Year, Outstanding Achievement in Game Direction, and Outstanding Character Performance for Wiethoff's portrayal of John Marston. At the 11th Annual Game Developers Choice Awards, Red Dead Redemption won four awards of five nominations, including Game of the Year and Best Game Design.

It received ten nominations at the 9th Annual Game Audio Network Guild Awards, of which it won four: Audio of the Year, Music of the Year, Best Interactive Score, and Best Dialogue. The game was not nominated for any of the jury-based awards at the British Academy Games Awards as Rockstar did not submit it for consideration. It appeared on several year-end lists of the best games of 2010, receiving Game of the Year wins from outlets such as 1Up.com, Computer and Video Games, Digital Spy, Gamasutra, Game Informer, GameSpot, GameSpy, GamesRadar, Good Game, The Guardian, Kotaku, and VentureBeat.

Award	Date	Category	Recipient(s) and nominee(s)	Result	Ref.
British Academy Games Awards	March 16, 2011	GAME Award of 2010	Red Dead Redemption	Nominated	
Game Audio Network Guild Awards	March 3, 2011	Audio of the Year	Red Dead Redemption	Won	
Game Audio Network Guild Awards	March 3, 2011	Music of the Year	Red Dead Redemption	Won	
Game Audio Network Guild Awards	March 3, 2011	Best Interactive Score	Red Dead Redemption	Won	
Game Audio Network Guild Awards	March 3, 2011	Best Dialogue	Red Dead Redemption	Won	
Game Audio Network Guild Awards	March 3, 2011	Sound Design of the Year	Red Dead Redemption	Nominated	
Game Audio Network Guild Awards	March 3, 2011	Best Soundtrack Album	Red Dead Redemption	Nominated	
Game Audio Network Guild Awards	March 3, 2011	Best Cinematic/Cut-Scene Audio	Red Dead Redemption	Nominated	
Game Audio Network Guild Awards	March 3, 2011	Best Original Instrumental	"Main Theme"	Nominated	
Game Audio Network Guild Awards	March 3, 2011	Best Original Vocal – Pop	"Dead Man's Gun"	Nominated	
Game Audio Network Guild Awards	March 3, 2011	Best Original Vocal – Pop	"Far Away"	Nominated	
Game Developers Choice Awards	March 3, 2011	Game of the Year	Red Dead Redemption	Won	
Game Developers Choice Awards	March 3, 2011	Best Game Design	Red Dead Redemption	Won	
Game Developers Choice Awards	March 3, 2011	Best Technology	Red Dead Redemption	Won	
Game Developers Choice Awards	March 3, 2011	Best Audio	Red Dead Redemption	Won	
Game Developers Choice Awards	March 3, 2011	Best Writing	Red Dead Redemption	Nominated	
Golden Joystick Awards	October 29, 2010	Ultimate Game of the Year	Red Dead Redemption	Nominated	
Golden Joystick Awards	October 29, 2010	Action/Adventure Game of the Year	Red Dead Redemption	Third	
Interactive Achievement Awards	February 11, 2011	Action Game of the Year	Red Dead Redemption	Won	
Interactive Achievement Awards	February 11, 2011	Outstanding Achievement in Art Direction	Red Dead Redemption	Won	
Interactive Achievement Awards	February 11, 2011	Outstanding Achievement in Gameplay Engineering	Red Dead Redemption	Won	
Interactive Achievement Awards	February 11, 2011	Outstanding Achievement in Game Direction	Red Dead Redemption	Won	
Interactive Achievement Awards	February 11, 2011	Outstanding Character Performance	Rob Wiethoff as John Marston	Won	
Interactive Achievement Awards	February 11, 2011	Game of the Year	Red Dead Redemption	Nominated	
Interactive Achievement Awards	February 11, 2011	Outstanding Innovation in Gaming	Red Dead Redemption	Nominated	
Interactive Achievement Awards	February 11, 2011	Outstanding Achievement in Animation	Red Dead Redemption	Nominated	
Interactive Achievement Awards	February 11, 2011	Outstanding Achievement in Sound Design	Red Dead Redemption	Nominated	
Spike Video Game Awards	December 11, 2010	Game of the Year	Red Dead Redemption	Won	
Spike Video Game Awards	December 11, 2010	Best Song in a Game	"Far Away" by José González	Won	
Spike Video Game Awards	December 11, 2010	Best Original Score	Red Dead Redemption	Won	
Spike Video Game Awards	December 11, 2010	Best DLC	Undead Nightmare	Won	
Spike Video Game Awards	December 11, 2010	Studio of the Year	Rockstar San Diego	Nominated	
Spike Video Game Awards	December 11, 2010	Character of the Year	John Marston	Nominated	
Spike Video Game Awards	December 11, 2010	Best PS3 Game	Red Dead Redemption	Nominated	
Spike Video Game Awards	December 11, 2010	Best Action Adventure Game	Red Dead Redemption	Nominated	
Spike Video Game Awards	December 11, 2010	Best Graphics	Red Dead Redemption	Nominated	
Spike Video Game Awards	December 11, 2010	Best Performance by a Human Male	Rob Wiethoff as John Marston	Nominated	
Spike Video Game Awards	December 7, 2012	Game of the Decade	Red Dead Redemption	Nominated	
The Steam Awards	December 31, 2024	Best Soundtrack	Red Dead Redemption	Won	

== Sales ==
Prior to Red Dead Redemption's release, Michael Pachter of Wedbush Securities estimated it would need to sell at least 1.75 million units (generating US$80 million) to break-even, and 3.5 million units ($160 million) to earn a profit. According to Joystiq, a source at Rockstar claimed the game required four million sales to recoup development costs but the publisher expected to lose money and was more interested in proving Rockstar San Diego's talent.

Red Dead Redemption was the best-selling game of May 2010, selling over 1.5 million copies, according to the NPD Group. It sold over five million copies in its first three weeks. In June 2010, Ben Feder, the chief executive officer of Rockstar's parent company Take-Two Interactive, said the game was nearing profitability for the company. By September 2010, the game had shipped 6.9 million copies, exceeding Take-Two's performance expectations for the quarter. It was the fifth best-selling game of 2010; the Xbox 360 version was the ninth best-selling individual platform game. The game sold 8 million copies by February 2011, contributing to a 7.7 percent quarterly profit increase for Take-Two. It shipped 8.5 million copies in its first year, and over 11 million copies by August 2011, of which two million were retail units of Undead Nightmare. Red Dead Redemption shipped over 15 million units by February 2017, around 23 million by September 2021, and 25 million by December 2024.

The game topped the charts in the United Kingdom, maintaining the top position until the release of Lego Harry Potter: Years 1–4 in June 2010. According to GfK Chart-Track, 65 percent of UK sales in the first week were on Xbox 360. The game was the fourth best-selling game in the United Kingdom in 2010, as well as the fourth best-selling PlayStation 3 and Xbox 360 title. It sold over 95,000 units in its first week in Japan; the PlayStation 3 version was the fourth best-selling game of the week with over 70,000 sales, while the Xbox 360 version was seventh with over 25,000.

== Legacy ==
Critics concurred that Red Dead Redemption was among the best games of the seventh generation of video game consoles. Eurogamer's Dan Whitehead hoped the eighth generation of consoles would offer "similarly powerful experiences". In September 2013, IGN ranked Red Dead Redemption the fifth-best PlayStation 3 and seventh-best Xbox 360 game. In 2015, GamesRadar ranked it sixth on its list of best games, recognizing its superiority in narrative over Rockstar's Grand Theft Auto V (2013), and USgamer ranked it tenth on its list of best 21st-century games; Jaz Rignall called it "one of the finest open world games so far seen". GamesRadar+ named it the fourth-best game of the decade in 2019, comparing it favorably to other sandbox games Grand Theft Auto V and The Witcher 3: Wild Hunt (2015). Red Dead Redemption ranked high on several best game lists determined by the public; it featured seventh on Good Game's "Top 100 Games" list, and fifth on IGN's "Games of a Generation" list, as voted by the program and website's respective audiences.

A prequel, Red Dead Redemption 2, was released in October 2018 for PlayStation 4 and Xbox One. The game's main story is set in 1899, 12 years before Red Dead Redemption, and depicts John's life as part of Dutch's gang alongside Bill, Javier, Uncle, Abigail, and Jack. The player controls fellow gang member Arthur Morgan.

== Bibliography ==
- Bartel, Christopher (2012). "Resolving the gamer's dilemma". Ethics and Information Technology. 14. Springer Science+Business Media: 11–16. doi:10.1007/s10676-011-9280-8. S2CID 14979697.
- Bogenn, Tim; Barba, Rick (May 14, 2010). Red Dead Redemption Signature Series Strategy Guide. BradyGames. ISBN 978-0-744-01030-5.
- Byrd, Jodi (2014). "Red Dead Conventions: American Indian Transgeneric Fictions". In Cox, James H.; Justice, Daniel Heath (eds.). The Oxford Handbook of Indigenous American Literature. Oxford University Press. pp. 344–357. doi:10.1093/oxfordhb/9780199914036.013.033. ISBN 978-0-199-98384-1.
- Elston, M. Melissa (2013). "Allegorical Confrontation Meets Gaming System: Rhetoric and Trauma within Red Dead Redemption / Undead Nightmare". In Miller, Cynthia J.; Van Riper, A. Bowdoin (eds.). Undead in the West II: They Just Keep Coming. Scarecrow Press. pp. 142–158. ISBN 978-0-81089-265-1.
- Humphreys, Sara (2012). "Rejuvenating 'Eternal Inequality' on the Digital Frontiers". Western American Literature. 47 (2). University of Nebraska Press: 200–215. doi:10.1353/wal.2012.0048. S2CID 162084363.
- Margini, Matt (2020). Red Dead Redemption. Boss Fight Books. ISBN 978-1-94053-524-1.
- Pallant, Chris (2013). "'Now I Know I'm a Lowlife': Controlling Play in GTA: IV, Red Dead Redemption, and LA Noire". In Wysocki, Matthew (ed.). Ctrl-Alt-Play: Essays on Control in Video Gaming. McFarland. pp. 133–145. ISBN 978-0-78647-013-6.
- Red Dead Redemption (PDF) (manual). United States of America: Rockstar Games. May 18, 2010. Archived (PDF) from the original on December 12, 2019.
- Robinson, Nick (2017). "John Marston". In Banks, Jaime; Mejia, Robert; Adams, Aubrie (eds.). 100 Greatest Video Game Characters. Lanham, Maryland: Rowman & Littlefield. pp. 89–90. ISBN 978-1-4422-7813-4.
- Spring, Dawn (2015). "Gaming history: computer and video games as historical scholarship". Rethinking History: The Journal of Theory and Practice. 19 (2). Taylor & Francis: 207–221. doi:10.1080/13642529.2014.973714. S2CID 144613217.
- Triana, Benjamin J. (2015). "Red Dead Masculinity: Constructing a Conceptual Framework for Analyzing the Narrative and Message Found in Video Games". Journal of Games Criticism. 2 (2). Rensselaer Polytechnic Institute. Archived from the original on October 12, 2015.
- Tuominen, Juho; Sotamaa, Olli (August 11, 2021). "'Outlaws to the End' – A Study of the Social and Political Reality of Rockstar Games' West". WiderScreen Ajankohtaista. 24. WiderScreen. ISSN 1795-6161. urn:nbn:fi:tuni-202108316893.
- Welsh, Timothy J. (2016). "The Rock of the Virtual: Violence in Blood Meridian and Red Dead Redemption". Mixed Realism: Videogames and the Violence of Fiction. University of Minnesota Press. pp. 159–171. ISBN 978-1-45295-201-7. JSTOR 10.5749/j.ctt1j68mcs.12.
- Whitaker, Robert (2023). "The Last Enemy That Shall Be Considered: Law and Order in Red Dead". In Wills, John; Wright, Esther (eds.). Red Dead Redemption: History, Myth, and Violence in the Video Game West. University of Oklahoma Press. pp. 59–75. ISBN 978-0-8061-9192-8.
- Westerside, Andrew; Holopainen, Jussi (2019). Sites of Play: Locating Gameplace in Red Dead Redemption 2 (PDF). DiGRA International Conference: 'Game, Play and the Emerging Ludo-Mix'. Digital Games Research Association. Archived (PDF) from the original on July 20, 2020.
- Wright, Esther (2021). "Rockstar Games, Red Dead Redemption, and Narratives of 'Progress'". European Journal of American Studies. 16 (3). European Association for American Studies. doi:10.4000/ejas.17300. S2CID 240579391.
