= Association for the Study of American Indian Literatures =

Organization of American Indian studies

- Founded: 1971
- Type: Academic
- Purpose: Native American studies
- Region served: United States and Canada
- Product: Studies in American Indian Literatures
- Key people: Molly McGlennen (President)
- Website: asail.org

The Association for the Study of American Indian Literatures (ASAIL) is a professional academic organization. It was founded in 1971 to promote the study, criticism, and research of American Indian literary traditions, both written and oral. Its journal, Studies in American Indian Literatures, has been the primary journal for the study of North American indigenous literature for over thirty years.

== Conferences ==
ASAIL is affiliated with the Modern Language Association (MLA). ASAIL sponsors panels at several conferences:

- The Native American Literature Symposium,
- The American Literature Association (ALA) conference,
- The Society for the Study of American Women Writers (SSAWW) conference.

== Publications ==
ASAIL publishes the quarterly journal Studies in American Indian Literatures. It has been the primary journal for the study of North American indigenous literature for over thirty years.
