= Ashtar Command (band) =

American indie rock band

- Genres: Indie rock, Psychedelic rock, Alternative rock, Chillout
- Members: Chris Holmes; Brian Liesegang
- Website: ashtar-command.com

Ashtar Command is the name of an indie rock band composed of Chris Holmes (not to be confused with the former guitar player for the metal band W.A.S.P.) and Brian Liesegang. They have released one album: "Love Songs In Advance of the Landing", one EP: "Holding Out For Love", and have had songs featured in a number of feature films, television series, television commercials, and video games such as one of the first Microsoft Zune commercials, on the FIFA 13 soundtrack list, two Nissan Altima commercials, on The Avengers (1998) Soundtrack, on Spread, on Fragments, on The O.C. television series, and on Rockstar Games' Red Dead Redemption Original Soundtrack and in the video game end credits sequence.

== History ==
After hearing Chris Holmes DJ in South America, Paul McCartney requested that Holmes do something before McCartney's own Friday set at the Coachella Festival in 2009. Holmes created a mix of old Beatles' covers with McCartney's Temporary Secretary. Holmes displayed his band's "Ashtar Command" logo on both sides of the Coachella Festival stage prior to his opening act for McCartney as foreshadowing for an Ashtar Command resurgence. On May 12, 2011, Chris Holmes was on tour with Paul McCartney in South America.

== Discography ==
- Love Songs In Advance of the Landing (2008)
- Holding Out For Love (2010)
- American Sunshine (2011)

== Song appearances ==
- "(Walking On) Landmines" from Ten Inch Hero (1997)
- "Solve My Problems Today" from The Avengers film soundtrack (1998)
- "Summer's End featuring Sinéad O'Connor" from The Avengers film soundtrack (1998)
- "Into Dust" from Music from the OC: Mix 6 (2006)
- "Holding Out For Love" from Grey's Anatomy (Season 6, episode 18)
- "Deadman's Gun" from Rockstar Games' Red Dead Redemption Original Soundtrack (2010)
- "Mark IV featuring Joshua Radin" from EA Sports' FIFA 13 Soundtrack (2012)
- "Four Years Gone" from How to Make Money Selling Drugs (2012)

== See also ==
- Chris Holmes
- Brian Liesegang
