= Chris Holmes (DJ) =

American DJ and musician

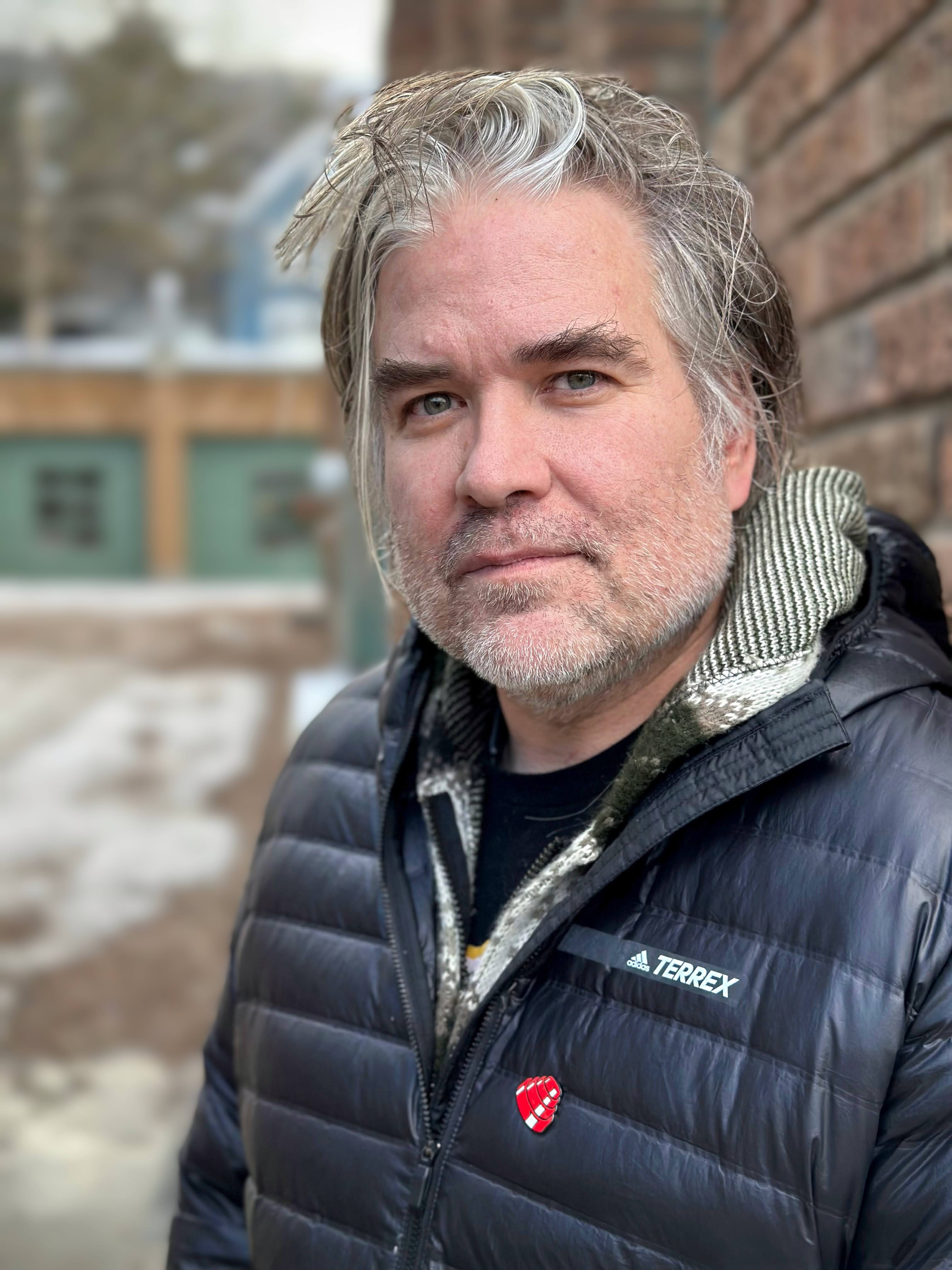
- Holmes at the 2024 Sundance Film Festival

Background information
- Genres: Orchestral pop; Indie rock; Psychedelic rock; Alternative rock; Chillout
- Occupations: DJ; musician; record producer; engineer; film producer
- Instruments: guitar; bass; keyboards; tambora; theremin; drum programming
- Years active: 1992-present
- Labels: Atlantic Records; TAG Recordings; Privateer
- Formerly of: Yum-Yum; Ashtar Command

Chris Holmes is a DJ and musician. He is best known as Paul McCartney's DJ, warming up audiences since 2009, but his contributions are much broader. He has collaborated with The Smashing Pumpkins, Felix da Housecat, Daft Punk, Rachael Yamagata, Soulwax, LCD Soundsystem, Prince, Bloc Party, Mandy Moore, Interpol, Bauhaus, Justice, Joshua Radin, Spank Rock, Fischerspooner, Yeah Yeah Yeahs, Hanson, Peaches, Sean "Diddy" Combs, The Chemical Brothers, MSTRKRFT, Beck, Hot Chip, and Mark Ronson.

== Early career ==
Holmes was born in Washington, D.C. in 1972 to Richard and Marilyn Grubaugh Holmes. He was the youngest of their three children, all boys. He moved to Mississauga, Ontario when he was 6 years old and then to Lake Bluff, Illinois, a Chicago suburb, in 1983. Chris graduated from Lake Forest, Illinois high school and graduated with honors from the University of Chicago. Liz Phair credits Holmes with coining the term "Guyville" from her smash 1993 album Exile in Guyville. "Guyville" was also in the title of a song by Chicago band Urge Overkill.

In the 1990s, Holmes hosted a show, “In Advance of the Landing,” on the University of Chicago's WHPK, during which he explored extraterrestrial phenomena and cults. He extensively interviewed members of the Heaven's Gate millennial cult before they committed suicide in 1997.

In 1995, Holmes' band, Sabalon Glitz, was noticed by British music critic Simon Reynolds. They appeared at Lollapalooza in 1995 and their album Ufonic generated critical interest. They caught the ear of Atlantic Records Vice President John Rubeli. In 1995 Holmes signed to Atlantic Records without the rest of the band.

He formed another group, Yum-Yum, attempting to create a caricature of pop schlock. The band's debut album, Dan Loves Patti, was released in May 1996. The album was picked up by alternative radio stations across the country, getting spins with tracks "Apiary" and "Doot Doot". Both Rolling Stone and Spin ran stories about Holmes and the band. Holmes was featured in a Billboard article about the ork-pop/chamber pop trend.

In 1996, Yum-Yum began touring midwestern college towns, often appearing in bunny suits. On September 27, 1996, word broke that Atlantic's TAG Recordings imprint, on which the record was released, had been discontinued. The lack of label marketing led to small audiences. The Yum-Yum record sold a little over 8,000 copies. The album was re-released in 2018 on Omnivore Records with 10 bonus tracks, including covers of Prince, The Ronettes, and The Muppets' “Rainbow Connection.”

== Mid-career ==
After Yum-Yum, Holmes stopped releasing music for many years, but took on other endeavors:

- In 2000, played keyboards for The Smashing Pumpkins while touring in Europe.
- In 2003, co-wrote a song on Rachael Yamagata's debut self-titled EP.
- In 2004, contributed drum programming and lyrics to a song on Felix da Housecat's Devin Dazzle & the Neon Fever.
- In 2005, Holmes moved from Chicago to Los Angeles and began deejaying extensively.
- In 2006, released Get Yer Yum-Yum's Out, which included one song featuring Rachael Yamagata.
- In 2006, produced Joshua Radin's breakout album We Were Here.
- In 2006, Holmes' songs "I Don't Care What My Friends Say" and "China" were featured prominently in the final episodes of season 3 of The O.C.
- In 2007, co-wrote a song on Mandy Moore's Wild Hope with Rachael Yamagata.
- In 2007, co-wrote a song on Hanson's The Walk.
- In 2008, produced Joshua Radin's Unclear Sky EP.

In 2009 Holmes contributed to a remake of The Velvet Underground & Nico as part of Beck's Record Club with noted producer Nigel Godrich and others. Holmes introduced Godrich to the DJ software Serato, which became "very important" to his production approach.

From 2008 to 2011, Holmes was part of Ashtar Command, an indie rock band composed of him and former Filter guitarist Brian Liesegang. Their album American Sunshine was put out on Holmes’ Privateer label and Shepard Fairey’s Obey imprint. It features Joshua Radin, Taylor Hanson, Har Mar Superstar, Alex Ebert, Rachael Yamagata, Priscilla Ahn, and Z Berg.

In 2011, Holmes formed DJ collective The Embassy with DJ Ana Calderon. It includes Brie Larson, Questlove, Godrich, Thom Yorke, and Win Butler.

== Recent ==
After hearing him deejay in South America, Paul McCartney requested that Holmes do something before McCartney's own Friday set at the Coachella Festival in 2009. Holmes created a mix of old Beatles covers along with McCartney's fan favorite "Temporary Secretary".

Holmes has worked with immersive technology company Cosm to create audio-visual experience “The Journey Within” in Los Angeles. The 87-foot-diameter 12K LED dome is located in Hollywood Park's retail district. The 65,000-square-foot facility will be able to host up to 1,700 guests.

Holmes co-produced a Devo documentary, Devo, directed by Chris Smith, which premiered at the Sundance Film Festival in January 2024. The film was nominated for Best Music Film at the 68th Annual Grammy Awards.

== Personal ==
Holmes is married and is based in Los Angeles, California.
