= Native American Literature Symposium =

Native American literature conference

The Native American Literature Symposium (NALS) is a Native American literature conference. It was founded in 2001. It is held at a tribal venue every spring. The NALS was first established by a group of independent scholars committed to creating a place where Native voices can be heard. The current director is Gwen N. Westerman of Minnesota State University, Mankato.

== Past speakers and special appearances ==
Since 2001, the NALS has brought in some voices and groups in Native America, specializing in areas such as: art, prose, poetry, film, religion, history, politics, music, philosophy, and science. Past guest speakers include:

- Heid Erdrich
- Linda Grover
- LeAnne Howe
- Simon Ortiz
- Santa Fe Indian School Spoken Word Program
