= Young Maylay discography =

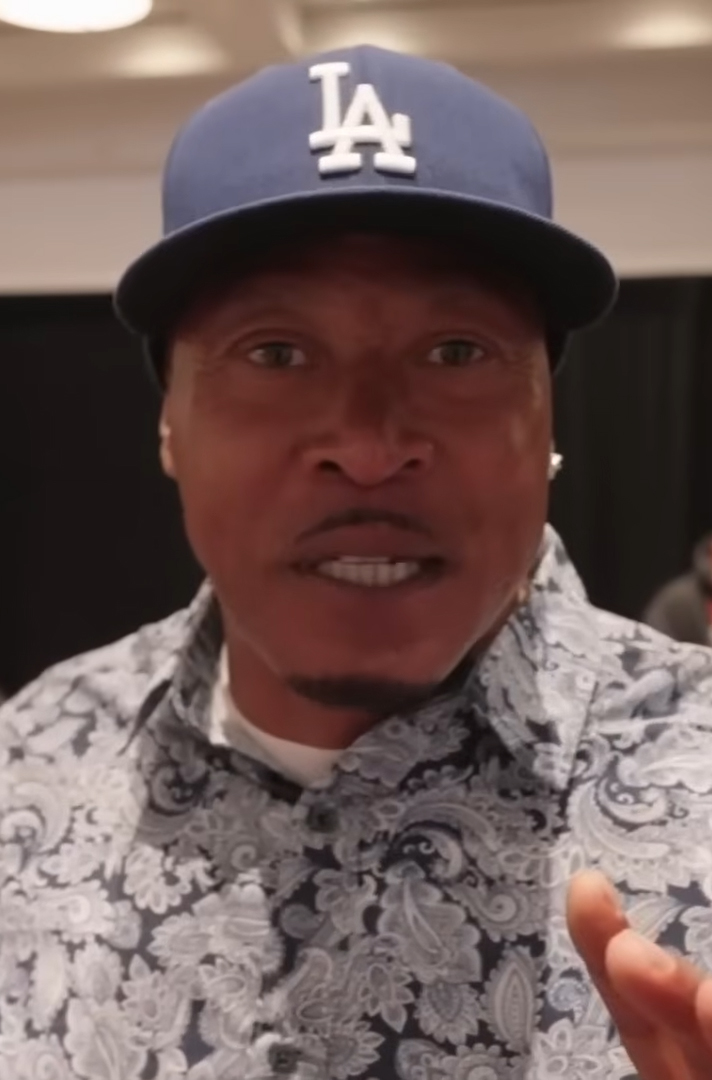
- Maylay in 2026
- Studio albums: 2
- Singles: 6
- Music videos: 10

This is the discography of Young Maylay, an American rapper, record producer, and voice actor.

== Mixtapes ==
Title	Mixtape details
San Andreas: The Original Mixtape	Released: July 5, 2005; Label: Maylaynium Muziq; Format: CD
The Real Coast Guard	Released: July 4, 2008; Label: Maylaynium Muziq; Format: CD

== Singles ==
Year	Title	Album
2006	"What Will It Be"	
2006	"Let's Get The Game Bacc Right"	Revolution In Progress The Movement
2009	"Ain't Nuttin' Changed (Remix)"	Tha Blaqprint
2013	"Let My Khakis Hang"	
2015	"I'm from L.A. (La La Land)"	
2016	"Runn the Blocc"	Which Way Iz West

== Guest appearances ==
Year	Song	Artist	Album
2000	”#1 Hottest Coast”	Killa Tay featuring Destruckto and Young Maylay	Thug Thizzle
2006	"What Will It Be"	Deeyah featuring Young Maylay	What Will It Be Single
2006	"Roll On 'Em"	DJ Crazy Toones featuring Xzibit, Young Maylay, MC Ren and WC	CT Experience
2006	"The Rat Pack"	DJ Crazy Toones featuring King T, Young Maylay, WC and Roscoe	CT Experience
2006	"We See You Niggas"	DJ Crazy Toones featuring WC, Jayo Felony and Young Maylay	CT Experience
2006	"Let's Get The Game Bacc Right"	OBG Rider Clicc (Young Dre the Truth, Young Maylay and Killa Polk)	Revolution In Progress The Movement
2006	"Bussin"	Problem featuring Young Maylay	Derang Entertainment Presents "Problem" Round 2 Knockout Punch!
2007	"Throwin Up The West"	Semi Auto featuring Young Maylay and Big Chill	The Weapon
2009	"Ain't Nuttin' Changed (Queensbridge To California Remix)"	Blaq Poet featuring Young Maylay and MC Eiht	DJ Premier Presents Get Used To Us
2009	"Temptation"	DJ Premier featuring Young Maylay	DJ Premier Presents Get Used To Us
2010	"Mic It"	Young Maylay	
2010	"Westcoast Blazin"	Y Eastwood featuring Young Maylay and Cali Hit Squad	The Cali Way
2010	"Too West Coast"	Ice Cube featuring WC and Young Maylay	I Am The West
2010	"Y'all Know How I Am"	Ice Cube featuring Doughboy, OMG, WC and Young Maylay	I Am The West
2010	"It's Official"	WC featuring Young Maylay and King T	That's What I'm Talking About - EP
2011	"International Papers"	DJ Zone featuring Young Maylay & WC	J. Wells Presents DJ Zone's Rhythm and Passion
2011	"You Know Me"	WC featuring Ice Cube and Young Maylay	Revenge of the Barracuda
2011	"The Spot"	WC featuring Young Maylay	Revenge Of The Barracuda
2011	"Best Kept Secret"	Soopafly featuring Goldie Loc, Young Maylay and Kokane	Best Kept Secret
2012	"Hood Tour"	W.C. featuring All-City, Young Maylay	Smoke With Me - hosted by Snoop Dogg
2012	"West Indeed"	Celly Cel featuring Young Maylay, Young Dre the Truth, Killa Polk and Dresta	Celly Cel Presents - Cali Luv
2012	"Parties & Funerals"	Snoopyblue featuring Young Maylay	Parties & Funerals L.I.F.E. of a Loc
2012	"Off The Radar"	E-A-Ski featuring Young Maylay and King T	Off The Radar - Single
2016	"Runn the Blocc"	MC Eiht featuring Young Maylay	Which Way Iz West

== Music videos ==
Year	Song	Artist	Album
2006	"What Will It Be"	Deeyah featuring Young Maylay	What Will It Be Single
2006	"Roll On 'Em"	DJ Crazy Toones featuring Xzibit, Young Maylay, MC Ren and WC	CT Experience
2006	"The Rat Pack"	DJ Crazy Toones featuring King T, Young Maylay, WC and Roscoe	CT Experience
2006	"We See You Niggas"	DJ Crazy Toones featuring WC, Jayo Felony and Young Maylay	CT Experience
2006	"Let's Get The Game Bacc Right"	OBG Rider Clicc	Revolution In Progress The Movement
2010	"Mic It"	Young Maylay	
2010	"Too West Coast"	Ice Cube featuring WC and Young Maylay	I Am The West
2010	"Y'all Know How I Am"	Ice Cube featuring Doughboy, OMG, WC and Young Maylay	I Am The West
2011	"You Know Me"	WC featuring Young Maylay and Ice Cube	Revenge of the Barracuda
2014	"Stay Alive"	Young Maylay featuring KingDavid Alegend	Hogg Tied & Duct Taped
