= Development of Grand Theft Auto V =

Development of 2013 video game

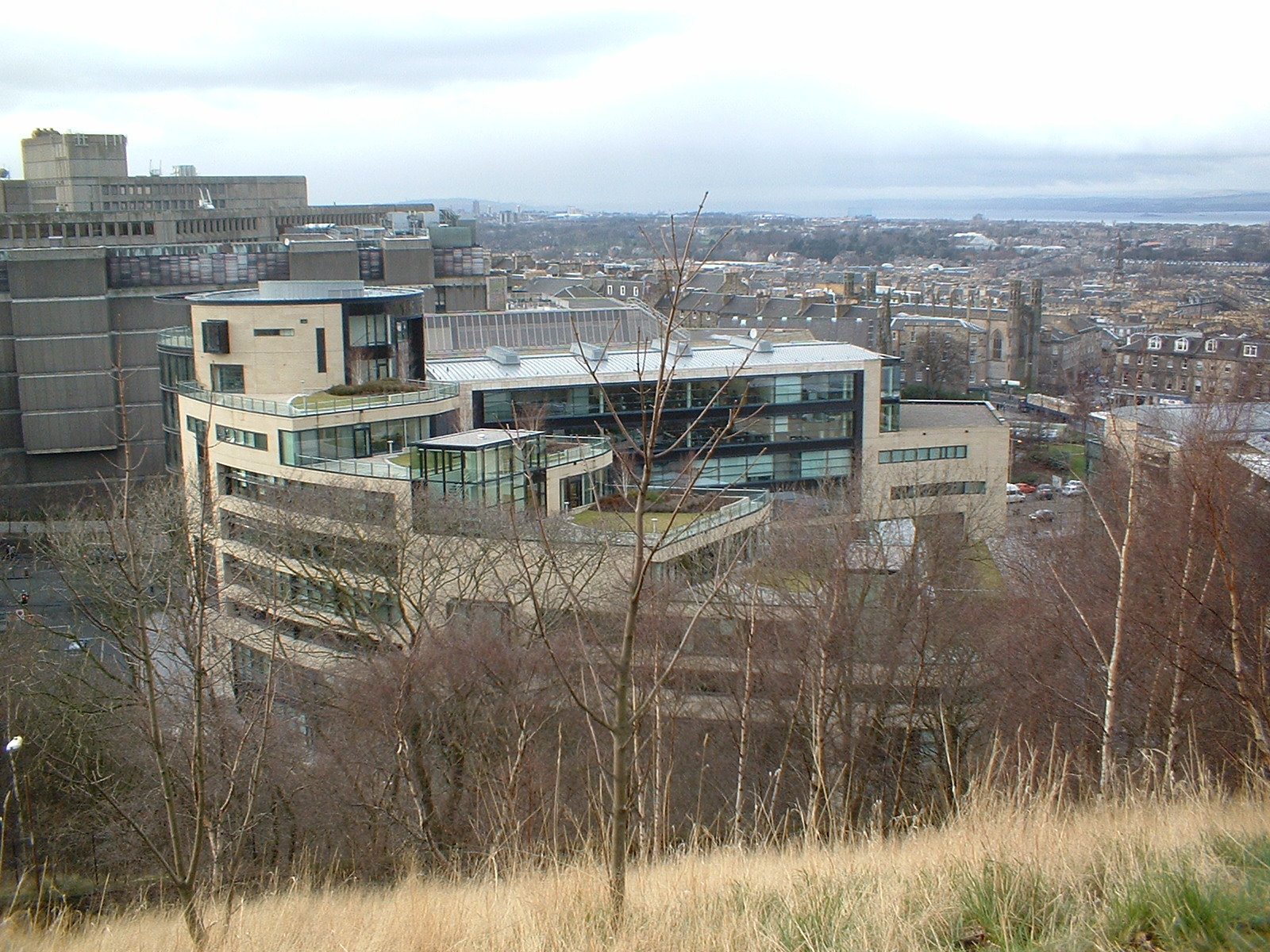
Rockstar North's former studio in Edinburgh, Scotland, where Grand Theft Auto V's development was overseen

A team of approximately 1,000 people developed Grand Theft Auto V over several years. Rockstar Games released the action-adventure game in September 2013 for PlayStation 3 and Xbox 360, in November 2014 for PlayStation 4 and Xbox One, in April 2015 for Windows, and in March 2022 for PlayStation 5 and Xbox Series X/S. The first main Grand Theft Auto series entry since Grand Theft Auto IV, its development was led by Rockstar North's core 360-person team, who collaborated with several other international Rockstar studios. The team considered the game a spiritual successor to many of their previous projects like Red Dead Redemption and Max Payne 3. After its unexpected announcement in 2011, the game was promoted with press showings, cinematic trailers, viral marketing strategies and special editions. Its release date, though subject to several delays, was widely anticipated.

The open world setting, modelled on Los Angeles and other areas of Southern California, constituted much of the development effort. Key team members conducted field trips around Southern California to gather research and footage, and Google Maps projections of Los Angeles were used to help design the city's road networks. The proprietary Rockstar Advanced Game Engine (RAGE) was overhauled to increase its draw distance rendering capabilities. For the first time in the series, players control three protagonists throughout the single-player mode. The team found the multiple-protagonist design a fundamental change to the story and gameplay devices. They refined the shooting and driving mechanics and tightened the narrative's pacing and scope.

The actors selected to portray the protagonists invested much time and research into character development. Motion capture was used to record the characters' facial and body movements. Like its predecessors, the game features an in-game radio that plays a selection of licensed music tracks. An original score was composed over several years by a team of five music producers. They worked in close collaboration, sampling and incorporating different influences into each other's ideas. The game's 2014 re-release added a first-person view option along with the traditional third-person view. To accommodate first-person, the game received a major visual and technical upgrade, as well as new gameplay features like a replay editor that lets players create gameplay videos.

== History and overview ==
The overhauled Rockstar Advanced Game Engine renders particle effects with greater detail than in Grand Theft Auto IV.

Preliminary work on Grand Theft Auto V began around Grand Theft Auto IV's release in April 2008; full development lasted approximately three years. Rockstar North's core 360-person team co-opted studios around the world owned by parent company Rockstar Games to facilitate development between a full team of over 1,000. These included Rockstar's Leeds, Lincoln, London, New England, San Diego and Toronto studios. Technical director Adam Fowler said that while development was shared between studios in different countries, the process involved close collaboration between the core team and others. This was necessary to avoid difficulties if studios did not communicate with each other as many game mechanics work in tandem. Game development ceased by 25 August 2013, when it was submitted for manufacturing. Media analyst Arvind Bhatia estimated the game's development budget exceeded US$137 million, and The Scotsman reporter Marty McLaughlin estimated that the combined development and marketing efforts exceeded £170 million (US$265 million), making it the most expensive video game ever made at its time.

The proprietary Rockstar Advanced Game Engine (RAGE) was overhauled for the game to improve its draw distance rendering capabilities, and the Euphoria and Bullet engines handle further animation and environment rendering tasks. The team found they could render the game world with greater detail than in Grand Theft Auto IV because they had become familiar with the PlayStation 3 and Xbox 360's hardware. Art director Aaron Garbut said that while the consoles' ageing hardware was tiring to work with, the team could still render detailed lighting and shadows and "maintain a consistent look". Vice president Dan Houser felt working on Grand Theft Auto IV with relatively new hardware was a challenge, but the team had since learnt to develop for the consoles more efficiently. The PlayStation 3, PlayStation 4 and Xbox One versions fit onto one Blu-ray Disc; Xbox 360 copies are distributed on two DVDs and require an 8 GB installation on the HDD or external storage device; while the Windows (PC) version takes up seven DVDs. The team asserted any differences between the PlayStation 3 and Xbox 360 versions would be negligible.

== Research and open world design ==
Initial work on Grand Theft Auto V constituted the open world creation, where preliminary models were constructed in-engine during pre-production. The game's setting is the fictional US state of San Andreas and city of Los Santos, based on Southern California and Los Angeles respectively. San Andreas was first used as Grand Theft Auto: San Andreas' setting, which featured three cities separated by open countryside. The team thought the ambition of including three cities in San Andreas was too high, as it did not emulate the cities as well as they had hoped. Houser felt an effective portrayal of Los Angeles needs to emulate its urban sprawl, and that dividing the workforce between multiple cities would have detracted from capturing "what L.A. is". Garbut said PlayStation 2 era technology lacked the technical capabilities to capture Los Angeles adequately, such that San Andreas' rendition of Los Santos looked like a "backdrop or a game level with pedestrians randomly milling about". The team disregarded San Andreas as a departure point for Grand Theft Auto V because they had moved on to a new generation of consoles and wanted to build the city from scratch. According to Garbut, game hardware had "evolved so much from San Andreas" that using it as a model would have been redundant. The team's focus on one city instead of three meant they could produce Los Santos in higher quality and at a grander scale than in the previous game.

The game reproduces several iconic Los Angeles landmarks like the Hollywood Sign, depicted in-game as the Vinewood Sign.

Los Angeles was extensively researched for the game. The team organised field research trips with tour guides and architectural historians, and captured around 250,000 photographs and many hours of video footage. Houser said, "We spoke to FBI agents that have been undercover, experts in the Mafia, street gangsters who know the slang—we even went to see a proper prison". He considered the open world's research and creation the most challenging aspects of the game's production. Google Maps and Street View projections of Los Angeles were used by the team to help design Los Santos' road networks. The team studied virtual globe models, census data and documentaries to reproduce the city's geographical and demographic spread. The team opted to condense the city's spread into an area players could comfortably traverse to capture "the essence of what's really there in a city, but in a far smaller area", according to Houser. The New Yorker's Sam Sweet opined that the "exhaustive field work ... wasn't conducted to document a living space. Rather, it was collected to create an extremely realistic version of a Los Angeles that doesn't actually exist". Garbut noted that Los Angeles was used merely as a starting point and that the team were not "dictated by reality" while building Los Santos.

The open world includes vast tracts of countryside around the city proper. Research took the team to California's rural regions; Garbut recalled a visit he took with Houser to Bombay Beach that inspired them to set Trevor's initial story against the Salton Sea. The team wanted a large world without open, empty areas and condensed Southern California's countryside into a detailed play space. The game world covers 49 square miles (130 km^{2})—about an eightieth of Los Angeles County. Its scale is greater than Rockstar's previous open world games; Garbut estimated it is large enough to fit San Andreas, Grand Theft Auto IV and Red Dead Redemption's worlds combined inside. To accommodate the world's size, the team overhauled the RAGE to improve its draw distance rendering capabilities. The large, open space permitted the re-introduction of fixed-wing aircraft, omitted from Grand Theft Auto IV because of its relatively smaller scale. "We wanted somewhere big [to let players] fly properly", Houser explained. Lead producer Leslie Benzies noted that to avoid a "hollow" countryside area, the team populated the open world with wildlife.

== Story and character development ==
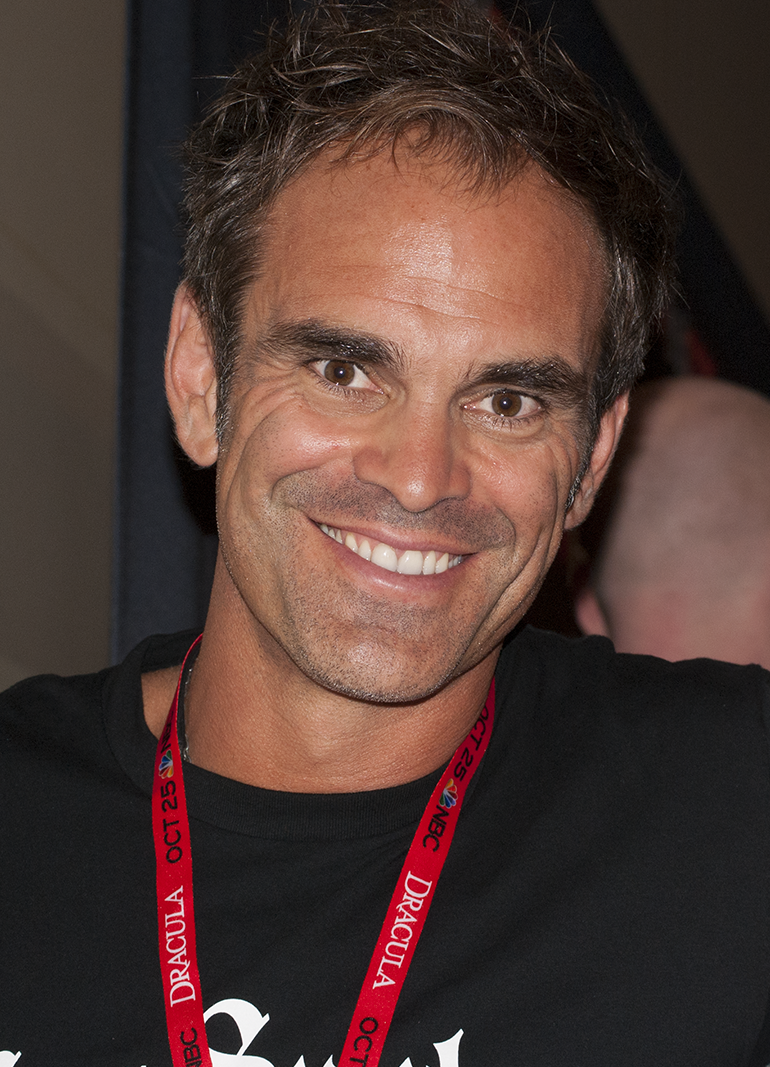
Steven Ogg portrayed Trevor Philips.

A single-player story revolving around three lead protagonists was one of Grand Theft Auto V's earliest design objectives. Garbut felt such a deviation from the gameplay's core structure was a risk, and recalled team concern that a departure from Grand Theft Auto's traditional, single lead character set-up "might backfire". Early game conceptualisations would have told three separate stories through different protagonists. Later, Grand Theft Auto IV's stories inspired the concept that story trajectories would meet throughout the game. Eventually, the concept evolved into three interconnected stories that intertwined through the missions. According to Benzies, the team made the multiple character formula "integral to the structure of the gameplay as well as the narrative". Houser opined that Grand Theft Auto V is their "strongest plotted game because the characters are so intertwined" and that the "meeting points [between the characters' stories] are very exciting".

The central story theme is the "pursuit of the almighty dollar". Missions follow the lead characters' efforts to plan and execute complicated heists to accrue wealth for themselves. The team focused on money as the central theme in response to the 2008 financial crisis, as its effects turn the main characters back to a life of crime. "We wanted this post-crash feeling, because it works thematically in this game about bank robbers", Houser explained. The positive reaction to Grand Theft Auto IV's "Three Leaf Clover" mission—an elaborate heist executed by lead protagonist Niko Bellic and accomplices—encouraged the team to develop the story around the heists. Houser said while "Three Leaf Clover" was well-received, the team had not captured the thrill of the robbery to their best abilities and wanted Grand Theft Auto V to achieve it. He felt a strong bank robbery mission "was a good device that we'd never used in the past. Repeating ourselves is a fear when we're doing games where part of the evolution is just technological".

The game has players control three characters: Michael De Santa, Franklin Clinton and Trevor Philips. The team wrote each character to embody a game protagonist archetype; Michael represents greed, Franklin ambition and Trevor insanity. Houser felt Michael and Trevor were written to juxtapose each other, with Michael "like the criminal who wants to compartmentalise and be a good guy some of the time" and Trevor "the maniac who isn't a hypocrite". He considered that the three lead characters helped move the game's story into more original territory than its predecessors, which traditionally followed a single protagonist rising through the ranks of a criminal underworld. Ned Luke portrayed Michael, Shawn "Solo" Fonteno portrayed Franklin, and Steven Ogg portrayed Trevor. Fonteno first became aware of the acting job through his friend DJ Pooh, who worked on San Andreas and was involved in Grand Theft Auto V's music production.

When Luke's agent advised him of the casting call, he initially did not want to audition for the part because it was in a video game. After reading the audition material and learning more about the project, he became interested. He reflected, "I went immediately after reading the material from 'I'm not doing it' to 'nobody else is doing it'. It was just brilliant". During the initial audition process, Ogg noticed on-set chemistry between him and Luke, which he felt helped secure them the roles. "When [Luke] and I went in the room together we immediately had something", he explained. While the actors knew their auditions were for Rockstar Games, it was not until they signed contracts that they learnt it was a Grand Theft Auto title.

Work for the actors began in 2010. Their performances were mostly recorded using motion capture technology. Dialogue for scenes with characters seated in vehicles was recorded in studios. Because the actors had their dialogue and movements recorded on-set, they found their performances no different to film or television roles. Their dialogue was scripted such that they could not ad-lib; however, with directorial approval, they sometimes made small changes to their performances. To prepare for his role as Michael, Luke gained 25 pounds and studied Rockstar's previous games, starting with Grand Theft Auto IV. He considered Michael's characterisation to be an amalgamation of Hugh Beaumont's portrayal of Ward Cleaver in the American sitcom Leave It to Beaver (1957–63) and Al Pacino's portrayal of Tony Montana in the 1983 film Scarface.

Ogg felt Trevor's characterisation developed over time. He said, "Nuances and character traits that began to appear—his walk, his manner of speech, his reactions, definitely informed his development throughout the game". Ogg cites Tom Hardy's portrayal of English criminal Charles Bronson in the 2008 biopic Bronson as a strong stylistic influence. He opined that while Trevor embodies the violent, psychopathic Grand Theft Auto anti-hero archetype, he wanted to evoke player sympathy for Trevor's story. "To elicit other emotions was tough, and it was the biggest challenge and it's something that meant a lot to me", Ogg explained. Fonteno felt growing up in South Los Angeles and being exposed to drug trafficking and gang culture authenticated his portrayal of Franklin. "I lived his life before ... He's been surrounded by drugs, the crime, living with his aunt—I lived with my grandmother—so there was a lot of familiarity", Fonteno said. Having not worked as an actor since portraying Face in the 2001 film The Wash, he sought counsel from Luke and Ogg to refine his acting skills.

== Gameplay design ==
Grand Theft Auto V's multiple protagonist design was envisioned to improve the series' core mechanics. The team sought to innovate game storytelling and negate stale familiarity by not evolving the gameplay's core structure. "We didn't want to do the same thing over again", said Houser. The multiple protagonist idea was first raised during San Andreas' development but contemporaneous hardware restrictions made it infeasible. Garbut explained, "It didn't work from a tech point of view because the three characters need three times as much memory, three types of animation and so on". After Grand Theft Auto IV's release, the team developed The Lost and Damned and The Ballad of Gay Tony, episodic content packages that followed new protagonists. The three interwoven stories received positive remarks, so the team structured Grand Theft Auto V around this model.

The development team found that players experienced greater freedom when controlling three characters in missions. Lead mission designer Imran Sarwar felt they opened up more strategic manoeuvres. He cited a combat scenario where Michael sets up at a sniper outpost to cover Trevor, who makes a frontal assault on the enemy position while Franklin manipulates flank points. Benzies felt character switching streamlines the interplay between free roam and linear mission gameplay, as it eliminates San Andreas' cumbersome long-distance drives to mission start points. Players may "explore the whole map without having to worry about the long drive back", according to Benzies. Houser noted the mechanic's use during missions negated long drives as well. The team implemented dynamic mission content throughout the open world, a feature borrowed from Red Dead Redemption. Dynamic missions present themselves while players explore the open world and may be accepted or ignored. In Los Santos, for example, players may encounter an armoured van and try to intercept it to steal its contents.

The team overhauled the game's shooting and driving mechanics to match the standards of its contemporaries. Public reception to the team's previous games (such as Grand Theft Auto IV, Red Dead Redemption and Max Payne 3) was considered during the process. To increase the pace of shootouts, the team removed hard locking—a central mechanic in Grand Theft Auto IV that instantly locks onto the enemy nearest to the crosshair. Associate technical director Phil Hooker found hard locking "too disorientating" and immersion-breaking, "as you didn't have to think about enemy locations". He said Grand Theft Auto IV players "just rely on holding and shooting until a target is dead", so Grand Theft Auto V introduces a timer that breaks the lock on a target after a few seconds. The team refined Red Dead Redemption's cover system for the game, with increased fluidity moving into and out of cover. Regarding the reworked vehicle mechanics, Houser felt the game took influence from racing games and corrected Grand Theft Auto IV's "boat-like" driving controls.

== Music production ==
"Welcome to Los Santos"
"Welcome to Los Santos", the game's main theme, was composed by Oh No. He collaborated with several other musicians to produce original music for the game.

Grand Theft Auto V is the first game in its series to use an original score. Music supervisor Ivan Pavlovich summarised the original score idea as "daunting", because it was unprecedented for a Grand Theft Auto game. Like most previous series entries, the game uses licensed music tracks provided by an in-game radio as well. Pavlovich hoped the original score would enhance the licensed music use, not detract from it. He further noted the balancing act between the score's "ambient subtext and tensions" and the game's on-screen action. To work on the score, Rockstar engaged The Alchemist, Oh No and Tangerine Dream with Woody Jackson, who had previously worked on Red Dead Redemption, L.A. Noire and Max Payne 3's music. The team of producers collaborated over several years to create more than twenty hours of music that scores both the game's missions and dynamic gameplay throughout the single-player and multiplayer modes.

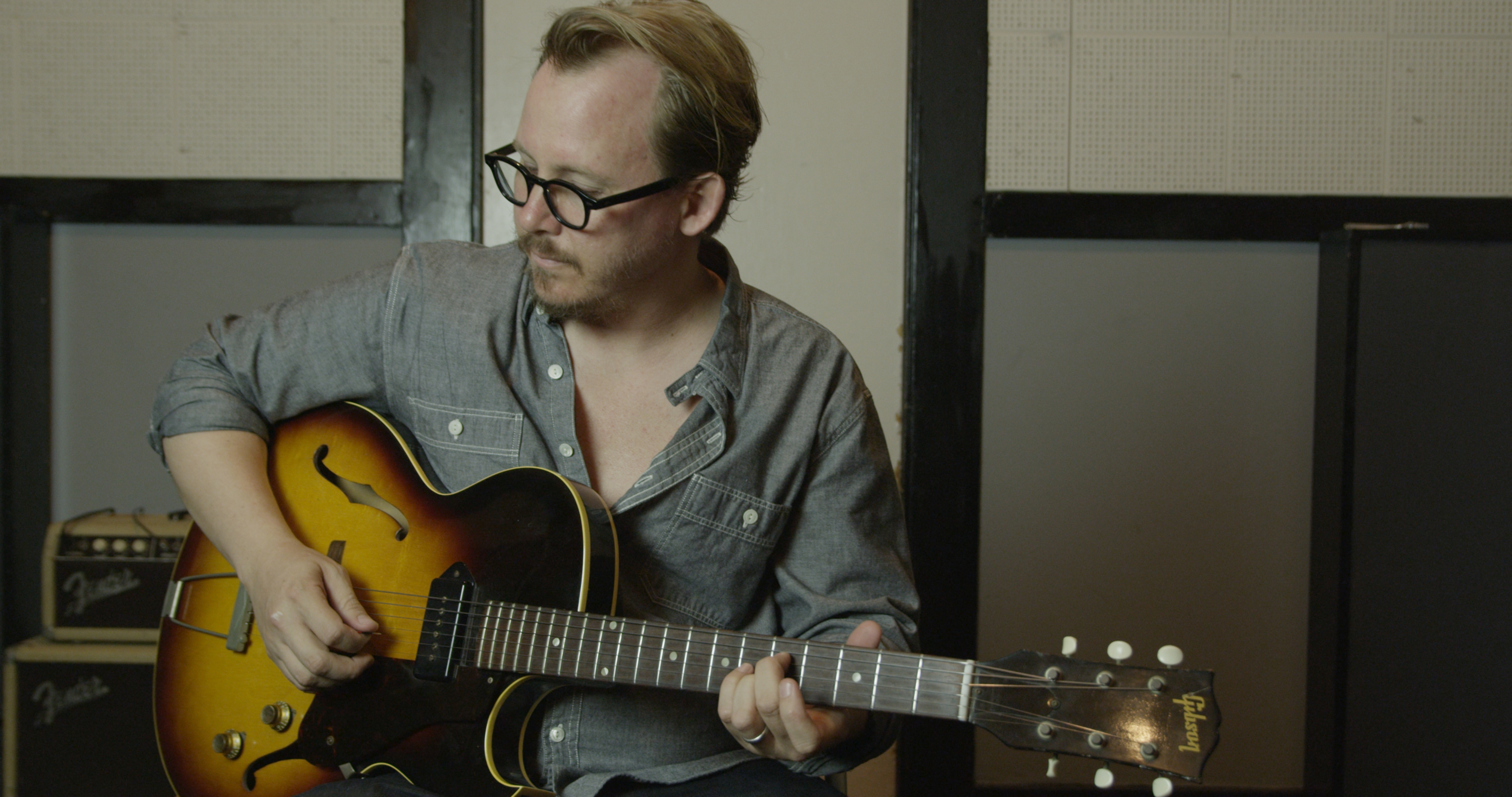
Woody Jackson, who had worked on several prior Rockstar games, collaborated with a team of producers to create more than twenty hours of original music for the game's soundtrack.

Early in the game's development, the music team were shown an early build before starting work on the score. Their work was mostly completed later in development, but they continued composing until its final build was submitted for manufacturing. Edgar Froese, Tangerine Dream's founding member, initially rejected the offer of producing music for a video game. After he was flown to the studio and shown the game, he was impressed by its scale and cinematic nature and changed his mind. Froese's first eight months of work on the score produced 62 hours of music. He recorded with Tangerine Dream in Austria, but further work was conducted at Jackson's United States studio, which The Alchemist and Oh No used as well.

Jackson's initial role was to provide the score for Trevor's missions, and he took influence from artists such as The Mars Volta and Queens of the Stone Age. When he learnt the team would be building off each other's work, he voiced concern that the finished product could be disjointed. After sharing his work with the team, however, he was particularly impressed by Froese's contributions. "Edgar evolved the music, made it into a whole other thing", Jackson said. Froese had interpolated funk sounds with Jackson's hip-hop influences. Froese and Jackson then sent their work between The Alchemist and Oh No, who heavily sampled it. The Alchemist opined, "We were sampling, taking a piece form [sic] here, a piece from there ... We pitched stuff up, chopped it, tweaked it. Then we chose the tracks that worked and everyone came in and layered on that". DJ Shadow then mixed the team's creations and matched them to the gameplay. Pavlovich considered "how to make the hip-hop and rock score not sound like they were instrumentals of songs on the radio, but rather something unique to the score" a challenge.

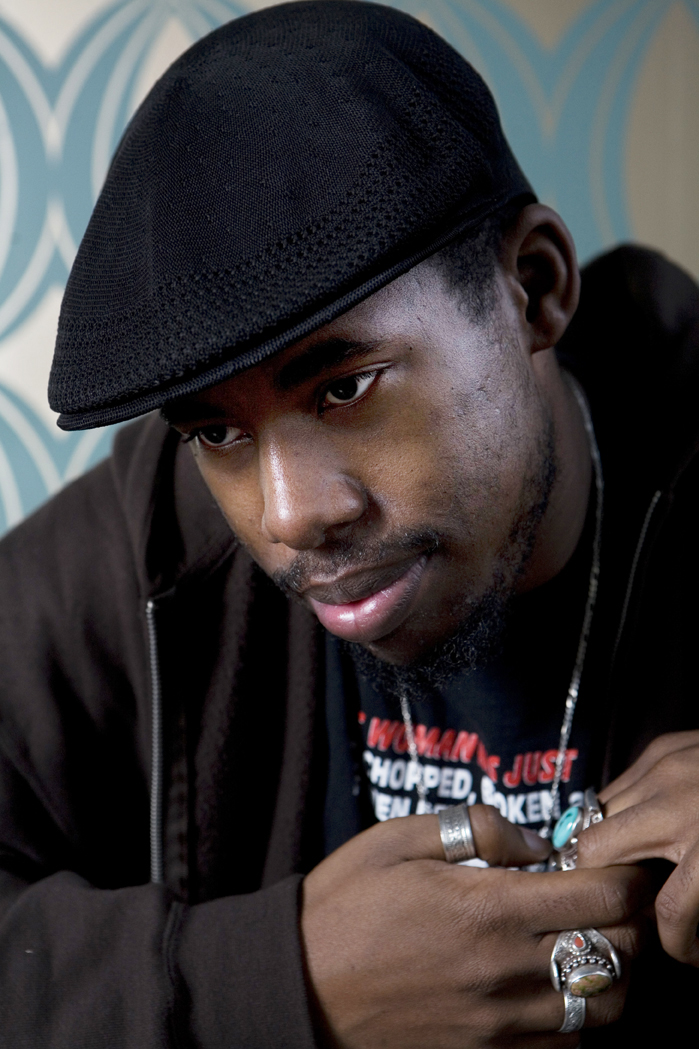
Flying Lotus hosts, and composed original music for, the in-game FlyLo FM radio station.

Pavlovich found that while Rockstar assigned the team missions to write music for, some of their random creations influenced other missions and sparked inspiration for further score development. He discussed a "stem-based" system used to make music fit dynamic game factors where the team would compose music to underscore outcomes players could make immediately after completing missions. Each of these stems, Froese reflected, included up to 62 five-minute WAV files, which were sent to Pavlovich in New York. "He then created, very professionally, a mix down for each of the eight stems needed for a mission and sent out the material to the other artists involved", Froese elaborated. Oh No drew from scenes within the game to make his work feel contextually pertinent with the action on-screen. The iconographic introduction of Los Santos early in the game, for example, inspired him to "create a smooth West Coast vibe that embodied" the city. He supplied horns, electric and bass guitars, and percussion parts to fit with the car chase scenes. "We wanted everything to set the right tone", he explained.

The Rockstar team wanted to synergise the game world's depiction of California with the radio stations by licensing tracks that imparted an appropriate "Cali feel". Pavlovich noted that Los Angeles' cultural saturation of pop music necessitated the Non-Stop-Pop FM station; he said "the first time you get off an airplane in L.A. and you hear the radio and the pop just seeps out ... We wanted that. It really connects you to the world". He felt that greater discernment was required for licensed music choices than in Grand Theft Auto IV because Grand Theft Auto V's music plays a pivotal role in generating Californian atmosphere. Music "reflects the environment in which the game is set", he said. Initially, the team planned to license over 900 tracks for the radio, but they refined the number to 241. The tracks are shared between fifteen stations, with an additional two talk-back stations and a radio station for custom audio files on the PC version. Some tracks were written specifically for the game, such as rapper and producer Flying Lotus' original work composed for the FlyLo FM station he hosts. Pavlovich noted how the team would first develop an idea of what each station would sound like, and then select a DJ to match the station's genre, such as Kenny Loggins who hosts the classic rock station Los Santos Rock Radio. He felt that to strike a balance between the radio and the score was a meticulous process, and cited a scenario where players would drive to a mission objective while listening to the radio, with the score taking over once players left the vehicle and proceeded to the mission's next stage.

== Release ==
During a September 2009 earnings call, Take-Two Interactive chief executive officer (CEO) Strauss Zelnick was asked about Grand Theft Auto V, the purported next game in the series. He replied, "We're not going to announce it, we're not going to announce when we are going to announce it, and we are not going to announce a strategy about announcing it or about when we are going to announce it either, or about the announcement strategy surrounding the announcement of the strategy". That November, Houser discussed with The Times his work on the series and the process that would be undertaken for the next Grand Theft Auto game. He expressed plans to co-write a thousand-page script and said that, when developing a new game, the team typically created a city and then developed the lead cast. In July 2010, Rockstar North posted seven job advertisements related to a new title. The company wanted to recruit environment artists, physics programmers and character animators—the latter advertisement asked for recruits with "professional experience developing a third person action game". Journalists wrote that the job listing was indicative of Grand Theft Auto V's existence. In June 2011, anonymous sources allegedly close to the developer told GameSpot the title was "well under way", with a 2012 release date likely.

Rockstar Games first confirmed the game's existence on 25 October 2011 in an announcement on its official website and Twitter feed. Take-Two Interactive's share price subsequently increased by seven per cent. Journalists said the announcement ignited significant anticipation within the gaming industry, which they owed to the series' cultural significance. The game did not meet its original projected March–May 2013 release date. By 30 October 2012, promotional posters had spread to the Internet, and a listing by the retailer Game had leaked the projected release date. Rockstar announced a scheduled Q2 2013 release that day and began accepting pre-orders on 5 November.

On 31 January 2013, the company announced the release date had been postponed until 17 September of that year. "It simply needs a little more polish to be of the standard we and, more importantly, you require", Rockstar stated in a press release. On 23 August, reports stated that some European PlayStation 3 users who had pre-ordered Grand Theft Auto V were able to download parts of the game, including its soundtrack and some character dialogue. Details of the game were leaked later that day and on following days before Sony removed the pre-order file from the European PlayStation Network and released an official apology to Rockstar and its fans. In response, Rockstar stated it was "deeply disappointed by leaks and spoilers being spread in advance of the game's launch". The game was released in Japan on 10 October. At E3 2014, a re-release of the game was announced for PC, PlayStation 4, and Xbox One. The PC version, initially scheduled for simultaneous release with the console versions, was delayed three times: first to 27 January 2015, later to 24 March and again to 14 April. According to Rockstar, the game required extra development time for "polishing". PlayStation 5 and Xbox Series X/S versions were announced in June 2020; originally scheduled for release on 11 November 2021, they were later pushed to March 2022, specified in February 2022 to 15 March. They feature additional technical enhancements and performance upgrades.

== Promotion ==
The game was extensively marketed through video trailers and press demonstrations. On 2 November 2011, a week after the announcement, the debut trailer was released. It is narrated by Michael and depicts the open world accompanied by the song "Ogdens' Nut Gone Flake" by English rock band Small Faces. A press release published the same day confirmed the game's open world recreation of Southern California and Los Angeles. Almost a year later, Game Informer ran a Grand Theft Auto V cover story for their December 2012 issue. Rockstar intended to release the second promotional trailer on 2 November. However, these plans were hampered by Hurricane Sandy, which cut power supplies to Rockstar's New York offices. The trailer was eventually released on 14 November; it introduces the lead protagonists' back-stories and features the song "Skeletons" by American musician Stevie Wonder.

To unveil the cover art, Rockstar contracted artists to paint a mural on a wall in Manhattan on 31 March 2013, followed by the artwork's digital release on 2 April. It showed English model Shelby Welinder portraying a blonde beach-goer. Three trailers were released on 26 April, each focusing on one of the protagonists. The songs "Radio Ga Ga" by English band Queen, "Hood Gone Love It" by American rapper Jay Rock, and "Are You Sure Hank Done It This Way" by American musician Waylon Jennings are used in the Michael, Franklin and Trevor trailers respectively.

A trailer released on 9 July features the first gameplay footage. It demonstrates the shooting and driving mechanics, and the ability to swap between characters instantaneously. Grand Theft Auto Online was unveiled in a trailer released on 15 August. The video displayed activities like bank heists, small robberies, "traditional" game modes, purchase of property and bicycle riding. The final pre-launch trailer was released on 29 August, intended to be a television advertisement. The song "Sleepwalking" by American band The Chain Gang of 1974 was used in this trailer.

Viral marketing strategies were used to promote the game. Visitors to the website of The Epsilon Program—a fictional religious cult within the Grand Theft Auto universe—were offered a chance to register for that group. After filling in an online membership form, the terms and conditions revealed that the site was a casting call for five people to appear in the game as members of the fictional cult. The official Grand Theft Auto V website was redesigned on 13 August 2013 to show a preview of activities and locales within the open world and an examination of the lead protagonists' stories. More information was released on the website on 24 August, 6 September, and 13 September.

To spur pre-order sales, Rockstar collaborated with several retail outlets to provide special edition versions of the game. The "Special Edition" includes a unique case packaging, a game map and unlock codes for additional content in the single-player and multiplayer modes. The publisher collaborated with Sony to release a 500 GB PlayStation 3 console, which includes a copy of the game, 30-day trial membership for the PlayStation Plus service, and set of Grand Theft Auto V-branded headphones. All game pre-orders granted the purchaser an access code for the in-game Atomic Blimp aircraft. GameStop held a promotional raffle with the chance to win a real-life Bravado Banshee sports car (the game's counterpart of the Dodge Viper). Rockstar collaborated with West Coast Customs to build the vehicle.

Editions of Grand Theft Auto V
Features	Standard	Special Edition	Collector's Edition	Re-release
Game disc	Yes	Yes	Yes	Yes
Access to Atomic Blimp	Pre-order only	Pre-order only	Pre-order only	Yes
Steelbook with "V" logo artwork	No	Yes	Yes	No
Blueprint map (Los Santos and Blaine County)	No	Yes	Yes	No
Special ability boost	No	Yes	Yes	No
Stunt plane trials	No	Yes	Yes	Yes
Bonus outfits, tattoos, etc.	No	Yes	Yes	Yes
Additional weapons	No	Yes	Yes	Yes
Security deposit bag	No	No	Yes	No
Grand Theft Auto V key	No	No	Yes	No
New Era cap	No	No	Yes	No
Custom Grand Theft Auto Online characters	No	No	Yes	Yes
Unique vehicles and garage property	No	No	Yes	Yes
Rockstar Editor	No	No	No	Yes

Shortly after the game's release, the iFruit application was released for iOS devices. It let players customise vehicles, create custom license plates and teach Franklin's dog Chop new tricks, which unlocked additional in-game abilities. Upon its launch, some users reported problems connecting to the application's servers; these problems were resolved with an update on 25 September 2013. iFruit was released for Android on 29 October, and for Windows Phone devices on 19 November. A PlayStation Vita port was released on 1 April 2014. Rockstar stopped supporting the application on 12 December 2022.

== Re-release ==
There's something incredible about running around this world in first-person, glancing down at Trevor's hands, now your hands and seeing the tattoos, the dirt under his nails ... And then with a click you're in third person and there's your character again in front of you—it's a whole other new experience.

— Aaron Garbut, Rockstar art director, IGN, 5 November 2014

The enhanced version for PC, PlayStation 4, and Xbox One features an increased draw distance, finer texture details, denser traffic, upgraded weather effects, and new wildlife and vegetation. It features more than 162 new songs across the game's radio stations. Players could transfer Grand Theft Auto Online characters and progression between some platforms and gain exclusive activities and in-game discounts on weapons and vehicles. The re-release features a new on-foot first-person view option that players may configure to personal preference (for example, by making the view toggle to third-person when taking cover). Animation director Rob Nelson said that a first-person option was raised during PlayStation 3 and Xbox 360 development, but their relatively smaller banks of memory were already being pushed, such that adding new first-person animations would have inhibited the open-world render. According to Nelson, the first-person view required more development effort than simply repositioning the camera, because of the need to adapt combat to a different view. The weapons were upgraded to a higher resolution, and new animations including weapon recoil, reload and switch were added. "I think we created 3,000 animations on weapons alone", said Nelson.

The PlayStation 4 version uses the DualShock 4's touchpad to navigate camera options and speaker to play smartphone calls, while the Xbox One Controller's "Impulse Triggers" may rumble while players use vehicles. The PC version features the "Rockstar Editor", a replay editor that lets players create video clips of their gameplay. It features a "Director Mode" that lets players record footage with various characters that speak and perform contextual actions at will. Players can adjust the time of day and weather settings, and use cheat codes to access more cinematic effects. An editing suite lets players add music from the game's soundtrack and score, and access various depth of field and filter effects. Finished works may be uploaded directly to YouTube and entered into Rockstar Games Social Club contests. Later, the PlayStation 4 and Xbox One versions received the Rockstar Editor through a free title update, which added various features such as expanded sound effects and text styles libraries across all three platforms.

The PlayStation 4 version (left) of the game features greater draw distances and higher-quality textures than the PlayStation 3 version (right).

Art director Aaron Garbut said the addition of first-person inspired the enhanced version's graphical upgrade. Remodelled cars feature interior effects including functional speedometers, fuel gauges and dashboard handbrake lights. The team added new particle and lighting effects, "like fireflies at night in the countryside, or ambient light pollution over Los Santos at night", according to Garbut. Red Dead Redemption inspired the team to add more vegetation to "break up the hard edges [and] straight lines" of the open world. The original version's vegetation was replaced with more detailed equivalents in the enhanced version. An upgraded weather system lets tree branches and leaves blow realistically in the wind. The team hand-placed weeds along fences and walls and placed grass over many of the open world's terrains. They then layered foliage, rocks and litter over the grass. An upgraded screen space ambient occlusion (SSAO) system renders new particle, shadow and weather effects, such as volumetric fog or neon reflections in cars at night. The ambient light pollution over nighttime Los Santos may dissipate in poor weather. A dynamic depth of field system sharpens and softens images to emulate camera autofocus, and improved shaders produce new colours in skin and terrain textures.

Initial PC version development began in parallel with PlayStation 3 and Xbox 360. PC development later gave way as the focus shifted to the console releases but eventually resumed. Because the team had planned a PC version from early on, they made technical decisions in advance to facilitate later development, like support for 64-bit computing and DirectX 11. The art team authored their source art at high resolutions even though they needed to be compressed on the PlayStation 3 and Xbox 360, with the foresight that PC versions would display these assets uncompressed. These early decisions aided the PlayStation 4 and Xbox One versions' development as well, due to their similar system architectures to the PC. Their similarities helped the team "ramp up" to the PC version, where they could push the visuals and technology further than before. The PC development team consisted of members of the original team and PC specialists from Rockstar's other studios who had brought Grand Theft Auto IV, Max Payne 3 and L.A. Noire to the platform. The PC's recommended specifications are based on the game running a native 1080p resolution at 60 frames per second (fps); the team suggested 60 fps as the optimal performance benchmark. The PC build also supports 4K resolution and uncapped framerates. The team opted to give players the choice to configure the game according to their system specifications. Players may configure LOD draw distances, anisotropic filtering, graphics effects and so on. A population density slider affects the density of street-walking pedestrians and cars on the roads.
