= Carl Johnson (Grand Theft Auto) =

Protagonist of the 2004 video game Grand Theft Auto: San Andreas

- Grand Theft Auto character
- Carl Johnson's official artwork
- First appearance: Grand Theft Auto: San Andreas (2004)
- Last appearance: The Introduction (2004)
- Created by: Rockstar North
- Voiced by: Young Maylay
- Motion capture: Young Maylay

In-universe information
- Nickname: CJ
- Affiliation: Grove Street Families
- Family: Beverly Johnson (mother); Sean "Sweet" Johnson (brother); Kendl Johnson (sister); Brian Johnson (brother)
- Origin: Los Santos, San Andreas, United States
- Nationality: American

Carl Johnson, also known as "CJ", is a fictional character and the playable protagonist of the action-adventure game Grand Theft Auto: San Andreas (2004), the fifth main installment in Rockstar Games' Grand Theft Auto series. He is voiced by Young Maylay, who also provided some motion capture.

Carl is the second-in-command of the Grove Street Families (GSF), a street gang based in the fictional city of Los Santos (inspired by Los Angeles). The gang is led by Carl's brother, Sweet, with whom he became estranged following the death of their younger brother Brian. After five years spent in Liberty City, Carl returns to Los Santos to attend his recently murdered mother's funeral, and is drawn back into the gangster lifestyle as he attempts to rebuild the GSF's power. Carl's quest to find the truth behind his mother's death leads him to develop alliances, take on rival gangs, and build up his own criminal empire while clashing with other criminals and corrupt authorities.

Unlike Tommy Vercetti in Grand Theft Auto: Vice City (2002), who was voiced by veteran Hollywood actor Ray Liotta, Rockstar Games sought a little-known actor to portray Carl, relegating celebrity voice talent to secondary roles. Executive producer Sam Houser felt that a then-unknown Young Maylay made Carl feel more human. The character received critical acclaim, with praise going to his complexity, lack of stereotype and his sense of conscience, and is regarded as one of the greatest video game characters of all time.

== Concept and design ==
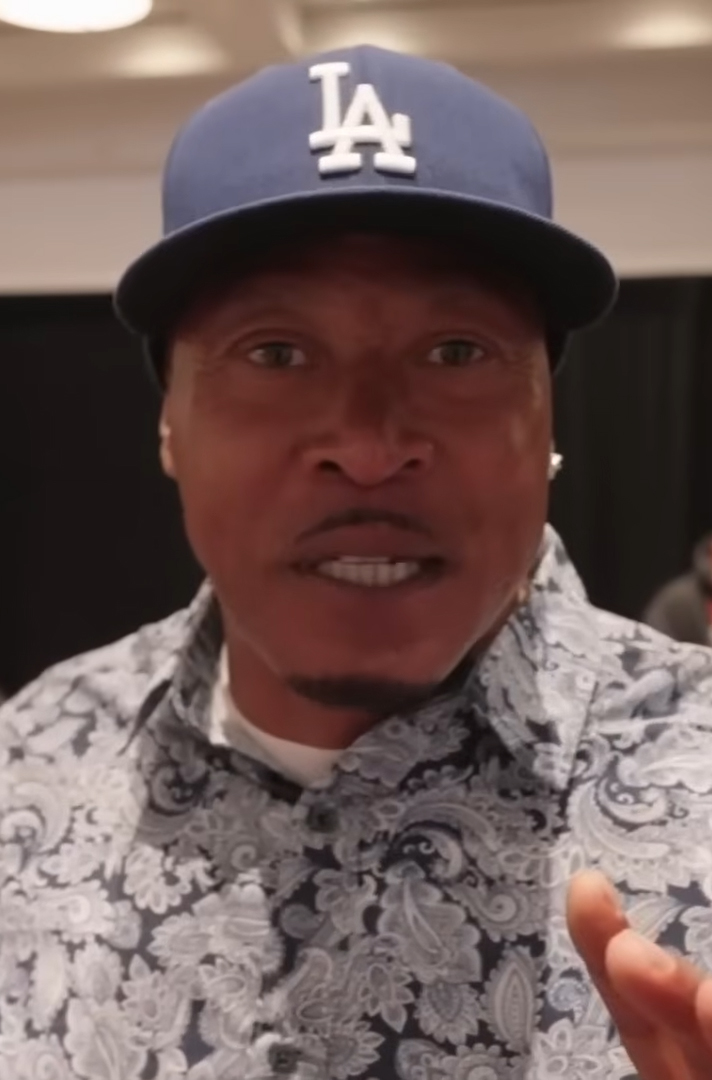
Young Maylay (pictured in 2026) voiced and served as the likeness for CJ.

Carl "CJ" Johnson has over 7,700 lines of dialogue in Grand Theft Auto: San Andreas: more than 3,500 in cutscenes, and over 4,200 in the open world. Executive producer Sam Houser sought an unknown actor for CJ as he found Ray Liotta's performance as Tommy Vercetti in Vice City "conflicting"; he opted to cast celebrities in secondary roles. Developer Rockstar North asked Young Maylay to audition after overhearing him speak with co-writer DJ Pooh. He auditioned in Los Angeles; for one audition, he read parts of the script for Menace II Society (1993). He was cast in the role, his first acting performance, a few weeks after auditioning, and recorded for about a month in New York City. He felt the developers gave him freedom to insert his own personality into CJ. Houser felt Maylay's obscurity in the industry made CJ feel "very, very human".

The team aimed for CJ to be "the most human" character they had developed, ensuring he had "the most intense story around him" to allow the player to identify with him. DJ Pooh compared CJ to rapper and actor Tupac Shakur in that he is "fiercely dedicated" to his family but becomes "cold-blooded" when necessary. CJ's physical appearance was modelled after Maylay. He said he was influenced by his own life when portraying the character: "I put Maylay on CJ. I make him as much me as I can, without too much changing of the script".

San Andreas introduced role-playing elements to customize CJ's accessories, clothing, hairstyles, and tattoos. Balancing food and physical activity impacts CJ's appearance and physical attributes; eating and exercising maintains health. The team felt that the ability to adjust CJ's weight helped the player to feel as though their actions could have consequences in the game. Dan Houser felt CJ's customizability allowed the player to better connect with the character. Maylay recorded several variations of different lines in consideration of CJ's weight fluctuations.

In December 2010, Michael "Shagg" Washington, a former backup singer for the hip hop group Cypress Hill, sued publisher Rockstar Games and its parent company Take-Two Interactive for US$250 million, alleging that CJ's story and physical appearance drew heavily from his own without compensation. Rockstar had interviewed Washington in 2003 regarding his former life as a gang member, and he was credited for his modeling work in the game. The Los Angeles County Superior Court dismissed Washington's case in May 2011, seconded by the California Courts of Appeal in October 2012, ruling that he failed to prove that CJ's appearance was not transformative.

== Appearances ==
CJ is the playable protagonist of Grand Theft Auto: San Andreas. Outside the game, his only other physical appearance was in The Introduction, a short prologue film included in the special edition of San Andreas for the PlayStation 2. Born in the Ganton neighborhood of Los Santos to Beverly Johnson and an unnamed father, CJ had one older brother, Sean (nicknamed "Sweet"), and two younger siblings: his sister Kendl and brother Brian. CJ's father abandoned the family when CJ was still young, and as a result he barely remembers him, at one point claiming that "[he] never really had a father." Growing up, CJ befriended Melvin "Big Smoke" Harris and Lance "Ryder" Wilson, two boys who lived in the same neighborhood, and they often engaged in criminal activities alongside Sweet and Brian. After Sweet joined the Grove Street Families (GSF), one of the most powerful street gangs in Los Santos, he eventually became its leader and inducted CJ, Brian, Big Smoke, and Ryder into the gang. In 1987, Brian was killed, and Sweet blamed CJ for the tragedy, straining their relationship. This, coupled with the GSF's loss of influence caused by Sweet's staunch opposition against the growing drug trade, caused CJ to move to Liberty City in search of better opportunities.

After five years in Liberty City, where he worked as a car thief for Mafia member Joey Leone, CJ is contacted by Sweet in 1992 and told that their mother was killed in a drive-by shooting. CJ returns to Los Santos to attend Beverly's funeral, but is intercepted by officers Frank Tenpenny, Eddie Pulaski, and Jimmy Hernandez, three members of the city's community policing unit, Community Resources Against Street Hoodlums (CRASH). Tenpenny warns CJ that he intends to frame him for the murder of fellow officer Ralph Pendlebury, who was killed by CRASH after discovering their corruption, and forces him to do his bidding in exchange for his family's safety. After reuniting with his friends and family at Beverly's funeral, CJ is informed of the GSF's weakened state and agrees to stay in Los Santos and help rebuild the gang's power. He reclaims their lost turf from their rivals, reunites the splintered GSF sets, and secures an alliance with the Varrios Los Aztecas gang by befriending its leader, Cesar Vialpando, who is dating Kendl.

While Sweet organizes an ambush against the GSF's main rivals, the Ballas, CJ and Cesar witness Big Smoke and Ryder helping Tenpenny and the Ballas hide the car used in the attack that killed Beverly. Realizing his friends have betrayed the GSF and that Sweet is walking into a trap, CJ tries to save his brother, but they both end up arrested. While Sweet is incarcerated, Tenpenny takes CJ to the countryside and uses his brother's life as leverage to force him to eliminate witnesses to CRASH's corruption. During his exile, CJ makes several new allies, including an ageing hippie and marijuana farmer named "the Truth", blind Triad leader Wu Zi Mu, and Cesar's psychotic cousin Catalina. After assisting Catalina with several robberies, CJ wins a garage in a street race against Catalina's new boyfriend, Claude, and moves to San Fierro. With Cesar and Kendl's help, he turns the garage into a profitable chop shop, and also buys a car dealership, using it as a front for a vehicle theft ring.

During this time, CJ strengthens his ties with the Triads by helping Wu Zi Mu defeat a local Vietnamese gang, and encounters the Loco Syndicate, a drug cartel supplying Big Smoke and Ryder with crack cocaine. With the aid of Cesar and the Triads, CJ destroys the Syndicate and exacts revenge on Ryder. However, the Syndicate's enigmatic leader, Mike Toreno, later contacts CJ and reveals himself as an undercover government agent. In return for Sweet's freedom, Toreno enlists CJ's aid with several shady operations, which require him to purchase an abandoned airstrip. While living on the airstrip, CJ is reunited with the Truth, who asks him to steal a $60 million jetpack from the Area 69 military base and a mysterious green substance from a U.S. Army train. He later relocates to Las Venturas to help Wu Zi Mu open a casino and plan a robbery of the rival Mafia-run casino, Caligula's Palace. The heist is carried out successfully, and CJ befriends Caligula's manager Ken Rosenberg, helping him escape the clutches of Mafia boss Salvatore Leone.

In the meantime, CJ continues working for CRASH until Tenpenny betrays him and orders Pulaski to kill CJ; he survives thanks to Hernandez's intervention and kills Pulaski. CJ also meets and saves the life of famous rapper Madd Dogg, whose career he inadvertently ruined while helping his friend, OG Loc, launch his own career. After becoming Madd Dogg's manager, CJ returns to Los Santos to retake the rapper's mansion from drug dealers. Meanwhile, Toreno upholds his promise and secures Sweet's release from prison. CJ reunites with his brother and tells him about his exploits, but Sweet is unimpressed and chastises CJ for running away from his responsibilities again. Working together, CJ and Sweet gradually rebuild the GSF and track down Big Smoke, whom the former confronts and kills inside his crack palace. As Tenpenny arrives to collect his share of Big Smoke's money, he attempts to kill CJ before fleeing in a firetruck. CJ and Sweet give chase, and Tenpenny is mortally wounded after losing control of the truck and falling off the bridge overlooking Grove Street. CJ, his friends and family watch as Tenpenny dies of his injuries before heading to the Johnson house to celebrate their success.

== Reception ==
CJ's popularity made him the subject of unofficial conversions of his character model to various video games, such as in Guitar Hero World Tour (2008).

Carl Johnson received critical acclaim after the release of Grand Theft Auto: San Andreas, and has been included in many lists of the best characters in video games. Official U.S. PlayStation Magazine's John Davison considered CJ "possibly one of the most well-developed and believable videogame characters ever made" due to his layered personality and realistic behavior; 1Up.com's Parish concurred but felt CJ's kind nature made his in-game actions less believable, a problem that may have been circumvented through a branching narrative. IGN's Jesse Schedeen felt, of all series protagonists, "few are as compelling or flat out badass" as CJ, praising the customization. CraveOnline Media's Paul Tamburro wrote that "it was refreshing to take control of a character who was considerate about when and when not to commit wanton mass-slaughtering", and Matthew Cooper of Sabotage Times said CJ "was the first to appear with a conscience, the first that didn't seem to enjoy killing copious numbers of people".

GameDaily listed CJ among their list of the best black characters in video games, refusing the idea that he reinforces negative stereotypes since he is "more ghetto-born James Bond than straight-up gangsta". Similarly, Larry Hester of Complex Gaming named CJ the "gangbanger with a good heart." In 2012, GamesRadar wrote "few [Grand Theft Auto] heroes have been as charismatic as him, and few likely will in the future". In 2008, The Age called CJ "the most humble" of Grand Theft Auto anti-heroes and "one of the first strong African-American lead characters in any major videogame". Game Informer's Matt Helgeson felt "he could have easily been another gangster stereotype, but by the end of San Andreas we see CJ as a flawed, but ultimately good man who did the best he could in the worst of circumstances." In 2011, readers of Guinness World Records Gamer's Edition voted Carl "CJ" Johnson as the 22nd top video game character of all time.

CJ won Hero of 2005 at the Golden Joystick Awards. At G-Phoria, CJ nominated for Favorite Character and Young Maylay for Best Voice Performance – Male.

=== Fan use in other games ===
Due to CJ's popularity and relative simplicity of his character model, unofficial conversions of the CJ model to various video games has become a humorous "tradition" and an informal test item in the modding community especially whenever a game receives support for modifications, in similar vein to Doom (1993) being ported to every computing platform. Aleksandr Silantev, an architectural artist at GSC Game World who worked on S.T.A.L.K.E.R. 2: Heart of Chornobyl (2024), reportedly released a CJ mod for the game–among other mods based on popular internet memes–as a proof-of-concept for an official modding toolkit for S.T.A.L.K.E.R. 2.
