= What Will It Be =

Single by Deeyah featuring Young Maylay
- Released: 2006
- Genre: Protest song, Pop, electronica, dance, Political hip hop
- Length: 3:47
- Songwriter(s): Deeyah, C. Bellard

"What Will It Be" is a digital single by Deeyah Khan, featuring guest performance rap by Los Angeles based rapper Young Maylay. This was Young Maylay's first appearance in a single.

What Will It Be was to be Deeyah's second single in the UK after a successful Top 30 release of Plan of My Own. The music video for What Will It Be was filmed in Mumbai, India. Throughout the music video people are shown removing tape from their mouths to illustrate a need for expressive freedom, particularly concerning women's right's, a woman's freedom of choice as well as sexuality. It is also, according to Deeyah, a response to critics that would hope to silence her musical voice and who have threatened Deeyah throughout her career in an attempt limit her freedom of expression. In Deeyah's view, the Muslim community needs to examine its own place in the world and treatment of women before turning its judgment outward towards the West. The video also refers to the double standards and hypocrisy of strictly patriarchal cultures based on honor and shame.

In reoccurring scenes throughout the music video, images of individuals, especially women, are projected on Deeyah's bare back. Every person is someone who was murdered for his or her individual choices.

The music video for What Will It Be was pulled from rotation as threats of violence mounted against UK television and music stations by the Muslim community increased. In the wake of these controversies, local Asian music channel B4U Music banned her videos. In a statement to UK newspapers a B4U network's representative stated they "have received threats that has forced them to take the matter seriously". .

What Will It Be received the Freedom to create award in 2008. The music video was also shown as part of an art exhibition for freedom of expression in Stedelijk Museum, Netherlands.

Eventually, due to demand, "What Will It Be" was made available as a digital download only release on iTunes. Although this was to be Deeyah's last single due to concerns over personal safety.
