= Young Maylay =

American rapper (born 1979)

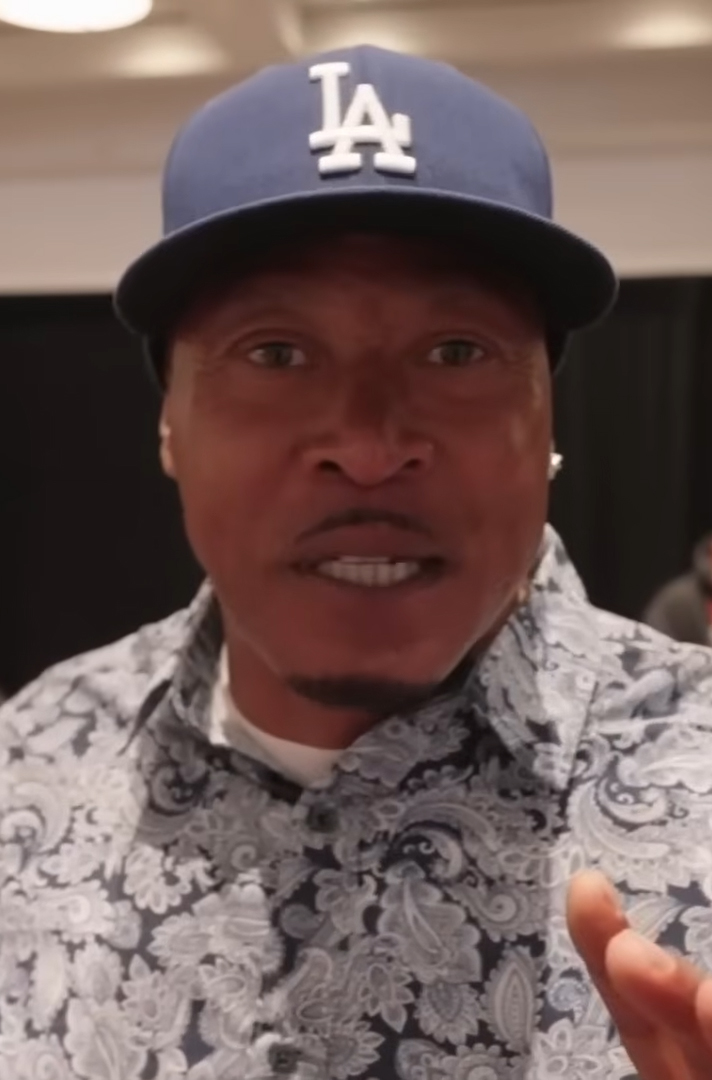
- Maylay in 2026
- Born: Christopher Bellard; June 17, 1979 (age 47); Los Angeles, California, U.S.
- Occupations: Rapper; record producer; voice actor
- Years active: 2000–present
- Known for: Portrayal of Carl Johnson in Grand Theft Auto: San Andreas
- Relatives: Shawn Fonteno (cousin)
- Musical career
- Genres: West Coast hip-hop; G-funk; gangsta rap; trip hop
- Instrument: Vocals
- Labels: Maylaynium Muziq; Lench Mob
- Member of: OBG Rider Clicc

Christopher Bellard (born June 17, 1979), known professionally as Young Maylay, is an American rapper, record producer, and voice actor based in Los Angeles, California. He is best known for his portrayal of Carl "CJ" Johnson, the main character of the action-adventure game Grand Theft Auto: San Andreas (2004).

== Early life ==
Christopher Bellard was born and raised in Los Angeles, California. Growing up in poverty, in a crime-ridden neighborhood, amid gang violence and gangsta rap inspired his rapping career. He grew up with close affiliates of the Crips gang. Bellard is the younger cousin of actor and rapper Shawn Fonteno, who would later voice and provide motion capture for the character Franklin Clinton in the video game Grand Theft Auto V (2013).

== Music career ==
=== Early years: 2000–2005 ===
His rapping career eventually took off in 2000, at the age of 21. With help from King T, Maylay made his first appearance in Killa Tay's Thug Thisle, with the song "#1 Hottest Coast (Killa Cali)" in 2000. Later he appeared in Rodney-O & Joe Cooley's Summer Heat in 2002. Since then, he has been featured on many releases across the West Coast. Maylay wrote the majority of King T's studio album Ruthless Chronicles. He founded his independent label in 2005 with the money from Grand Theft Auto: San Andreas and released his debut mixtape in the same year.

=== Pre-Lench Mob: 2006–2008 ===
In 2006, Maylay was featured in Deeyah Khan's single "What Will It Be" with a music video. In the same year, he appeared in DJ Crazy Toones' CT Experience, it was the first collaboration of the trio DJ Crazy Toones, WC and Young Maylay. In 2007 the trio began working in Maylay's studio album The Real Coast Guard. The album was released in 2008 and later that year, WC signed Young Maylay to Bigg Swang/Lench Mob.

=== Lench Mob days: 2008–present ===
Lench Mob Records were set in 2006 to put out Ice Cube's and WC's records, but later other artists were signed, like Young Maylay, who is considered a veteran by Ice Cube. DJ Crazy Toones created two blogs for Maylay, the first is called Who's Young Maylay? Mix Blog and the second is called Young Maylay, WC & Bad Lucc Mix Blog.

Young Maylay is working on three studio albums, by himself, WC and Crazy Toones. Young Maylay is featured on two tracks by Ice Cube called "Y'all Know Who I Am" and "Too West Coast" on his ninth solo studio album I Am the West (2010).

In 2010 Young Maylay was featured on two tracks on the album DJ Premier Presents Year Round Records – Get Used to Us. The track "Temptation" is a solo performance, while the track "Ain't Nuttin' Changed (remix)" is a collaborative effort with Blaq Poet and MC Eiht.

In an interview, when asked about a new studio album, Maylay said:

Yeah, I'm working on an album. But I will not tell the title again! (laughs) And we gonna know when we're gonna drop it. But I got something that I wanna put out. I was gonna call it "Brushfires and Earthquakes", cause that's California all day. On the brushfire side I come with just straight heat spittin'. And then on the earthquake side I'm coming for that like to get out there in traffic and show you they got some sounds. But that's gonna be more or less like a mixtape. The album is in the works. I'm not trying to just take songs that I didn't use off my mixtape and put it on a CD and call it my album. I can't really put no timeline on it, we're working everyday. So it ain't the fact about getting songs done or nothing like that, timing is everything man.

=== OBG Rider Clicc ===
OBG Rider Clicc is Young Maylay's rap trio (with Young Dre The Truth and Killa Polk) the group first appeared on Young Dre's studio album called Revolution in Progress the Movement with the single "Let's Get 5£3 Game Bacc Right". and later appeared with Compton Cavie, Dresta and BG Knocc Out with the song "Wes Indeed" in the Cali Luv mixtape.

== Grand Theft Auto: San Andreas ==
Maylay was working in New York when he received a phone call from DJ Pooh, who was in a meeting with Rockstar Games' staff, including co-founder Dan Houser. They started a regular conversation about music which, unknown to Maylay, occurred on speakerphone. Rockstar staff heard the conversation, and after the conversation between the two ended, they encouraged Pooh to bring Maylay in to audition. A few weeks after the audition, Rockstar reviewed the tapes and decided on Maylay for the role of the main character of Grand Theft Auto: San Andreas, Carl "CJ" Johnson. In a 2026 interview with YouTuber SanInPlay and Brazilian outlet Portal Viciados, Maylay revealed that Pooh intentionally kept the speakerphone a secret so he would act naturally and not force a persona.

During the game's development, Maylay worked closely with Houser, participating in recording sessions that sometimes lasted up to 14 hours. He was also given creative freedom by the studio to modify the script to ensure the Los Angeles street slang was authentic. Furthermore, Maylay clarified a long-standing rumor regarding the character's appearance, confirming that CJ's facial model was not based on his own physical features. He stated that the character's 3D model was already finalized prior to his casting, and he only provided the voice and motion capture.

When asked in 2021 if he would consider reprising the role of CJ in any future Grand Theft Auto titles if given the opportunity, Maylay stated that he would never voice CJ again due to conflicts with Rockstar Games. He accused Rockstar of being "culture vultures" and expressed frustration over their depiction of African American and gang culture, arguing that they were exploiting and profiting from a culture to which they don't belong.

Despite his ongoing feud with Rockstar, Maylay has continued to fully embrace the character of CJ, frequently appearing in public alongside his cousin Shawn Fonteno (Solo), who portrayed Franklin Clinton in Grand Theft Auto V (2013). During a 2024 live stream by internet celebrity Kai Cenat, he indulged viewers by quoting CJ's iconic line, "Ah shit, here we go again." As of 2025, Maylay has also begun attending fan conventions alongside members of the GTA V cast.

== Maylaynium Muziq ==
Maylaynium Muziq is Young Maylay's own independent record label based in Studio City, Los Angeles. His mixtapes were released on this label.

== Discography ==
Mixtapes

- San Andreas: The Original Mixtape (2005)
- The Real Coast Guard (2008)

== Filmography ==
=== Film ===
Year	Title	Role	Notes
2004	The Introduction	Carl "CJ" Johnson	Short film made in the Grand Theft Auto: San Andreas game engine, showcasing the events that occurred prior to the game itself.

=== Television ===
Year	Title	Role	Notes
2014	The Brodies	Mario	Unreleased

=== Video games ===
Year	Title	Role	Notes
2004	Grand Theft Auto: San Andreas	Carl "CJ" Johnson	Voice and motion capture
