= Los Santos (Grand Theft Auto) =

Fictional city in video game

- Grand Theft Auto location
- Los Santos as it appears in Grand Theft Auto V
- First appearance: Grand Theft Auto: San Andreas (2004)
- Last appearance: Grand Theft Auto Online (2013)
- Genre: Action-adventure

In-universe information
- Location: San Andreas, United States

Los Santos is a metropolitan city in the fictional American state of San Andreas (a parody of California) featured in the Grand Theft Auto video game series developed by Rockstar Games. It is a parody of the real-life American city of Los Angeles, California, and features various areas directly inspired by Los Angeles, such as the Vinewood neighborhood being derived from Los Angeles's neighborhood of Hollywood.

Los Santos was introduced in the 2004 game Grand Theft Auto: San Andreas as one of the three principal settings, alongside San Fierro (a parody of San Francisco) and Las Venturas (a parody of Las Vegas). A reimagined version of the city was featured as the primary area and sole urban setting of the 2013 game Grand Theft Auto V and its online counterpart, Grand Theft Auto Online, both of which take place in a different continuity from San Andreas (dubbed the "HD universe"). The Los Santos seen in Grand Theft Auto V and Online resembles Los Angeles much more closely than its San Andreas counterpart, as the developers conducted extensive research on the real city before creating the game world.

Los Santos has been praised by writers of video game journalism for being well-packed in gameplay content across all three games. The HD universe rendition of the city in particular is regarded by critics as one of the best video game settings of all time for its immersive design comparable to real-life cities, and for its closeness to Los Angeles. The city has been credited as a major part of the games' identities and attractiveness to players, with authors arguing that Los Santos evolved into a wackier setting in Grand Theft Auto Online that continued to draw interest from players in ways that other multiplayer game settings failed to do.

== Appearances and development ==
The Grove Street area of Los Santos as it appears in Grand Theft Auto: San Andreas. It also appears in Grand Theft Auto V but plays a much smaller role.

The city of Los Santos is located in the southern part of San Andreas, a fictional American state featured in multiple installments of the Grand Theft Auto game series, developed and published by Rockstar Games. Canonically, the Grand Theft Auto universe is divided into three timelines based on divisions of the series' installments: the 2D universe, 3D universe, and HD universe. Los Santos made its debut in Grand Theft Auto: San Andreas (2004), set within the 3D universe, and later appeared in Grand Theft Auto V (2013), taking place in the HD universe. In Grand Theft Auto: San Andreas, Los Santos is depicted as the hometown of protagonist Carl "CJ" Johnson, who prior to the game's events resided in Liberty City. It is one of the three primary settings visited by the player during the story (alongside San Fierro and Las Venturas) and contains the Ganton neighborhood, which serves as the home base of the Grove Street Families, a street gang that CJ is aligned with. Other areas of Los Santos featured in the game include the affluent neighborhood of Vinewood, the Downtown area that serves as the city's financial center, the Brown Streak Railroad, and the freeway for trips to other cities.

Los Santos is the main setting for Michael De Santa, Trevor Philips, and Franklin Clinton, the three protagonists of Grand Theft Auto V. Similarly to its counterpart in Grand Theft Auto: San Andreas, the city is located in the state of San Andreas, though unlike its previous rendition, it is the only major urban area that can be explored by players. The city also appears in Grand Theft Auto Online, the online component of Grand Theft Auto V. The HD universe rendition of Los Santos features areas prominent in the 3D universe like Vinewood and Grove Street, although the latter plays only a minor role in Grand Theft Auto V compared to San Andreas. In Grand Theft Auto V, like in the 3D universe, the Downtown area serves as Los Santos' financial center and is reflected by skylines like the Maze Bank Tower and the Federal Investigation Bureau (FIB) building. Other prominent areas include Little Seoul (a Koreatown-type area), South Los Santos (made up of lower-class neighborhoods), East Los Santos (a Latino cultural area), Vespucci Beach, and Rockford Hills. To the north of Los Santos is a predominantly rural area called Blaine County, which makes up the rest of the game's map. The world of Grand Theft Auto V is 49 square miles total, with Los Santos itself occupying about 29.28 square miles, or 75.84 square kilometers.

=== Development ===
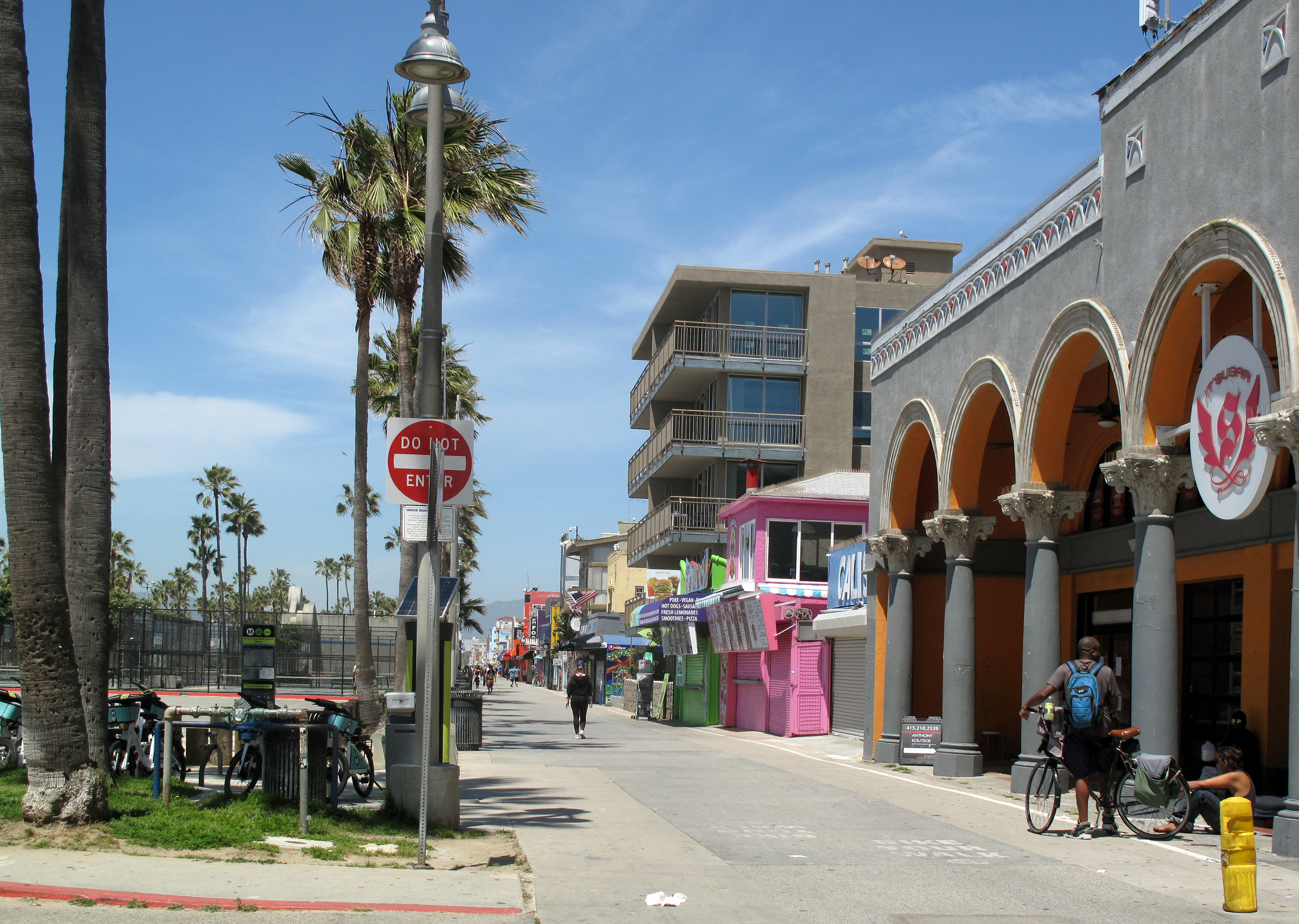
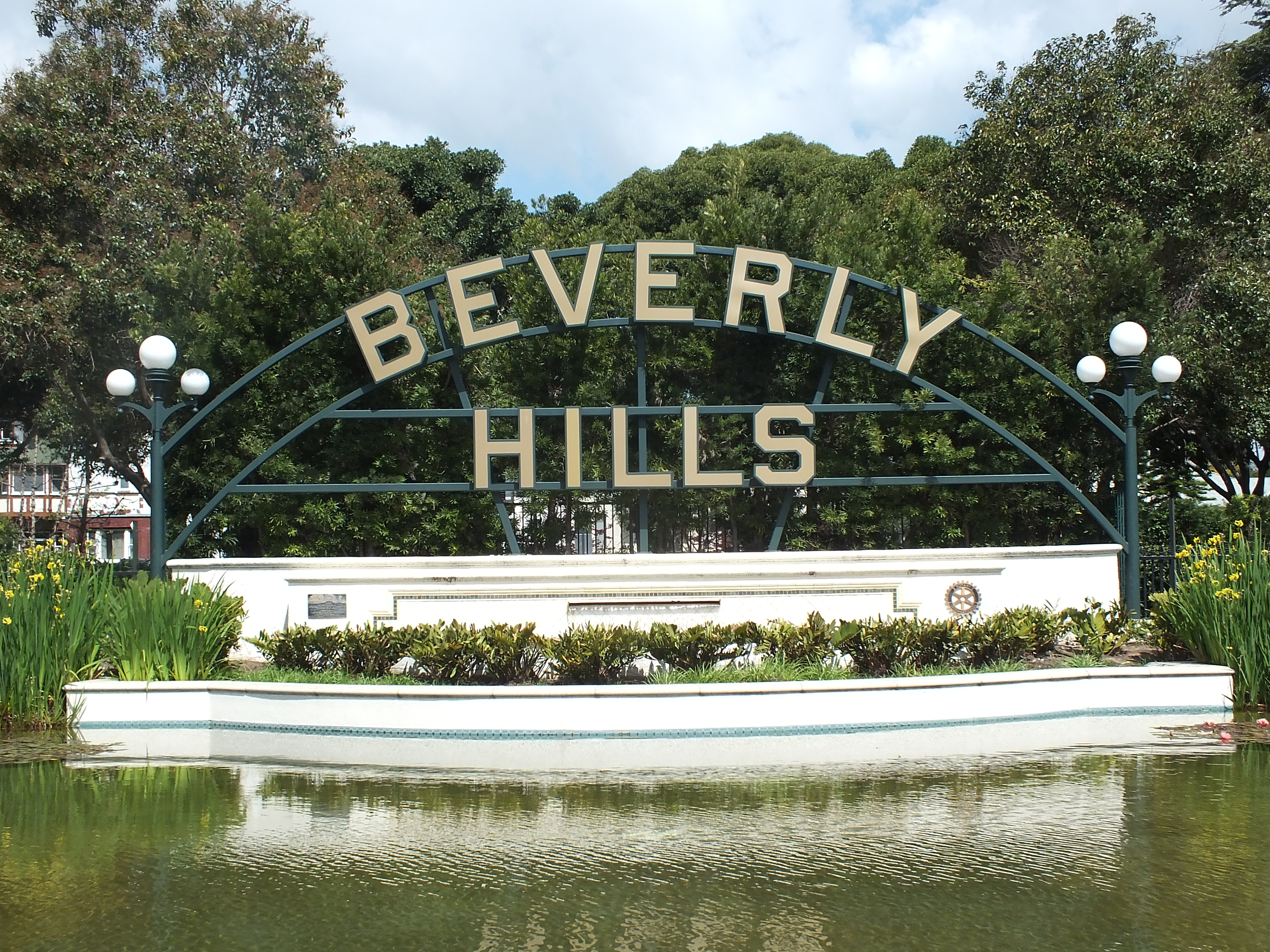
Los Santos's various areas are based on both features from Los Angeles like Hollywood (left) and Venice Beach (center), and other Californian locations like the city of Beverly Hills (right).

In the Grand Theft Auto series, Los Santos is based directly on the populous city of Los Angeles in the American state of California. Likewise, various areas of Los Santos are based on real-life counterparts in Los Angeles. For instance, Vinewood is based on the real-life Los Angeles neighborhood of Hollywood (the Vinewood sign being directly based on the Hollywood Sign); Rockford Hill is derived from another Californian city of Beverly Hills; and Vespucci Beach is a combination of the Californian city of Santa Monica and Venice Beach at Los Angeles. While not identical to Los Angeles's elements, the various features of Los Santos appear to be "compressed interpretation[s]" of iconic locations within the real-life Californian city. Some examples within Grand Theft Auto V include the Richman Hotel and the real-life counterpart hotel called the Beverly Hilton; the Del Perro Pier being based on the Santa Monica Pier; the Big Creek Bridge being a copy of the Bixby Bridge; the Galileo Observatory being modeled after the Griffith Observatory; the Vinewood Bowl and its real-life counterpart of the Hollywood Bowl; the Oriental Theater being based on Grauman's Chinese Theatre; and the Jefferson Towers being derived from the Watts Towers. Los Santos means "The Saints" in Spanish and is a play on the name "Los Angeles", itself meaning "The Angels" in Spanish.

To develop Los Santos as based on Los Angeles in Grand Theft Auto V, the Rockstar Games development team spent more than a hundred days in the Californian city to conduct research, taking hours of digital recordings and thousands of photos there to derive Los Santos from them. Grand Theft Auto series writer Dan Houser mentioned that Rockstar no longer drew inspiration from movies but instead focused deeply on Los Angeles as the game's geographical inspiration. In one interview, he shared his thoughts on Los Angeles feeling "as fake as a game world" and like "lunacy" because of how much its structural contents had deeply altered natural elements that he thought should have prevented the city's existence. Therefore, he argued, it worked well as a "fascinating" source of inspiration and setting for the game series on the grounds of it being an iconic city of the United States. In a later interview, when asked about his research on Los Angeles, he described it as a self-obsessed city with "20th century" vibes that was nothing like his home city of London in the United Kingdom. Houser continued that Grand Theft Auto as a series focuses on integrating the environment as a game design element rather than merely as a setting for action, and said that it was more about "urban planning than architecture". He stated that the games' artists focused on making the world look believable and be playable as a setting, capturing "the essence of what's really there in a city, but in a far smaller area"; he referenced game design as, for instance, being about compromise, in that the game's map is similar to real-life locations like Los Angeles and New York City but smaller.

== Reception ==
Los Santos has been considered by various game journalists to be one of the best and most iconic locations in the Grand Theft Auto series. Screen Rant reporter Devin Ellis Friend stated his opinion that Los Santos in Grand Theft Auto: San Andreas "feels like a fully realized world that the developers took the time to craft and fill with diversions", many of which he said "hit the mark" for him. Inverse writer Willa Rowe called Los Santos in Grand Theft Auto V "a playground unlike any other" because of how much the game encourages players to bend the world's rules and bring chaos within its online counterpart, Grand Theft Auto Online. The Game Informer staff wrote that Los Santos was "one of the most vibrant and beautiful worlds Rockstar has put together" given the various environments that players can explore, including oceans, deserts, mountains, beaches, the metropolis, and Paleto Bay, which they deemed as having "small town charm". In addition, the staff highlighted, the game's online counterpart allowed players to more deeply interact with the city by allowing them to freely roam around, alone or with other players, and commit crimes small to large. Sam Sweet of The New Yorker referred to Los Santos as a version of Los Angeles but with elements of "cop dramas and heist flicks and music videos", also calling it "a love letter to the synthetic Los Angeles of the imagination". Trent Wolbe, writing for The Verge, expressed interest at the light render in Grand Theft Auto V from having driven around the city in-game, noting the sunlight's reflection at Vinewood Hill's infinity pool and skyscrapers to the point of his girlfriend joking with him about whether they were in real-life Los Angeles or in the video game city. The Guardian journalist Keith Stuart praised the role of Los Santos in Grand Theft Auto Online as a "weird, thrilling, hilarious and also frustrating experience", comparing the in-game violence to "Hollywood regurgitating its next ten action blockbusters onto your screen" and calling the area a "city of risk and reward".

In a one-year retrospective review of the game, Eurogamer writer Simon Parkin argued that Grand Theft Auto V as a discussion topic was inseparable from Los Santos, and suggested that the title should have reflected its prominence. He continued that Los Santos was still "the best world in a game, an eager tribute to Los Angeles that blends the real and imagined". Noting that cities have been considered to have personalities to an extent, he determined that Los Santos can be a city of "peril and sin" or "peace and leisure" depending on where the player chooses to go and what they want from the location, and it is a "city of invention and reinvention" like Los Angeles because of the wide options made available to the player. The staff of the game magazine Edge, remarking that Los Angeles is an ideal setting for the Grand Theft Auto universe, called Los Santos the "focal point" for the series' drama of human elements that caught their attention. They considered it to be very similar to Los Angeles as reflected by the deep research on the Californian city by the game development team, labeling it as "the Los Angeles of dreams, even if, in narrative terms, they are often nightmares". Phil Savage of PC Gamer called the fictional location "the finest realisation of a city in gaming" because of the vibes he felt driving and walking around the city, which he said was comparable to doing so in real-life cities at night. Furthermore, he elaborated, his perspective was enhanced from playing the game in a first-person view, making the city appear very extensive in perspective and the player character a tiny piece of it. Screen Rant writer Thomas McNulty was more critical of Los Santos in Grand Theft Auto V, commenting that it was enormous but had content that was more spread out to him as a result. He preferred the city in Grand Theft Auto: San Andreas because it was smaller but had its quests more tightly packed there.

Matthew Ponsford of Wired recorded the perspectives on Los Santos in Grand Theft Auto Online from multiple players and argued that Los Santos, seven years on from 2013 to 2020, had drastically shifted from a single-player setting for committing crimes to one where up to 30 players could interact with their environment creatively. He referred to Los Santos by his article publication as "a bizarre experience" because the area was originally intended for "gritty realism" but eventually became "a time capsule from mid-Obama-era America" as well as a "strange sci-fi mess". One of the players elaborated that Los Santos was "gamified" from a realistic counterpart of Los Angeles into a more chaotic setting where flying vehicles and tanks and "James Bond villain bunkers" with government technology and secret weapons programs were everywhere. Ponsford said that why Los Santos, unlike other video game settings, felt natural remained difficult to answer. GamesRadar+ editor Joe Donnelly wrote a ten-year retrospective on the HD universe games set in Los Santos, praising the city as "among the best video game settings of all time" and remarking that it and surrounding locations like Blaine County made for "a pulsing, thriving world, whose AI civilians lived within its bounds as opposed to merely existing".

Ana Luísa Osorio of CBR highlighted Grand Theft Auto Online for its setting capturing "imagination and attention of players", unlike in many other online games. She said that Los Santos was like a "beacon of duality" given the city is a mix of hosting intense and action-packed in-game features like rival factions, missions like heists, and racing, and containing places the player can explore which emphasize both the beautiful natural environments and the rich history and culture surrounding the location itself. As a result, the author wrote, Los Santos is able to cater to different players depending on how they want to interact with the game world. She also praised the NPCs of Los Santos for enhancing the immersion of the game world, the dynamic climate mechanics that drastically change the game's weather and can influence the gameplay, and the differing atmospheric tones depending on the area the player is in. Osorio also highlighted collectibles scattered across the map as narrative devices that encourage players to deeply interact with the world, and other world-building elements like satire and Easter eggs; all of these features, she explained, demonstrated the care behind the game by its developers.
