= I Am the West =

Studio album by Ice Cube
- Released: September 28, 2010
- Recorded: 2009–10
- Genre: West Coast hip hop; gangsta rap
- Length: 49:43
- Label: Lench Mob
- Producer: B.A.M.; Bangladesh; Dae One; DJ Montay; Doughboy; Hallway Productionz; JIGG; John Murphy; Rocko; Sir Jinx; Tha Bizness; The Fliptones; T-Mix; Track Bully

Ice Cube chronology
Raw Footage (2008)	I Am the West (2010)	Everythang's Corrupt (2018)

Singles from I Am the West
- 1. "I Rep That West" Released: April 25, 2010; 2. "Drink the Kool-Aid" Released: July 27, 2010; 3. "She Couldn't Make It on Her Own" Released: August 31, 2010; 4. "Too West Coast" Released: September 1, 2010

I Am the West is the ninth solo studio album by American rapper Ice Cube. It was released on September 28, 2010 through Lench Mob Records, marking his third independent release following 2006's Laugh Now, Cry Later.

The album was produced by DJ Montay, Hallway Productionz, JIGG, T-Mix, B.A.M., Bangladesh, Dae One, Doughboy, John Murphy, Rocko, Sir Jinx, Tha Bizness, The Fliptones and Track Bully. It features guest appearances from WC, Doughboy, OMG, Young Maylay and Jayo Felony.

In the United States, the album debuted at number 22 on the Billboard 200, number 7 on the Top R&B/Hip-Hop Albums, number 6 on the Top Rap Albums and number 3 on the Independent Albums charts with 22,000 copies sold in its first week.

== Background ==
Ice Cube said this album would be different from any one of his others, having a different direction. The album was released independently under his label Lench Mob. Ice Cube stated that "being independent is beautiful because we can do things 'out the box' that record companies would usually frown at. Instead of working from a ready-made cookie-cutter marketing plan, we can tailor make a marketing plan specifically for me".

In an interview with Baller Status, Ice Cube spoke on two songs that were going to be on the album, "Man vs. Machine" and "Hood Robbin". "'Man vs. Machine' is talking about our obsessions with machinery and how it's taking over. Automation is taking over human beings in all our relevancy in this world. Pretty soon, machines are gonna take over and that's just real...['Hood Robbin'] is talking about how big corporations is now stealing from the poor and giving to the rich. It's a whole thing about the things we're going up against with housing and medical insurance ... just everything people are going through. Real shit that ain't got nothing to do with money, cars, and all the shit most rappers talk about."

Young Maylay made guest appearances on the album. Ice Cube confirmed that Dr. Dre would no longer be on the album in August. He received beats from West coast veteran producers such as DJ Quik, Dr. Dre, E-A-Ski, and Sir Jinx, not having worked on a solo album with the latter in nearly 20 years.

I Am The West, like several previous Ice Cube/Westside Connection albums, features interludes by Keith David.

== Singles ==
The album's lead single "I Rep That West", was released on April 25, 2010. The album's second single "Drink the Kool-Aid", was released on July 27, 2010. The album's third single "She Couldn't Make It On Her Own" featuring Doughboy and OMG, was released on August 31, 2010. A music video for "Too West Coast" (produced by Hallway Productionz) was released on October 5, 2010.

== Critical reception ==
Professional ratings
Aggregate scores
Source	Rating
Metacritic	62/100
Review scores
Source	Rating
AllMusic	4/5 stars
HipHopDX	2.5/5
Los Angeles Times	2.5/4 stars
Pitchfork	4.4/10
RapReviews	7.5/10
Rolling Stone	2.5/5 stars
Slant	2.5/5 stars

I Am the West was met with generally favourable reviews from music critics. At Metacritic, which assigns a normalized rating out of 100 to reviews from mainstream publications, the album received an average score of 62 based on eight reviews.

AllMusic's David Jeffries praised the album, writing "most won't have the skills to follow his playbook, either on or off the field, but Cube's utterly unique I Am the West shows the younger generation how to cross 40 while retaining their freedom and baller status". Steve 'Flash' Juon of RapReviews wrote: "on the tracks of I Am the West that work the best, he's still got the vintage gruff demeanor, lyrical ferocity and hard hitting beats to claim some significant ownership of the Pacific shoreline. At other times he desperately desires to have a contemporary sound, and that's where things fall apart, but those mistakes can be overlooked or easily skipped compared to the quality of the overall presentation". Jeff Weiss of Los Angeles Times stated: "on his ninth album, the independently released I Am the West, he retreats to self-satisfied taunts about his legendary status, the enervated state of the Left Coast, and his rivals, both real and imaginary".

In mixed reviews, Jon Dolan of Rolling Stone found Ice Cube's "rants get boring over track after track of bland Nineties G-funk (a promised collaboration with his estranged N.W.A homey Dr. Dre never came through)". Huw Jones of Slant concluded: "judging by moments like these, when Cube's performance is allowed to take center stage, I Am the West becomes an engaging hip-hop record". Ian Cohen of Pitchfork resumed: "so even if I Am the West is little more than another reminder of what Cube's day job was before becoming a Hollywood supermogul, if it does result in someone's hearing AmeriKKKa's Most Wanted or Death Certificate for the first time in 2010, it's done its job".

== Track listing ==
No.	Title	Lyrics	Music	Length
1.	"A Boy Was Conceived" (Intro)		John Murphy	0:26
2.	"Soul on Ice"	O'Shea Jackson	Chris Whitacre; Justin Henderson	3:39
3.	"Life in California" (featuring Jayo Felony and WC)	O. Jackson; James Savage; William Calhoun	Dameon Garrett; Anthony Wheaton	4:02
4.	"She Couldn't Make It on Her Own" (featuring OMG and Doughboy)	O. Jackson; O'Shea Jackson Jr.; Darrell Finister II	Shondrae Crawford	2:58
5.	"Urbanian"	O. Jackson	Kevin Harris II	2:25
6.	"Ya'll Know How I Am" (featuring OMG, Doughboy, WC and Young Maylay)	O. Jackson; Jackson Jr.; Finister II; Calhoun; Chris Bellard	Montay Humphrey	2:18
7.	"Too West Coast" (featuring WC and Young Maylay)	O. Jackson; Calhoun; Bellard	Deejan Underdue; Teak Underdue	2:58
8.	"I Rep That West"	O. Jackson	Amir Perry	4:31
9.	"Drink the Kool-Aid"	O. Jackson	Brandon Alexander	3:09
10.	"No Country for Young Men"	O. Jackson	Finister II; R.L. Jackson	4:13
11.	"It Is What It Is"	O. Jackson	Humphrey	3:21
12.	"Hood Robbin'"	O. Jackson	Tristan Jones	3:45
13.	"Your Money or Your Life"	O. Jackson	Jones	3:23
14.	"Nothing Like L.A."	O. Jackson	Chaz Mishan; David Delazyn	3:20
15.	"All Day, Every Day"	O. Jackson	D. Underdue; T. Underdue	2:21
16.	"Fat Cat"	O. Jackson	Perry	2:54
Total length:				49:43

iTunes bonus tracks
No.	Title	Writer(s)	Producer(s)	Length
17.	"Man vs. Machine"	O. Jackson; J. Suecof	Infinity	2:27
18.	"Pros vs. Joes"	O. Jackson; Shon Adams; R. Mandell	E-A-Ski	2:19
Total length:				4:46

Sample credits

- Track 4 contains a sample from "The Message" written by Clifton "Jiggs" Chase, Edward Fletcher, Melvin Glover and Sylvia Robinson and performed by Grandmaster Flash and the Furious Five

== Personnel ==
- O'Shea "Ice Cube" Jackson – lyrics, vocals, executive producer
- William "WC" Calhoun, Jr. – lyrics & vocals (tracks: 3, 6, 7)
- James "Jayo Felony" Savage – lyrics & vocals (track 3)
- Darrell "Doughboy" Finister II – lyrics & vocals (tracks: 4, 6), producer (track 10)
- O'Shea "OMG" Jackson, Jr. – lyrics & vocals (tracks: 4, 6)
- Chris "Young Maylay" Bellard – lyrics & vocals (tracks: 6, 7)
- Keith David – voice
- Mike Epps – voice
- Domino – backing vocals (track 3)
- TigerDaWriter – backing vocals (track 3)
- Amir "Jiggolo" Perry – vocals (track 8), producer (tracks: 8, 16)
- John Murphy – producer (track 1)
- Justin "Henny" Henderson – producer (track 2)
- Christopher John "Dow Jones" Whitacre – producer (track 2)
- Dameon "Dae One" Garrett – producer (track 3)
- Anthony "Sir Jinx" Wheaton – producer (track 3)
- Shondrae "Mr. Bangladesh" Crawford – keyboards & producer (track 4)
- Calvin Ewings – keyboards (track 4)
- Kevin "Track Bully" Harris II – producer (track 5)
- Montay Desmond "DJ Montay" Humphrey – producer (tracks: 6, 11)
- Deejan "Dee" Underdue – producer (tracks: 7, 15)
- Teak "Da Beatsmith" Underdue – producer (tracks: 7, 15)
- Brandon "B.A.M." Hodge – producer (track 9)
- R.L. "Rocko" Jackson – producer (track 10)
- Tristan "T-Mix" Jones – producer (tracks: 12, 13)
- Chaz Mishan – producer (track 14)
- David Delazyn – producer (track 14)
- David "Dizmix" Lopez – recording, mixing
- Mike Bozzi – mastering
- Will Ragland – art direction, design
- Eric Williams – photography

== Charts ==
=== Weekly charts ===
Chart (2010)	Peak position
Australian Albums (ARIA)	67
Australian Urban Albums (ARIA)	7
Canadian Albums (Nielsen SoundScan)	51
French Albums (SNEP)	200
UK Independent Albums (OCC)	24
UK R&B Albums (OCC)	24
US Billboard 200	22
US Independent Albums (Billboard)	3
US Indie Store Album Sales (Billboard)	13
US Top R&B/Hip-Hop Albums (Billboard)	7
US Top Rap Albums (Billboard)	6

=== Year-end charts ===
Chart (2010)	Position
US Top R&B/Hip-Hop Albums (Billboard)	99
