= Steven Ogg =

Canadian actor (born 1973)

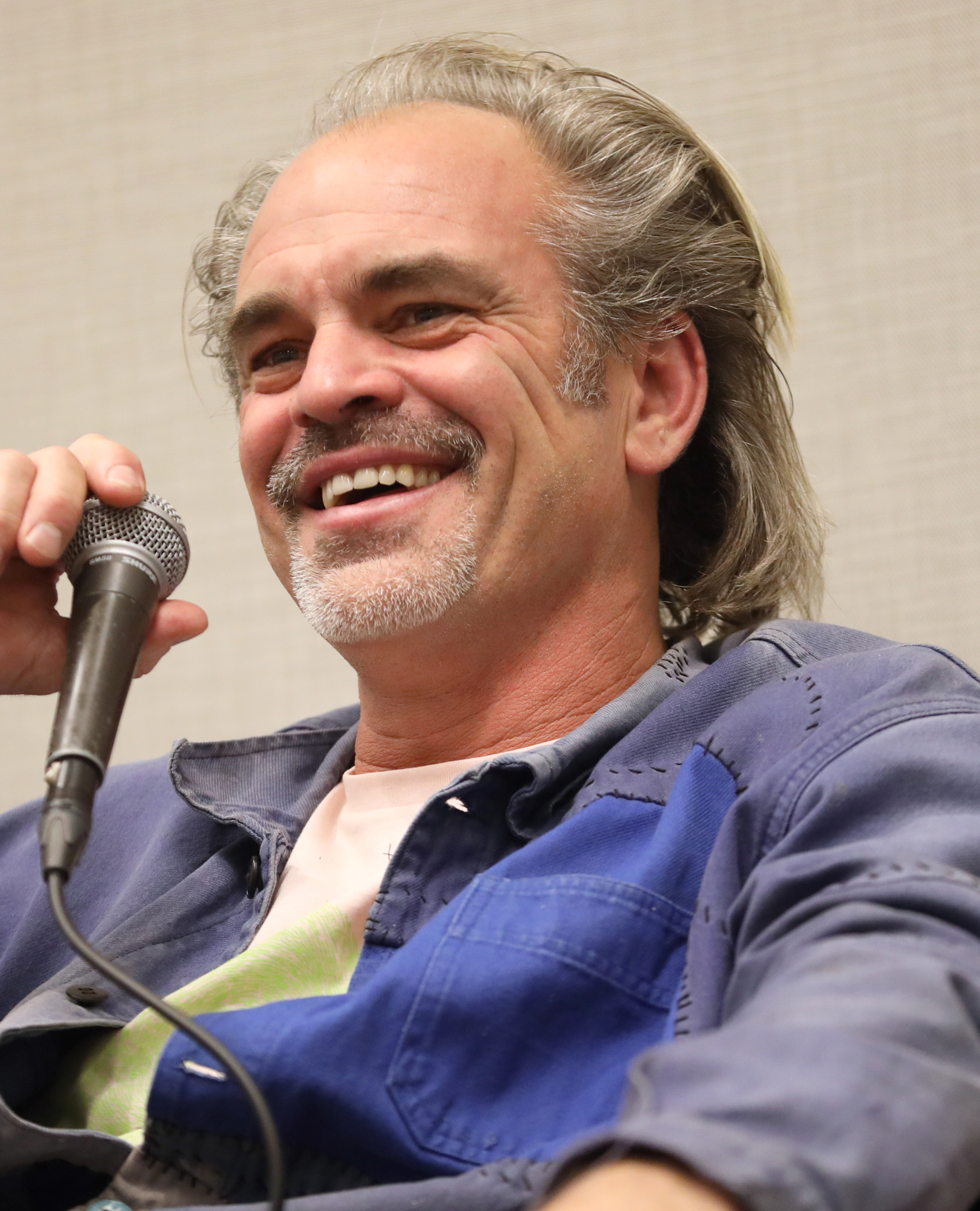
- Ogg at the Phoenix Convention Center in 2024
- Born: Edmonton, Alberta, Canada
- Occupation: Actor
- Years active: 1999–present
- Notable work: Grand Theft Auto V; The Walking Dead
- Children: 1
- Awards: Full list
- Website: oggworld.com

Steven Ogg is a Canadian actor. He is best known for portraying Trevor Philips in the video game Grand Theft Auto V (2013), Simon in The Walking Dead (2016–2018), and as a spokesman for Old Spice.

Born in Edmonton and raised in Calgary, Ogg began his acting career after moving to New York City in 1999. He has since appeared in Law & Order (2000), Better Call Saul (2015–2020), Westworld (2016–2022), Snowpiercer (2020–2022), as well as several independent and short films.

== Early life ==
Steven Ogg was born in Edmonton, Alberta, and raised in Calgary.

== Career ==
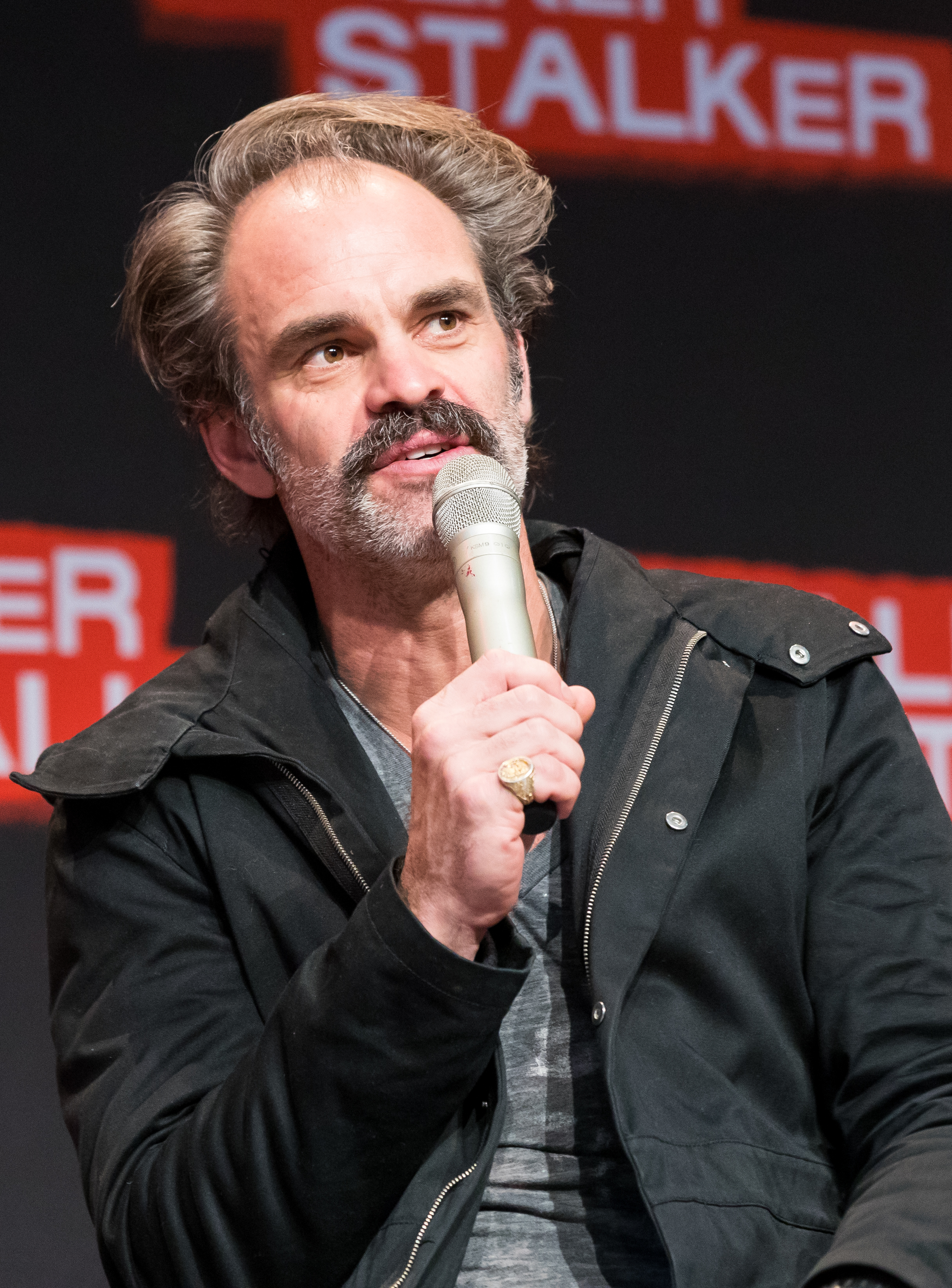
Ogg in March 2018

After moving to New York City, he began acting in television shows such as Law & Order and Third Watch, in addition to some theater work and voice acting. He retired from acting in 2003 but returned in 2008.

After taking a break from acting to build a house, he was hired by Rockstar Games as the voice and motion capture artist for Trevor Philips in their 2013 video game Grand Theft Auto V. His character was critically acclaimed and he received numerous award nominations as a result. In February 2014, he received an award on the 3rd Annual New York Videogame Critics Circle Awards for Best Overall Acting in a Game. Ogg later reprised his role as Trevor Philips in Grand Theft Auto Online in 2013 as a part of the Trevor Philips Industries missions, and in 2015 as a part of the "Series A Funding" heist, and the 2016 YouTube short film GTA VR.

Ogg made two appearances in Better Call Saul as Sobchak, a mercenary and private detective. In the 2015 episode "Pimento", he is one of three bodyguards hired for a protection job before getting into a verbal altercation with Mike Ehrmantraut. Mike humiliates Sobchak by disarming and incapacitating him. He reappeared in the 2020 episode "Dedicado a Max", undertaking clandestine investigative work for Saul Goodman under the pseudonym "Mr X". The name Sobchak was likely inspired by The Big Lebowski character Walter Sobchak, also a security consultant and weapons enthusiast with an inflated sense of his own achievements and abilities.

In The Walking Dead season 6 finale, he made his debut as Simon, a member of the Saviors and one of the main antagonists in season 7 and season 8. Ogg also reprised his role in the spin-off The Walking Dead: Dead City in 2023 for a flashback scene. Ogg also portrayed Rebus in the HBO series Westworld, and provides the voice of Professor Venomous in Cartoon Network's animated series OK K.O.! Let's Be Heroes. In 2019, Ogg portrayed Flexon in the second season of the 2016 series The Tick.

Ogg noted in an interview that he is aware of being typecast as "the crazy guy and the unpredictable guy" (with one example being his portrayal of Trevor in Grand Theft Auto V) though he did not mind this if it led to steady work. He admitted, however, that he would ideally like to explore "different characters [and] different worlds", like his role as a father in the 2019 drama The Short History of the Long Road.

In 2022, he appeared in Dan Mangan's music video for "Fire Escape", playing a personification of Mangan's self-critical inner voice.

In 2024, Ogg appeared in the music video for "U Should Not Be Doing That" by Amyl and the Sniffers.

On February 4, 2025, Ogg publicly addressed rumors that he "hated" his character Trevor Philips from Grand Theft Auto V, during an appearance on fellow actor Michael Rosenbaum's podcast, Inside of You. When asked directly about the rumors, Ogg replied, "No. He's a great character, he's awesome. And, like—still, Shawn [Fonteno] and Ned [Luke], we're friends and we were just doing a Comic Con this past weekend." He went on to explain that he finds it "weird" when fans refer to actors by their character's names, and that he does not understand how people equate him with Trevor, who he describes as "a cartoon."

== Personal life ==
Ogg is a single father and has one son, named Bodhi, who served as the namesake for his character's personal vehicle in Grand Theft Auto V. He currently resides in Pasadena, California.

== Filmography ==
Key
†	Denotes television productions that have not yet been released

=== Film ===
Year	Title	Role	Notes
1999	Giving it Up	Andre the Fashion Photographer	
1999	The Romantic Comedy with an Edge	Donny Don Don	Short; Also producer
2002	Thousand Dollar Shoes	Michel Gilligan	Short
2002	The Lovers	-	Video
2003	Mail Order Bride	Pavel	
2013	Out There	Carl	Short
2013	Disgrace	The Father	Short
2014	Space Dogs	Homicidal Doctor	Video
2014	The Sandman	Biff	Short
2014	Kingdom Come	James	Short
2014	Chapter 7	Dad	Short
2015	He Never Died	Alex	
2015	Blackwell	Walton Briggs	Short
2015	The Escort	Warren	
2015	Moondog Airwaves	Jack	Short
2015	Black Dog, Red Dog	Joe Sr.	
2015	The Book of Ned	Kenny	Short
2016	Rematar	Uley	Short
2017	On The Run	Gwin	Short
2018	Solis	Troy Holloway	Also producer
2018	Patient 001	Head Attendant	
2019	The Present	Mister Russo	Short
2019	The Short History of the Long Road	Clint	
2022	V/H/S/99	The Host	
2022	Emancipation	Sergeant Howard	
2023	Divinity	Restless Ricardo	
2024	Dad Company	Rick	Short
2024	Dark Match	Joe Lean	
2024	Scared Shitless	Don	
2024	All the Lost Ones	Mikael	
2024	O.C.D. (Obsessor Coercio Deus)	The Agent	Short
2024	Hazard	Carl	
2024	The Ghost Trap	James Eugley Sr.	
2024	Frank and 3	Frank	Short
2025	Blind River	Walker Donley	
2025	Sweetness	John	
2025	Concessions	Luke Plimpton	
2025	Appetite	Henry	Short; Also producer
2026	The Dresden Sun	Crilenger	
2026	Unabomber	Dean Kaplan	
2026	Love on Tap	Gunner	
TBA	Ashley Wright	TBA	

=== Television ===
Year	Title	Role	Notes
2000	Law & Order	Mark Vee	Episode: "Untitled"
2001	Third Watch	Shooter	Episode: "A Hero's Rest"
2013	Unforgettable	Larry Yablonski	Episode: "Day of the Jackie"
2013	Person of Interest	Chuck	Episode: "Liberty"
2014	Murdoch Mysteries	Bat Masterson	Episode: "Glory Days"
2014	Broad City	Creepy Locksmith	Episode: "The Lockout"
2015–2020	Better Call Saul	Sobchak	Guest Cast: Season 1 & 5
2016	Rush: Inspired by Battlefield	James Braddock	Main Cast
2016–2018	The Walking Dead	Simon	Guest: Season 6, Recurring Cast: Season 7, Main Cast: Season 8
2016–2022	Westworld	Rebus	Recurring Cast: Season 1, Guest: Season 2 & 4
2017	Stan Against Evil	Werepony	Episode: "Curse of the Werepony"
2017–2019	OK K.O.! Let's Be Heroes	Professor Venomous, Shadowy Figure, Laserblast (voices)	Recurring Cast
2019	The Tick	Flexon	Recurring Cast: Season 2
2020–2022	Snowpiercer	Pike	Recurring Cast: Season 1, Main Cast: Season 2–3
2022	Sprung	Spike	Episode: "Chapter Eight"
2023	The Walking Dead: Dead City	Simon	Episode: "Everybody Wins a Prize"
2023	Boiling Point	Nick	Recurring Cast
2024	It's Florida, Man	Jeff	Episode: "Mermaids"
2025	Revival	Blaine Abel	Recurring Cast

=== Video games ===
Year	Title	Role	Notes
2008	Alone in the Dark	Vinnie	Voice
2009	Cursed Mountain	Alex	Voice and motion capture
2013	Grand Theft Auto V	Trevor Philips	Voice and motion capture
2013, 2015	Grand Theft Auto Online	Trevor Philips	Voice and motion capture; Trevor Philips Industries missions and "Series A Funding" heist

=== Music videos ===
Year	Song	Artist
2022	"Fire Escape"	Dan Mangan
2024	"U Should Not Be Doing That"	Amyl and the Sniffers
2025	"Need"	SPRINTS

=== Commercials ===
Year	Title	Role	Notes	Ref.
2016–17	Old Spice	Bob Giovanni	Dirt Destroyer	
2016–17	Old Spice	Bob Giovanni	Odor Blocker	
2016–17	Old Spice	Bob Giovanni	Hydro Wash	
2022	Old Spice	Bob Giovanni	Men Have Skin, Too	
2024	Asus	Salesman	Republic of Gamers	

=== Audio ===
Year	Title	Role	Notes
2026	Wireland Presents: The Dope Show	Nathaniel Godwynn	Also executive producer

=== Web ===
Year	Title	Role	Notes	Ref.
2016	GTA VR	Trainer	YouTube fan-made short film	

== Awards and nominations ==
Year	Award	Category	Work	Result
2013	Spike Video Game Award	Best Voice Actor	Grand Theft Auto V	Nominated
2013	Code Central Award	Best Male Character	Grand Theft Auto V	Nominated
2014	New York Videogame Critics Circle Award	Best Overall Acting in a Game	Grand Theft Auto V	Won
2014	British Academy Games Award	Performer	Grand Theft Auto V	Nominated
2014	Behind the Voice Actors Award	Best Male Lead Vocal Performance in a Video Game	Grand Theft Auto V	Nominated
2014	Behind the Voice Actors Award	Best Vocal Ensemble in a Video Game	Grand Theft Auto V	Nominated

== Bibliography ==
- Ogg, Steven (2024). Catharse-is: Volume I. Vanguard Press. ISBN 978-1837942770.
