= Trevor Philips =

Fictional character in Grand Theft Auto V

- Grand Theft Auto character
- Trevor Philips in a promotional artwork for Grand Theft Auto V
- First appearance: Grand Theft Auto V (2013)
- Last appearance: Grand Theft Auto Online: Heists (2015)
- Created by: Rockstar North
- Portrayed by: Steven Ogg

Trevor Philips is a character and one of the three playable protagonists, alongside Michael De Santa and Franklin Clinton, of Rockstar North's 2013 video game Grand Theft Auto V. He also appears in the game's multiplayer component, Grand Theft Auto Online. A career criminal and former bank robber, Trevor leads his own organisation, Trevor Philips Enterprises, and comes into conflict with rival gangs and criminal syndicates as he attempts to secure control of the drug and weapons trade in the fictional Blaine County, San Andreas. He is portrayed by Canadian actor Steven Ogg, who provided the voice and motion capture for the character.

Rockstar Games based Trevor's appearance on Ogg's physical appearance, while his personality was inspired by the British criminal Charles Bronson. Grand Theft Auto V co-writer Dan Houser described Trevor as purely driven by desire and resentment. To make players care for the character, the designers gave the character more emotions. Trevor is shown to care about people very close to him, despite his antisocial behavior and psychotic derangement.

The general attention given to Trevor by critics was mostly very positive, although some reviewers felt that his violent personality and actions negatively affected the game's narrative. His design and personality have drawn comparisons to other influential video game and film characters. Many reviewers have called Trevor a likeable and believable character, and felt that he is one of the few protagonists in the Grand Theft Auto series that would willingly execute popular player actions, such as murder and violence.

== Character design ==
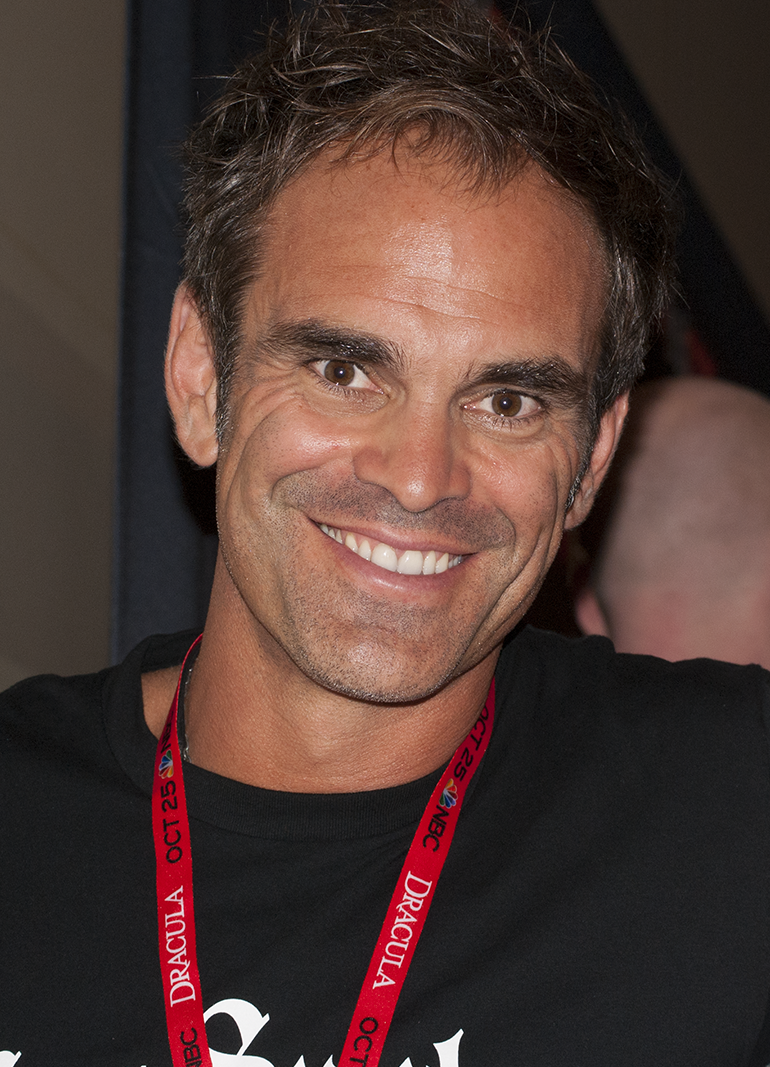
Steven Ogg portrayed Trevor in Grand Theft Auto V. His performance was mostly recorded using motion capture technology.

Grand Theft Auto V co-writer Dan Houser explained that Trevor "appeared to [Rockstar Games] pretty much out of nowhere as the embodiment of another side of criminality [...] If Michael was meant to be the idea of some version of criminal control [...] what about the guy who didn't do that?" He later described Trevor as "the person who's driven purely by desire, resentment, no thought for tomorrow whatsoever, completely id rather than ego-driven." He stated that Trevor "kills without remorse, like a true psychopath, but very sentimental for the right reasons when it suits him."

Rockstar drew upon game protagonist archetypes while scripting the characters; Trevor was considered to embody insanity. Houser said the team characterised Michael and Trevor as juxtapositions of each other. He said, "Michael is like the criminal who wants to compartmentalise and be a good guy some of the time and Trevor is the maniac who isn't a hypocrite". He said that having three lead characters would help move the game's plot into more original territory than its predecessors, which traditionally followed a single protagonist rising through the ranks of a criminal underworld. Steven Ogg was cast as Trevor. During the initial audition process, Ogg noticed an on-set chemistry between him and Ned Luke (who portrayed Michael), which he felt helped secure them the roles. Ogg said, "When [Luke] and I went in the room together we immediately had something". While the actors knew their auditions were for Rockstar Games, it was when they signed contracts that they learned they would be involved in a Grand Theft Auto title.

Ogg felt Trevor's characterisation developed over time. He said, "Nuances and character traits that began to appear—his walk, his manner of speech, his reactions, definitely informed his development throughout the game". Ogg cites Tom Hardy's portrayal of English criminal Charles Bronson in the 2008 biopic Bronson as a strong stylistic influence. He opined that while Trevor embodies the violent, psychopathic Grand Theft Auto anti-hero archetype, he wanted to evoke player sympathy to Trevor's story. "To elicit other emotions was tough, and it was the biggest challenge and it's something that meant a lot to me", Ogg explained. The actors began working on the game in 2010. Their performances were mostly recorded using motion capture technology. Dialogue for scenes with characters seated in vehicles was recorded in studios. Because the actors had their dialogue and movements recorded on-set, they considered their performances were no different from those of film or television roles. Their dialogue was scripted so that it did not allow the actors to ad-lib; however they sometimes made small changes to the performance with approval from the directors.

== Appearances ==
=== Grand Theft Auto V ===
Trevor was born in Canada, just north of the border of the United States. He grew up with a physically abusive father and an emotionally abusive mother. (Note: Grand Theft Auto V, "Mrs. Philips".) He loved planes, and at some point entered the military as a pilot, but was quickly forced to leave after being reproved in a psychological evaluation. (Note: Grand Theft Auto V, "Friends Reunited".) Later on, Trevor committed crimes, the first one being a small robbery that landed him in jail for six months. Due to good behaviour, he was out in four. (Note: Grand Theft Auto V, "The Paleto Score".) He would continue his criminal ways, including using his piloting skills to become a smuggler. Trevor met Michael Townley in 1993, and they realised that they wanted to earn money by performing large heists, so they joined forces and became successful in doing so over the following years. Their partnership began to strain after Michael got married and started a family. Despite this, Trevor grew close to Michael's children, who came to see him as their uncle. (Note: Grand Theft Auto V, "Fame or Shame".)

In 2004, during a heist in Ludendorff, North Yankton, Michael and mutual accomplice Brad Snider are shot by the police while Trevor escapes. (Note: Grand Theft Auto V, "Prologue".) While on the run, Trevor is led to believe that Michael died and Brad was sent to jail. Trevor eventually settles in Sandy Shores, a small town in Blaine County, San Andreas, where he establishes a small criminal enterprise that smuggles weapons and manufactures methamphetamine, which he hopes will grow into a large empire. Due to raging abandonment issues, Trevor surrounds himself with two loyal friends that he kidnapped and brainwashed from their previous lives (Note: Grand Theft Auto V, "Hang Ten".) named Ron Jakowski and Wade Hebert. Trevor enters an uneasy truce with his competitors in Sandy Shores, including the Lost motorcycle club led by Johnny Klebitz, (Note: Grand Theft Auto V, "Mr. Philips".) the Varrios Los Aztecas, (Note: Grand Theft Auto V, "Trevor Philips Industries".) and the O'Neil Brothers. (Note: Grand Theft Auto V, "Crystal Maze".)

In 2013, Trevor finds out that Michael faked his death, and is so spooked and enraged that he breaks the truce and kills most of his competition in one outburst of violence, a deadly streak that continues when a potential game-changing deal with a group of triads falls through. He later drives to Los Santos, taking over the apartment and ruining the life of Wade's cousin Floyd, and reunites with Michael, who took on the surname "De Santa" and claims to be living in witness protection. Though Michael is reluctant to have Trevor back in his life, he introduces him to Franklin Clinton, after which the two perform heists again, this time including Franklin. (Note: Grand Theft Auto V, "The Merryweather Heist".) Trevor is determined to rob anything guarded by Merryweather Security, a private military company he dislikes, (Note: Grand Theft Auto V, "Scouting the Port".) but he often fails. (Note: Grand Theft Auto V, "Minor Turbulence".)

When corrupt Federal Investigation Bureau (FIB) agents Dave Norton and Steve Haines contact Michael after he breaks his agreement with them, they force him to carry out a number of operations with Trevor and Franklin to undermine the International Affairs Agency (IAA). (Note: Grand Theft Auto V, "Three's Company".) Steve later introduces the trio to Devin Weston, (Note: Grand Theft Auto V, "By the Book".) a billionaire investor who hires them to steal several rare and expensive cars, (Note: Grand Theft Auto V, "I Fought the Law...".) but ultimately cheats them out of their money. (Note: Grand Theft Auto V, "Pack Man".) During this time, Trevor begins to bond with Franklin as they carry out several jobs together, some of which involve Franklin's friend Lamar Davis, whom Trevor also befriends. (Note: Grand Theft Auto V, "Hood Safari".) Later, after not getting paid for a job, Trevor kidnaps Patricia, the wife of drug kingpin Martin Madrazo. (Note: Grand Theft Auto V, "Caida Libre".) Due to her kind maternal nature and his own abandonment issues, Trevor falls in love with her and only returns her to Madrazo after much demanding from Michael. (Note: Grand Theft Auto V, "Derailed".) However, the two stay in contact until the end of the game.

Eventually, Trevor begins to suspect that Brad is not in prison and that the Ludendorff heist from nine years prior was a setup, and flies to Ludendorff to confirm his suspicions. Upon finding Brad's body in the grave marked for Michael, he deduces that the latter had made a deal with Dave to help him fake his death and kill Trevor, but Brad was accidentally shot instead. (Note: Grand Theft Auto V, "Bury the Hatchet".) Feeling betrayed, Trevor vows to kill Michael, but later comes to his and Dave's rescue when they are betrayed by Steve, because he needs Michael alive for one last heist. (Note: Grand Theft Auto V, "The Wrap Up".) When that heist is successful, Trevor is so pleased that he lifts the death vow but still hates Michael. (Note: Grand Theft Auto V, "The Big Score".)

Near the end of the game, Franklin is approached separately by Steve and Devin, who order him to kill Trevor and Michael, respectively, although Franklin may instead choose to save both of his mentors at the risk of his own life. (Note: Grand Theft Auto V, "Finale Intro Cutscene".) Should Franklin choose to kill Trevor, he will arrange a meeting that escalates into a high-speed chase when the latter realizes his intentions. As the chase reaches an oil plant, Michael arrives and causes Trevor to crash into an oil tank; with Trevor covered in oil, either Franklin or Michael shoots the oil, setting Trevor alight and killing him. (Note: Grand Theft Auto V, "Something Sensible".) Should Franklin choose to kill Michael, he will do so successfully, but Trevor will resent him for his betrayal and ultimately cut all ties with him, warning Franklin to stay away. (Note: Grand Theft Auto V, "The Time's Come".) Otherwise, the "Deathwish" scenario sees Trevor and Michael putting their differences aside to help Franklin fight a platoon of FIB and Merryweather troops sent after them, before the trio split up to eliminate their remaining enemies. After killing Steve and Devin, Trevor forgives and reconciles with Michael, and the three protagonists cease working together but agree to remain allies. (Note: Grand Theft Auto V, "The Third Way".) In the post-story gameplay, Trevor can continue to hang out with Michael and Franklin, during which he eventually admits that he overreacted after learning the truth about Brad, and refers to himself and Michael as friends.

=== Grand Theft Auto Online ===
Trevor is a main character in Grand Theft Auto Online, the online multiplayer mode of Grand Theft Auto V, set several months before the single-player story. He provides missions to the player after they reach Rank 13 and steal Trevor's rolling meth lab during a job. (Note: Grand Theft Auto Online, "Meth'd Up".) When the player arrives at his trailer, Trevor demands compensation for the stolen meth lab and has them complete several jobs, (Note: Grand Theft Auto Online, "TP Industries".) which generally consist of stealing drugs from rivals, mainly the Lost MC, and killing the dealers. (Note: Grand Theft Auto Online, "Lost My Mind".) Trevor later plays a major role in the 2015 Heists update, where he masterminds one of the heists featured in the update. This "heist" consists of the theft of drugs from various gangs, including the Lost, the O'Neil Brothers, the Los Santos Vagos, and the Ballas, which Trevor plans to sell for a large profit. After all drug shipments are collected, Trevor and the players deliver them to the deal's location, whereupon Trevor gives the players their cut in advance and they leave. When the buyer arrives, Trevor quickly realizes that the deal is a sting operation, at which point he is ambushed by the Drug Observation Agency (DOA) but manages to escape, albeit without the drugs. (Note: Grand Theft Auto Online, Heists, "Series A Funding".)

Trevor makes no further physical appearances in the game but is mentioned by Ron Jakowski in the update Smuggler's Run, which is set in 2017, (Note: Grand Theft Auto Online, Gunrunning, "Mole Hunt": Agent 14: "Yeah, it's 2017. I can't believe it either.") a few years after the events of Grand Theft Auto V. Ron, after being abandoned by Trevor, contacts the player to start their own smuggling operation, and when they meet, the former briefly talks about Trevor, saying he has "gone Vinewood" and has become a "guru" and a "lifestyle coach". (Note: Grand Theft Auto Online, Smuggler's Run: Ron Jakowski: "That bastard Tre... uh, my best friend... He's supposed to protect me forever... then he goes all Vinewood on me... He's too important for Ron now... He's a guru, he's a lifestyle coach.") Furthermore, the 2019 update, The Diamond Casino & Resort, includes a mention of the events of "The Third Way"; this seemingly confirms the "Deathwish" option as the canonical ending of Grand Theft Auto V, meaning both Trevor and Michael are still alive after the events of the single-player story. (Note: Grand Theft Auto Online, The Diamond Casino & Resort, "Casino – Strong Arm Tactics": Tao Cheng: "I almost got killed at this country club once already. Never again.") Trevor is further referenced in the 2020 update, The Cayo Perico Heist, which features a salacious picture of him and Patricia Madrazo, confirming the two did have an affair together; (Note: Grand Theft Auto Online, "The Cayo Perico Heist".) the 2021 update, The Contract, in which he is mentioned as one of several people to try and visit Franklin at his new agency, F. Clinton and Partner; (Note: Grand Theft Auto Online, The Contract: Agency Security Guard: "Hey, this crazy dude swung by earlier, dressed like a hobo. Like really on edge, he swore him and Mr. Clinton used to work together. Got really angry when I said he wasn't available. I had to stop him from shitting on the desk. Seriously. If you get a minute with Mr. Clinton, would you let him know?") and in the 2022 update, Los Santos Drug Wars, when Ron informs the player that Trevor has left Blaine County and most of Trevor Philips Enterprises' assets have been abandoned. (Note: Grand Theft Auto Online, Los Santos Drug Wars: Ron Jakowski: "Yeah, I've been waiting for something like this to happen since Trevor took off. Vultures showing up in Sandy Shores, looking for scraps.")

=== Other appearances ===
Trevor, along with Michael and Franklin, is referenced in Grand Theft Auto VI as part of an in-game true crime podcast. During the podcast, it is revealed that Wade Hebert was charged with the double homicide of his cousin Floyd and the latter's fiancée Debra—actually committed by Trevor—and sentenced to 50 years in a maximum security penitentiary. While being interviewed by investigators, Wade was shown a picture of Trevor, Michael, and Franklin and recognized the trio, but refused to reveal Trevor's name to the authorities, only referring to him as his "BFF". Wade's insistence that Trevor could not have been responsible for Floyd and Debra's murder leads to speculation that Wade is actually innocent and that Trevor, Michael, and Franklin were part of a crew that committed various crimes throughout San Andreas in 2013.

== Cultural impact ==
=== Reception ===
Trevor's character was met with generally positive feedback following the release of Grand Theft Auto V. Edge singled out Trevor as the stand-out of the three protagonists, which they attributed to his volatile personality. Like Edge, Caroline Petit of GameSpot considered Trevor "a truly horrible, terrifying, psychotic human being—and a terrific character." Eurogamer's Tom Bramwell, however, felt that Trevor undermined the other characters because he was a "shallow and unconvincing" sensationalised anti-hero, and that "his antics derail[ed] the narrative" and overshadowed the character development of Michael and Franklin. Xav de Matos of Joystiq found all three characters unlikable to the extent that they had an alienating effect on the story, noting that "though each character has a valid motivation for his journey, it's difficult to want them to succeed." He also felt that the ambivalence between Trevor and Michael was a tired device by the conclusion of the story as it became a "seemingly endless cycle" of conflict between them.

Lucas Sullivan of GamesRadar praised Trevor for being the first character in the series that "makes sense", stating that Trevor is one of the few protagonists in Grand Theft Auto that would willingly execute popular player actions, such as murder and violence. Andy Corrigan of IGN compared Trevor to Heath Ledger's Joker in the 2008 film The Dark Knight. Corrigan felt that Trevor is the only character in Grand Theft Auto V not trying to fake his persona, stating "Trevor absolutely knows that he's a monster but just doesn't care. He enjoys causing misery and harm, lives for it and embraces it and – much like Heath Ledger's Joker – he exists purely for unadulterated anarchy". Screen Rant's Devin Ellis Friend criticised the character as "a step too far", deeming him unlikable and more suited to an antagonist role.

Trevor was named Best Character for the Official Xbox Magazine's Game of the Year Awards 2013. The character was nominated for Character of the Year at VGX, Best New Character from Hardcore Gamer, Best Character from Destructoid, and Outstanding Achievement in Character at the 17th Annual D.I.C.E. Awards. Steven Ogg was also nominated for his work as Trevor from VGX, The Telegraph, and the 10th British Academy Video Games Awards.

=== Controversies ===
The mission "By the Book" from Grand Theft Auto V was criticised for its depiction of torture. In the mission, Trevor interrogates Ferdinand "Mr. K" Kerimov for information about Tahir Javan, a suspected Azerbaijani fugitive who poses a threat to the FIB (the game's version of the FBI). Trevor uses torture equipment on the restrained man, which players select from a table. Once Mr. K provides the FIB with the information, Trevor is asked to kill him, but instead drives him to the airport, providing him an opportunity to escape. While driving Kerimov, Trevor monologues about the ineffectiveness of torture, pointing out Kerimov's readiness to supply the FIB with the information without being tortured, and expressing that torture is used as a power play "to assert ourselves". (Note: Grand Theft Auto V, "By the Book": Trevor: "The media and the government would have us believe that torture is some necessary thing. We need it to get information, to assert ourselves. Did we get any information out of you?" / Kerimov: "I would have told you everything." / Trevor: "Exactly. Torture's for the torturer. Or the guy giving the orders to the torturer. You torture for the good times – we should admit that. It's useless as a means of getting information!")

Reviewers echoed that while the mission served as political commentary on the use of torture by the United States government, its use of torture was in poor taste. GameSpot's Petit felt that placing the torture scene in context with the monologue created a hypocrisy in the mission's function as a commentary device, and IGN's Keza MacDonald felt it "pushed the boundaries of taste". In an editorial, Bramwell discussed whether the political commentary was overshadowed by the violent content, comparing the mission to Call of Duty: Modern Warfare 2's "No Russian" controversy. He considered the sequence lacking enough context to justify its violence and summarised its function as "flawed". Labour MP Keith Vaz expressed concern that underage players could be exposed to the mission. Keith Best of Freedom from Torture said the torturer role-play "crossed a line". Tom Chick defended the torture sequence, and wrote that unlike the "No Russian" mission or the 2012 film Zero Dark Thirty, the underlying political commentary on torture in "By the Book" necessitated the violent content.
