= Grand Theft Auto Online =

2013 video game

- Developer: Rockstar North
- Publisher: Rockstar Games
- Director: Leslie Benzies
- Producer: Andy Duthie
- Designer: Leslie Benzies
- Programmers: Adam Fowler; Daniel Yelland; Robert Trickey
- Artist: Aaron Garbut
- Series: Grand Theft Auto
- Engine: RAGE
- Platforms: PlayStation 3; Xbox 360; PlayStation 4; Xbox One; Windows; PlayStation 5; Xbox Series X/S
- Release: 1 October 2013: PS3, Xbox 360; 1 October 2013; PS4, Xbox One; 18 November 2014; Windows; 14 April 2015; PS5, Xbox Series X/S; 15 March 2022
- Genre: Action-adventure
- Mode: Multiplayer

Grand Theft Auto Online is an online multiplayer action-adventure game developed by Rockstar North and published by Rockstar Games. It was released on 1 October 2013 for the PlayStation 3 and Xbox 360, (Note: The game was discontinued on PlayStation 3 and Xbox 360 on 16 December 2021.) 18 November 2014 for the PlayStation 4 and Xbox One, 14 April 2015 for Windows, and 15 March 2022 for the PlayStation 5 and Xbox Series X/S. The game is the online component of Grand Theft Auto V. Set within the fictional state of San Andreas (based on Southern California), Grand Theft Auto Online allows up to 30 players (Note: The PlayStation 3 and Xbox 360 versions of Grand Theft Auto Online allowed up to 16 concurrent players, while the PlayStation 4, Xbox One, and PC versions allow up to 30 concurrent players.) to explore its open world environment and engage in cooperative or competitive game modes.

The open-world design lets players freely roam San Andreas, which includes an open countryside and the fictional city of Los Santos (based on Los Angeles). Players control a customisable silent protagonist in their journey to become a powerful criminal, slowly building an empire as they complete tasks from various non-playable characters, many of them returning from the single-player mode. Set both months before and years after the single-player campaign, (Note: While the game was initially set prior to the events of Grand Theft Auto V, the narrative of later updates, starting with 2017's Gunrunning, takes place in their respective years of release.) Grand Theft Auto Online comprises cooperative missions where multiple players complete tasks to advance the narrative. The game also features numerous side activities and events, including the more elaborate "Heists", and various businesses that players can purchase and manage.

Developed in tandem with the single-player mode, Grand Theft Auto Online was conceived as a separate experience to be played in a continually evolving world. At launch, it suffered widespread technical issues resulting in the inability to play missions and loss of character data. It initially polarised reviewers, being criticised for its lack of direction and repetitive missions, with praise particularly directed at the scope and open-ended gameplay. It won divided year-end accolades, ranging from Biggest Disappointment to Best Multiplayer, from several gaming publications. The game receives frequent free updates that further expand on the game modes and content, which has improved critical reception. The 2015 Heists update was especially well received by critics.

== Gameplay ==
Developed in tandem with Grand Theft Auto V, Grand Theft Auto Online was conceived as a separate experience to be played in a continually evolving world. Up to 30 players freely roam across the same open world environment as the single-player game and enter lobbies to complete jobs (story-driven competitive or cooperative modes). The Content Creator toolset lets players create their own parameters for custom jobs, like racetracks and deathmatch weapon spawn points. Players may band together in organised player teams called crews to complete jobs together. The Rockstar Games Social Club extends crews formed in Max Payne 3's multiplayer mode to Grand Theft Auto Online. Players can create their own crews and join up to five total. Crews also have a hierarchy; crew leaders can change a member's role in said hierarchy. Crews win multiplayer matches to earn experience points and climb online leaderboards.

In Grand Theft Auto Online, players create a new character specific to the online world, which shows on the screen's Switch Wheel alongside single-player characters Franklin, Michael, and Trevor. The player-characters are designed by a genetics-related process. Greater control is given to the character's clothes and hairstyles. The protagonist arrives in Los Santos by plane and is picked up by Lamar Davis, who gives the character a gun and a car. An hour-long tutorial introduces the player to the various game modes, driving, fighting, and game progression mechanics. The story is not central in the multiplayer, though it initially served as a prequel to Grand Theft Auto V, where characters from the single-player mode are woven in.

Similar to the single-player campaign, players can level up their character's attributes such as their driving skill, weapon accuracy, physical strength and stamina. Exclusive to Grand Theft Auto Online is a system of earning experience, usually by successful completion of activities. Accumulating enough experience to level up unlocks weapons, clothing, car customisations, and more advanced activities (such as parachuting and aircraft). Once unlocked, items need to be purchased with in-game currency, which can be earned or purchased with real money. Players can circumvent an activity's level requirements by joining a game with others of a sufficient rank. There are options to play alone or with friends, and an option for "Passive Mode", which makes the player immune to other players' attacks.

Aside from the open world, there are three main types of set activities: racing (by car, bike, aircraft, or boat), Deathmatches (team or free-for-all), and Contact Missions (linear jobs with set objectives, usually cooperative). The game uses lock-on aim and emphasises stealth in firefights. "Adversary Mode" adds several asymmetric variations on these activities, including "Siege Mentality" where one team is besieged by another, and "Hasta La Vista" where truckers chase down cyclists (reminiscent of the truck/motorcycle chase in Terminator 2: Judgment Day). "Survival" pits a team of up to four players against ten waves of enemies. The Heists update released in March 2015 added five elaborate multi-part missions, where teams of four players must complete several "prep jobs" in the lead-up to a major crime; each heist finale is a high-paying job, and the profits must be split between all participating players. Subsequent heists added to the game removed the four-player requirement and can instead be completed solo or by teams of two, three, or four players. The player who is the Heist Leader must pay the upfront costs for unlocking each heist, and is the only one required to complete all prep jobs in order; other players can join any setup/finale jobs without prerequisite and get paid a cut for each mission passed. The heists requiring multiple players often assign specific roles such as driver, gunner, hacker etc. and/or may split the team apart, making communication between players crucial.

The game includes a content creation tool that lets players make automobile races and deathmatches. Players can choose the location, start and spawn points, and weapon and vehicle drops in deathmatches, and the location, route, race type, and player count in air, land, or sea races. Creations have to be tested against computer-controlled players before the mode is available online. The creations can also be published for others to use. Rockstar tags what they deem to be the best as "Rockstar Verified". In December 2025, the content creation tool was expanded with the addition of the Rockstar Mission Creator, which allows players to create linear jobs akin to Contact Missions; players may choose the location and objective of the mission, the available items, and add non-player characters and cutscenes.

The game is updated on a regular basis to provide new content to players in the form of special challenges and events, Adversary Modes, and discounts on select vehicles, weapons, and properties. Certain benefits are exclusive to members of GTA+, Rockstar's subscription service introduced in March 2022. Unique updates are released during certain times of year, such as the map being covered in snow during the holiday season.

== Plot ==
The game's narrative begins in 2013, several months before Grand Theft Auto V. Players take on the role of a silent protagonist who moves to Los Santos in search of new pursuits. Upon arrival, they meet with Lamar Davis (Slink Johnson), whom they befriended on the social networking site Lifeinvader. After a street race against the player, Lamar introduces them to drug dealer Gerald (Douglas Powell Ward) and corrupt car salesman Simeon Yetarian (Demosthenes Chrysan) for work. As the player slowly builds up their reputation, they attract the attention of individuals like illicit business proprietor Trevor Philips (Steven Ogg), hacker Lester Crest (Jay Klaitz), and drug lord Martin Madrazo (Alfredo Huereca), who also employ them.

Eventually, the player is offered bigger job opportunities by Lester, who recruits them for several bank robberies; a shady government agent known only as Agent 14 (Ryan Farrell), who has them break a convicted spy out of prison and raid a government-run lab; and Trevor, who enlists their help with a highly lucrative drug deal. (Note: As depicted in the Heists update) Lamar also hires the player to sabotage several rival gangs to set the stage for his eventual rise to power, but this backfires, causing a falling out with his own gang. The player helps Lamar regain their trust. (Note: As depicted in the Lowriders update) During this time, the player slowly builds up their own criminal empire, starting with an initially small organisation, (Note: As depicted in the Executives and Other Criminals update) which expands with the purchase of an office and several warehouses to aid the player in the theft and sale of various goods. (Note: As depicted in the Further Adventures in Finance and Felony and Import/Export updates) The player also starts a motorcycle club and begins running additional illicit businesses. (Note: As depicted in the Bikers update)

In 2017, the player continues to expand their empire by starting gunrunning and smuggling operations alongside Agent 14 (Note: As depicted in the Gunrunning update) and Trevor's former associate Ron Jakowski (David Mogentale), respectively. (Note: As depicted in the Smuggler's Run update) Later, Lester introduces the player to billionaire Avon Hertz (Sean McGrath) and his AI network Cliffford, who recruit them to help prevent a potential foreign attack on the United States. During their mission, the group collaborates with the International Affairs Agency (IAA), (Note: The IAA is a fictionalized parody of the Central Intelligence Agency (CIA).) including Agent 14, and clashes with a rogue Russian special ops unit led by Bogdan (Vyto Ruginis). However, after eliminating the unit, Avon and Cliffford turn on the group and reveal their true intentions to trigger a nuclear armageddon, having already gained access to the state's defense grid. The player thwarts this plot by raiding a missile base hidden within Mount Chiliad, destroying trucks with Cliffford's code to stop a missile launch, and killing Avon as he tries to escape. (Note: As depicted in The Doomsday Heist update)

In 2018, the player opens a new nightclub alongside former Liberty City nightclub entrepreneur "Gay" Tony Prince (David Kenner), and begins using it as a front for their illicit businesses. (Note: As depicted in the After Hours update) They also become a top competitor in Arena War, a popular demolition derby-like TV series. (Note: As depicted in the Arena War update) The following year, the player becomes a VIP member at the newly opened Diamond Casino & Resort owned by Tao Cheng (Richard Hsu), member of a Hong Kong-based crime family. The player assists the staff with the various problems they are facing, primarily involving a hostile takeover attempt by Texan businessman Avery Duggan, whom they eventually kill. However, this allows Duggan's nephew Thornton to buy the casino while Tao returns to China. (Note: As depicted in the Diamond Casino & Resort update) Later, Tao's sister Georgina (Christina Liang) hires the player and a retired Lester to rob the casino as payback against the Duggans. The heist is carried out successfully, humiliating Thornton, and Lester begins a relationship with Georgina. (Note: As depicted in The Diamond Casino Heist update)

In 2020, the player conducts several new jobs for Gerald, taking out rival drug dealers and gang bosses. (Note: As depicted in Gerald's Last Play) They also enter a short-lived conflict with the Kkangpae after the latter raid their superyacht, which ends with the player killing the gang's leader. (Note: As depicted in the Los Santos Summer Special update) Afterwards, the player is hired by Martin Madrazo's son Miguel (Robbie Gottlieb) to steal incriminating files from Juan "El Rubio" Strickler (Joseph Melendez), the world's most notorious drug dealer and primary supplier to the Madrazo Cartel, who has threatened to report them to the DEA if they do not renegotiate their prices. With the help of their recently purchased nuclear submarine and its one-man crew, former Russian Navy sailor Pavel (Brandon Beilis), the player plans and executes a successful robbery of El Rubio's compound on his private Caribbean island, Cayo Perico. (Note: As depicted in The Cayo Perico Heist update)

In 2021, the player becomes a member of the LS Car Meet, an underground hub for car enthusiasts and street racers. There, they are introduced to Kenny "KDJ" Dixon Jr. and Sessanta (Emana Rachelle), who provide them with several robbery contracts. (Note: As depicted in the Los Santos Tuners update) Lamar later introduces the player to his friend Franklin Clinton (Shawn Fonteno), who hires them as a partner at his newly opened celebrity solutions agency. The agency's first major client, Dr. Dre, enlists their help to recover his stolen phone containing unreleased music tracks. The player tracks down the thief, Johnny Guns, a rival records producer, and recovers the music. After saving Dre from Guns' hitmen and aiding him in exacting revenge, he rewards the player by letting them be the first person to hear his newest song. Meanwhile, Lamar, upset at being left out of Franklin's new dealings, starts his own cannabis business, LD Organics. Franklin and Lamar then attempt to diversify it by connecting with a client involved in the Epsilon Program religious cult. (Note: The Epsilon Program is a fictionalized parody of the Church of Scientology.) Although the client ultimately betrays them, the pair's stunts draw widespread media attention, which Lamar takes advantage of to promote his business. (Note: As depicted in The Contract update)

In 2022, the player is contacted by Agent ULP (Jeff Steitzer) of the IAA and sworn in as an agent so they may investigate the recent spike of gas prices in the state. Through their investigation, the player discovers that the Duggans have built an AI using backup drives of Cliffford's code bought from the Federal Investigation Bureau (FIB), (Note: The FIB is a fictionalised parody of the Federal Bureau of Investigation (FBI).) which they used to manipulate the prices for their personal profit. After ambushing a deal between Thornton's brother Mason and the FIB, the player recovers the drives and kills Mason, ending the crisis. Agent ULP then sends the player to the Mount Chiliad facility to retrieve the last traces of Cliffford's code and prevent a similar incident in the future, before cutting ties with them. (Note: As depicted in The Criminal Enterprises update) Later, the player is introduced to the Fooliganz, a juggalo troupe led by Dax (Matt Van Orden), who are eager to start a drug distribution ring. The player helps them sabotage rival operations run by The Lost motorcycle club and build up their own, officially joining the troupe. (Note: As depicted in the Los Santos Drug Wars update)

In 2023, the Fooliganz's hangout is attacked by mercenaries who kidnap Dax's "personal physician", Labrat (Courtney Gains), and steal blacklisted precursor chemicals previously acquired by the player. The player discovers Dr. Isiah Friedlander (Bryan Scott Johnson), a renowned therapist-turned-pharmaceutical corporation owner, to be responsible, requiring Labrat's skills to create a new psychedelic drug for therapeutic purposes and make a fortune. The player rescues Labrat and recovers the stolen chemicals, despite Friedlander's escape. (Note: As depicted in The Last Dose) Later, the player joins the Los Santos Angels (LSA) flight squadron and mercenary group to disrupt the operations of rival private military company Merryweather. In the end, their actions result in a significant decrease of Merryweather presence in the state, as well as the termination of their partnership with the U.S. government. (Note: As depicted in the San Andreas Mercenaries update) The player also opens a salvage yard alongside Liberty City real estate developer Yusuf Amir (Omid Djalili) and his cousin Jamal, which they use as a front to plan and execute various vehicle thefts. (Note: As depicted in The Chop Shop update)

In 2024, the player is contacted by Vincent Effenburger (T.L. Flint), the former head of security at the Diamond Casino & Resort who has since become a police officer. Vincent informs the player of a new drug cartel that is in league with the Los Santos Police Department (LSPD) and is operating out of a chicken farm owned by the Cluckin' Bell chain of fast food restaurants. Seeing an opportunity to help each other, the player and Vincent work together to organise a robbery of the farm. (Note: As depicted in The Cluckin' Bell Farm Raid) Later, the player starts a bail enforcement agency with retired bounty hunter Maude Eccles (Jodie Lynne McClintock) and her daughter Jenette (Lexi Nimmo), capturing fugitive criminals for the rewards on their heads. (Note: As depicted in the Bottom Dollar Bounties update) Through Pavel, the player is also introduced to retired FIB agent Jodi Marshall (Regina Schneider), who has them run several clandestine operations to exact retribution on her former employers, using the Darnell Bros. garment factory formerly owned by Lester as their front. (Note: As depicted in the Agents of Sabotage update)

In 2025, the player purchases the McKenzie Field Hangar and begins running additional arms trafficking jobs with veteran gunrunner Oscar Guzman (Gabriel Sloyer), including the theft of a valuable gunship. (Note: As depicted in Oscar Guzman Flies Again) Later, the player is contacted by Martin Madrazo, who introduces them to Mr. Faber, a corrupt banker with ties to multiple criminal organisations, which he helps launder their money. With the assistance of Faber's business consultant Raf De Angelis (Bret Lada), the player purchases several legitimate businesses around Los Santos and begins using them as fronts for money laundering. (Note: As depicted in the Money Fronts update) Eventually, the player uses the wealth accumulated over the course of their criminal career to buy a luxury mansion, and meets former bank robber-turned-movie producer Michael De Santa (Ned Luke), who has heard of their exploits. At the same time, the player's old associate Avi Schwartzman (Rod Brogan) enlists their help to expose technology company KnoWay, (Note: KnoWay is a fictionalised parody of Waymo.) whose autonomous taxis are being used by the FIB for a mass surveillance scheme. The company retaliates by sending mercenaries to attack the player's mansion, but the player is able to defeat them with Michael's help. (Note: As depicted in the A Safehouse in the Hills update)

In 2026, the player is recruited by Faber and Raf for a robbery of the Kortz Center's art gallery, aiming to steal the centerpiece of the late Albert Crisp's collection, (Note: Albert Crisp was originally introduced as a major character and antagonist in Grand Theft Auto: London 1969.) replace it with a forgery, and sell the original to interested buyers in Europe. The heist is carried out successfully, and Faber expresses interest in using the player's talents to continue aiding his growing network. (Note: As depicted in The Kortz Center Heist update)

== Development ==
Grand Theft Auto Online launched on 1 October 2013, two weeks after the release of Grand Theft Auto V. Many players reported that they had difficulties connecting to the game's servers and the Social Club web service, and others further reported that the game would freeze while loading early missions. Rockstar released a technical patch on 5 October in an effort to resolve the issues. The microtransaction system, which allows players to purchase game content using real money, was also suspended as a fail-safe. Problems persisted the second week following launch, and some players reported their player-character progress as having disappeared. Another technical patch was released on 10 October combating the issues, and players experiencing issues were told not to recreate their multiplayer avatars. As recompense for the technical issues, Rockstar offered a stimulus of GTA $500,000 (in-game currency) to the accounts of all players connected to Online since launch.

Rockstar announced in September 2015 that the PlayStation 3 and Xbox 360 versions of the online mode would no longer receive any additional content, due to limitations in the console capacity. This was criticised by Forbes writer Paul Tassi, who felt that Rockstar was "cutting out a lot of potential customers" who continued to play on the older systems, adding that the re-releases on PlayStation 4 and Xbox One were lacking in additional content. In June 2021, Rockstar announced that the game's servers for the PlayStation 3 and Xbox 360 versions would shut down on 16 December; microtransactions became unavailable for the platforms on 15 September, and Social Club tracking closed on 16 September.

In early 2021, a user known as "t0st" reported that they had found a way to reduce the loading times of Grand Theft Auto Online by up to 70% with an unofficial patch. Rockstar affirmed that the patch improved the game's load times, and officially implemented it through an update released in March 2021. They also thanked the user for the discovery, awarding them $10,000 from their Bug Bounty program.

A standalone version of Grand Theft Auto Online was released alongside the enhanced version of Grand Theft Auto V for the PlayStation 5 and Xbox Series X/S on 15 March 2022; it was free on the former for the first three months. In addition to graphical enhancements and various quality-of-life improvements, this version features some exclusive content, such as new vehicles, an auto shop called Hao's Special Works where select vehicles can be upgraded for elite driving performances, and the Career Builder, which provides players with enough in-game currency to set up one of four businesses upon creating a new character. For a limited time, players could permanently transfer their progress from the previous generation consoles; earned in-game money could only be transferred across the same console family (PlayStation 4 to PlayStation 5, or Xbox One to Xbox Series X/S). On 4 March 2025, all the content from this version of the game was made available for PC through a free upgrade.

In March 2022, Rockstar introduced GTA+, a paid monthly subscription service available for the PlayStation 5 and Xbox Series X/S versions of Grand Theft Auto Online, which features permanent in-game benefits, as well as access to exclusive content and, by September 2023, classic Rockstar titles including Grand Theft Auto: The Trilogy – The Definitive Edition. GTA+ has since been made available on PC with the enhanced version of the game released in March 2025.

== Additional content ==
Post-release content is continually added to Grand Theft Auto Online through free title updates.

Release timeline
2013	Beach Bum Update
2013	Holiday Gifts
2014	Valentine's Day Massacre Special
2014	Business Update
2014	High Life Update
2014	I'm Not a Hipster Update
2014	Independence Day Special
2014	San Andreas Flight School Update
2014	Last Team Standing Update
2014	Festive Surprise
2015	Heists
2015	Ill-Gotten Gains Part 1
2015	Ill-Gotten Gains Part 2
2015	Freemode Events Update
2015	Lowriders
2015	Halloween Surprise
2015	Executives and Other Criminals
2015	Festive Surprise 2015
2016	January 2016 Update / Drop Zone Update
2016	Be My Valentine
2016	Lowriders: Custom Classics
2016	Further Adventures in Finance and Felony
2016	Cunning Stunts
2016	Bikers
2016	Import/Export
2017	Cunning Stunts: Special Vehicle Circuit
2017	Gunrunning
2017	Smuggler's Run
2017	The Doomsday Heist
2018	Southern San Andreas Super Sport Series
2018	After Hours
2018	Arena War
2019	The Diamond Casino & Resort
2019	The Diamond Casino Heist
2020	Los Santos Summer Special
2020	The Cayo Perico Heist
2021	Los Santos Tuners
2021	The Contract
2022	The Criminal Enterprises
2022	Los Santos Drug Wars
2023	San Andreas Mercenaries
2023	The Chop Shop
2024	Bottom Dollar Bounties
2024	Agents of Sabotage
2025	Money Fronts
2025	A Safehouse in the Hills
2026	The Kortz Center Heist

=== 2013 ===
The Beach Bum update, released on 19 November 2013, added more beach-themed jobs and customisation content for players. The Deathmatch & Race Creators update was released on 11 December and allowed players to create their own deathmatches and races. The Capture Update was released on 17 December and added a new team-based capture the flag mode called Capture. On 24 December, the Holiday Gifts update added Christmas-themed items, discounts for in-game vehicles, weapons, apartments and other items, and snowfall to the game world. All Holiday Gifts featured in this update were later removed on 5 January 2014.

=== 2014 ===
Coinciding with the 2014 Valentine's Day, the Valentine's Day Massacre Special update was released on 13 February and added Bonnie and Clyde-themed content to the game for a limited time, until the end of February. The Business Update, released on 4 March, added multiple business-themed items to the game. On 11 April, the Capture Creator update was released and added the ability for players to create their own Capture jobs using the Content Creator. The High Life Update, released on 13 May, added several new contact missions, vehicles, clothing items, and weapons. It also added new apartments, the ability to own two properties at the same time, and the Mental State gameplay statistic that monitors player behaviour in-game. The I'm Not a Hipster update was released on 17 June and added hipster-themed customisation items, and retro-themed vehicles and weapons.

The Independence Day Special update was released on 1 July to celebrate U.S. Independence Day and added patriotic-themed vehicles, weapons, and customisation items for a limited time. The patch added new properties to Grand Theft Auto Online and the "On Call Matchmaking" feature that lets player accept a job invite and keep playing until the lobby is full. The San Andreas Flight School update, released on 19 August, added new features and vehicles related to the in-game flying school. The Last Team Standing update was released on 2 October and added 10 new jobs, motorcycles, weapons, and creator support for the Last Team Standing game mode. On 18 December, the Festive Surprise update was released and introduced two weapons, four holiday-themed vehicles, and several clothing items, which were made unavailable after 5 January 2015. The update also added the ability to buy a third property, and saw the return of snowfall to the game world.

=== 2015 ===
The Heists update, which added five multi-part missions that can be completed by teams of four players, was a highly anticipated feature of Grand Theft Auto Online. Aside from the heists, the update also introduced Adversary Modes, and several new weapons and vehicles. After numerous delays, the Heists update launched on 10 March 2015, suffering some initial technical difficulties due to the increased user load. Ill-Gotten Gains Part 1, released on 10 June, added new vehicles, clothing items, and weapon decals. Some gameplay features were also affected, such as a redesign of the in-game car websites, the addition of a first-person vehicle hood camera on the PlayStation 4 and Xbox One versions, and the ability to cycle through targets when using lock-on missiles, among other minor changes. Ill-Gotten Gains Part 2, released on 8 July, introduced additional vehicles and weapons. It also added the radio station The Lab, previously exclusive to the Windows version of the game, to all other versions. This was the final update released for both the Xbox 360 and the PlayStation 3 due to hardware limitations. The Freemode Events update launched on 15 September and added new game modes and activities. It also added the Rockstar Editor and Director Mode, previously exclusive to the Windows version of the game, to the Xbox One and PlayStation 4 versions.

Lowriders, released on 10 October, added new missions given by Lamar (Slink Johnson), eight vehicles, two weapons (the machete and the machine-pistol), and customization options, including new clothing items and tattoos. It also introduced a new vehicle shop, Benny's Original Motor Works, which allows players to modify lowriders, including upgrades such as interior customisation, hydraulics, and decals. Halloween Surprise, released on 29 October, introduced two Halloween-themed vehicles, the flashlight, and additional masks and ornaments, along with slasher-themed Adversary Modes; the content featured in this update was only temporary and was removed on 16 November. The Executives and Other Criminals update released on 15 December and added customisable Penthouse Apartments, over 20 vehicles (including purchasable superyachts), and a game mode called Extraction, as well as the ability to form organisations of players and access exclusive missions. The Festive Surprise update returned on 21 December with snowfall, both new and old festive-themed clothes and masks, and a new car. It also added a new Adversary Mode, which was released on 23 December.

=== 2016 ===
An update released on 28 January 2016 added a new Adversary Mode called Drop Zone and two sports cars. The Be My Valentine update launched on 10 February and, in addition to the content featured in the previous Valentine's Day-themed update, introduced new outfits, cars, and a couple-themed Adversary Mode. The Lowriders: Custom Classics update, released on 15 March, added seven vehicles available for customisation at Benny's Original Motor Works, along with new weapons, clothes, and an Adversary Mode called Sumo. Further Adventures in Finance and Felony was released on 7 June and added executive offices and cargo warehouses, available for purchase to all players who are part of an organisation, as well as new organisation-related missions, challenges, vehicles, clothing, weapon attachments, and an Adversary Mode called Trading Places. The Cunning Stunts update, released on 12 July, added 13 new vehicles and 16 stunt races.

The Bikers update, released on 4 October, introduced motorcycle clubs, which function similarly to organisations and come with purchasable clubhouses and businesses, such as counterfeit cash factories and weed farms, as well as club-related missions given by Malc (Walter Mudu), a character first introduced in Grand Theft Auto IV: The Lost and Damned. The update also added new bikes, biker-themed weapons, tattoos, and clothing items, and a new Adversary Mode. Released on 8 November, the Deadline update added a new Adversary Mode compared by critics to the light cycle races from Disney's Tron film franchise, specifically those seen in the 2010 film, Tron: Legacy. 13 December saw the release of both the Import/Export and Festive Surprise 2016 updates. The former, an expansion to the Finance and Felony update, introduced vehicle warehouses and Special Vehicle Work missions available to all players who are part of organisations. The latter added more Christmas-themed content to the game.

=== 2017 ===
Cunning Stunts: Special Vehicle Circuit, released on 14 March 2017, introduced special vehicle stunt races and 20 additional races. The Gunrunning update was released on 13 June and introduced purchasable bunkers, which players can turn into illegal weaponry research, storage, and production facilities. It also introduced new vehicles such as armoured personnel carriers and weaponised off-road cars, and the Mobile Operations Center (MOC), a semi-trailer incorporating a workshop where players can customise their weapons and vehicles. Smuggler's Run, released on 29 August, added purchasable hangars and a new business: air cargo smuggling. The update also introduced a number of new aircraft, which can be stored inside the hangars, and a new Adversary Mode.

The Doomsday Heist, released on 12 December, added a new take on heists. The eponymous Doomsday Heist, longer and more profitable than any of the original heists, is split into three "acts", which can be completed by a group of 2–4 players from start to finish. Each act features its own setup missions, half of which take place in freemode and can be sabotaged by other players. The update also introduced a new type of properties—underground facilities—which are required for the heist, a large extent of military-grade weapons and vehicles (including a tilt-rotor aircraft and a jetpack), and a new radio station (blonded Los Santos 97.8 FM, hosted by Frank Ocean). Later that month, the Festive Surprise update returned with new and old holiday-themed content.

=== 2018 ===
Released on 20 March 2018, Southern San Andreas Super Sport Series added new races, vehicles, and game modes. The After Hours update, released on 24 July, introduced a new nightlife-related business, alongside the return of "Gay" Tony Prince (David Kenner) from Grand Theft Auto: The Ballad of Gay Tony, who helps players run their nightclubs. Each club features an underground section that can be used to smuggle goods produced by the player's other businesses, such as drugs and weapons. The update also added new missions, vehicles, clothing items, one weapon (the Stone Hatchet), and songs by real-life DJs Solomun, Tale of Us, Dixon, and The Black Madonna, which play on a new radio station called LS-UR. All four DJs can also be hired to perform at the player's club, after assisting them with a favor. One of the vehicles introduced in the update, the Oppressor Mk II (a hovering motorcycle that can be equipped with machine guns, homing missiles, and flare countermeasures), has since gained notoriety within the game's community for facilitating griefing.

The Arena War update, released on 11 December, introduced new demolition derby-themed Adversary Modes at the city's Maze Bank Arena, featuring armoured vehicles likened to those from Mad Max and Robot Wars. Once players buy a garage at the Arena, they can earn "Arena Points" from participating in these Adversary Modes, which are used to unlock special cosmetics for their character and vehicles, also added with the update. The Festive Surprise update returned later that month with snowfall, holiday-themed items, three new vehicles, two Arena War Adversary Modes, and a new weapon (the Up-n-Atomizer, a futuristic raygun).

=== 2019 ===
The Diamond Casino & Resort update, released on 23 July 2019, introduced the eponymous casino, where players can engage in various gambling minigames and purchase a highly customisable penthouse, which gives them access to exclusive areas of the casino and casino-related missions. The update also added new vehicles, clothing items, a new type of currency—casino chips—and other casino-related activities. The in-game gambling activities are not available in certain regions, including a few US states, due to differing laws and regulations.

The Diamond Casino Heist, released on 12 December, added a new heist reminiscent of those found in the single-player campaign. Unlike the original five heists or the Doomsday Heist, all setup missions are done in freemode and can be completed by one player, with only the heist itself requiring at least two people. Players can also hire NPC accomplices to facilitate the heist, who take different cuts depending on their skill level, and select from three possible approaches. To unlock the heist, players are required to purchase an arcade, which is used as a front for planning the robbery; the arcades themselves are highly customisable and feature an array of playable arcade games. The Diamond Casino Heist also introduced 20 new vehicles, two weapons (the Ceramic Pistol and the Navy Revolver), multiple clothing items, and a new radio station (iFruit Radio, hosted by rappers Danny Brown and Skepta). Later that month, the Festive Surprise update returned with new and old holiday-themed content, a new sports car, and discounts on several vehicles and properties.

=== 2020 ===
Gerald's Last Play is a series of six cooperative missions given by Gerald (Douglas Powell Ward) that were added on 23 April 2020, as a continuation of The Diamond Casino Heist update. The Los Santos Summer Special update, released on 11 August, added new yacht-themed missions, 15 vehicles, 8 Adversary Modes, 9 race tracks, and the Open Wheel Race Creator, which allows players to create their own custom tracks. It also featured several quality-of-life improvements, such as increasing the number of properties that can be owned by players.

First teased in July as "a new take on heists in an entirely new location", The Cayo Perico Heist was officially announced in November, when it was revealed that it would add a new island to the game's map; making it the biggest Grand Theft Auto Online content update to date. The heist featured in the update, which consists of robbing the drug cartel that controls the island, has been described as the "next evolution in Heists gameplay" because it offers more approaches than all previous heists, including the possibility of being completed solo from start to finish, and can play out in various ways depending on player actions. The update was also said to add new weapons, music, and vehicles, including a military submarine required for the heist. In December, it was revealed that The Cayo Perico Heist would also add a new nightclub called the Music Locker underneath the Diamond Casino & Resort, featuring real-life musicians Moodymann, Keinemusik, and Palms Trax; three radio stations (Music Locker Radio, Still Slipping Los Santos hosted by Joy Orbison, and K.U.L.T. 99.1 FM hosted by Julian Casablancas); and new songs on two of the already existing stations (FlyLo FM, compiled by Flying Lotus, and WorldWide FM, compiled by Gilles Peterson). The update was released on 15 December.

=== 2021 ===
On 27 May 2021, eight stunt races were added to the game, followed by seven new arenas for the Deadline mode on 24 June, and seven maps for Survival on 8 July. Los Santos Tuners, released on 20 July, added a social place called the LS Car Meet, where players can customise and test drive vehicles and complete specific challenges to unlock new cars. A reputation system tracks players' progress; by taking part in races and completing challenges, players increase their reputation and gain unique rewards. Also added with the update were auto shops, a new type of purchasable property which allow players to initiate robbery contracts, steal vehicles for export, or operate a legitimate car repair and customisation business. Aside from the LS Car Meet and the auto shops, the update introduced 14 new street races, 17 tuner vehicles, and collectible music sticks that unlock a new radio station (Media Player).

First announced on 8 December and released on 15 December, The Contract is a story-focused expansion that adds a new business, F. Clinton and Partner, a celebrity solutions agency run with the help of Franklin Clinton (Shawn Fonteno), one of the protagonists from Grand Theft Auto V. The agency's first major client is Dr. Dre, who had his phone containing unreleased music stolen and needs it recovered before the tracks are leaked. The missions added with The Contract are structured similarly to past heists, requiring players to complete several investigation jobs before they can move on to recovering the stolen music. Other missions featured in the update include agency contracts, payphone assassinations, and Short Trips, a three-mission storyline where players get to control either Lamar or Franklin. The Contract also adds 17 new vehicles (some of which can be equipped with exclusive upgrades, like a missile lock-on jammer), three weapons (the Heavy Rifle, the stun gun, and a compact EMP launcher), various clothing items, and a new radio station (MOTOMAMI Los Santos, hosted by Rosalía and Arca). Meanwhile, two of the already existing stations (Radio Los Santos, compiled by Big Boy, and West Coast Classics, compiled by DJ Pooh) were updated with new songs created by Dr. Dre and other artists, such as Anderson .Paak and Snoop Dogg, later released as singles on 4 February 2022.

=== 2022 ===
On 13 January 2022, a new Adversary Mode featuring Franklin and Lamar was added to the game. There was no public announcement from Rockstar regarding the mode, which Kotaku's Zack Zwiezen partly attributed to the ongoing #SaveRedDeadOnline campaign, in which numerous players criticized Rockstar for the lack of new content in Red Dead Online compared to Grand Theft Auto Online. The Criminal Enterprises, released on 26 July, added new missions which see players assuming the role of IAA agents, as well as an expansion to several previously released businesses—cargo warehouses, biker clubhouses, bunkers, and nightclubs. The update also introduced a number of new vehicles, customization options, and long-requested quality-of-life improvements, such as an increased payout and lower setup cost for older heists, a reworked Interaction Menu, and the ability to sell products from all businesses in non-public sessions. Other features, such as a car showroom which allows players to test drive vehicles before purchasing them, were introduced in the weeks following the update's release.

Los Santos Drug Wars, released on 13 December, introduced new story missions, vehicles, and clothing items, as well as a new social place, "The Freakshop", an abandoned warehouse frequented by juggalos which doubles as a storage for a mobile drug lab, also added with the update. The lab functions similarly to other passive businesses in the game, and can be upgraded to increase its productivity by completing a new type of side missions, Fooligan Jobs. The update also featured several quality-of-life improvements, such as an increased payout for the smuggling business and the ability to hide phone contacts. On 22 December, new Christmas-themed weapons and clothing items were added for a limited time, along with snowman collectibles and two random events (one inspired by the 1988 film Die Hard and the other by Dr. Seuss' Grinch character) that have a chance of triggering in the open world.

=== 2023 ===
On 16 February 2023, a multi-floor garage, shop robbery random events, collectible drug caches, and street dealers (who function similarly to the drug dealing minigame from Grand Theft Auto: Chinatown Wars) were added as a continuation of the Los Santos Drug Wars update. On 16 March, the second part of the Los Santos Drug Wars update, titled The Last Dose, was released, featuring new story missions, vehicles, and clothing items. San Andreas Mercenaries, released on 13 June, added new missions, mercenary work called "LSA Operations", an expansion to the hangar business, and several new vehicles, clothing items, and a new weapon (the Tactical SMG). The update also featured a number of quality-of-life improvements and other changes, including the ability to make an insurance claim for all destroyed player-owned vehicles at once, the removal of lesser-used vehicles from in-game websites, and new features for the in-game content creation tool. A new premium vehicle service called The Vinewood Car Club was made available exclusively for players subscribed to GTA+.

Released on 12 December, The Chop Shop update introduced a new business, the Salvage Yard, which is used as a front to perform high-stakes vehicle robberies in collusion with Yusuf Amir (Omid Djalili), returning from Grand Theft Auto: The Ballad of Gay Tony. It also added new vehicles, including purchasable law enforcement vehicles, races, and a new weapon (the Battle Rifle). Furthermore, animals were added to the PlayStation 5 and Xbox Series X/S versions of the game, after previously being exclusive to Grand Theft Auto V, while The Vinewood Garage, a new garage with 100 available parking spaces, was introduced exclusively for players subscribed to GTA+.

=== 2024 ===
On 7 March 2024, The Cluckin' Bell Farm Raid, a series of heist-like missions, was released as a continuation of The Chop Shop update, alongside several new vehicles and clothing items. On 25 June, the Bottom Dollar Bounties update was released, introducing a bail enforcement agency which has players assume the role of bounty hunters and capture fugitive criminals. The update also added Dispatch Work, a new type of side missions similar to the vigilante missions from previous Grand Theft Auto games, and several new vehicles and clothing items. On 25 July, graffiti collectibles and a pizza delivery side mission were added to the game. On 10 October, a new Survival mode set in Ludendorff, North Yankton, which sees players having to fight off waves of zombies, was introduced. On 31 October, for that year's Halloween update, the game world was temporarily modified to include UFOs flying in the skies of Los Santos, which had a chance to abduct players and bring them to the Fort Zancudo military base, from where they would have to escape. The update also added a limited-time Business Battle taking place at Fort Zancudo, and a non-lethal melee weapon: the Shocker.

On 1 November, Rockstar announced in a community post that an update set to release in December would introduce a new business revolving around "clandestine infiltration operations", alongside additional Dispatch Work missions, Job Creator updates, and other features. The post also revealed Rockstar's intentions to add all the exclusive content from the PlayStation 5 and Xbox Series X/S versions of the game to PC in 2025. The update, titled Agents of Sabotage, was released on 10 December, with additional content, including a new weapon and vehicles, releasing over the following weeks.

=== 2025 ===
On 4 March 2025, to coincide with the release of the enhanced version of the game for PC, Rockstar released a minor content update introducing the McKenzie Field Hangar as a purchasable property, additional vehicles and aircraft, and a new series of missions titled Oscar Guzman Flies Again. On 17 June, the Money Fronts update was released, introducing new purchasable properties to be used as fronts for money laundering: a car wash, a cannabis dispensary, and a helitour company. The update also added new vehicles, clothing items, and missions related to each of the new businesses, which increase their revenue and allow them to maintain their legitimate facade.

The next content update, titled A Safehouse in the Hills, was released on 10 December. It was first announced on 20 November, when Rockstar revealed that it would add purchasable luxury mansions to the game. Players who had previously completed a series of three missions, added on 13 November, benefited from a significant discount on the new properties. On 5 December, Rockstar provided further details about the then-upcoming update, revealing several of the features included with the new mansions, such as customization options, a personal AI assistant, and the ability to own pets and hire security guards. In addition to the mansions, the update also introduced new vehicles, story missions featuring the return of Michael De Santa (Ned Luke) from Grand Theft Auto V, and a mission creator, allowing players to create their own custom jobs.

=== 2026 ===
On 15 January 2026, a new Adversary Mode, Mansion Raid, was added to the game. On 29 January, three side missions were added, allowing players to take on the role of firefighters, forklift operators, and paperboys. On 17 June, Rockstar announced the addition of a new heist, to take place at the Kortz Center in Los Santos. In the lead-up to the update, Rockstar ran a "Fine Art Collector" program from 18 June to 13 July, allowing players to complete specific tasks and earn in-game rewards. On 9 July, further details about the update were revealed, including the addition of new vehicles and mission creator features, and an art studio inside player-owned mansions. The studio allows players to initiate the new heist and store any art pieces stolen during the robbery; these can in turn be sold for profit, or be kept as mansion decorations. The heist itself features multiple possible approaches, though failure to keep a low profile can lead to the stolen art decreasing in value. The Kortz Center Heist was released on 14 July.

== Reception ==
Reception

Aggregate score
Aggregator	Score
Metacritic	(PS3) 83/100 (X360) 80/100

Review scores
Publication	Score
Destructoid	7/10
GameSpot	6/10 (Note: Carolyn Petit of GameSpot originally gave the game a score of 7/10 in her review from 11 October 2013, but changed the score to 6/10 in her updated review from 6 May 2014.)
VideoGamer.com	9/10
Digital Spy	3/5

Many reviewers bemoaned their initial play experience as Grand Theft Auto Online suffered widespread technical issues at launch. Destructoid's Chris Carter felt the "messy launch" should have been delayed and IGN's Keza MacDonald lamented her "disastrous" play sessions. Digital Spy's Liam Martin lost his character data and considered the technical issues dwarfed pre-launch anticipation. Some reviewers generally praised the game's open-ended and dynamic content; VideoGamer's Jon Denton thought the gameplay's "endlessness" made up for its problems and Digital Spy's Martin complimented the game's scope.

The game's PlayStation 4 and Xbox One re-release received similar critical reactions. IGN's Dan Stapleton reported low player counts in matches, long wait times in lobbies, server disconnection and occasional crashes. "Because of that," he wrote, "I can't strongly recommend ... the multiplayer experience alone". VideoGamer.com found progression more streamlined and balanced than before and thought the "grind of just doing PvP until co-op Jobs arrive with regularity" was lost. However, they noted frequent server disconnection, especially during load screens. Game Informer's Andrew Reiner reported "minimal lag or issues in the expanded firefights and races".

Other game aspects received similar criticism. The character creation system was panned as unintuitive with resulting unattractive avatars. IGN's MacDonald thought the gameplay's "addictive rhythm" eventually faltered as errands became a monotony. GameSpot's Carolyn Petit thought the game's early mission palette was marred by "bland last team standing deathmatches". Eurogamer's Rich Stanton found cooperative gameplay repetitive as players completed the same menial objective cycle. GameSpot's Mark Walton thought the frenetic action lacked direction, with PvP an "unending cycle of pointless slaughter". He considered the reputation system a weak deterrent against foul play and thought the unbalanced game economy was further hindered by low mission payouts.

Reception has improved over time. VG247's Patrick Garratt felt the San Andreas Flight School update incentivised player engagement with the oft-neglected aircraft missions by offering more liberal reward payouts. Digital Spy's Martin thought the Heists update encouraged teamwork and "pinpoint coordination", while IGN's Ryan McCaffrey found high replay value in the heists' volatile action. Eurogamer's Stanton enjoyed the strategic planning necessary to pull off a successful heist and thought players were required to think on their feet and adapt to changing scenarios. He further noted occasional gameplay pacing issues and technical hiccups such as mid-mission server disconnection.

The game won Best Multiplayer at the 10th British Academy Games Awards and from GameTrailers. Game Revolution and Hardcore Gamer nominated it for Biggest Disappointment. At the 2019 Golden Joystick Awards, the game was nominated for Still Playing and won Best Game Expansion for The Diamond Casino & Resort. Take-Two Interactive, Rockstar's parent company, stated that by February 2014, 70 percent of Grand Theft Auto V players with Internet access had played Grand Theft Auto Online, and that the game's micro-transactions system was the largest contributor to the company's digital revenue since the launch of Grand Theft Auto Online.

== See also ==
- Grand Theft Auto modding § FiveM
