= Grand Theft Auto V =

2013 video game

- Developer: Rockstar North (Note: Additional work by Rockstar San Diego, Rockstar Leeds, Rockstar Toronto, Rockstar New England and Rockstar London)
- Publisher: Rockstar Games
- Producer: Leslie Benzies
- Designers: Leslie Benzies; Imran Sarwar
- Programmer: Adam Fowler
- Artist: Aaron Garbut
- Writers: Dan Houser; Rupert Humphries; Michael Unsworth
- Composers: Tangerine Dream; Woody Jackson; The Alchemist; Oh No
- Series: Grand Theft Auto
- Engine: RAGE
- Platforms: PlayStation 3; Xbox 360; PlayStation 4; Xbox One; Windows; PlayStation 5; Xbox Series X/S
- Release: 17 September 2013: PS3, Xbox 360; 17 September 2013; PS4, Xbox One; 18 November 2014; Windows; 14 April 2015; PS5, Xbox Series X/S; 15 March 2022
- Genre: Action-adventure
- Modes: Single-player, multiplayer

Grand Theft Auto V is a 2013 action-adventure game developed by Rockstar North and published by Rockstar Games. It is the seventh main entry in the Grand Theft Auto series, following 2008's Grand Theft Auto IV, and the fifteenth entry overall. Set within the fictional state of San Andreas, based on Southern California, the single-player story follows three protagonists—retired bank robber Michael De Santa (Ned Luke), street gangster Franklin Clinton (Shawn Fonteno), and drug dealer and gunrunner Trevor Philips (Steven Ogg)—and their attempts to commit heists while under pressure from a corrupt government agency and powerful criminals. Players freely roam San Andreas's open-world countryside and fictional city of Los Santos, based on Los Angeles.

The game world is navigated on foot and by vehicle, from either a third-person or first-person perspective. Players control the protagonists throughout single-player and switch among them, both during and outside missions. The story is centred on the heist sequences, and many missions involve shooting and driving gameplay. A "wanted" system governs the aggression of law enforcement response to players who commit crimes. In Grand Theft Auto Online, the game's online multiplayer mode, up to 30 players engage in a variety of different cooperative and competitive game modes.

Shared between many of Rockstar's studios worldwide, the game's development began around the time of Grand Theft Auto IV's release. The developers drew influence from many of their previous projects (such as Red Dead Redemption and Max Payne 3) and designed the game around three lead protagonists to innovate on the core structure of its predecessors. Much of the development work constituted the open world's creation, and several team members conducted field research around California to capture footage for the design team. The game's soundtrack features an original score composed by a team of producers who collaborated over several years. Grand Theft Auto V was released in September 2013 for the PlayStation 3 and Xbox 360, in November 2014 for the PlayStation 4 and Xbox One, in April 2015 for Windows, and in March 2022 for the PlayStation 5 and Xbox Series X/S.

Extensively marketed and widely anticipated, the game broke industry sales records and became the fastest-selling entertainment product in history, earning $800 million in its first day and $1 billion in its first three days. It received critical acclaim, with praise directed at its multiple-protagonist design, open world, presentation and gameplay. However, its depiction of violence and women caused controversies. Several gaming publications awarded the game year-end accolades including Game of the Year awards. In retrospect, it is considered one of seventh and eighth generation console gaming's most significant titles and among the best video games ever made. It is the third-best-selling video game of all time with almost 235 million copies shipped, and one of the most financially successful entertainment products of all time, with over $10 billion in worldwide revenue. Its successor, Grand Theft Auto VI, was released in 2026.

== Gameplay ==
Grand Theft Auto V is an action-adventure game played from either a third-person or first-person perspective. (Note: The first-person view is not available in the PlayStation 3 and Xbox 360 versions of the game.) Players complete missions—linear scenarios with set objectives—to progress through the story. Outside of the missions, players may freely roam the open world. Composed of the San Andreas open countryside area, and its fictional Blaine County and city of Los Santos, the world is much larger in area than earlier entries in the series. (Note: Art director Aaron Garbut estimated that it is large enough to fit the game worlds of Red Dead Redemption, Grand Theft Auto: San Andreas and Grand Theft Auto IV inside of it.) It may be fully explored after the opening prologue without restriction, although story progress unlocks more gameplay content.

Players can take cover behind objects during firefights to avoid taking damage from enemies.

Players use melee attacks, firearms and explosives to fight enemies, (Note: Accessed via a pop-up "weapon wheel" that features eight slots corresponding to different weapon types) and may run, jump, swim or use vehicles to navigate the world. (Note: Players can alternatively hail taxicabs that drive to specific destinations.) To accommodate the map's size, the game introduces vehicle types absent in its predecessor Grand Theft Auto IV, such as fixed-wing aircraft. In combat, auto-aim and a cover system may be used to assist against enemies. Should players take damage, their health meter will gradually regenerate to its halfway point. (Note: Health is fully replenished by using first aid kits or consuming food and drink.) Players respawn at hospitals when their health depletes. If players commit crimes, law enforcement may respond as indicated by a "wanted" meter in the heads-up display (HUD). Stars displayed on the meter indicate the current wanted level (for example, at the maximum five-star level, police helicopters and SWAT teams swarm to lethally dispatch players). (Note: Players arrested or killed by officers during missions may restart from the last checkpoint.) Officers will search for players who leave the wanted vicinity. The meter enters a cool-down mode and eventually recedes when players are hidden from the officers' line of sight that displays on the mini-map for a period of time. (Note: Players may take alternative evasive measures like respraying their vehicle at chop shops, which instantly erases the wanted level.)

In the single-player mode, players control three characters: Michael De Santa, Trevor Philips and Franklin Clinton—criminals whose stories interconnect as they complete missions. Some missions are completed with only one character while others feature two or all three. Outside the missions, players may switch between characters at will by a directional compass on the HUD, although this feature is restricted at certain points during the story. During missions, characters may automatically switch to complete specific objectives. A character's compass avatar will flash red if he is in danger and needs help, and flash white if he has a strategic advantage. Though players complete missions with the protagonists, the more difficult heist missions require aid from AI-controlled accomplices with unique skill sets like computer hacking and driving. If an accomplice survives a successful heist, they take a cut from the cash reward and may be available for later missions with improvements to their unique skills. Some heists afford multiple strategies; in a holdup mission, players may either stealthily subdue civilians with an incapacitating agent or conspicuously storm the venue with guns drawn.

Each character has a set of eight skills that represent their ability in specific areas such as shooting and driving. Though skills improve through play, each character has a skill with expertise by default (e.g. Trevor's flying skill). The eighth "special" skill determines proficiency in an ability that is unique to each respective character. Michael enters bullet time in combat, Franklin slows down time while driving, and Trevor deals twice as much damage to enemies while taking half as much in combat. A meter on each character's HUD depletes when an ability is being used and regenerates when players perform skilful actions (for example, drifting in vehicles as Franklin or performing headshots as Michael).

While free-roaming the game world, players may engage in context-specific activities such as scuba diving and BASE jumping, and visit businesses such as cinemas and strip clubs. Each character has a smartphone for contacting friends, starting activities, and accessing an in-game Internet. The Internet lets players trade in stocks via a stock market. Players may purchase properties such as garages and businesses, upgrade the weapons and vehicles in each character's arsenal, and customise their appearance by purchasing outfits, haircuts and tattoos.

== Plot ==
In 2004, (Note: The game's prologue is set nine years before the main storyline, which takes place in 2013.) criminals Michael Townley (Ned Luke), Trevor Philips (Steven Ogg), and Brad Snider (Ryan Woodle) partake in a failed robbery in Ludendorff, North Yankton, (Note: Ludendorff is largely inspired by Fargo, North Dakota.) resulting in Michael being presumed dead. Nine years later, Michael lives with his family in the city of Los Santos under the alias Michael De Santa, having made a secret agreement with Federal Investigation Bureau (FIB) (Note: In Grand Theft Auto V, the FIB is a fictionalised parody of the Federal Bureau of Investigation (FBI).) agent Dave Norton (Julian Gamble) to stay hidden. Across town, gangbanger Franklin Clinton (Shawn Fonteno) works for a corrupt car salesman and meets Michael while attempting to fraudulently repossess his son's car; the two later become friends. When Michael finds his wife having an affair with her tennis coach, he and Franklin chase the coach to a mansion, which Michael damages in anger. The owner, drug lord Martin Madrazo (Alfredo Huereca), demands monetary compensation, so Michael returns to a life of crime to obtain the funds, enlisting Franklin as an accomplice. With the help of Michael's old friend Lester Crest (Jay Klaitz), a disabled hacker, they rob a jewellery store to pay off the debt.

Meanwhile, Trevor, who lives in squalor in rural Blaine County, hears of the heist and recognises Michael's work; Trevor had believed the FIB killed Michael in the Ludendorff heist. They reunite, forcing Michael to reluctantly accept Trevor back into his life. As time goes on, the protagonists' lives spiral out of control. Michael's criminal behaviour prompts his family to leave him. When he later becomes a movie producer, he comes into conflict with Devin Weston (Jonathan Walker), a billionaire venture capitalist and corporate raider, who attempts to shut down the studio. Michael thwarts his efforts and inadvertently kills his lawyer, to which Devin vows revenge. Meanwhile, Franklin rescues his friend Lamar Davis (Slink Johnson) from rival gangbanger Harold "Stretch" Joseph (Hassan Johnson), who sets up and attempts to kill him multiple times.

Concurrently, Trevor tries to consolidate his control over various black markets in Blaine County, waging war against the Lost outlaw motorcycle club, Latino street gangs, rival meth dealers, the private military company Merryweather, and triad kingpin Wei Cheng (George Cheung). Having broken their agreement, Michael is coerced by Dave and his superior agent, Steve Haines (Robert Bogue), to perform a series of operations with Franklin and Trevor to undermine the International Affairs Agency (IAA). (Note: In Grand Theft Auto V, the IAA is a fictionalised parody of the Central Intelligence Agency (CIA).) Under Steve's direction and with Lester's help, they attack an armored car carrying funds for the IAA and steal an experimental nerve agent from an IAA-controlled lab. As Steve comes under increasing scrutiny, he forces Michael and Franklin to break into the FIB building and erase evidence against him from the servers. Michael takes the opportunity to wipe the data on his own activities, destroying Steve's leverage over him.

Michael, Trevor, Franklin, and Lester start planning their final heist: raiding the Union Depository's gold bullion reserve. However, Trevor discovers that Brad was not imprisoned as he was led to believe, but killed in the Ludendorff heist and buried in Michael's grave. Deducing Michael had conspired to have him killed, Trevor feels betrayed and leaves Michael for dead during a shootout with Cheng's henchmen. Although Franklin rescues Michael, Trevor's anger causes friction within the group and threatens to undermine their plans. Meanwhile, Steve attempts to arrest Michael, but they, as well as Dave, become caught in a Mexican standoff between the FIB, the IAA, and Merryweather. Steve escapes while Michael and Dave are saved by Trevor, who has decided to collaborate with Michael on the Union Depository heist and then part ways.

Michael makes amends with his family, and the heist is successful. Around the same time, Franklin is approached by Steve and Dave, who contend that Trevor is a liability, and Devin, still seeking vengeance on Michael. Franklin is left with three options: kill Trevor, kill Michael, or attempt to save both in a suicide mission. Should Franklin choose to kill either Michael or Trevor, his relationship with the man he spares ceases. Otherwise, the trio, aided by Lamar and Lester, withstand an onslaught from the FIB and Merryweather before killing Cheng, Stretch, Steve, and Devin. Michael and Trevor reconcile, and the three protagonists cease working together but remain friends.

== Development ==
Rockstar North began to develop Grand Theft Auto V in 2008, around Grand Theft Auto IV's release. The development team totalled more than 1,000 people, including Rockstar North's core team and staff from parent company Rockstar Games' studios around the world. The proprietary Rockstar Advanced Game Engine (RAGE) was overhauled for the game to improve its draw distance rendering capabilities. The Euphoria and Bullet software handle additional animation and rendering tasks. Having become familiar with the PlayStation 3 and Xbox 360 hardware over time, Rockstar found they were able to push the consoles' graphical capabilities further than in previous games. Analyst estimations place the game's combined development and marketing budget at more than £170 million (US$265 million), which would make it the most expensive game ever made at that time. (Note: Media analyst Arvind Bhatia estimated that the development budget exceeded US$137 million. The Scotsman reporter Marty McLaughlin estimated that the combined budget of the development and marketing efforts exceeded £170 million (US$265 million).)

The open world was modelled on Southern California and Los Angeles, and its design and in-game render constituted much of the game's early work. Key members of the game world production team took field research trips throughout the region and documented their research with photo and video footage. Google Maps projections of Los Angeles were used by the team to help design Los Santos's road networks. To reflect and reproduce Los Angeles's demographic spread, the developers studied census data and watched documentaries about the city. The team considered creating the open world the most technically demanding aspect of the game's production.

A fundamental design goal from the outset was to innovate on the series' core structure by giving players control of three lead protagonists instead of one. The idea was first raised during Grand Theft Auto: San Andreas' development, but contemporaneous hardware restrictions made it infeasible. Having developed two Grand Theft Auto IV episodic expansion packs featuring new protagonists in 2009, the team wanted to base Grand Theft Auto V around three simultaneously controlled protagonists. The team viewed it as a spiritual successor to many of their previous games (such as Grand Theft Auto IV, Red Dead Redemption and Max Payne 3), and designed it to improve upon their gameplay mechanics. They sought to improve the action gameplay by refining the shooting mechanics and cover system and reworked the driving mechanics to correct Grand Theft Auto IV's awkward vehicle controls.

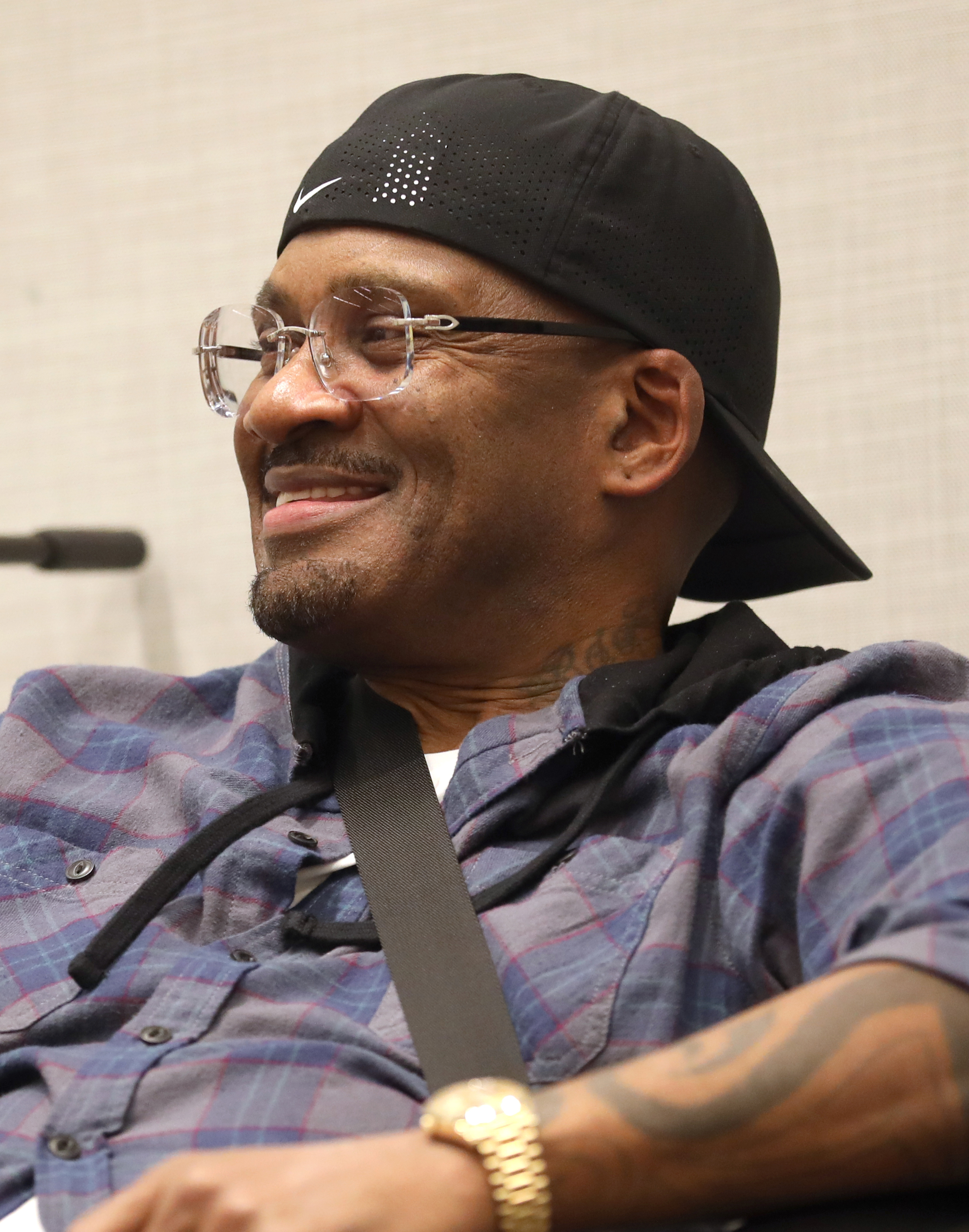
Shawn Fonteno

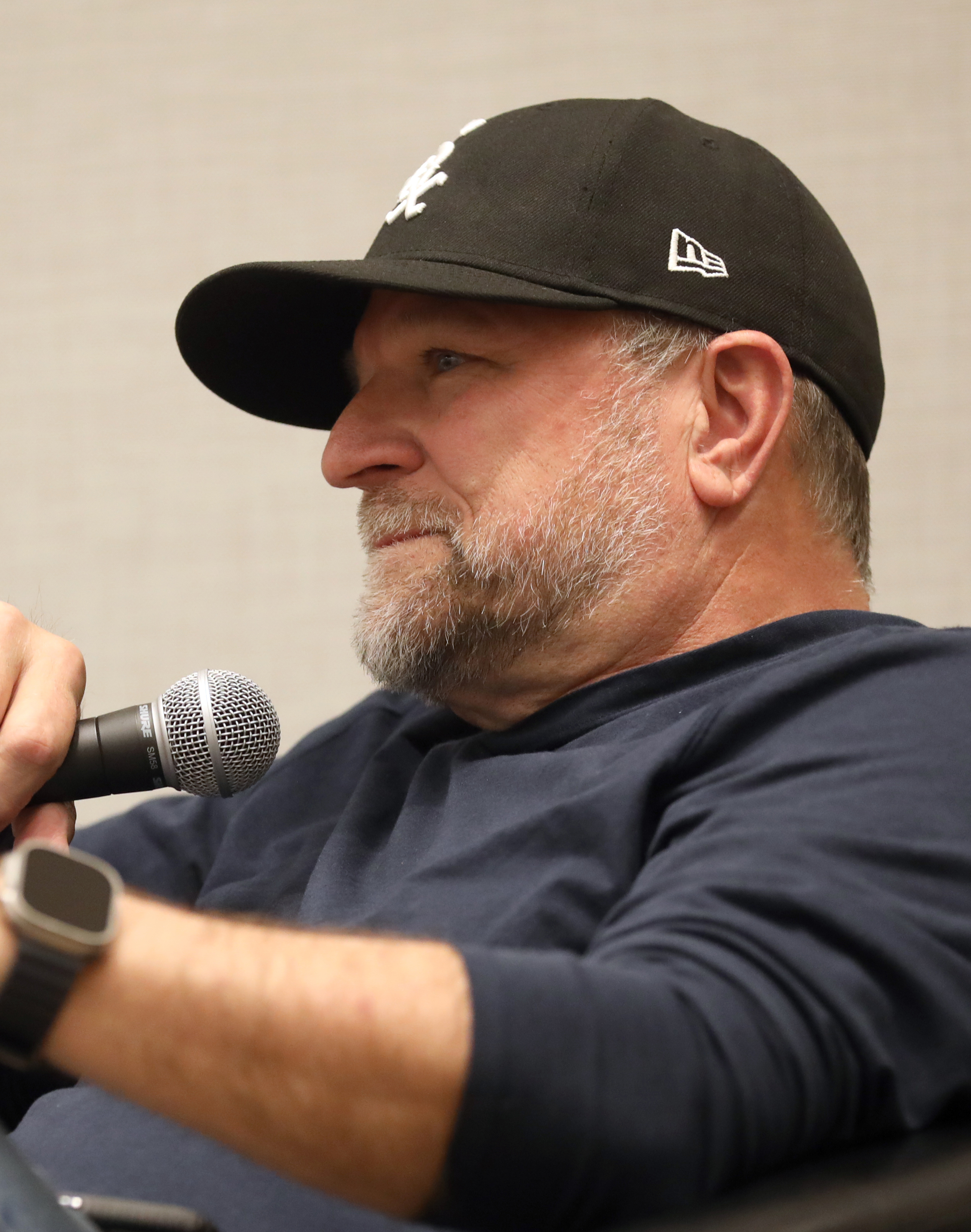
Ned Luke

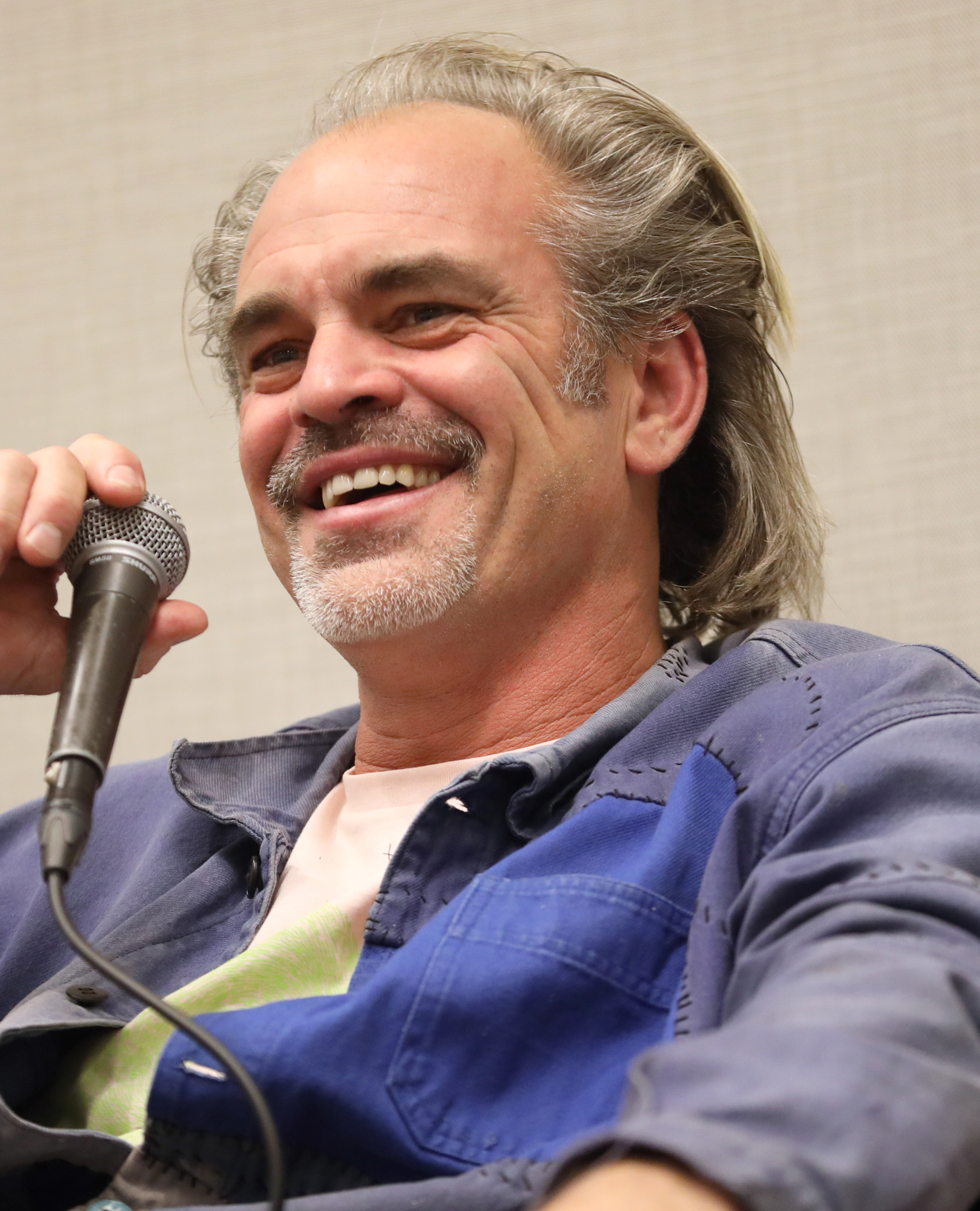
Steven Ogg

Fonteno, Luke, and Ogg (pictured in 2024) portray the game's protagonists, Franklin, Michael, and Trevor, respectively.

After an audition process, Ned Luke, Shawn Fonteno, and Steven Ogg were selected to portray Michael, Franklin and Trevor, respectively. Their performances were mostly recorded using motion capture technology, but dialogue for scenes with characters seated in vehicles was recorded in studios instead. The game's original score was composed by a team of producers who collaborated over several years. Licensed music provided by an in-game radio is also used. The team licensed more than 241 tracks shared between fifteen radio stations, with an additional two stations providing talk radio. (Note: The PlayStation 4, Windows, and Xbox One versions add another 162 tracks to the in-game radio.) Some of the tracks were written specifically for the game, such as rapper and producer Flying Lotus' original work composed for the FlyLo FM radio station he hosts.

=== Release ===
Rockstar Games announced the game on 25 October 2011. They released its debut trailer one week later, with an official press release acknowledging its setting. Journalists noted the widespread industry anticipation ignited by the announcement, which they owed to the series' cultural significance. The game missed its original projected Q2 2013 release date, pushed back to 17 September to allow for further polishing. To spur pre-order game sales, Rockstar collaborated with several retail outlets to make a special edition with extra in-game features. They ran a viral marketing strategy with a website for a fictional religious cult, "The Epsilon Program", that offered users the chance to feature in the game as members of the cult.

A comparison of the PlayStation 4 (left) and PlayStation 3 versions of the game. The enhanced re-release features greater draw distances and higher-resolution textures than the original versions.

A re-release of the game was announced for PlayStation 4, Windows (PC), and Xbox One at E3 2014. This enhanced version features an increased draw distance, finer texture details, denser traffic, upgraded weather effects, and new wildlife and vegetation. It includes a new on-foot first-person view option, which required the development team to overhaul the animation system to accommodate first-person gameplay. The PlayStation 4 and Xbox One versions were released on 18 November 2014. The PC version, initially scheduled for simultaneous release with the console versions, was delayed until 14 April 2015. According to Rockstar, it required extra development time for "polish". The PC version is capable of 60 frames per second gameplay at 4K resolution, and the Rockstar Editor lets players capture and edit gameplay videos.

Plans to develop single-player downloadable content (DLC) were later scrapped as the team focused resources on Grand Theft Auto Online and Red Dead Redemption 2. After Grand Theft Auto V's source code reportedly leaked online on 24 December 2023, possibly originating from members of Lapsus$, dataminers found at least eight sets of single-player DLC were in development but cancelled, including a Liberty City expansion.

A new version of Grand Theft Auto V, commonly referred to as "Expanded & Enhanced", was announced in June 2020. Released on 15 March 2022 for PlayStation 5 and Xbox Series X/S, it features technical enhancements and performance updates. A trailer released for the new version in September 2021 was met with negativity, becoming one of the most-disliked videos on PlayStation's YouTube channel; journalists noted that fans were frustrated by Rockstar's continued focus on the game instead of other projects such as a new Grand Theft Auto game, as well as a lack of apparent new features demonstrated in the trailer. The PC version received the enhancements in a free update on 4 March 2025.

=== Grand Theft Auto Online ===
Developed in tandem with the single-player mode, the online multiplayer mode Grand Theft Auto Online was conceived as a separate experience to be played in a continually evolving world. Up to 30 players (Note: The PlayStation 3 and Xbox 360 versions of Grand Theft Auto Online allowed up to 16 concurrent players, while all other versions allow up to 30 concurrent players.) freely roam across the game world and enter lobbies to complete jobs (story-driven competitive and cooperative modes). The Content Creator toolset lets players create their own parameters for custom jobs, like racetracks and deathmatch weapon spawn points. Players may band together in organised player teams called crews to complete jobs together. Rockstar Games Social Club extends crews formed in Max Payne 3's multiplayer mode to those of Grand Theft Auto Online. Players may create their own crews and join up to five total. Crews win multiplayer matches to earn experience points and climb online leaderboards.

Grand Theft Auto Online launched on 1 October 2013, two weeks after Grand Theft Auto V's release. Many players reported connection difficulties and game freezes during load screens. Rockstar released a technical patch on 5 October in an effort to resolve the issues, but problems persisted the second week as some players reported their character progress as having disappeared. Another technical patch was released on 10 October combating the issues, and Rockstar offered a GTA$500,000 (in-game currency) stimulus to the accounts of all players connected to Online since launch as recompense. Because of the widespread technical issues present at launch, many reviewers bemoaned their Grand Theft Auto Online experience but generally recognised its open-ended exploration and dynamic content as strengths.

Post-release content is continually added to Grand Theft Auto Online through free title updates. Some updates add new game modes and features, and others feature themed gameplay content, such as the Independence Day Special update that added patriotic-themed content on 1 July 2014. The widely anticipated Online Heists update launched on 10 March 2015 and suffered some initial technical difficulties due to the increased user load. Shortly after the game's PC release, some players reported being banned from Grand Theft Auto Online for using field of view and cosmetic mods in single-player. Rockstar stated in their official blog that nobody had been banned from Online for using single-player mods, but that recent updates to the PC version had the "unintentional effect" of making such mods unplayable. They stated that mods are unauthorised and may cause unforeseen technical problems and instabilities.

== Reception ==
=== Initial release ===
Reception

Aggregate score
| Aggregator | Score |
|---|---|
| Metacritic | 97/100 |

Review scores
| Publication | Score |
|---|---|
| Edge | 10/10 |
| Eurogamer | 9/10 |
| Famitsu | 40/40 |
| Game Informer | 9.75/10 |
| GameSpot | 9/10 |
| GamesRadar+ | 5/5 |
| IGN | 10/10 |
| Joystiq | 4.5/5 |
| Play | 97/100 |
| The Escapist | 3.5/5 |

Grand Theft Auto V received "universal acclaim" from critics, according to review aggregator Metacritic, based on 50 reviews for the PlayStation 3 version and 58 reviews for the Xbox 360 version. The game is Metacritic's fifth-highest rated, tied with several others. Reviewers liked the multiple lead character formula, heist mission design and presentation, but some did not agree on the quality of the story and characters. IGN called Grand Theft Auto V "one of the very best video games ever made", and Play considered it "generation-defining" and "exceptional". Edge wrote that it is a "remarkable achievement" in open-world design and storytelling, while The Daily Telegraph declared it a "colossal feat of technical engineering". It became the second-ever western-developed game to be awarded a perfect score from the Japanese video game magazine Famitsu, after The Elder Scrolls V: Skyrim.

CNET felt that the game encouraged players to engage with all three characters. Edge found that switching players helped avoid long travel times to mission start points. Because of the switching mechanic, Game Informer noted that players are kept "in the thick of the action" during shootouts. Eurogamer wrote that switching added a tactical element to shootouts as characters set up in strategic outposts would cause fewer "shooting gallery" situations than previous instalments. IGN felt the switching feature gave players more choice in their approach and made missions less predictable.

Giant Bomb considered the heist missions a welcome deviation from series typical mission structure. Eurogamer likened them to "blockbuster set-pieces", and GameSpot cited the 1995 film Heat as a stylistic influence on their design. Joystiq felt creativity and methodical approaches were encouraged. Polygon likened rapid character switching during heist missions to "film editing, with the player serving as editor, switching rapidly to the most interesting perspective for any moment". Computer and Video Games felt that overall mission design was more diverse than and lacked the escort errands of its predecessors.

Los Santos, the city featured in the game's open world. Reviewers praised its design and similarity to Los Angeles. The departure from Grand Theft Auto IV's Liberty City was well received.

Edge praised the game's graphical fidelity and absence of load screens. Play complimented the draw distances and weather and lighting systems. In Eurogamer's view, the lighting system was the game's most significant advancement. Official Xbox Magazine (OXM) thought that the game was "probably the Xbox 360's greatest technical achievement", and was surprised that the open world could render on the console. Reviewers lauded the open-world design and its streamlining of Los Angeles's geography into a well-designed city space. GameTrailers considered the Los Angeles emulation authentic and the open world "full of voice and personality". IGN and PlayStation Official Magazine (OPM) made favourable comparisons between Los Santos and Grand Theft Auto IV's Liberty City. OXM felt Los Santos surpassed the "grey and gritty" Liberty City. Reviewers praised the world's satire of contemporary American culture, while OPM opined that "the scathing social commentary is, of course, present and correct".

Destructoid called the sound design "impeccable" and praised the actors' performances, original soundtrack and licensed music use. IGN and Giant Bomb commended the music selection and felt that the original score enhanced dramatic tension during missions. GameSpot wrote that the score "lends missions more cinematic flavour". Edge said that the licensed music enhanced the city's "already remarkable sense of space" and that the original score improved the atmosphere of the gameplay. They summarised the game as "a compendium of everything Rockstar has learnt about the power of game music in the past decade".

Many reviewers found the land-based vehicles more responsive and easier to control than in previous games. Game Informer explained that "cars have a proper sense of weight, while retaining the agility necessary for navigating through traffic at high speeds". In addition to the vehicle handling, most reviewers noted the shooting mechanics were tighter than they had been in previous games, but Destructoid felt that in spite of the improvements, auto-aim was "twitchy and unreliable" and cover mechanics "still come off as dated and unwieldy". Some reviewers felt the game solved a persistent problem by adding mid-mission checkpoints.

The story and characters—particularly Trevor—polarised reviewers. Some found the narrative inferior to previous Rockstar games and cited Grand Theft Auto IV and Red Dead Redemption's plot strengths. Others thought the protagonists' contrasting personalities tightened the narrative's pacing. GamesRadar thought the game negated the story inconsistencies and muddled morality of previous series entries. Trevor was considered a particularly "horrible, terrifying, psychotic human being—and a terrific character" by GameSpot. Eurogamer found Trevor "shallow and unconvincing", and that his eccentricities hurt the narrative and overshadowed Michael and Franklin's character development. Joystiq faulted the protagonists' perceived lack of likability, as the conflict between Michael and Trevor grew into a "seemingly endless cycle". The Escapist had difficulty connecting with the characters' emotions since they acted out of greed with no sense of morality and thus gave players little reason to support them.

=== Re-release ===
Re-release reception

Aggregate scores
| Aggregator | Score |
|---|---|
| Metacritic | (PS4) 97/100 (XONE) 97/100 (PC) 96/100 (PS5) 81/100 (XSXS) 79/100 |
| OpenCritic | 92% |

Review scores
| Publication | Score |
|---|---|
| Game Informer | 9.75/10 |
| GameSpot | 9/10 |
| IGN | 10/10 |
| PC Gamer (US) | 92% |
| VideoGamer.com | 10/10 |

Grand Theft Auto V's re-release similarly received critical acclaim. It is the highest-rated PlayStation 4 and Xbox One game on Metacritic alongside Rockstar's Red Dead Redemption 2, as well as the second-highest rated PC game alongside several others.

Game Informer considered the addition of first-person "another significant breakthrough for the series" in the vein of Grand Theft Auto III's shift to third-person from Grand Theft Auto's bird's-eye view. GameSpot found that playing in first-person heightened the impact of Grand Theft Auto V's violence, which made him reflect on morality and character motivation more than before. VideoGamer.com opined that players feel like inhabitants of the world, rather than "guns attached to a floating camera". The first-person view, in IGN's opinion, aided immersion and created a "surprisingly different experience". VideoGamer.com praised the "finer details" in first-person animations like camera lean when players take corners on motorcycles, or the navigational instruments in plane cockpits. Reviewers found playing the game more difficult in first-person, but Game Informer preferred the challenge.

GameSpot thought the improved graphics and spatial anti-aliasing made the open world "even more spectacular". They said that in first-person "everything looks bigger and more imposing". IGN favoured the PlayStation 4 version's graphics over the Xbox One but thought both consoles rendered the game well and maintained mostly consistent frame rates. They praised the increased frame rate and graphics options offered in the PC version. VideoGamer.com called the console version's frame rate so consistent it was "scarcely believable", although GameSpot cited occasional frame rate dips. They opined that the PC version let players "witness the full extent of Rockstar's admirable handiwork", but noted that it "retains evidence of its last-gen roots ... with simple geometry". VideoGamer.com praised the Rockstar Editor's accessibility on PC but criticised some of its limitations and camera angle restrictions. IGN appreciated the PC version's customisable controls, and GameSpot felt that constant switching between the mouse and keyboard and a gamepad was necessary for "the best experience". PC Gamer called the game "the most beautiful, expansive and generous" of the series.

On the game's multiplayer, IGN reported low player counts in matches, long wait times in lobbies, server disconnection and occasional crashes. "Because of that," they wrote, "I can't strongly recommend ... the multiplayer experience alone". VideoGamer.com found online character progression streamlined by comparison with the original version. According to them, the "grind of just doing PvP until co-op Jobs arrive with regularity" was lost, and newcomers would likely find multiplayer enjoyable and balanced. However, they wrote of frequent server disconnection, especially during load screens. GameSpot thought the online mode was fun but "still suffers from a lack of direction" for its open-ended and frenetic gameplay. Game Informer reported "minimal lag or issues in the expanded firefights and races".

The PlayStation 5 and Xbox Series releases received tepid responses from critics, who questioned the value proposition of a new version of the ageing title. While the improved visual fidelity and quicker loading times were singled out for praise, reviewers generally found the core gameplay, storytelling and character models dated. Hardcore Gamer thought the lack of new content made the upgrade difficult to recommend to PlayStation 4 and Xbox One players. GamingBolt was apathetic towards the visual enhancements but praised the increased accessibility for Online newcomers. Jeuxvideo.com thought the release offered the supreme console experience and highlighted the improved graphics and load times. Push Square faulted the antiquated humour but thought the visual and technical enhancements gave the "sunny sandbox a new lease of life".

=== Awards ===
Grand Theft Auto V received multiple nominations and awards from gaming publications. Before release, it won Most Anticipated Game at the 2012 Spike Video Game Awards. The game was review aggregators Metacritic and GameRankings's highest-rated for the year 2013. The game appeared on several year-end lists of 2013's best games, receiving Game of the Year wins from independent journalist Tom Chick, CNET, Edge, the 31st Golden Joystick Awards, the 5th Annual Inside Gaming Awards, the Spike VGX 2013 Awards, Slant Magazine and Time. It was named the Best Xbox Game by Canada.com, GameSpot, and IGN, and the Best Multiplatform Game by Destructoid. Rockstar Games and Rockstar North won Best Studio and Best Developer from Edge, and the BAFTA Academy Fellowship Award at the 10th British Academy Video Games Awards.

Various in-game elements were recognised with awards. Trevor was named Best Character for the Official Xbox Magazine's Game of the Year Awards 2013, while Lamar Davis won the Best New Character award from Giant Bomb. The music received awards from Spike VGX, Hardcore Gamer and The Daily Telegraph. Grand Theft Auto Online won Best Multiplayer from GameTrailers, and BAFTA, and Best Xbox 360 Multiplayer from IGN. Online was also nominated for Biggest Disappointment by Game Revolution and Hardcore Gamer. Grand Theft Auto V won Best Technical Achievement in the Telegraph Video Game Awards, and Best Technology at the 14th Annual Game Developers Choice Awards. The graphical and artistic design received awards from IGN, The Daily Telegraph and BAFTA, and a nomination at the Game Developers Choice Awards. The Academy of Interactive Arts & Sciences awarded the game with Outstanding Achievement in Gameplay Engineering, signifying "the highest level of achievement for engineering artificial intelligence and related elements which contribute to a challenging game".

The game received numerous other awards. It was awarded the title of Most Immersive Game at the Inside Gaming Awards. The general public voted for the game to win the User Choice Award at the PlayStation Awards 2013 and the Community Choice award from Destructoid. The game received the Platinum Award at the PlayStation Awards and was named the Best British Game from BAFTA. At IGN's Best of 2013 Awards, it earned multiple wins, including Best Xbox 360 Graphics, Best Xbox 360 Sound, and Best Action Game on Xbox 360, PlayStation 3 and overall.

| Date | Award | Category | Recipient(s) and nominee(s) | Result | Ref. |
|---|---|---|---|---|---|
| 7 December 2012 | Spike Video Game Awards | Most Anticipated Game | Grand Theft Auto V | Won | |
| 25 October 2013 | Golden Joystick Awards | Game of the Year | Grand Theft Auto V | Won | |
| 2 December 2013 | Satellite Awards | Outstanding Action / Adventure Video Game | Grand Theft Auto V | Nominated | |
| 7 December 2013 | Spike VGX | Game of the Year | Grand Theft Auto V | Won | |
| 7 December 2013 | Spike VGX | Best Soundtrack | Grand Theft Auto V | Won | |
| 7 December 2013 | Spike VGX | Studio of the Year | Rockstar North | Nominated | |
| 7 December 2013 | Spike VGX | Best Action Adventure Game | Grand Theft Auto V | Nominated | |
| 7 December 2013 | Spike VGX | Best Xbox Game | Grand Theft Auto V | Nominated | |
| 7 December 2013 | Spike VGX | Best PlayStation Game | Grand Theft Auto V | Nominated | |
| 7 December 2013 | Spike VGX | Best Voice Actor | Steven Ogg as Trevor Philips | Nominated | |
| 7 December 2013 | Spike VGX | Best Song in a Game | "A.D.H.D" by Kendrick Lamar | Nominated | |
| 7 December 2013 | Spike VGX | Best Song in a Game | "Sleepwalking" by The Chain Gang of 1974 | Nominated | |
| 7 December 2013 | Spike VGX | Character of the Year | Trevor Philips | Nominated | |
| 9 January 2014 | Game Developers Choice Awards | Game of the Year | Grand Theft Auto V | Nominated | |
| 9 January 2014 | Game Developers Choice Awards | Best Technology | Grand Theft Auto V | Won | |
| 9 January 2014 | Game Developers Choice Awards | Best Audio | Grand Theft Auto V | Nominated | |
| 9 January 2014 | Game Developers Choice Awards | Best Design | Grand Theft Auto V | Nominated | |
| 6 February 2014 | D.I.C.E. Awards | Game of the Year | Grand Theft Auto V | Nominated | |
| 6 February 2014 | D.I.C.E. Awards | Outstanding Achievement in Game Direction | Grand Theft Auto V | Nominated | |
| 6 February 2014 | D.I.C.E. Awards | Outstanding Achievement in Gameplay Engineering | Grand Theft Auto V | Won | |
| 6 February 2014 | D.I.C.E. Awards | Outstanding Achievement in Visual Engineering | Grand Theft Auto V | Nominated | |
| 6 February 2014 | D.I.C.E. Awards | Outstanding Achievement in Sound Design | Grand Theft Auto V | Nominated | |
| 6 February 2014 | D.I.C.E. Awards | Outstanding Innovation in Gaming | Grand Theft Auto V | Nominated | |
| 6 February 2014 | D.I.C.E. Awards | Outstanding Character Performance | Trevor Philips | Nominated | |
| 13 March 2014 | British Academy Video Games Awards | Best Game | Grand Theft Auto V | Nominated | |
| 13 March 2014 | British Academy Video Games Awards | Action & Adventure | Grand Theft Auto V | Nominated | |
| 13 March 2014 | British Academy Video Games Awards | Audio Achievement | Grand Theft Auto V | Nominated | |
| 13 March 2014 | British Academy Video Games Awards | British Game | Grand Theft Auto V | Won | |
| 13 March 2014 | British Academy Video Games Awards | Game Design | Grand Theft Auto V | Won | |
| 13 March 2014 | British Academy Video Games Awards | Game Innovation | Grand Theft Auto V | Nominated | |
| 13 March 2014 | British Academy Video Games Awards | Multiplayer | Grand Theft Auto Online | Won | |
| 13 March 2014 | British Academy Video Games Awards | Performer | Steven Ogg as Trevor Philips | Nominated | |
| 13 March 2014 | British Academy Video Games Awards | Story | Grand Theft Auto V | Nominated | |
| 5 December 2014 | The Game Awards | Best Remaster | Grand Theft Auto V | Won | |
| 31 December 2016 | The Steam Awards | "Whoooaaaaaaa, dude!" | Grand Theft Auto V | Won | |
| 31 December 2016 | The Steam Awards | "Game Within a Game" | Grand Theft Auto V | Won | |
| 8 February 2019 | The Steam Awards | Labor of Love | Grand Theft Auto V | Won | |
| 31 December 2019 | The Steam Awards | Labor of Love | Grand Theft Auto V | Won | |
| 15 November 2019 | Golden Joystick Awards | Best Game Expansion | Grand Theft Auto Online – The Diamond Casino & Resort | Won | |
| 24 November 2020 | Golden Joystick Awards | Still Playing | Grand Theft Auto Online | Nominated | |
| 23 November 2021 | Golden Joystick Awards | Still Playing Award | Grand Theft Auto Online | Nominated | |
| 14 March 2022 | The Streamer Awards | Stream Game of the Year | Grand Theft Auto V | Nominated | |
| 10 November 2023 | Golden Joystick Awards | Still Playing Award | Grand Theft Auto Online | Nominated | |
| 17 February 2024 | The Streamer Awards | Stream Game of the Year | Grand Theft Auto V | Nominated | |
| 21 November 2024 | Golden Joystick Awards | Still Playing Award – PC and Console | Grand Theft Auto Online | Nominated | |
| 20 November 2025 | Golden Joystick Awards | Still Playing Award – PC and Console | Grand Theft Auto Online | Nominated | |

== Controversies ==
The mission "By the Book" requires players to use torture techniques including waterboarding to interrogate a man. Journalists noted the mission's function as political commentary, but some felt that the use of torture was in poor taste.

The mission "By the Book", which requires players to use torture equipment in a hostage interrogation, unsettled reviewers. They noted its political commentary on the use of torture by the United States government but found the sequence to be in poor taste. GameSpot felt that placing the torture scene in context with an analogous monologue by Trevor created a hypocrisy in the mission's function as a commentary device. Eurogamer felt the close-up camera and quick time events accentuated the sequence's impact beyond the violence depicted in previous Grand Theft Auto games, and considered the sequence lacking enough context to justify its violence. The mission received criticism from politicians and anti-torture charity groups. Independent journalist Tom Chick defended the torture sequence, and wrote that unlike Call of Duty: Modern Warfare 2's "No Russian" mission or the 2012 film Zero Dark Thirty, the underlying political commentary on torture in "By the Book" necessitated the violent content. The torture gameplay was cut from the Japanese release.

Several reviewers found the game's portrayal of women misogynistic; VG247 wrote the female characters were "either there to be rescued, shouted at, fucked, to be seen fucking, put up with, killed, heard prattling away like dullards on their mobile phones or shopping". Edge noted the game treated its all-male lead characters in a similar vein through their stereotyped tendencies towards violence. After GameSpot's Carolyn Petit claimed the game was misogynistic, her review was met with backlash as users responded with 20,000 largely negative comments on the webpage and a Change.org petition for her firing. Many journalists defended her right to an opinion and lamented the gaming community's defensiveness towards criticism.

Australian department stores Target and Kmart pulled the game from their stores in December 2014 after a Change.org petition against depictions of violence towards women in the game amassed over 40,000 signatures. Take-Two Interactive chief operating officer Strauss Zelnick publicly expressed the company's disappointment that the game had been pulled from the retailers, and affirmed that he "stand[s] behind our products, the people who create them, and the consumers who play them". IGN called the Change.org petition "misinformed", stating that its complaints about incentives for committing sexual violence in the game are untrue. Sexual violence in games is forbidden by the Australian Classification Board, meaning the game would have been refused classification. Kotaku said that the depiction of women is inherently problematic, and that Target were within their rights to refuse to stock the game and were obligated to respond to the petition's wide support.

Petit (writing for Kotaku) and online anti-harassment activist Ben Colliver criticised the game's depiction of transgender characters as sex workers with primarily muscular bodies, describing it as harmful transphobic stereotypes; Colliver wrote that the representation "does not reflect the complex, nuanced structures that often regulate transgender people's lives". The April 2022 re-release on PlayStation 5 and Xbox Series X/S removed the content from all portions of the game except Director Mode, meaning their models are accessible but without dialogue options. Some journalists recognised the removal may have been prompted by an open letter written by LGBTQ+ advocacy group Out Making Games, who requested the removal after reading Petit's article. The group praised Rockstar's decision to remove the content.

In October 2013, rapper Daz Dillinger issued a cease and desist letter to Rockstar Games and Take Two Interactive for allegedly using two of his songs without authorisation. (Note: The songs are "C-Walk" by Kurupt and "Nothin' But the Cavi Hit" by Mack 10 and Tha Dogg Pound, which were both produced by Dillinger and included in the West Coast Classics station.) In February 2014, television personality Karen Gravano of the reality television programme Mob Wives filed suit against Rockstar Games in allegation that a character in the game is based on her likeness and story and was depicted without her consent. (Note: Gravano is the daughter of former Gambino crime family underboss Salvatore "Sammy the Bull" Gravano and she featured in the first three seasons of Mob Wives, which follows women whose husbands or fathers have been arrested and imprisoned for Mafia-related crimes.) Rockstar filed to dismiss Gravano's lawsuit in April, and stated that the allegations are foreclosed by the First Amendment. In July, actress Lindsay Lohan filed a lawsuit, claiming elements in the game, including the Lacey Jonas character, were influenced by her image, voice and clothing line without permission. Rockstar responded in court papers that sought a dismissal of the case, saying that the case was frivolous and filed for publicity purposes. In 2016, both lawsuits were dismissed.

== Sales ==
Within 24 hours of its release, Grand Theft Auto V generated more than US$815 million in worldwide revenue, equating to approximately 11.21 million copies sold for Take-Two Interactive. (Note: The game's first-day sales record beat the previous record of US$500 million set by Call of Duty: Black Ops II.) The numbers nearly doubled analysts' expectations for the title. Three days after its release, the game had surpassed one billion dollars in sales, making it the fastest-selling entertainment product in history. (Note: The game's US$1 billion revenue broke the previous record set by Call of Duty: Black Ops II, which took 15 days to surpass US$1 billion in sales.) Six weeks after its release, Rockstar had shipped nearly 29 million copies of the game to retailers, exceeding the lifetime figures of Grand Theft Auto IV. On 7 October 2013, the game became the best-selling digital release on PlayStation Store for PlayStation 3, breaking the previous record set by The Last of Us, though numerical sales figures were not disclosed. It broke seven Guinness World Records on 8 October: best-selling video game in 24 hours, best-selling action-adventure video game in 24 hours, highest-grossing video game in 24 hours, fastest entertainment property to gross US$1 billion, fastest video game to gross US$1 billion, highest revenue generated by an entertainment product in 24 hours, and most viewed trailer for an action-adventure video game.

A digital version was released on 18 October for the Xbox 360, which went on to become the highest-grossing day-one and week-one release on Xbox Live. By May 2014, the game had generated nearly US$1.98 billion in revenue. As of August 2014, the game had sold-in over 34 million units to retailers for the PlayStation 3 and Xbox 360. By December 2014, the game had shipped 45 million copies, including 10 million copies of the re-released version. By April 2018, MarketWatch reported the game had generated about $6 billion and was the most profitable entertainment product of all time; it had nearly sold around 100 million copies by July 2018, and by July 2021, it had shipped over 150 million copies. More copies were sold in 2020 than any other year since the game's launch in 2013. By late 2023, Barron's reported the game's lifetime revenue figures had increased to $8.5 billion, consistently generating over $500 million annually with about 22 million monthly active players. By September 2026, the game had shipped almost 235 million copies worldwide across all platforms; and generated over $10 billion in revenue since its release, with its online multiplayer mode making over $1 million daily.

In the United Kingdom, the game became the all-time fastest-selling game, selling more than 2.25 million copies in five days. This broke the record set by Call of Duty: Black Ops at two million copies over the same period. It broke the day one record by selling 1.57 million copies and generating £65 million. In two weeks, the game sold more than 2.6 million copies and generated £90 million, which accounted for 52% of games sold in September 2013. After three weeks on sale, it beat Grand Theft Auto IV's lifetime sales in the United Kingdom. In its fourth week, it became the fastest-selling title to break the three million barrier in the UK, thus overtaking Black Ops II's lifetime sales. In November 2014, the game became the best-selling game of all time in the UK, overtaking Black Ops. The game was similarly successful in North America: it was the best selling game in September, representing over 50% of software sales and boosting overall software sales by 52% compared to September 2012.

== Legacy ==
Critics agreed that Grand Theft Auto V was among seventh-generation console gaming's best and a great closing title before the eighth generation's emergence. Polygon observed that the game would "bridge between games' present and the future", and declared it "the closure of this generation, and the benchmark for the next". Kyle Prahl of PlayStation Universe felt that the game "gives this console generation the send-off it deserves", and VideoGamer.com considered it "the ultimate swansong for this console cycle" that would "cast a long shadow over the next". Three days after its release, the game ranked second on IGN''s "Top 25 Xbox 360 Games" list. They considered that the open world's scale and detail succeeded the majority of other Xbox 360 games. They called the game "a triumph both for gamers and for the medium itself, and it deserves its runaway success". In November 2013, Hardcore Gamer placed the game third on their "Top 100 Games of the Generation" list. They cited its improved shooting and driving mechanics over its predecessors, and considered the multiple protagonist design "a welcome change of pace" that could become an eighth-generation gaming benchmark. In December, The Daily Telegraph listed the game among their "50 best games of the console generation". They called it a "cultural behemoth" that "will be Rockstar's lasting legacy".

In January 2014, Computer and Video Games ranked the game fourth on their "Games of the Generation" list. They said that for the first time, Rockstar created an "utterly beautiful" open world. They found that the game did away with Grand Theft Auto IV's repetitive mission design and focused instead on fun gameplay. In May, IGN ranked it eighth on their "Top 100 Games of a Generation" list and called it a "huge, raucous, and wildly ambitious bridge towards the [eighth] generation of console gaming". The next month, it placed third on IGN's "Games of a Generation: Your Top 100" list as voted by the site's readers. In August, Game Informer ranked it third on their "Top 10 Action Games Of The Generation" list. They compared the game's quality to that of its predecessor but thought that its ensemble character set-up, varied missions and multiplayer superseded Grand Theft Auto IV's placement on the list. They wrote of the story's absurd drama and the open world's vastness, and did not "regret a single second" spent playing the game. In November, Edge named it the fifth-best game of its generation and commented that "no other game studio is even daring to attempt an open world game in its tradition because there is simply no possibility of measuring up to [its] standards." In 2015, the publication rated it the second-greatest video game of all time.

The game ranked high on several best game lists determined by the public; it featured eighth on Empire's "100 Greatest Video Games Of All Time" list, and fifth on Good Game's "Top 100 Games" list, as voted by the magazine and programme's respective audiences. Grand Theft Auto V was the most tweeted game of 2015, despite being released over a year earlier. In 2025, Rolling Stone ranked it the third-best game, citing its "profound effect" on the medium. According to Circana senior director Mat Piscatella, the game was the third-most-played game on PlayStation in the United States in both 2024 and 2025.

Development of Grand Theft Auto VI was confirmed by Rockstar in February 2022; the game was formally revealed in December 2023 and released in November 2026.

=== Use in research and military ===
The game was used in a study by Intel Labs where they presented an approach for enhancing its graphics using neural networks. Reports in 2026 indicated that Ukrainian drone operators used a modified version of the game to help simulate navigation and targeting in urban environments during the Russo-Ukrainian war.
