= The Short History of the Long Road =

2019 American drama film

- Film poster
- Directed by: Ani Simon-Kennedy
- Written by: Ani Simon-Kennedy
- Produced by: Darren Dean; Bettina Kadoorie; Eddie Rubin; Kishori Rajan; Ani Simon-Kennedy; Dominique Telson; Cailin Yatsko
- Starring: Sabrina Carpenter; Steven Ogg; Danny Trejo; Maggie Siff; Rusty Schwimmer
- Cinematography: Cailin Yatsko
- Edited by: Ron Dulin
- Music by: Morgan Kibby
- Production companies: Relic Pictures; Astute Films; Eggplant Pictures; Reverse Osmosis Films; Bicephaly Pictures
- Distributed by: FilmRise
- Release dates: April 27, 2019 (Tribeca); June 12, 2020 (United States)
- Running time: 94 minutes
- Country: United States
- Language: English

The Short History of the Long Road is a 2019 American drama film, written and directed by Ani Simon-Kennedy. It stars Sabrina Carpenter, Steven Ogg, Danny Trejo, Maggie Siff and Rusty Schwimmer.

It had its world premiere at the Tribeca Film Festival on April 27, 2019. It was released on June 12, 2020, by FilmRise.

== Plot ==
Teenage Nola (Carpenter), has spent much of her life on the open road with her self-reliant father Clint (Ogg). The pair crisscross the United States in a refurbished RV, making ends meet by doing odd jobs. A shocking rupture, though, casts Nola out on her own. She makes her way to Albuquerque, New Mexico, in search of her mother, who she never knew. When her motorhome unexpectedly breaks down, Nola forges a bond with an auto body shop owner (Trejo). She then finds more about her mother and while getting to know her, she learns more about Clint and why he chose this lifestyle for them.

== Cast ==
- Sabrina Carpenter as Nola
- Steven Ogg as Clint, Nola's Dad
- Danny Trejo as Miguel
- Maggie Siff as Cheryl, Nola's Mom
- Rusty Schwimmer as Marcie
- Jashaun St. John as "Blue"
- Jackamoe Buzzell as Security Guard

== Production ==
In August 2018, it was announced Sabrina Carpenter, Steven Ogg, Danny Trejo, Maggie Siff, Rusty Schwimmer and Jashaun St. John had joined the cast of the film, with Ani Simon-Kennedy directing from a screenplay she wrote.

== Reception ==
The film received generally positive reviews. On the review aggregation site Rotten Tomatoes the film has a score of 89%, with an average rating of 7/10 based on 35 critics. The site's critical consensus reads, "A potential breakout vehicle for its writer-director as well as its star, The Short History of the Long Road finds fresh byways along its well-traveled path." Metacritic, which uses a weighted average, assigned the film a score of 60 out of 100, based on seven critics, indicating "mixed or average reviews".

Variety praised Carpenter's performance, stating that she "permeated the screen with an astutely soulful quality that's tough to turn away from."

== Release ==
It had its world premiere at the Tribeca Film Festival on April 27, 2019.
