= Shawn Fonteno =

American actor and rapper (born 1968)

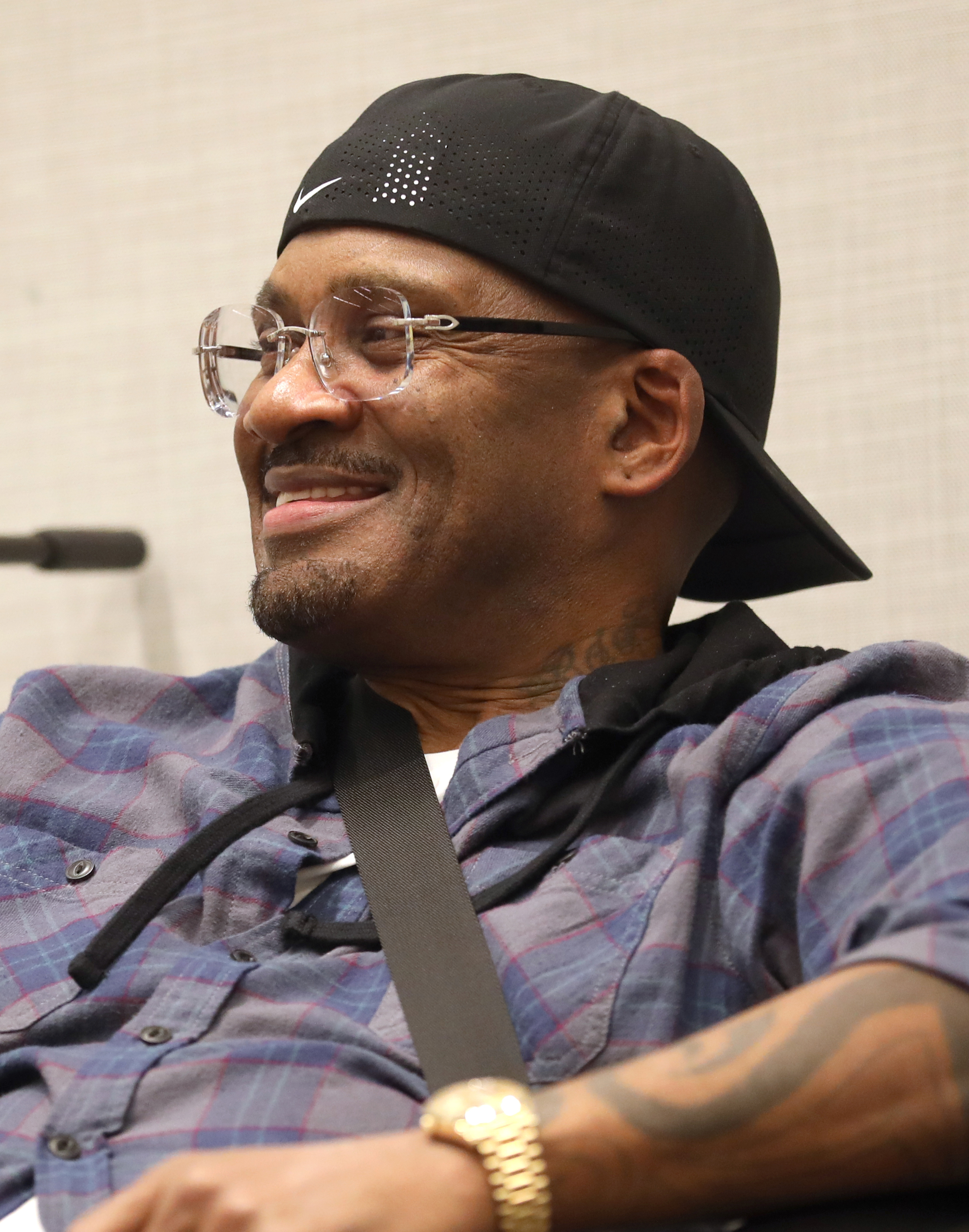
- Fonteno in 2024
- Born: Shawn Darnell Fonteno; April 8, 1968 (age 58); Watts, Los Angeles, California, U.S.
- Other names: Solo; Big Solo
- Occupations: Actor; rapper
- Years active: 1994–present
- Known for: Portrayal of Franklin Clinton in Grand Theft Auto V
- Children: 1
- Relatives: Young Maylay (cousin)

YouTube information
- Channel: Shawn Fonteno
- Subscribers: 100k
- Views: 1.8 million
- Last updated: October 4, 2026

Shawn Darnell "Solo" Fonteno (born April 8, 1968) is an American actor and rapper. He is best known for playing Franklin Clinton in the 2013 video game Grand Theft Auto V, a role he reprised in 2021 for Grand Theft Auto Online. Aside from his portrayal of Franklin Clinton, Fonteno has acted in films such as The Wash.

== Early life ==
Fonteno was born and raised in Watts, Los Angeles. He didn't know his father up until the age of 8, he met him in the hospital after his father had been shot in an armed robbery shootout. He joined the Crips street gang at a young age, dealing drugs and beginning to rise through the ranks before several near-fatal shootings and kidnapping attempts on his family inspired him to leave the gang. Fonteno was at one point the vice-president of an African American motorcycle club called the Choppers MC. He was still committing criminal acts with his crew but eventually decided to settle down and leave the MC life behind in good standing.

== Career ==
=== Music career ===
His rapping career was under the name Solo, from his gangster nickname OG Solo. Fonteno was affiliated with several record companies including DJ Pooh's Lench Mob, Death Row Records, and Priority Records in the early 1990s. He was at one point the hype man of a duo group with rapper Kam. Solo appears as a hype man for Kam and DJ Pooh's music video "Whoop! Whoop!". Solo appears in Kam's "Peace Treaty" music video. The song "Where I Come From" was listed under the duo Kam & Solo. He made an appearance in the documentary Beef 2, where he described a fight in which he claimed to have knocked Ice Cube out due to a disagreement about business and stole his chain. The episode played a significant role in the rivalry between Ice Cube's Westside Connection and Cypress Hill in the 1990s gangsta rap era.

=== Grand Theft Auto franchise and related work ===
Fonteno started voice acting in the Grand Theft Auto franchise by voicing a Grove Street Families gang member for the 2004 video game Grand Theft Auto: San Andreas. 9 years later, he voiced and provided the motion capture for the character Franklin Clinton for the 2013 video game Grand Theft Auto V. In 2021, Fonteno reprised his role alongside Slink Johnson (who portrayed Lamar Davis in the same game) in a live-action re-enactment of a cutscene where Lamar "roasts" Franklin. The original scene had experienced a resurgence in popularity years later when parodies were uploaded online, usually involving Lamar's character model being replaced with various popular culture icons. Later that year, Fonteno and Johnson again reprised their roles in downloadable content for Grand Theft Auto Online, which included a homage to the original roast cutscene.

In 2022, Fonteno published a memoir titled Game Changer: My Journey From the Streets to Your Video Game Console, which details how he left his former life as a gang member to become an actor.

In 2025, Fonteno collabrated again with his Grand Theft Auto V co-star Ned Luke (who portrayed Michael De Santa in the game) in a commercial for "Republic of Gamers" by Asus, which featured some references to the game.

== Personal life ==
Fonteno has a daughter named Bria. Fonteno is the cousin of voice actor and rapper Young Maylay who voiced Carl "CJ" Johnson in Grand Theft Auto: San Andreas. He currently resides in Atlanta, Georgia.

== Filmography ==
=== Film ===
Year	Title	Role	Notes
1994	Dead Homiez	Solo	
2000	3 Strikes	Big Mo	
2001	The Wash	Face	
2004	Beef 2	Self	Documentary
2017	Grow House	Bam	

=== Video games ===
Year	Title	Role	Notes
2004	Grand Theft Auto: San Andreas	Grove Street Families gang member	Voice – credited as "Solo"
2013	Grand Theft Auto V	Franklin Clinton	Voice and motion capture
2021	Grand Theft Auto Online	Franklin Clinton	Voice and motion capture "The Contract" content update

=== Music videos ===
Year	Artist	Title	Notes
1993	Kam	"Peace Treaty"	
1997	Kam & DJ Pooh	"Whoop! Whoop!"	

=== Commercials ===
Year	Title	Role	Notes
2025	Asus	Salesman	Republic of Gamers

== Published works ==
- Fonteno, Shawn 'Solo'; Jah, Yusuf (2022). Game Changer: My Journey From the Streets to Your Video Game Console. Fonteno LLC. ISBN 979-8424258275.
