= Grand Theft Auto VI: An Extended Look =

2026 promotional video game trailer

- Promotional image
- Written by: Rupert Humphries; Michael Wiafe
- Based on: Grand Theft Auto VI by Rockstar Games
- Produced by: Rob Nelson
- Production company: Rockstar Games
- Distributed by: Netflix; YouTube
- Release date: August 27, 2026
- Running time: 27 minutes
- Countries: United States; United Kingdom
- Languages: English; Spanish

Grand Theft Auto VI: An Extended Look is a 2026 promotional trailer previewing the video game Grand Theft Auto VI. The plot follows criminal couple Jason Duval and Lucia Caminos as they gain a reputation as underworld contractors in Leonida, a fictionalised version of Florida.

The trailer premiered on Netflix on August 27, 2026, and was then released to YouTube six hours afterwards, alongside a censored version for China. Featuring 27 minutes of game footage, it mixes compilation-style trailer sequences with longer narrative cutscenes.

Demand upon release crashed Netflix and live-streaming platform Twitch. In its first week, it topped the Netflix English language trailer chart in 87 countries. The trailer received praise for its visuals and the protagonist Lucia but some criticism for the characterisation of Jason.

== Plot ==
Criminals Jason Duval and Lucia Caminos approach a criminal den in Vice City to perform a drug pickup on behalf of their client Boobie Ike. Although the pickup proceeds smoothly, they suddenly become embroiled in a drug bust by police. Despite the complication, Jason and Lucia escape the compound unscathed with the drugs.

Sometime later, Jason and Lucia attend a meeting with local boss and associate Brian Heder, who gives them a job over dinner and reminds the former not to sink deeper into the criminal underworld. Amidst their ventures, gameplay footage of Jason and Lucia participating in various legal and illegal activities around Leonida, such as racing, committing robberies, and visiting clubs, is intercut to showcase their growing reputation among their peers.

Jason and Lucia act as getaway drivers for professional criminal Raul Bautista in the aftermath of the latter's robbery. Raul inducts them to his crew after being impressed by their skills. Afterwards, Jason and Lucia act as private security and protect their clients from several armed men interrupting the opening party for the first American headquarters of a Spanish-language television network, before cutting to dialogue from Cal Hampton telling Jason and Lucia to make the most out of their time as young adults.

== Production ==
=== Background ===
An Extended Look is based upon Grand Theft Auto VI, which is a 2026 action-adventure game developed and published by Rockstar Games, the eighth main Grand Theft Auto game, following Grand Theft Auto V (2013), and the sixteenth entry overall. The first trailer revealing the game was released in December 2023, and a second trailer was released in May 2025. Both trailers broke YouTube records, with the first trailer receiving 101 million views within the first two days of its release, and the second trailer receiving 475 million views across all platforms within 24 hours.

On August 6, 2026, Rockstar Games announced in a press release that it would release an "Extended Look" for Grand Theft Auto VI on August 27 to promote the game. The announcement also revealed new artwork for the game. This was to be followed by previews from content creators. Details surrounding the special remained unclear, prompting speculation about its format. Several theories suggested were a documentary special, gameplay footage showcase, a specific mission playthrough, or an extended conventional trailer.

=== Development ===
The game footage for the trailer was captured on PlayStation 5. Being arranged from footage of the game, the special depicts many of these activities, although in a linear narrative of the trailer medium rather than the freedom of the open world game. Tom Richardson, writing for the BBC, described the "armed heists, car chases and criminal underworld scenes" as part of the "trademark" of the Grand Theft Auto series. He saw the special as containing "satirical swipes at US culture" as well as "darkly comic interactions between characters".

Netflix approached Rockstar with the idea, wanting to pursue popular cultural moments, and journalists noted the partnership signalled that the game is "a major entertainment tentpole". The streaming service had a preexisting partnership with the developer, having released other Rockstar Games titles such as Red Dead Redemption and Grand Theft Auto: The Trilogy – The Definitive Edition through the platform.

=== Music ===
Several songs were prominently featured in the special, including "People Are People" by Depeche Mode, "Cars and Girls" by Prefab Sprout, "Devil Woman" by Cliff Richard, "Se Me Nota (Agárrame)" by Chimbala and Omega, "Love Bites" by Def Leppard, and "Against All Odds (Take A Look At Me Now)" by Phil Collins.

== Classification ==
There was no consensus over genre, being described on IMDb as an "Action Animation Crime Short" while Netflix described it as part of "Crime Films, Action & Adventure Films" in its official listing. Journalists such as Keith Stuart from The Guardian described it as "a very long teaser trailer". Typical video game trailers include cuts from across the game; by using extended sequences and scenes, it became difficult to distinguish between it being a trailer and a short film. Rotten Tomatoes described it as a documentary.

The special was a lynchpin of a larger trend toward video‑game and engagement‑based content on streaming platforms. Tyler Wilde questioned the ethical concerns over pirating the special when it is viewed as essentially an advert. Jennifer Maas argued that releasing onto Netflix first was a strategy "to signal to the larger entertainment industry" that the game is "not just a video game" but a "major entertainment tentpole". Take-Two Interactive CEO Strauss Zelnick, which owns Rockstar Games, stated in interview that Maas was correct, with "a pretty brilliant way to look at it". Listed on Netflix as a film, it is the first time raw video game footage has been released onto a major streaming service.

== Release ==
The special released on Netflix and YouTube on August 27, 2026. There was a six‑hour exclusivity window for Netflix before it went to the Rockstar Games channel on YouTube; the premiere began at 3 p.m. EST on Netflix before going to YouTube at 9 p.m. The release crashed Netflix due to high demand. It recovered quickly afterward. There was a spike in user error reports in the minutes before release, with 3,129 at 2:49 p.m. ET, eleven minutes before the special was released. In addition to Netflix, Twitch servers experienced technical issues upon the premiere, due to their huge viewership demand.

The review and social media embargo was set for the same time as the Netflix release, and Rockstar clarified that livestreaming was contingent on Netflix's platform rules for no unedited uploads. The amount Netflix paid to acquire the exclusivity window was not revealed. The special contained 27 minutes of gameplay footage and cutscenes. Large parts of the Chinese version of the release were censored. These included dancing, drug-related and sex-related content. This was not present in the initial version released on Netflix; the censorship was subsequently added in by Rockstar on August 31, three days after the special premiered. Rockstar and Take-Two issued DMCA takedowns of the unblurred trailer on Chinese platform Bilibili.

== Reception ==
=== Viewership ===
It debuted at No. 1 on Netflix in its first week, with 31.1 million views in the first four days of release, and later gathered 17 million views on YouTube after six days on the platform. It topped the English‑language film list in 87 of the 93 countries where Netflix is available, surpassing the second‑placed crime thriller The Whisper Man, which had 23.2 million views. Netflix's view counting is more stringent than YouTube's, implying that the Netflix debut had longer average watchtimes: views are total hours of viewership divided by runtime, whereas YouTube counts views per play.

It was the third-biggest Netflix event in 2026 for new sign-ups behind the final season of Stranger Things and the Ronda Rousey vs. Gina Carano MMA fight. 5% of US Netflix viewers who had not watched any title for the last 30 days returned to watch the Extended Look first, higher than any other show or movie on Netflix. Livestreams of reaction to the special reached 3.9 million viewers, covered by 9,000 individual streamers. This was spread across Twitch with 44% of total hours watched, YouTube with 34% and Kick with 20%. This was a total of 5 million hours, led by IlloJuan, with 200,000 viewers, El Rubius with 191,000 viewers and IShowSpeed with 177,000. The surge in numbers caused Twitch to crash for as long as 50 minutes for some users. Netflix's web traffic rose by 16% when the special released, and in the UK rose by 45% according to reports from Cloudflare. Twitch traffic increased to 35% at its peak, and YouTube traffic by 39%. Visits to the Rockstar Games website increased 172% worldwide and 1210% in the UK. The release drove new 100,000 sign-ups to Netflix in the US specifically for the special.

=== Critical and audience response ===
Morgan Park claimed the "human touches" of a "borderline life sim" like "eating, drinking, sleeping" "look[ed] so good it's almost overwhelming". He was critical of the derivative script from previous games and the abundance of action over narrative. Senior executive editor of IGN Ryan McCaffery praised the special and its visuals on X. He subsequently added in an opinion piece that the lack of UI he thought was to "add to the cinematic flair" of An Extended Look, only to discover that it was consistent with the game. Boone Ashworth for Wired praised the colorful cityscape but felt the gameplay sequences were "desaturated". Jacqueline Thomas praised the noticeable "ray-traced global illumination, reflection, and shadow effects". According to BBC News, fans on social media also praised the photorealistic graphics.

Christopher Livingston critiqued the character of Jason as "dull" but praised his voice acting reminiscent of Jame Gumb from the 1991 horror film The Silence of the Lambs. Jacqueline Thomas stated this intensified a desire for a PC edition to take advantage of high-end graphics effects. Isaiah Williams also praised the visuals as a convincing reason to play console games over PC games. The reveal of a paid exclusivity window was met with criticism from some fans. Response was mixed to Jason; his acting and voice were reported as "bland" and "dull", while others saw this trait as consistent with an ex-military protagonist. Audiences favoured the character of Lucia in the special based on her creative takedowns of enemies.
