= Dylan Rourke =

American actor

- Born: October 2, 1992 (age 34); New York City, New York, U.S.
- Education: Arizona State University
- Occupations: Actor; stand-up comedian
- Years active: 2013–present

Comedy career
- Medium: Film; television; stand-up
- Genre: Improvisational comedy

Instagram information
- Page: dylan_rourke
- Followers: 196 thousand
- Last updated: November 22, 2026

Dylan Rourke (born October 2, 1992) is an American actor and stand-up comedian. He portrayed Jason Duval in the video game Grand Theft Auto VI (2026).

== Life and career ==
Rourke was born in New York City and graduated from Arizona State University with a degree in business. He began his acting career in independent films, television, and live theater. He also performed for several years in comedian Fred Willard's MoHos sketch-comedy troupe, where he gained experience in improvisational comedy.

In November 2026, Rourke was revealed as the voice and motion-capture performer for Jason Duval, one of the two protagonists—alongside Lucia Caminos—in the video game Grand Theft Auto VI. On the game's release date, Rourke and the voice of Caminos, Manni L. Perez, shared a photograph on Instagram of themselves posing in front of a billboard advertising the game, alongside images of their respective characters.

== Filmography ==
=== Films ===
Year	Title	Role	Notes	Ref.
2021	Send It!	Skeeter Bowmen		
2023	Bury the Bride	David		
2025	Namas Dei: The Tucker J. James Story	Brendan Gregory		

=== Short film ===
Year	Title	Role	Notes	Ref.
2013	The Lone Wolf	Boyfriend		
2016	Relativity	Jonah		
2017	Jezebel	Henry		
2018	Legends of Rhye: The Afflicted	Nirin		
2018	Spectres	Darling		
2020	Cupcake	Gus	Also credited writer	
2022	Snow Globe	Marshall		

=== Video games ===
Year	Title	Role	Notes	Ref.
2026	Grand Theft Auto VI	Jason Duval	Voice and motion-capture	

=== Music videos ===
Year	Song	Artist	Ref.
2016	"Ghost"	Sleeping Wolf	
