= Resident Evil 4 HD Project =

2022 video game mod

- Developers: Albert Marin, Cris Morales
- Platform: Microsoft Windows
- Release: February 2, 2022
- Genre: Graphical mod

Resident Evil 4 HD Project is a mod for the Steam version of the survival horror video game Resident Evil 4. Created by a duo of modders, Albert Marin and Cris Morales, its purpose is to update the original remaster to the most thorough level possible and provide a "definitive graphical experience". While in the planning stages since 2008, its development started shortly after the game's PC release in 2014 and continued for the next seven years. It was fully released on February 2, 2022. The mod received unanimous positive reception from critics due to its extreme accuracy and attention to detail.

== Background and development ==
The mod's development took approximately 13,000 hours, and donations covered the approximately $15,000 expenses. It "remasters visuals across all gameplay sections, all cinematics", as well as the game's Separate Ways side game, which was available "on every official Resident Evil 4 release except the original GameCube one and the Oculus Quest 2 port".

In addition to texture improvements, many item models, the game's level geometry and lighting were also changed. Previous ports of the game from GameCube to other systems had caused bugs resulting in missing sounds and visual effects, which were carried over to the HD version. The mod restores these missing effects, such as depth of field.

The developers of the mod were stated to be "unfazed" by rumors that Capcom was remaking Resident Evil 4, which were eventually confirmed with a PlayStation blog post on June 2, 2022. Albert stated that "Capcom's latest remakes are way different from the original versions", and calling the original game still worthy of a remaster.

The mod was developed with no input from Capcom, although early in development the team was sent a planning document by a Capcom employee who was interested in the project. While not acknowledging it, the company did not attempt to hinder the development of the mod and allowed the developers to pin a post in the game's Steam forums.

After completing the HD Project, Marin stated that he had been hired by Nightdive Studios as a result of his experience remastering games, and that it was his first job in the video game industry.

== Reception ==
Alice O'Connor of Rock Paper Shotgun called Resident Evil 4 HD Project "one of the most impressive mods going", calling the "care and attention to detail" of the mod "stunning", as well as saying that it surpassed Capcom's official remaster and Resident Evil 4 VR. Remarking that it was "astonishing", she noted the fact that the textures were recreated precisely and said that it put Grand Theft Auto: The Trilogy – The Definitive Edition "to shame". She pointed out that one of the most impressive aspects was that many original textures were located by the modders in real life and re-photographed for perfect accuracy.

Robert Zak of PC Gamer called the original remaster of Resident Evil 4 not the best representation of the game possible, noting that the textures were only "marginally cleaner" than that of the original GameCube version. Saying that HD Project was "finally about to put that right", he also stated that "may my eyes be blinded" if it was not one of the best mods on PC. Shaun Prescott of the same publication described the mod as "a long, labor-intensive tribute to the classic game, born of the creators' frustration at Capcom's light-of-touch handling of the PC version".
