= Se Me Nota (Agárrame) =

Single by Chimbala and Omega
- Language: Spanish
- English title: "It Shows (Hold Me)"
- Released: 23 April 2021
- Genre: Dembow
- Length: 2:56
- Label: Allegro; Planet
- Songwriters: Leury Jose Tejeda Brito; Antonio Piter de la Rosa; Santiago Alexander De Jesus Montero; Reyes Bryan Peguero
- Producer: B-One

Music video
- "Se Me Nota (Agarrame)" on YouTube

"Se Me Nota (Agárrame)" (transl. "It Shows (Hold Me)") is a dembow song by Dominican rapper Chimbala and singer Omega. It was released for digital download and streaming on 23 April 2021, by Allegro Music and Planet Records. The track received a nomination at the 2022 Premios Tu Música Urbano, and was later featured on the Extended Look trailer for the video game Grand Theft Auto VI, in which the song is featured in the fictional radio station Cocoteo FM.

== Accolades ==
"Se Me Nota (Agárrame)" received a nomination for "Top Song – Dembow" at the 2022 Premios Tu Música Urbano, though it lost to "La Mamá de la Mamá" by El Alfa, CJ, Chael Produciendo and El Cherry Scom.

== Commercial performance ==
The only chart appearance for "Se Me Nota (Agárrame)" was on the Dominican Republic Urbano Airplay chart, at its peak position of number 16 on the issue dated 14–20 June 2021, earning 644 spins from urbano music stations in the country. It was the 55th best performing track of 2021 on the chart, garnering 10,880 spins throughout the year. It was also the 95th most played single in radio stations in the country throughout the year.

On 22 March 2022, "Se Me Nota (Agárrame)" received a Latin-field platinum certification by the Recording Industry Association of America (RIAA). Following its inclusion in the Extended Look trailer for the video game Grand Theft Auto VI (2026), the song earned 464,000 streams, from a 3,047% increase, in the United States within the 28–31 August 2026 period. On the issue dated 12 September 2026, the song debuted at number 24 on the US Hot Latin Rhythm Songs chart, making it both artists' first appearance on the chart.

== Charts ==
=== Weekly charts ===
Weekly chart performance for "Se Me Nota (Agárrame)"
| Chart (2021) | Peak position |
|---|---|
| Dominican Republic Urbano Airplay (Monitor Latino) | 16 |

2026 weekly chart performance for "Se Me Nota (Agárrame)"
| Chart (2026) | Peak position |
|---|---|
| US Hot Latin Rhythm Songs (Billboard) | 24 |

=== Year-end charts ===
Year-end chart performance for "Se Me Nota (Agárrame)"
| Chart (2021) | Position |
|---|---|
| Dominican Republic Airplay (Monitor Latino) | 95 |
| Dominican Republic Urbano Airplay (Monitor Latino) | 55 |

== Certifications ==
Certifications for "Se Me Nota (Agárrame)"
| Region | Certification | Certified units/sales |
|---|---|---|
| United States (RIAA) | Platinum (Latin) | 60,000^{‡} |
^{‡} Sales+streaming figures based on certification alone.
