= Grand Theft Auto VI =

2026 video game

- Developer: Rockstar Games
- Publisher: Rockstar Games
- Producer: Rob Nelson
- Designer: Stephen Donkin
- Programmer: Jonathon Ashcroft
- Artist: Aaron Garbut
- Writers: Rupert Humphries; Alexa D'Agostino; Elizabeth Gauvey-Kern; Michael Wiafe
- Composer: Justice (Note: Welsh electronic duo Overmono provided additional music.)
- Series: Grand Theft Auto
- Engine: RAGE
- Platforms: PlayStation 5; Xbox Series X/S
- Release: 19 November 2026
- Genre: Action-adventure
- Mode: Single-player

Grand Theft Auto VI is a 2026 action-adventure game developed and published by Rockstar Games. It is the eighth main entry in the Grand Theft Auto series, following 2013's Grand Theft Auto V, and the sixteenth entry overall. Set in the fictional US state of Leonida, based on Florida, the story follows the criminal duo of Jason Duval (Dylan Rourke) and Lucia Caminos (Manni L. Perez) as they lead a life of crime to escape from corrupt police officers in a state-wide criminal conspiracy. The game's open world allows players to freely roam Leonida and its Miami-inspired Vice City and engage in various side activities.

Preliminary work began in 2014 after the release of Grand Theft Auto V; principal production began after the 2018 launch of Red Dead Redemption 2. Rockstar's global development teams more than doubled since Red Dead Redemption 2. Miami and its surrounding areas were extensively researched for the game's world, which parodies Floridian and 2020s American culture. The protagonists' dynamic is inspired by Bonnie and Clyde, and the story was written to ensure players experience different areas of Leonida.

After years of speculation and anticipation, Rockstar confirmed in February 2022 that the game was in development. That September, footage from unfinished versions was leaked in what journalists described as one of the biggest leaks in the history of the video game industry. Grand Theft Auto VI was formally revealed in December 2023. After two delays, further leaks, and an extensive marketing campaign, it was released on 19 November 2026 for the PlayStation 5 and Xbox Series X/S.

Upon release, Grand Theft Auto VI was met with universal critical acclaim and achieved multiple records. The game sold 32.5 million copies before its release, becoming the most preordered video game of all time and one of the best-selling video games. Day-one retail sales reached $3.79 billion, making it the biggest entertainment launch in history. It is the only game from the 21st century to achieve an overall score of 99 on Metacritic among critics, tying with The Legend of Zelda: Ocarina of Time (1998) as the highest-rated video game on the platform.

== Gameplay ==
Gameplay screenshot of a player as Jason Duval shooting at a police vehicle, featuring the overhauled wanted system

Grand Theft Auto VI is a single-player action-adventure game set within an open world and played from a third-person view as either Jason Duval or Lucia Caminos. Players can choose to fight non-player characters (NPCs), steal vehicles, rob establishments or get into high-speed chases with the police. When roaming freely, players have various options for activities, such as skydiving, wrestling, basketball, exercising, kayaking, and scuba diving.

Throughout the game, players can gain or lose weight—a returning feature from Grand Theft Auto: San Andreas—and if the player stays awake as either character for days on end, it will become visible on their faces. The "Criminal Profile" rating system tracks each player character's reputation based on their actions, similar to the honour system in Red Dead Redemption 2. This system evaluates the level of violence and escalation used during crime, dynamically altering in-game consequences and NPC reactions based on each character's reputation.

In free roam, as Jason or Lucia, players can choose to split up or do activities together. Their relationship, or lack of one, depends on the player's actions. Grand Theft Auto VI has an in-game social media app called Snapmatic, returning from Grand Theft Auto V. The app is meant to parody 2020s social media trends and apps, such as TikTok and Instagram. Players may customise the appearance of Jason and Lucia, changing their hair, clothes, and accessories.

The game has multiple endings. Upon completing the main storyline and viewing the end credits, the game reverts the narrative state to the moment before the final point-of-no-return prompt. In this post-game sequence, Jason and Lucia opt to postpone the confrontation and return to Vice City. Because the timeline resets before the climax, the final mission marker remains active on the in-game map, allowing players to continue free-roam exploration and re-initiate the finale at their discretion to achieve alternative endings. However, aside from replaying the finale, the game does not include a standard mission replay feature for earlier story chapters.

== Synopsis ==
=== Setting and characters ===
Grand Theft Auto VI is primarily set in Vice City, a fictionalised Miami, Florida.

Grand Theft Auto VI is set in the fictional US state of Leonida, based on Florida. Its map is reported to be three times larger than the playable area of Red Dead Redemption 2. Leonida contains five counties: Vice-Dale County, Kelly County, Mariana County, Leonard County, and Lummox County. Notable locales featured are Vice City, (Note: Vice City was previously featured in Grand Theft Auto (1997) and was the main setting of Grand Theft Auto: Vice City (2002) and Grand Theft Auto: Vice City Stories (2006).) the Grassrivers, and the Leonida Keys (inspired by Miami, the Everglades, and the Florida Keys, respectively). Other locations include Ambrosia, Mount Kalaga National Park, and Port Gellhorn. The game world parodies 2020s American culture, with satirical depictions of social media and influencer culture, law-enforcement tactics and technology like police body cameras, and references to Internet memes such as Florida Man.

The story follows a criminal couple: Jason Duval (Dylan Rourke), who worked for local drug runners in the Leonida Keys after serving in the US Army, and Lucia Caminos (Manni L. Perez), the series' first canon female protagonist. (Note: Several outlets described Lucia as the series' first female protagonist; Grand Theft Auto (1997), the Game Boy Color version of Grand Theft Auto 2 (2000), and Grand Theft Auto Online (2013) featured optional female playable characters, the first two being avatars without unique dialogue from the male options and the third being mute.) After a failed score, the duo encounters a state-wide conspiracy and are forced to protect each other.

Other characters include Cal Hampton (Bobby Moynihan), Jason's paranoid friend; Boobie Ike (Mike Forbs), who runs a business empire in Vice City; Dre'Quan Priest (Naiqui Macabroad), owner of the record label Only Raw Records with Boobie; Bae-Luxe (Hood Brat) and Roxy (Krissy Celess), a musical duo signed to Only Raw under the name Real Dimez; Raul Bautista (Manny Pérez), a seasoned bank robber; Brian Heder (Stephen Root), a long-time drug runner in the Keys and Jason's landlord; and Mia Caminos (Roselyn Sánchez), Lucia's mother. Niko Bellic, the protagonist of Grand Theft Auto IV, appears briefly in the game's later missions, with original performance capture actor Michael Hollick reprising his role.

=== Plot ===
After a failed robbery, Lucia Caminos is incarcerated at a local correctional facility, losing custody of her son Tomás as a result. She later contacts her ex-boyfriend Jason Duval, informing him that he is the father of the child, and they rekindle their relationship following Lucia's supervised release. Wanting an affordable future for their son, the pair seeks jobs across the county and work for Jason's acquaintance Brian Heder, a local drug dealer in Mariana County. After a deal goes wrong, resulting in the death of Jason's friend Donnie, Brian decides to retire, leaving the couple unemployed. They soon find work from an acquaintance, Mattia, to deliver a package containing a bronze statuette and a hard drive. However, the pair is arrested; while being interrogated by the police, corrupt officer Aldo Méndez has the squad killed in an attempt to retrieve the package, but Jason and Lucia escape with it.

Jason is left wounded from a gunshot and hospitalized, while Lucia is attacked at their house by Méndez's henchmen. She survives and rescues Jason when Méndez's squad raids the hospital to kill him, before the couple goes on the run. Finding shelter at a rundown motel, Lucia helps Jason to recover and becomes embroiled with local gangsters and drug dealers. Following Jason's successful recovery, the pair executes many heists across the county. Seeking the contents of the hard drive, they use the stolen money to rent an apartment in Vice City. There, Jason befriends Boobie Ike and works for him while Lucia reunites with her mother Mia and helps her real estate business.

While searching for a contact to decrypt the hard drive, the pair reunites with Brian, who leads them to work for bank robber Raul Bautista. Impressed, Raul hires them for numerous heists across the city while finding a way to decipher the hard drive. However, tensions grow as Lucia finds herself working for Raul's competitor Kordell Grant. During a heist, Kordell deduces Lucia's plan, and Raul's partner Valentina betrays them. Although Kordell and Valentina are killed—allowing Jason to retrieve the money—and the hard drive is deciphered, Raul is later fatally tortured by Méndez, prompting Jason to end his suffering.

Lucia approaches Giorgio Gallo, the owner of the bronze statuette and the boss of Mattia, who reveals that the job was a way to get away from crime and take care of his family. Forgiving Mattia, Lucia and Jason help him leave Vice City and begin working for Giorgio, who hires them to assist his shipping business. They perform a heist to recover a shipment belonging to Giorgio's associate, crime lord Niko Bellic, while Giorgio creates a backup of the files on his computer. Lucia's lawyer Abe Gonzalez offers to help the couple escape their life of crime if they have at least $2,000,000 in Family Savings, but Giorgio later double-crosses them and leaves them to be arrested.

Statewide prosecutor Danica Howard offers Lucia a deal for her freedom in exchange for the hard drive's contents. The police station is swarmed by Méndez and his henchmen, seeking to kill Jason, who fights his way out. Lucia escapes captivity and arrives to help Jason defeat Méndez. Cornered and wounded, Méndez offers the pair a deal, promising them his protection in return for the hard drive. At this point, the player can choose to take Méndez's deal or kill him; regardless of the outcome, Jason and Lucia decide to exact revenge on Giorgio, storming his tower with Brian's help and killing him before uploading the contents of the hard drive implicating Senator Camila Fuentes.

==== Endings ====
The fates of Jason and Lucia are decided by their criminal profile levels, (Note: From lowest to highest, the levels are Professional, Hardened, Violent, Psycho, and Irredeemable.) their Family Savings balance, the level of their relationship, and the choices the player made throughout the campaign. The ending also differs based on whether the couple took Méndez's deal and the choices made afterwards.

If the pair made a deal with Méndez, they are surrounded by the police after killing Giorgio. If Jason has a high criminal profile level, he reneges on the deal and tells Lucia to take Danica's deal. He is then shot by the police while Lucia is arrested or is shot as well, depending on the player's choice to defend Jason or stay down; if Lucia is arrested, she is later released by Danica, allowing her to start a new life with Tomás in Liberty City. If Jason has a low criminal profile, Méndez takes the pair into custody but betrays and kills them, dumping their bodies in a swamp.

If Jason and Lucia killed Méndez, they escape from Giorgio's tower after killing him, but are later chased by the police due to the notoriety they have gained and are ultimately cornered on a bridge. Should the pair choose to make a last stand, they drive through the police blockade and are fatally shot, using their last breath to hold hands. Should the pair choose to surrender while having a low criminal profile, Jason is arrested while Lucia is let go after accepting Danica's deal and reunites with Tomás in Liberty City. If the couple had enough savings and their relationship level was maxed out, Lucia will pay Abe in two years to get Jason bailed out so they can start a new life together with Tomás. If the couple's relationship level was minimum, Jason is able to escape with the dog named Rocco and later leaves a duffel bag of cash at the doorstep of Lucia's house. Otherwise, if either Jason or Lucia has a high criminal profile, they will both be shot dead after deciding to surrender.

In the scenarios where both Jason and Lucia are killed, Tomás is left to be raised by Lucia's family in Liberty City. If the couple had enough savings, Abe will arrive two years later to give the money to Mia. In the endings where the pair killed Méndez or died before they could complete the deal, a post-credits scene shows Cal Hampton being sent the contents of the hard drive, which shock him.

== Development ==
Rockstar Games began preliminary work on Grand Theft Auto VI in 2014 after its predecessor, Grand Theft Auto V, was released, with early development starting in late 2018 after the release of Red Dead Redemption 2. Principal production began in 2020, code-named Project Americas. Pre-production on Project Americas began in 2015 with Rockstar initially hoping it would be co-developed alongside Red Dead Redemption 2 whose development was being helmed by Rockstar San Diego. However, as ambition grew for Red Dead Redemption 2, Rockstar pooled its studios to focus on the title and delayed work on Grand Theft Auto VI. After Red Dead Redemption 2 was released, Rockstar began adding people to help develop GTA VI, ultimately increasing its workforce from 2,441 in 2018 to 4,711 in 12 offices. Rockstar wanted to avoid the crunch practices that had become prevalent during production on Red Dead Redemption 2, offering staff paid time off if they had worked extra hours or additional pay.

Resources were reallocated from Red Dead Online and planned remasters (Note: Planned remasters of Grand Theft Auto IV (2008) and Red Dead Redemption (2010) were paused due to the backlash received by Grand Theft Auto: The Trilogy – The Definitive Edition (2021).) in 2022 to prioritise development. Rumours and analysts suggested the budget surpassed US$1 or 2 billion, which would make it the most expensive game ever developed; however, the figure remains unverified. Rockstar denied rumours that it cost over US$1.5 billion, although it would not disclose a specific figure. Rockstar requested employees cease remote work and return to offices from April 2024 "for productivity and security" as the release date neared. The Independent Workers' Union of Great Britain (IWGB) criticised Rockstar for contradicting promises to maintain flexible working conditions. Employees were concerned that effects to health and morale could prompt resignations and crunch, especially as managers still maintained flexibility. To maintain secrecy and operational security, Rockstar North's office in Edinburgh installed privacy film on its windows to avoid drones taking photographs through windows. As well, Rockstar blocked employees' personal laptops, tablets and phones from connecting to its systems; banned USB drives and other external storage devices; and forbade photography at work.

Rockstar fired 34 employees (Note: Thirty-one from Rockstar North and three from Rockstar Toronto) in October 2025 because Rockstar claimed they talked about the game in public or distributed confidential information. The Independent Workers' Union of Great Britain accused Rockstar of union-busting, stating the employees were attempting to unionise with labour organisers. 23 of the fired employees launched an unfair dismissal court case against Rockstar in September 2026. A vote to unionise 1,600 Rockstar staff in the United Kingdom is to end on 26 November. Rockstar president Sam Houser was involved in Grand Theft Auto VI's development, identifying problems and giving feedback on lighting, audio, game mechanics and tone after development milestones.

=== Research and design ===
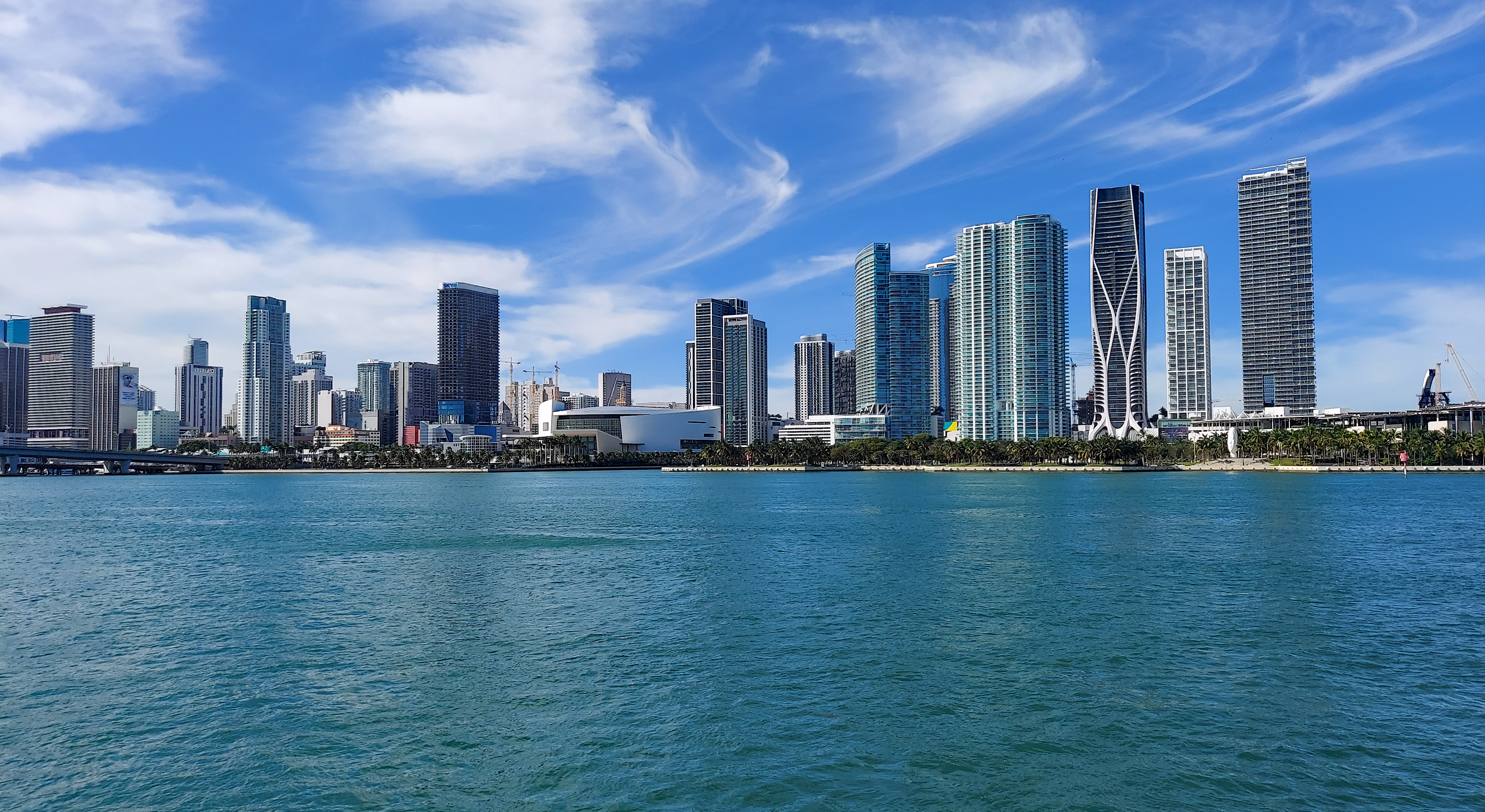
The culture of Miami and its surrounding areas were researched by Rockstar.

Rockstar North co-studio head Rob Nelson said that as time passed after the release of Grand Theft Auto V, the company felt growing pressure to produce a sequel that surpassed fan expectations. They conceived Grand Theft Auto VI's creative direction by examining older games for ideas they believed were incomplete due to time constraints or technological limitations. One such idea was a story placing romance as a central focus of the gameplay. The work for the characters concentrated on immersion and how they, and in turn the players, would interact with the game world, especially in free roam. This resulted in the creation of mechanics that generate changes in the appearance of characters based on circumstance, such as eating, exercising, and evading police.

Rockstar undertook research of Miami and its surrounding areas with a field team. Starting in 2015, they organised research trips to Miami to consult with locals to gather reference material, such as law enforcement, club promoters, ex-criminals, and gun dealers. The material was then cross-referenced with books and news articles to "get to the heart of which characters will bring [Vice City] to life". Writer Michael Wiafe said the studio's vision for Vice City was one which replicated the culture of Miami with "an open mind, a genuine appreciation and a deep curiosity". Rockstar deployed two subteams for the creation of NPCs and vehicles, the former from their Los Angeles office. The developers expanded the population of NPCs, varying each character by appearance, movement, and expression. More than 50 street artists were engaged to design murals for Vice City neighbourhoods. Rockstar worked with Miami-based stylist Jillian Carr from 2023 to design clothing mimicking real-life fashion trends.

=== Gameplay changes ===
Grand Theft Auto VI puts increased focus on realism and immersion in its gameplay systems compared to previous Grand Theft Auto titles, incorporating gameplay elements originally developed for Red Dead Redemption 2. Rockstar sought increased realism where it can help player immersion while feeling that some forms of realism in gameplay could become inconvenient or tedious for the player. At points during gameplay systems development, Rockstar had to abandon some realistic role-playing elements such as the player needing to buy groceries and restock the fridge in Jason and Lucia's safehouse. Rockstar said the experiment was not implemented as it would have "complicated the mechanics" as they sought to strike a balance between realism and ease of play.

Rockstar implemented a limited weapons loadout system previously designed for Red Dead Redemption 2 into Grand Theft Auto VI for added realism and to incentivise player decision-making on choosing loadout options. Rather than the unlimited weapon inventory system from previous series entries, Grand Theft Auto VI restricts the player to carrying two primary firearms and two sidearms at once. Weapons are stored and transported in the player's vehicle, much like weapons being stored on the player's horse in Red Dead Redemption 2. However, building the loadout system into a Grand Theft Auto title reportedly took years of development time as Rockstar struggled to decide on how they should approach its implementation. Rockstar were aware that players would notice missing gaps in the weapon UI due to the limited loadout so sought to redesign the UI accordingly. They struggled with formulating a new weapons UI as they kept prototyping alternatives before ending up back at a version of the weapon wheel. Like its predecessor, Grand Theft Auto VI did not include a first-person gameplay mode at launch, with the exception of when aiming certain weapons. Nelson explained that this was a result of prioritising the quality of third-person animations.

=== Narrative and writing ===
Grand Theft Auto VI is the first mainline Grand Theft Auto story since Grand Theft Auto (1997) written without Dan Houser, who left Rockstar in 2020. The initial outline for Grand Theft Auto VI's narrative had taken shape by late 2019, when it was decided it would feature the criminal couple of Jason Duval and Lucia Caminos in a Bonnie and Clyde-inspired story. Like Red Dead Redemption 2, the story would be structured around distinct chapters. Rockstar wanted to tell a deeper story than any previous Grand Theft Auto title, hoping that players would form a strong connection with protagonists Jason and Lucia like they did with Arthur Morgan. Just as Red Dead Redemption 2 allowed players to shape their own Arthur through dialogue choices with NPCs, Rockstar wanted to continue their stories being character-led. Jason and Lucia's safehouses across Leonida in Grand Theft Auto VI operate like Red Dead Redemption 2's interactable camps that provide an opportunity to build character bonds. In developing the relationship between Jason and Lucia and its role in the narrative, writer Elizabeth Gauvey-Kern said the studio "wanted both protagonists to be vulnerable, tough, flawed, right sometimes, wrong sometimes, able to learn from each other".

Like previous games in the series, Grand Theft Auto VI satirises American culture, but unlike them, the latest version does not make crude jokes about marginalised groups. In creating a satirical version of America in the 2020s, Rupert Humphries said the world "has to be more over the top, more insane, more in your face" than the real world it is based on. However, they wanted to be "careful" lest their satire become dated before or soon after the game's release. Characters were designed to "feel somewhat timeless" by avoiding the use of recent slang or alluding to memes with a short shelf life. A writing team, including comedy writers, was assembled in Los Angeles to create NPC dialogue in the open world. Open-world writing director James Horton argued that there are "no background" characters in Grand Theft Auto VI depending on what the player chooses to pay attention to.

=== Technology ===
Grand Theft Auto VI was built in the Rockstar Advanced Game Engine (RAGE), Rockstar's proprietary engine. It is Rockstar's first game specifically built for ninth-generation consoles, although Grand Theft Auto V was ported to the PlayStation 5 and Xbox Series X/S in 2022. Rockstar similarly used the 2014 ports of Grand Theft Auto V to the PlayStation 4 and Xbox One as a way to become familiar with the console hardware before entering full production on Red Dead Redemption 2. Grand Theft Auto VI is also playable on Xbox One via Xbox Cloud Gaming. Development heads Phil Hooker and Aaron Garbut said that the technology developed for Grand Theft Auto VI would lay the groundwork for future game development, reducing the time between future Rockstar titles.

The planned size and detail of the game's world meant a "horrifying" amount of work would be needed to develop the NPCs who would populate Leonida, said Rockstar North co-studio head Rob Nelson. Consequently, Rockstar Los Angeles was founded in 2023 to develop NPCs suitably realistic in their appearance and behaviours. NPCs are the most diverse of any Rockstar title, including physical variations in height and body size who can each have unique characteristics such as different types of freckles, moles, degrees of tanning, and tattoos. Nelson said that "we pushed interaction with NPCs as far as we could for Red Dead Redemption 2" but Grand Theft Auto VI takes it "much further". NPCs react more to player actions such as noticing the player eavesdropping on a conversation or nervously moving away upon seeing a masked Lucia drawing a gun before a store robbery.

Rockstar had begun working on NPC reactivity with Red Dead Redemption 2 and was able to get it working on previous generation consoles due to its more sparsely populated world as opposed to a denser, modern setting. Rockstar avoided the use of procedural generation for creating NPCs in Grand Theft Auto VI, opting to handcraft NPCs who have their own personality traits determined by what district they are in, what they have seen, and how the player has behaved towards them. The density of NPCs and simulating their associated AI and animation in the open world heavily taxes the Zen 2 CPU cores in ninth-generation consoles. Grand Theft Auto VI has over 600,000 unique NPC animations, up from 300,000 in Red Dead Redemption 2 and 55,000 in Grand Theft Auto V. The increased variety of NPCs such as different heights created additional animation work. The animation set for a 5 ft 6 in (1.68 m) NPC would not line up if it was to be directly mapped onto a taller 6 ft 2 in (1.88 m) NPC. Rather than creating duplicate animation sets for NPCs of different heights, Rockstar developed a system of retargeting animations on the fly between NPCs of different proportions as a way to save on memory usage on consoles.

Grand Theft Auto VI's weather system was re-engineered from Red Dead Redemption 2 to achieve what Owen Shepherd, Rockstar vice-president of art for lighting and rendering, called a "much more localised and persistent" world that "achieve[s] a sense of scale we haven't felt before". Rockstar had previously implemented a volumetric clouds and fog system in Red Dead Redemption 2 while Grand Theft Auto VI brings more realistic cloud formations that dynamically move across the game world to emulate the variety of weather conditions in Florida and its tropical climate. Like Florida, the state of Leonida in Grand Theft Auto VI can receive seasonal hurricanes and tropical storms with dynamic cloud formations allowing for localised rain showers in certain areas of the world. During storms, visibility is reduced and winds become more prominent. After heavy rain spells, persistent puddles can form on the ground and rainwater can pour from rooftops or lamp posts. Rainbows can also be observed under the correct lighting conditions.

=== Music ===
Grand Theft Auto VI features various radio stations covering genres such as pop, country, hip-hop, African, Latin, classic rock, metal, and more. Radio stations like V-Rock, Flash FM, and Emotion 98.3 return from Grand Theft Auto: Vice City and Grand Theft Auto: Vice City Stories, along with 1980s throwback station Vice City FM from Grand Theft Auto: Episodes from Liberty City. The game includes "Kamikazi", a previously unreleased song by the American singer-songwriter D'Angelo, who died in 2025.

Like previous entries in the series, Rockstar hired musicians to host some of the in-game radio stations in Grand Theft Auto VI, including Lana Del Rey and Morgan Wallen, who host the country station Back Country Radio, Puerto Rican singers Bad Bunny and RaiNao, who host the Latin station Cocoteo FM, and Robyn and Alex Consani, who host the pop station Flash FM. Miami-Dade County, Florida, natives and rappers Trina and Trick Daddy host hip hop radio station Dirty South Classics. "Weird Al" Yankovic voices the DJ for Vice City FM. Comedian Stavros Halkias portrays a host of the fictional right-wing talk radio station WKTT, which previously appeared in Grand Theft Auto IV. Brazilian singer Anitta hosts Ask Dr. Nita, a show on the talk station The Wipe in which she plays a doctor who answers questions about sex and relationships, with actress Barbie Ferreira voicing a character named Bobby who appears on the show. In a first for the series, players can listen to on-demand podcasts outside of a vehicle through their in-game smartphone. On 15 October, it was revealed that the French electronic duo Justice would compose the original score. Justice composed three hours of original music, and have collaborated with artists such as Tame Impala, SZA, and Gesaffelstein.

== Promotion ==
Promotions from top in clockwise order:
- Bloor-Yonge station in Toronto, Canada
- Waverley Bridge in Edinburgh, Scotland
- A bus shelter in New York City, US

Rockstar announced that the first trailer was set to premiere in December 2023 for the company's 25th anniversary. (Note: Within five hours, the announcement surpassed two previous posts about the game to become Twitter's most-liked gaming-related post. This was later surpassed by Rockstar's post announcing the trailer's 5 December release date, with 1.8 million likes in 24 hours. Other developers imitated the announcement formatting to promote their own trailers.) A low-quality version was leaked one day early on 4 December; Rockstar published the official version in response, revealing the title, protagonists, setting, release window, and consoles. The trailer broke some YouTube records within the first day, (Note: The first trailer broke the record for most first-day views on a non-music YouTube video within 12 hours, with 46 million. It had the third-most first-day views overall, with 93 million, and became the most-liked game trailer, with 8.9 million within 24 hours. It was the second-most-viewed game trailer by January 2024, with 168 million views, and the second-most-viewed trailer ever by November 2025, with 268 million.) and surpassed the lifetime viewership of Grand Theft Auto V's 2011 reveal trailer within two days, with 101 million views. The trailer drew several fan-created recreations, and its featured song, Tom Petty's "Love Is a Long Road", increased in popularity. (Note: "Love Is a Long Road" saw a near-37,000% increase in Spotify streams, had almost 250,000 searches on Shazam, and ranked second on the worldwide iTunes chart after the trailer's release.)

A second trailer was released on 6 May 2025, alongside a website update with 70 screenshots and several character and location descriptions. The trailer, recorded on the PlayStation 5, features the Pointer Sisters's song "Hot Together", (Note: "Hot Together" saw a 182,000% increase in Spotify streams after the trailer's release.) Wang Chung's "Everybody Have Fun Tonight", "Child Support" by Zenglen, and Tammy Wynette's "Talkin' to Myself Again". It received a record 475 million views across all platforms within 24 hours, (Note: This record surpassed Deadpool & Wolverine's 365 million views in 24 hours to become the biggest video launch. It was surpassed in March 2026 by Spider-Man: Brand New Day's first trailer, which received over 500 million views within 12 hours and 718.6 million within 24 hours.) and won Best Game Trailer at the Golden Joystick Awards in 2025.

Rockstar unveiled the cover art and special editions on 18 June 2026. The Ultimate Edition grants additional in-game clothing, hairstyles, locations, missions, tattoos, vehicles, and weapons, while preorders receive the Vintage Vice City Pack, featuring items inspired by Grand Theft Auto: Vice City (2002) and its protagonist, Tommy Vercetti. Whilst this content would be locked behind the Ultimate Edition, Rockstar confirmed to Kinda Funny that there would be no microtransactions in either version of the game at launch. Rockstar also confirmed that there is no generative AI.

Physical versions, containing download codes in lieu of discs to prevent leaks and reselling, are set to be available in shops on 12 November, allowing pre-loading a week before the game unlocks. Players and journalists criticised content locked behind special editions, as well as the lack of discs because of ownership restrictions, and some retailers refused to stock the game. Preorders opened on 25 June; by August, Take-Two called sales "unprecedented and astonishing", (Note: Take-Two did not share specific preorder figures. Newzoo estimated a record-breaking US$260 million in seven days and predicted the game would sell 37–51 million copies ($3.3–4.5 billion) in its first week.) with most opting for the Ultimate Edition. (Note: The digital intelligence firm Sensor Tower estimated that 89% of preorders were for the Ultimate Edition, far higher than the standard premium share of 50% for preorders and 10–20% overall.) In November 2026, just ahead of its release, Take-Two's CEO Strauss Zelnick stated that the company's presales expectations for the game had been exceeded significantly.

Preorders initiated the marketing campaign, for which Rockstar partnered with several social media platforms and companies such as Netflix and PlayStation. Dazed ran a Grand Theft Auto VI cover story for its September issue, published online on 26 August. An "extended look" at the game premiered on Netflix on 27 August, several hours before its YouTube release, followed by previews from content creators; Netflix approached Rockstar with the idea, wanting to pursue popular cultural moments, and journalists noted the partnership signalled that the game is "a major entertainment tentpole". Netflix and Twitch servers experienced technical issues upon the premiere, due to a substantial viewership demand and traffic. On 3 September, two limited edition themed DualSense controllers in black and white were announced with a release alongside the game. On 17 September, Rockstar announced Grand Theft Auto VI: The Album, a soundtrack album featuring 34 original songs. On 24 September, Rockstar announced the Grand Theft Auto VI: The Goodtime State – Vice City Collection, a collection of accessories and merchandise, such as a map of Leonida and a crossbody bag; they note on the site that the video game is sold separately.

Rockstar released a pre-launch trailer on 15 October. The song "Flower in a Hurricane" by Justice featuring Tame Impala, SZA, and King Gizzard & the Lizard Wizard was used in the trailer. Exclusive footage showcasing Jason using dog feces as a weapon to assault an NPC was featured in an episode of South Park titled "Guinea Pig on a Stick".

=== Miami marketing campaign ===
As Grand Theft Auto VI's Vice City setting is a fictionalised version of Miami, Rockstar wanted to use the real city as a marketing tool. Miami-Dade County approached Rockstar with a pitch for the marketing campaign to take over various parts of Miami. The marketing campaign was approved by the Miami-Dade County Commission in September, although some local Miami elected officials objected to the campaign such as suggesting the game promotes a culture of violence. County Commissioner René García expressed feeling "really uncomfortable" with the city collaborating with a "game that's depicting Miami like a crime haven" or could be glorifying the city's history of crime.

Starting from 1 October, the roof of the Kaseya Center was lit up with signage reading "Welcome to Vice City" that cost $975,000. In mid-October, wrapped cars based on the fictional vehicles of the Grand Theft Auto series with Leonida number plates were spotted on Miami streets, a Vice City blimp was seen in the skies, and Vice City-branded beach chairs and umbrellas were distributed on Miami Beach. Rockstar would later recreate real footage of the wrapped cars inside the video game and release it as "real footage" via a Miami-Dade County-branded social media account as a marketing tactic. On 6 November, Miami nightclub E11even was rebranded into the in-game equivalent club Nine1Nine. The opening night event featured a performance from rapper Flo Rida.

On 9 November, Rockstar Games announced a live music festival at Mana Wynwood in Miami starting on 21 November and ending on 22 November, featuring several musicians who appear on Grand Theft Auto VI: The Album, including Travis Scott, Cardi B, Ca7riel & Paco Amoroso, Justice, Metro Boomin, Don Toliver, Kodak Black, Fcukers, and Rauw Alejandro. Rockstar also collaborated with NBA basketball team Miami Heat for A Night in Vice City, a one-night event during the concurrent 2026–27 NBA season where the Heat played as "Vice City" against the Milwaukee Bucks on 18 November, a day before the game's release. Additionally, marketing extended over the team's uniform, stadium, and court, among others. Miami's jerseys and game day merchandise were designed in collaboration with Nike and Travis Scott's Cactus Jack Records. A special "Vice City" edition of NBA 2K27 will be released on 27 November, featuring Miami Heat player Bam Adebayo on the cover.

== Release ==
Details about Grand Theft Auto VI emerged from insider reports several years before its announcement, (Note: In 2018, The Know reported that the game would be set primarily in Vice City and partly in South America, and in 2021, Tom Henderson claimed its map could evolve akin to Fortnite. In 2020, Jason Schreier reported the game was "a moderately sized release" that would expand over time, and later said that it would feature two Bonnie and Clyde–inspired protagonists, including a Latina, and "a significant online mode" akin to Grand Theft Auto Online.) and the lack of official acknowledgement received media attention. Rockstar confirmed development was "well underway" on 4 February 2022. The game became highly anticipated, (Note: To incentivise enlistment, a US Army unit in Georgia offered soldiers a pass to play the game upon release.) for which it won awards at the Game Awards and Golden Joystick Awards in both 2024 and 2025; scammers used the anticipation to promote malware and fraud through false promises of early access. A meme indicated bemusement that surprising events occurred "before GTA 6". A trend of workers and employees requesting paid time off or calling in sick on the day of release also surfaced; a PCMag survey found that millions of American adults intended to take a day off to play the game. A method was used by players to alter their console's region to New Zealand to play the game ahead of time, in which the method was dubbed the "New Zealand Trick". In an Instagram reel posted by Tourism New Zealand, a caption had bantered that "one perk of seeing the sun first" was "getting GTA 6 first too", inviting players to use such trick.

Some publishers rescheduled games to avoid competition; Jason Schreier of Bloomberg News called it "a massive game of 4D chess playing out across the entire video game industry". Industry figures hoped the game would set new pricing trends, (Note: Some industry figures hoped the game would cost more than the standard US$70 to prompt a wider trend, but analysts noted it could limit sales; it was ultimately priced at $79.99.) and analysts predicted record-breaking revenue. (Note: Circana predicted the game would "rebound" the market with record consumer spending; Niko Partners estimated first-day sell-through exceeding US$1.2 billion, while DFC Intelligence projected first-year earnings of $3.2 billion (40 million copies)—doubling Grand Theft Auto V's highest-grossing launch—including $1 billion in preorders.) The game was nearly banned in South Korea, as members of the Game Rating and Administration Committee argued that the current "bodily exposure of sexual acts" found in the game "are depicted explicitly or excessively so as to disrupt social order". The board reportedly felt pressure to approve the game as they did not want to be "the sole country to refuse classification to the biggest game of the year".

The first trailer in December 2023 revealed a 2025 release window. Following March 2024 reports that the game was at risk of delay, Rockstar's parent company Take-Two Interactive said it remained on schedule for late 2025. Employees were doubtful due to the amount of remaining work, and in May 2025, the game was delayed to 26 May 2026. In November 2025, Rockstar delayed the game to 19 November 2026 for further polishing. Journalists noted the firings did not cause the delay but could impact deadlines; a Rockstar North employee said morale was "at rock bottom". In October 2026, industry sources reported that a PC release is expected in the first quarter of 2027.

On 10 November, Xbox announced that the game would be playable on the Xbox One console through Xbox Cloud Gaming. The game was released for PlayStation 5 and Xbox Series X and Series S systems on 19 November, with no Windows release scheduled as of November 2026. A former Rockstar producer said the studio typically develops for consoles first rather than personal computers because "it's always better to start with the constraints and then extend". In August 2026, Rockstar confirmed the game would run at 30 frames per second (FPS) on both consoles at launch. By October 2026, the game had reported to have contributed to a 22% increase in PlayStation 5 console sales. Comcast, an internet service provider in the US, reported that November 19 was their highest traffic day in the companies history, reaching 31% over an average days traffic load, partly due to people downloading the game, which made up about a quarter of the traffic.

=== Leaks ===
==== 2022: "teapotuberhacker" ====
A user known as "teapotuberhacker" (Note: Based on posting behaviour and IP address data, GTAForums staff believed "teapotuberhacker" was an account run collaboratively by two people: "Teapot", the original leaker; and "Lily", who offered to sell Grand Theft Auto V's source code in exchange for Ethereum but was not believed to be in possession of any hacked materials.) published 90 videos to the website GTAForums on 18 September 2022, showing 50 minutes of work-in-progress game footage. The hacker downloaded the files from Rockstar's internal Slack groups, and also threatened to publish source code, assets, and internal builds of Grand Theft Auto V and VI. Take-Two submitted takedowns of YouTube videos and forum threads showing the footage. Journalists described the event as one of the biggest leaks in video game history, called "a nightmare for Rockstar" by Schreier, and "a PR disaster" by Jefferies Group analyst Andrew Uerkwitz. Several developers offered sympathies, and they also shared work-in-progress footage of their games in solidarity. Rockstar lamented the manner in which the game was first demonstrated. Rockstar said in court that the incident cost the company $5 million and thousands of staff hours to recover, and prompted increased cybersecurity measures.

A 17-year-old boy from Oxfordshire—identified as "teapotuberhacker" and a key member of the group Lapsus$—was arrested by the City of London Police on 22 September as part of an investigation supported by the National Cyber Crime Unit and American federal law enforcement. (Note: Uber, breached by the same hacker the prior week, coordinated with the Federal Bureau of Investigation and the United States Department of Justice regarding the incidents.) While on bail for hacking EE and Nvidia and under police protection at a Travelodge hotel, he breached Rockstar using a mobile phone, television, and Fire TV Stick, and threatened to release the source code in a Slack message to all Rockstar staff. Appearing before a youth court, he pleaded guilty to breaching bail conditions and not guilty to computer misuse.

In mid-2023, he stood trial at Southwark Crown Court for twelve offences, including six counts of computer misuse, three of blackmail, and two of fraud. He was deemed unfit to stand trial due to his autism; a jury determined he had committed the acts, and a judge placed him under an indefinite hospital order in December for being a high public risk as he was violent in custody and expressed intent to continue committing cybercrimes. He was moved to a prison in July 2026, and pleaded guilty to hacking Rockstar and other companies in November.

==== 2025: "JustLovett0" and Benjamin Chue showreel ====
In January 2025, a Reddit user known as "JustLovett0" posted a photograph and two videos of a PlayStation 5 development kit running the game, taken at Rockstar San Diego in mid-2021. After the post was deleted, Polygon's Ian Walker wrote that it revealed no new information and called it the "worst leak of all time". In November, some development footage appeared in former Rockstar animator Benjamin Chue's showreel.

==== 2026: "CyberLeek" ====
The in-game map and several minutes of footage were leaked in August 2026 by an account known as "CyberLeek", who threatened to release more material unless plans were changed regarding special edition–only content and lack of discs. Journalists compared the demands to the Stop Killing Games movement, (Note: Stop Killing Games released a statement condemning the leak as "unacceptable", illegal, and counterproductive, urging its supporters not to send money to CyberLeek.) although some expressed concern that it was a cryptocurrency scam owing to a watermark on released video promoting their "$CYBERLEEK" meme coin. CyberLeek burned coins valued at more than US$1 million in response, claiming to raise money for a "secret project" to fight anti-consumer publishing practices.

Some footage suggested CyberLeek had a playable build of the game, with voting via paid tokens determining which clips leaked next; at least 16 videos were leaked over nine days by 26 August. Some leaked footage raised concerns about a possible graphical downgrade from the first trailer. Take-Two filed subpoena requests with Discord, Microsoft, and X Corp. in the US District Court for the Southern District of New York, seeking records to identify CyberLeek. Popular Grand Theft Auto streamer DarkViperAU's Discord server was among the few that were subpoenaed.

Rockstar publicly acknowledged the leaks on 26 August, calling them "heartbreaking for our team", and apologised for the delays in development and marketing. On 27 August, media reported that CyberLeek had withdrawn roughly $268,000 in transaction fees to four different crypto wallets hours ahead of the Netflix reveal, leading to a collapse in the value of the meme coin and speculation that the leaks had ended. In October, CyberLeek released further material, including gameplay videos depicting Jason and Lucia exploring the open world while nude. (Note: Attributed to multiple sources, including Polygon, Aftermath, IGN, and Kotaku) Nicole Carpenter of Aftermath noted the NPCs' lack of reaction to Jason's nudity in one of the videos, and surmised that CyberLeek was likely using a debug mode to create the videos rather than taking advantage of an intended feature. On 19 November, the date of the game's release, CyberLeek uploaded an Xbox build of the game via BitTorrent and threatened to release the main executable on 23 November or earlier if a crypto milestone is hit.

== Reception ==
Reception

Aggregate scores
Aggregator	Score
Metacritic	99/100 (Note: Based on 152 reviews on the PS5 version and 14 reviews on the Xbox Series X/S version)
OpenCritic	100% (Note: Based on 94 reviews)

Review scores
Publication	Score
Destructoid	10/10
Edge	10/10
Eurogamer	5/5
Game Informer	10/10
GameSpot	10/10
GamesRadar+	5/5
Giant Bomb	5/5
Hardcore Gamer	5/5
IGN	10/10
NME	5/5
Push Square	10/10
RPGamer	5/5
Shacknews	10/10
TechRadar	5/5
The Guardian	5/5
Video Games Chronicle	5/5

According to the review aggregator Metacritic, Grand Theft Auto VI received "universal acclaim" on critic reviews, with a score of 99 out of 100, becoming the site's best reviewed game among critics alongside The Legend of Zelda: Ocarina of Time (1998). (Note: Attributed to multiple sources, including Metacritic, GamesRadar+, Variety, and IGN) As of 2026, it is the only game of the 21st century to receive a 99 score on the site. OpenCritic assessed that 100% of critics recommend it. Critics praised the game's large variety of content, open world, story, characters, and expanding on elements from prior instalments in the series. Many referred to the game as a masterpiece.

In a review by Sam White for GQ, the state of Leonida is described as the "most technically and artistically impressive game world ever made". The game received The New York Times's "Critics Pick" designation, with Yussef Cole heavily praising Lucia and Jason's relationship as the main highlight, writing that the true achievement is "the well-earned satisfaction of an authentic human bond". Writing in The New Yorker, Julian Lucas praised the open world's "kinetic density" and reactive NPCs, arguing that "the culture-war frame is a distraction" from the game's visceral depiction of social and economic insecurity.

In a 5/5 review for The Guardian, Keza MacDonald praised the narrative's tonal shift to a more grounded, emotional stance, and commended how the female characters are given more depth compared to previous entries in the series. Alberto Lloret from Spanish HobbyConsolas qualified the game as "a colossal adventure in a vast world, overflowing with detail and so much content that you can finish the story without seeing much of it", and reviewed it with a 100/100 score, the first in the magazine's 35-year history. Russian Igromania review gave the game 10/10, noting "optional immersive mechanics, chemistry between Jason and Lucia, random events, an abundance of content" and "exceptional attention to detail".

Criticism has been directed at the frame rate cap of 30 frames per second, potentially awkward aiming controls, and a handful of missing features established in previous releases. In her review for ScreenHub, Alice Clark stated that "there are large sections where it is an absolutely epic game, and large sections that are boring and too limited". Meanwhile, Isabelle Maurel from Jeuxvideo.com rated the game 19/20, mentioning there were occasional frame-rate drops and formulaic gang hideouts.

The user score on Metacritic was drastically lower than the critic score following release, stabilising at around 5.6/10 by 21 November, which was a result of review bombing. Among those reviews include ones that are politically charged or admit they "haven't even played the game" themselves. Also impacting Grand Theft Auto VI's user score were fans of the 2026 remake of Ocarina of Time, who created new accounts to give Ocarina of Time a perfect score and Grand Theft Auto VI a zero, in an attempt to ensure that Ocarina of Time retained the user score record on Metacritic. The day after release saw a Metacritic user score as low as 3.7/10, before it rose to 5.0/10. Conversely, on the PlayStation Store and Microsoft Store—where reviews are restricted to verified purchasers—the title respectively maintained a rating of 4.84 out of 5 from approximately 170,000 user submissions and 4.9 out of 5.

=== Awards ===
Awards and nominations for Grand Theft Auto VI
Year	Award	Category	Result	Ref.
2024	Golden Joystick Awards	Most Wanted Game	Won	
2024	The Game Awards 2024	Most Anticipated Game	Won	
2025	Golden Joystick Awards	Best Game Trailer	Won	
2025	Golden Joystick Awards	Most Wanted Game	Won	
2025	The Game Awards 2025	Most Anticipated Game	Won	
2026	The Game Awards 2026	Game of the Year	Pending	
2026	The Game Awards 2026	Best Game Direction	Pending	
2026	The Game Awards 2026	Best Narrative	Pending	
2026	The Game Awards 2026	Best Art Direction	Pending	
2026	The Game Awards 2026	Best Score & Music	Pending	
2026	The Game Awards 2026	Best Audio Design	Pending	
2026	The Game Awards 2026	Best Action/Adventure Game	Pending	
2026	The Game Awards 2026	Best Performance (Manni L. Perez as Lucia Caminos)	Pending	

== Sales ==
Grand Theft Auto VI sold 32.5 million copies before its release, becoming the 30th best-selling game of all time solely on preorder sales. The digital analytics platform Sensor Tower estimated that it had sold 24.58 million preorder copies from digital storefronts, equating to an approximate revenue of US$2.36 billion. This made it the most preordered video game of all time, surpassing the previous record of 8 million copies held by Cyberpunk 2077. Approximately 75% of preorders were made for PlayStation 5, while the remaining 25% were for Xbox Series X/S. The game generated US$3.79 billion within 24 hours of its release, making it the largest entertainment product launch in history, exceeding the box office of the highest-grossing film, Avengers: Endgame, by nearly $1 billion. It broke the previous launch-day entertainment sales record set by its predecessor Grand Theft Auto V, which generated US$815.7 million in 2013.
