= Grand Theft Auto: Vice City =

2002 video game

- Developer: Rockstar North (Note: Ported to Xbox by Rockstar Vienna. 10th Anniversary Edition developed by War Drum Studios.)
- Publisher: Rockstar Games
- Producer: Leslie Benzies
- Programmers: Obbe Vermeij; Adam Fowler; Alexander Roger
- Artist: Aaron Garbut
- Writers: Dan Houser; James Worrall
- Composer: Lex Horton
- Series: Grand Theft Auto
- Engine: RenderWare
- Platforms: PlayStation 2: Windows; Xbox; Mac OS X; iOS; Android; Fire OS
- Release: 29 October 2002: PlayStation 2; NA: 29 October 2002; EU: 8 November 2002; Windows; NA: 13 May 2003; EU: 16 May 2003; Xbox; NA: 4 November 2003; EU: 2 January 2004; Mac OS X; WW: 12 November 2010; iOS; WW: 6 December 2012; Android; WW: 12 December 2012; Fire OS; WW: 15 May 2014
- Genre: Action-adventure
- Mode: Single-player

Grand Theft Auto: Vice City is a 2002 action-adventure game developed by Rockstar North and published by Rockstar Games. It is the fourth main game in the Grand Theft Auto series, following 2001's Grand Theft Auto III, and the sixth entry overall. Set in 1986 within the fictional Vice City (based on Miami), the single-player story follows gangster Tommy Vercetti's rise to power after being released from prison and becoming caught up in an ambushed drug deal. While seeking out those responsible, Tommy gradually builds a criminal empire by seizing power from other criminal organisations.

The game is played from a third-person perspective and its world is navigated on foot or by vehicle. The open world design lets the player freely roam Vice City, consisting of two main islands. The game's plot is based on multiple real-world people and events in Miami such as Cubans, Haitians, and biker gangs, the 1980s crack epidemic, the Mafioso drug lords of Miami, and the dominance of glam metal. The game was also influenced by the films and television of the era, most notably Scarface (1983) and Miami Vice (1984–1990). Much of the development work constituted creating the game world to fit the inspiration and time period; the development team conducted extensive field research in Miami while creating the world. The game was released in October 2002 for the PlayStation 2.

Vice City received critical acclaim, with praise directed at its music, gameplay, story, and open world design, though it generated controversy over its depiction of violence and racial groups. It received year-end accolades from several gaming publications, and it is considered one of the sixth generation of console gaming's most significant titles and among the best video games ever made. Vice City became the best-selling game of 2002 and one of the best-selling PlayStation 2 games with over 14.2 million copies sold; it has sold over 17.5 million copies overall. It was released for Windows and the Xbox in 2003, followed by enhanced versions and mobile ports in the 2010s and a remastered version in 2021. It was followed by Grand Theft Auto: San Andreas (2004) and a prequel, Vice City Stories (2006).

== Gameplay ==
Grand Theft Auto: Vice City is an action-adventure game played from a third-person perspective. The player controls mobster Tommy Vercetti and completes missions—linear scenarios with set objectives—to progress through the story. It is possible to have several missions available at a time, as some missions require the player to wait for further instructions or events. Outside of missions, the player can freely roam the game's open world and has the ability to complete optional side missions. Composed of two main islands and several smaller areas, the world is much larger in area than earlier entries in the series. (Note: Art director Aaron Garbut stated that the area of Vice City is almost twice as large as Grand Theft Auto III's Liberty City, estimating it at over 4.25 square kilometres (1.64 sq mi).) The islands are unlocked for the player as the story progresses.

The player can ride motorcycles in Vice City, unlike in its predecessor.

The player may run, jump, or drive vehicles to navigate the game's world. The player uses melee attacks, firearms and explosives to fight enemies. The firearms include weapons such as the Colt Python, an M60 machine gun and a minigun. The game's three-dimension environment allows a first-person view while aiming with the sniper rifle and rocket launcher. In addition, the game's combat allows the player to commit drive-by shootings by facing sideways in a vehicle. A wide variety of weapon options can be purchased from local firearms dealers, found on the ground, retrieved from dead enemies, or found around the city.

In combat, auto-aim can be used as assistance against enemies. Should the player take damage, their health meter can be fully regenerated through the use of health pick-ups. Body armour pickups can be used to absorb gunshots and explosive damage, but is used up in the process. When health is entirely depleted, gameplay stops and the player respawns at the nearest hospital while losing all weapons and armour and some of their money. If the player commits crimes while playing, the game's law enforcement agencies may respond as indicated by a "wanted" meter in the head-up display (HUD), which increases as the player commits more crimes. On the meter, the displayed stars indicate the current wanted level, and the higher the level, the greater the response for law enforcement (for example, at the maximum six-star level, police helicopters and the military swarm to lethally dispatch players).

During the story, Tommy meets characters from various gangs. As the player completes missions for different gangs, fellow gang members will often defend the player, while rival gang members will recognise the player and subsequently shoot on sight. While free roaming the game world, the player may engage in activities such as a vigilante minigame, a firefighting activity, a paramedic service and a taxi service. Completion of these activities grants the player with context-specific rewards. As Tommy builds his criminal empire, the player may purchase a number of properties distributed across the city, some of which act as additional hideouts where weapons can be collected and vehicles can be stored. There are also a variety of businesses which can be purchased, including a pornographic film studio, a taxi company, and several entertainment clubs. Each commercial property has a number of missions attached to it, such as eliminating competition or stealing equipment; once all missions are complete, the property begins to generate an ongoing income available for the player.

== Plot ==
In 1986, gangster Tommy Vercetti (voiced by Ray Liotta) is released from prison after serving a fifteen-year sentence for murder. His boss, Sonny Forelli (Tom Sizemore), seeking to establish drug operations in the south, sends Tommy to Vice City, Florida, to oversee an important drug deal alongside crooked lawyer Ken Rosenberg (William Fichtner). However, the deal is ambushed, with Tommy and Ken barely escaping. An infuriated Sonny orders Tommy to recover the drugs, alongside the money Sonny gave to him, under threat of consequences. Seeking information, Ken points Tommy towards retired army colonel Juan Garcia Cortez (Robert Davi), who helped set up the exchange. Expressing regret for the ambush, Cortez promises to find out who masterminded it. Cortez also serves as a mentor to Tommy, encouraging him to act increasingly independent of Sonny and the Forelli family.

While investigating, Tommy meets various contacts who offer him aid, including band manager Kent Paul (Danny Dyer), who maintains connections with the city's criminal underworld; freelancer Lance Vance (Philip Michael Thomas), who aided in the deal and lost his brother in the ambush; and Texan business tycoon Avery Carrington (Burt Reynolds), who enlists Tommy's help with several deals. Cortez also puts Tommy in contact with drug lord Ricardo Diaz (Luis Guzmán), who employs him and Lance, but soon voices his suspicions that Diaz organised the ambush. Upon further investigation, Lance discovers this to be the case and, against Tommy's advice, tries to kill Diaz, only to get himself captured. After Tommy saves Lance, they invade Diaz's mansion and kill him.

With Diaz dead, Tommy takes over his assets and, at Avery's suggestion, works to expand his new criminal empire by forcing businesses to pay him protection money and buying out nearly bankrupt companies to use as fronts for illicit operations. Tommy establishes his own gang to protect his businesses from rivals, and provides assistance to several prominent gang leaders in the hopes they will support his expansion. Meanwhile, Cortez is forced to leave Vice City after being tracked down by agents of the French government. Tommy helps the colonel fend off an attack on his yacht as it departs the city, and Cortez trusts Tommy to look after his daughter, Mercedes (Fairuza Balk).

Eventually, Sonny discovers that Tommy has gained complete control over Vice City's drug trade without cutting the Forellis in. Enraged at Tommy's independence, he sends mobsters to forcefully collect money from his businesses, but Tommy defends them and kills Sonny's men, severing his last ties with the Forelli family. When Sonny flies to Vice City himself to collect what he believes he is owed, Tommy arranges a meeting at his mansion, planning to pay in counterfeit money. During the meeting, Tommy accuses Sonny of orchestrating the attack that led to his arrest fifteen years prior, and Sonny reveals that Lance has betrayed Tommy and informed the Forellis of his plot, having felt inadequate in Tommy's presence since his rise to power. A shootout ensues, during which Tommy defends his money from the Forellis and kills both Lance and Sonny. With the Forelli family destroyed, no one remains to stand in Tommy's way, and he and Ken optimistically discuss Tommy's status as the undisputed ruler of Vice City.

== Development ==
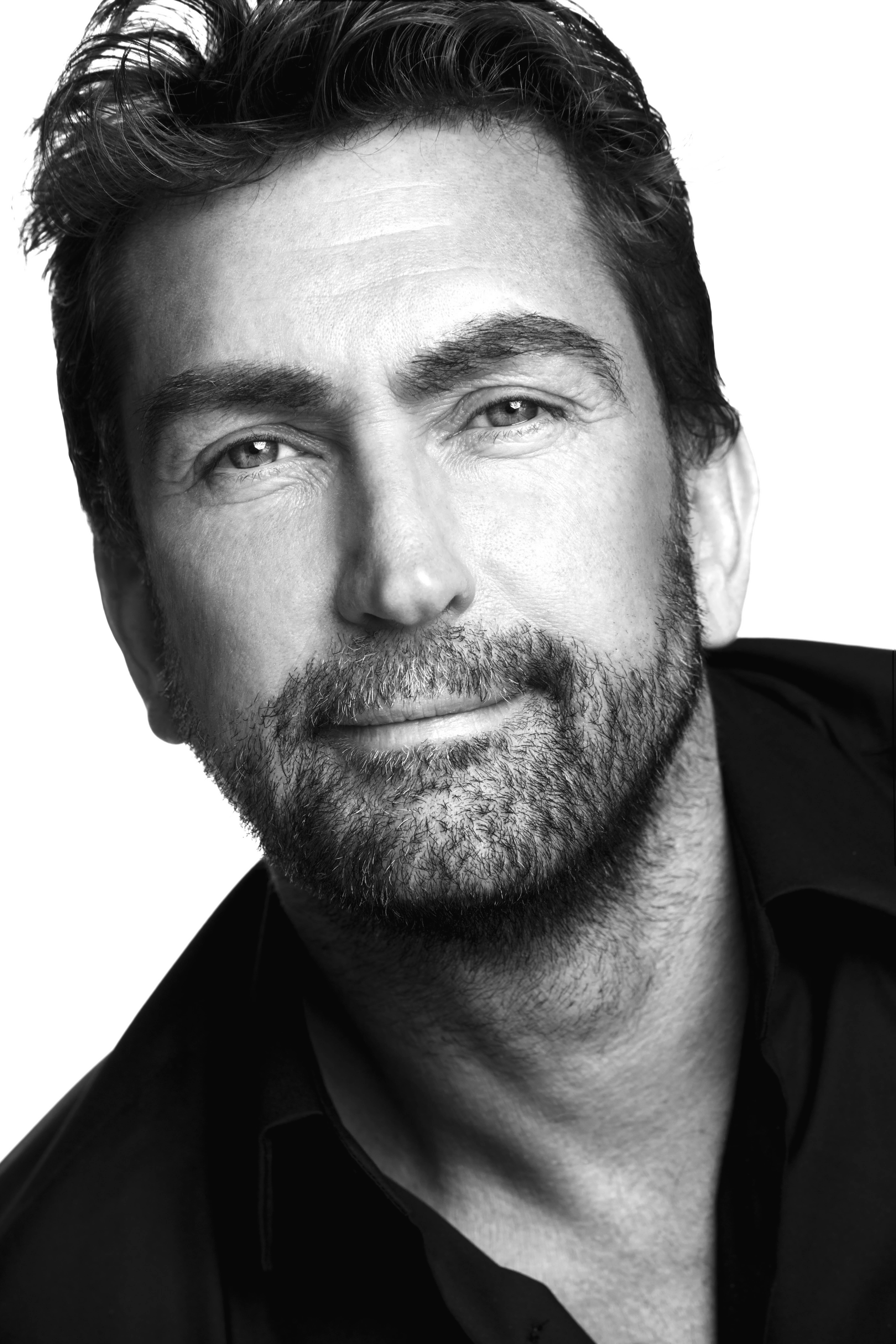
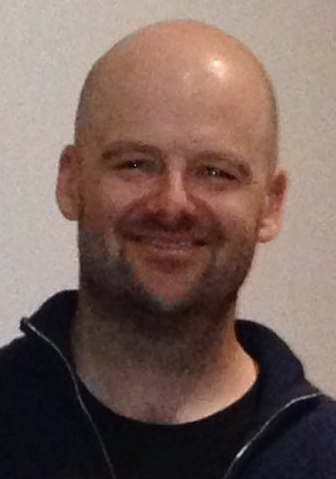
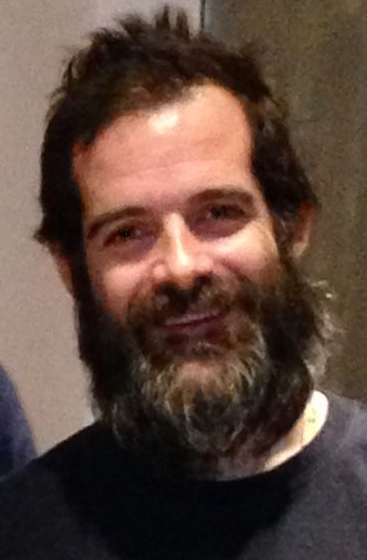
Leslie Benzies (left) produced the game alongside Dan Houser (centre), who also co-wrote the story. Sam Houser (right), president of Rockstar Games, executive-produced the game.

Rockstar North's core 50-person team led the eighteen-month development of Grand Theft Auto: Vice City. Full production began in late 2001, as Grand Theft Auto III was nearing completion. While early development only involved creating 3D models, executive producer Sam Houser said "it really kicked off at the beginning of 2002" and lasted about nine months. After the release of the Windows version of Grand Theft Auto III, the development team discussed creating a mission pack for the game that would have added new weapons, vehicles, and missions. Upon further discussion, the team decided to adapt this concept into a stand-alone game, which became Vice City.

The game was announced at the Electronic Entertainment Expo on 22 May 2002. It was Rockstar North's most expensive game at the time, with a development budget of US$5 million and marketing budget of US$13.2 million. On 5 September 2002, Rockstar announced the release date of 22 October had been postponed until 29 October to meet product demand. By 15 October, development of Vice City stopped as the game was submitted for manufacturing. It was released for the PlayStation 2 on 29 October in North America, and on 8 November in Europe. Capcom published the game in Japan on 20 May 2004 for PlayStation 2 and Windows. The game was added to the Rockstar Games Launcher in September 2019.

=== Setting ===
The game is set in 1986 in fictional Vice City, which is based heavily on the city of Miami, Florida. Vice City previously appeared in the original Grand Theft Auto (1997); the development team decided to reuse the location and incorporate ideas from within the studio and from the fanbase. They wanted to satirise a location that was not contemporary, in contrast to Grand Theft Auto III's modern-day Liberty City. The team wanted to choose a location that had similarities and differences to New York City—the inspiration of Liberty City—eventually leading them to Miami, which producer Leslie Benzies described as "a party town, all sun and sea and sex, but with that same dark edge underneath". Sam Houser called it "the grooviest era of crime because it didn't even feel like it was crime ... it was a totally topsy-turvy back-to-front period of time". The team intended to make Vice City a "living, breathing city" so the player would feel like "life still goes on" while their character was inside a building.

The game's look, particularly the clothing and vehicles, reflects its 1980s setting. Many themes were borrowed from the crime films Scarface (1983) and Carlito's Way (1993), the latter for its characterisation of nuanced criminals. The television series Miami Vice (1984–1989) was also a major influence and was regularly watched by the team throughout development. Art director Aaron Garbut used the series as a reference point for emulating neon lighting. In recreating a 1980s setting, the team found it "relatively painless" due to the distinct culture of the time period and the team's familiarity with the era. The art team was provided with large volumes of research, as well as reference photographs taken by other members of the development team. The team organised field research trips to Miami shortly after completing the development of Grand Theft Auto III, splitting into small teams and observing the streets.

=== Story and characters ===
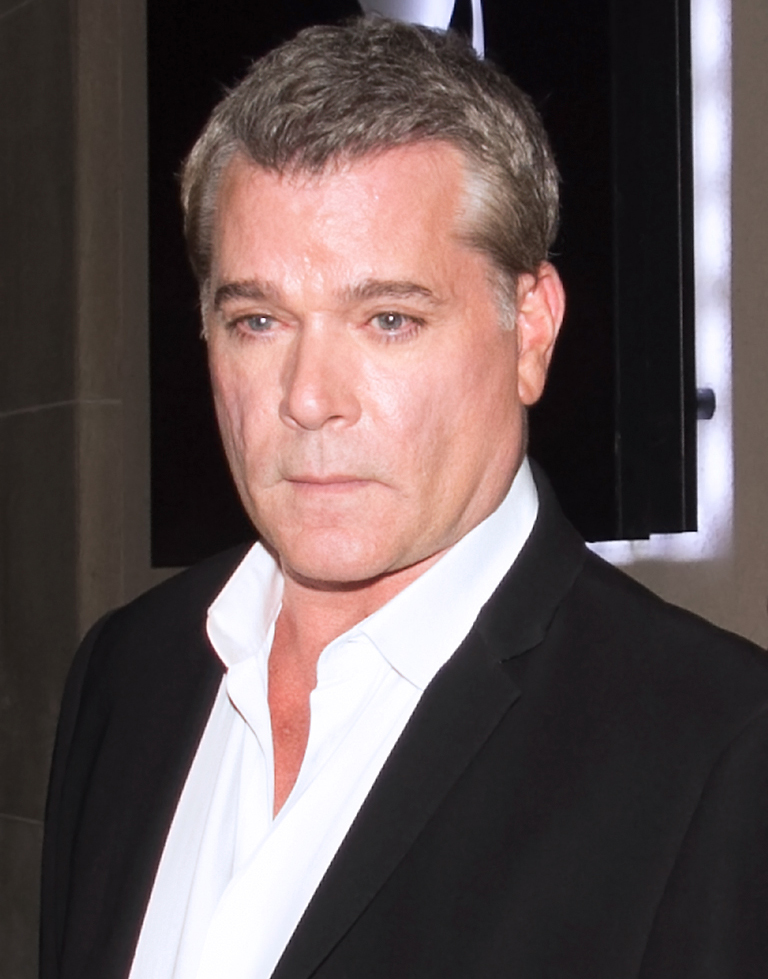
Ray Liotta voiced protagonist Tommy Vercetti.

The team spent time "solving [the] riddle" of a speaking protagonist, a notable departure from Grand Theft Auto III's silent protagonist Claude. Ray Liotta portrayed protagonist Tommy Vercetti and described the role as challenging: "You're creating a character that's not there before ... It's so intensive". While recording his voice, the team captured his physical performance against a blue screen to get a sense of how to visualise the cutscenes. The team strove to make the player feel a "real affinity" for Tommy by prioritising the game's narrative. Dan Houser described Tommy as "strong and dangerous and prepared to wait for the right opportunity to arrive". Director Navid Khonsari found Liotta occasionally difficult to work with. Sam Houser said, "In some sessions he was ... into it, but then sometimes ... he was very dark and couldn't work".

The majority of the game's animations were original, with only a few borrowed from Grand Theft Auto III. For the characters, the team used motion capture and stop motion animation techniques; cutscenes use the former, while gameplay movements use a combination of both techniques. The team encountered difficulty in animating motorcycle animations, due in part to the variety of models. Pedestrian character models use skins in Vice City, which allowed the artists to produce more realistic characters. There are 110 unique pedestrian models throughout the game world alongside roughly 50 story characters; each character is rendered using twice the amount of polygons and textures compared to Grand Theft Auto III. The increased polygons also impacted the character physics, improving gameplay aspects such as weapon-hit accuracy. Some character models and storylines were inspired by films such as The Godfather (1972), and the game's presentation was inspired by action television shows of the 1980s. The interplay between Tommy Vercetti and Lance Vance was intended to mimic that of Miami Vice's James "Sonny" Crockett and Ricardo Tubbs.

=== Sound design and music production ===
The game features 8,000 lines of recorded dialogue, four times the amount in Grand Theft Auto III. It contains over 90 minutes of cutscenes and nine hours of music, with more than 113 songs and commercials. The team enjoyed the challenge of creating the game's soundtrack, particularly in contrast to Grand Theft Auto III's music, which Sam Houser described as "clearly satirical and its own thing". In developing the radio stations, the team wanted to reinforce the game's setting by curating a variety of songs from the 1980s, which required extensive research. The radio stations were published by Epic Records on seven albums—known collectively as Grand Theft Auto: Vice City Official Soundtrack Box Set—alongside the game in October 2002. Vice City contains about three times as much talk radio as Grand Theft Auto III. The developers emphasised the extremity of the callers' personalities, drawing from the experiences of producer and talk show host Lazlow Jones. Dan Houser felt the talk stations gave depth to the game world.

== Reception ==
=== Critical response ===
PlayStation 2 version reception

Aggregate score
Aggregator	Score
Metacritic	95/100

Review scores
Publication	Score
AllGame	5/5
Edge	8/10
Eurogamer	10/10
Game Informer	10/10
GameRevolution	A
GameSpot	9.6/10
GameSpy	95/100
IGN	9.7/10

Grand Theft Auto: Vice City was released to critical acclaim. Metacritic calculated an average score of 95 out of 100, indicating "universal acclaim", based on 62 reviews. It is Metacritic's highest-rated PlayStation 2 game of 2002, and the fifth-highest rated PlayStation 2 game overall, tied with a number of others. (Note: Grand Theft Auto: Vice City shares its status as the fifth-highest rated PlayStation 2 game on Metacritic with Grand Theft Auto: San Andreas, Gran Turismo 3: A-Spec and Madden NFL 2003. The PlayStation 2 games that are rated higher than Vice City are Tony Hawk's Pro Skater 3, Grand Theft Auto III, Resident Evil 4 and Metal Gear Solid 2: Sons of Liberty.) Reviewers liked the game's sound and music, open-ended gameplay, and open world design, though some criticism was directed at the controls and technical issues. IGN's Douglass Perry declared it "one of the most impressive games of 2002", and GameSpy's Raymond Padilla named the experience "deep, devilishly enjoyable, and unique".

Reviewers generally considered the missions an improvement over Grand Theft Auto III, although some noted occasional awkwardness and frustration. IGN's Perry wrote that the game's missions give the player "a stronger feeling of being inside a story within a world that truly exists". Game Informer's Matt Helgeson found the missions to be more complex, and AllGame's Scott Alan Marriott felt that the storyline was improved as a result. Marriott also found the lead character of Tommy to be more engaging than Grand Theft Auto III's Claude; IGN's Perry felt that Rockstar "found the right person and the right choice", and Edge wrote that Tommy "sweats charisma", commending Ray Liotta's performance.

Reviewers praised the design and detail of Vice City, noting it felt more alive than Grand Theft Auto III's Liberty City.

The game's open world design was praised by reviewers, many of whom felt that it contained more detail and felt more alive than its predecessors. GameSpy's Padilla made favourable comparisons between Vice City and Grand Theft Auto III's Liberty City, noting the former's level of detail. Game Revolution's Ben Silverman wrote that the game's depth is "unparalleled", praising the world's realism and detail, while AllGame's Marriott commended the "ambitious scope in design".

Marriott of AllGame named Vice City an "unforgettable listening experience", and Perry of IGN declared the music as "the most impressive list of songs in a game". Many reviewers commended the game's radio stations and talk radio, and felt that the game's collection of licensed 1980s music fit the tone and time period of the world. The voice acting also received praise; GameSpot's Jeff Gerstmann named the cast of characters "colorful and memorable", and IGN's Perry found the voice acting "one of the best of its kind". Game Revolution's Silverman felt that the acting "gives the story credence".

Many reviewers found that the game offers a better variety of vehicles than Grand Theft Auto III, and found them easier to control; GameSpot's Gerstmann named the driving "more exciting and dangerous", and IGN's Perry found the motorcycle's controls pleasing. In addition to the vehicle handling, reviewers noted improvements in the targeting and shooting mechanics, although still recognised issues. Helgeson of Game Informer wrote that "targeting is improved to the point where combat can actually be fun".

Some reviewers recognised an improved draw distance over Grand Theft Auto III, although many identified frame rate drops during hardware-intense sequences. The changes in character models polarised reviews; while GameSpy's Padilla and IGN's Perry noted the improvement in character models, Eurogamer's Tom Bramwell considered it "maddening to see that character ... models haven't been smartened up at all". The game's artificial intelligence and long load times were frequently criticised in reviews, and many reviewers noted the awkward camera angles and environment during gameplay.

==== Windows version ====
Windows version reception

Aggregate score
Aggregator	Score
Metacritic	94/100

Review scores
Publication	Score
AllGame	5/5
Eurogamer	9/10
GameSpot	9.6/10
GameSpy	93/100
IGN	9.3/10
X-Play	5/5

When Vice City was released to Windows in May 2003, it received similar critical acclaim. Metacritic calculated an average score of 94 out of 100, indicating "universal acclaim", based on 30 reviews. It was the highest-rated Windows game on Metacritic in 2003. Reviewers liked the visual enhancements, and were generally positive towards the control improvements.

The port's visuals received a positive response from reviewers. AllGame's Mark Hoogland praised the improved car details, environment textures, and weather effects; GameSpot's Greg Kasavin echoed similar remarks, noting occasional frame rate drops. GameSpy's Sal Accardo commended the draw distance improvements, identifying very few texture issues. IGN's Steve Butts found the port's system requirements to be reasonable, unlike Grand Theft Auto III, and praised the faster load times. Eurogamer's Martin Taylor was critical of the visuals, stating that the higher resolutions "aren't kind to the overall visual quality", and criticising the hardware requirements.

The control changes of the port were generally well received. Most reviewers found the targeting and shooting mechanics to be improved with mouse and keyboard controls; Eurogamer's Taylor called them "far more fluid", and GameSpy's Accardo wrote "there's simply no substitute for aiming with a mouse". However, the driving control changes were widely criticised; IGN's Butts called it "crap". AllGame's Hoogland found the controls to be "more forgiving" over time.

==== Mobile version ====
Mobile version reception

Aggregate score
Aggregator	Score
Metacritic	80/100

Review scores
Publication	Score
Destructoid	7.5/10
IGN	7.7/10
Pocket Gamer	8/10
TouchArcade	4.5/5
Digital Spy	3/5
NowGamer	7/10
The Telegraph	4/5

When Vice City was released on mobile devices in December 2012, it received "generally favorable" reviews. Metacritic calculated an average score of 80 out of 100, based on 19 reviews. Reviewers liked the enhanced visuals, but criticism was directed at the touchscreen controls.

The port's visuals were well received. Destructoid's Chris Carter felt that they "[suit] the neon and bright pastel veneer", and wrote that the "new lighting effects and smoothed-out engine really allow the game to pop like it never has before". IGN's Justin Davis praised the updated character models, lighting, and textures, and Touch Arcade's Eric Ford noted that the "visuals are improved but not in a drastic manner". NowGamer found that the mobile display improves the visual enjoyment of the game, despite the issues with the original game. Tom Hoggins of The Telegraph identified some issues with character models, but stated "the city looks terrific".

Most reviewers criticised the port's touchscreen controls. Pocket Gamer's Mark Brown found them "not ideal", but noted that this was also the case in the original game, while Digital Spy's Scott Nichols felt that the game "only complicated [the controls] further". IGN's Davis was thankful for the addition of customisable controls, and wrote that they "make the experience much more controllable", and Touch Arcade's Ford greatly appreciated the developer's efforts to "make the situation bearable". Destructoid's Carter spoke favourably of the controls, despite noting awkward character movement, while The Telegraph's Hoggins found the controls "far more accomplished" than Grand Theft Auto III's mobile port.

=== Accolades ===
Grand Theft Auto: Vice City received multiple nominations and awards from gaming publications. It was nominated for six awards at the 6th Annual Interactive Achievement Awards, of which it won Console Action/Adventure Game of the Year; it was nominated for Computer Action/Adventure Game of the Year the following year. It led the 1st British Academy Games Awards with eight nominations and six awards, including PlayStation 2 Game, PC Game, Action Game, Design, and Sound. It was similarly named the Best PlayStation 2 game at the Golden Joystick Awards and from Entertainment Weekly, IGN, and GameSpot, and was awarded the prestigious Ultimate Game of the Year at the Golden Joystick Awards. GameSpot awarded it Best Action/Adventure Game, Best Music, and Best Graphics (Technical and Artistic). IGN awarded it Best Action/Adventure Game, and it was the runner-up for Reader's Choice Overall Game of the Year.

== Sales ==
Within 24 hours of its release, Grand Theft Auto: Vice City sold over 500,000 copies. Within two days of its release, it sold 1.4 million copies, making it the fastest-selling game in history at the time. It was the highest-selling game of 2002 in the United States; by 2004, the game had sold 5.97 million units, and by December 2007 it had sold 8.20 million. In July 2006, Next Generation ranked it as the highest-selling game launched for the PlayStation 2, GameCube, or Xbox between January 2000 and July 2006 in the United States, with an estimated 7 million copies sold and US$300 million in revenue. In February 2005, it was re-released as part of PlayStation's Greatest Hits selection, indicating high sales. In Japan, Vice City sold about 223,000 copies in its first week and over 410,000 by January 2008. The game earned a "Diamond" award in the United Kingdom, indicating over one million sales. Grand Theft Auto: Double Pack—a bundle containing Grand Theft Auto III and Vice City—became one of the best-selling Xbox games with over 1.59 million copies sold in the United States and over 1.25 million in Japan. Vice City was one of the PlayStation 2's best-selling games with 14.2 million copies sold, and across all platforms it sold 17.5 million units by March 2008.

== Controversies ==
Similar to its predecessors, Vice City was labelled violent and explicit and considered controversial by many advocacy groups. Peter Hartlaub of SFGate noted the game's "mindless violence", but attributed it to the developers' attempt to achieve accuracy. Jeremy Pope, who worked on various Rockstar games including Vice City, vowed never to work on violent games again due to their portrayal in mainstream media. In Australia, the game was pre-edited to receive an MA15+ classification; an uncensored version was released in the region in 2010, retaining its classification.

The game allows the player to fight immigrant gangs made up of Haitians (pictured) and Cubans, and missions involve fighting both gangs. Civil rights organisations accused the game of inviting ethnic violence, and of featuring discriminatory phrases.

In November 2003, the Haitian Centers Council and Haitian Americans for Human Rights staged a protest in New York City publicly criticising the game, contending that it invited the player to harm Haitian immigrants and claiming that it depicted Haitians as "thugs, thieves and drug dealers". In response, Rockstar issued a press release apologising and acknowledging the concern, but insisted that the violence should be taken within the context of the game, which also contains violence towards other ethnic groups. When New York City mayor Michael Bloomberg threatened distributor Take-Two Interactive with legal action, the company apologised and removed offensive statements from future copies of the game. In January 2004, North Miami's majority Haitian-American council filed an ordinance to ban the selling or renting of violent games to anyone under 18 without parental permission. The proposal, apparently sparked by Vice City, was supported by North Miami mayor Josaphat Celestin, who stated "We don't believe the First Amendment was written to protect those who want to incite violence". The case was later downgraded from federal court to state court.

On 7 June 2003, 18-year-old Devin Moore shot and killed two Alabamian police officers and a dispatcher before fleeing in a patrol car; he was later apprehended. In statements to police, Moore reportedly said "Life is like a video game. Everybody's got to die sometime". A $600 million lawsuit was filed against Rockstar Games, Take-Two Interactive, Sony Computer Entertainment, GameStop, and Wal-Mart, claiming that Moore frequently played Vice City and that his experience with the game led him to commit the crimes. The plaintiffs' attorney, Jack Thompson, claimed the graphic nature of the game caused Moore to commit the murders. Thompson removed himself from the case Strickland v. Sony in November 2005 after being scrutinised by the judge for unprofessional conduct. In March 2006, the Supreme Court rejected an appeal by the defendants to dismiss the case.

In September 2006, Thompson brought another $600 million lawsuit against Cody Posey, Rockstar Games, Take-Two Interactive, and Sony Computer Entertainment. The lawsuit claimed that 14-year-old Posey played the game obsessively before murdering his father, stepmother, and stepsister on a ranch in Hondo, New Mexico. Posey's defence team argued that he was abused by his father and was taking Sertraline at the time of the killings. The suit alleged that the murders would not have taken place if Posey had not obsessively played Vice City. The case was dismissed in December 2007, as New Mexico held no jurisdiction over Sony or Take-Two.

In July 2017, the Psychic Readers Network (PRN) sued Rockstar over the character named Auntie Poulet, alleging similarities between the character and Youree Harris, who voiced the character. Brandon J. Huffman, a lawyer for Odin Law and Media, noted that PRN's lawsuit faced challenges due to the timing of the lawsuit, as the Eleventh Circuit's statute of limitations for copyright infringement is three years; the lawsuit was filed almost 15 years after the game's release. Huffman added that Take-Two could also claim parody or settle out of court, but that it was unlikely to do either initially.

== Legacy ==
Mike Snider of USA Today wrote that Vice City "raised the bar for video games", citing its interactivity, violence, and soundtrack. Kotaku's Luke Plunkett and PC Magazine's Jeffrey L. Wilson both named Vice City the best game in the series, with the former naming it the "perfect Grand Theft Auto experience". The readers of Official UK PlayStation Magazine named Vice City the fourth-greatest PlayStation title ever released. In 2006 Vice City appeared on Japanese magazine Famitsu's readers' list of top 100 games; it was one of the only Western titles on the list. Art director Aaron Garbut felt that, alongside its predecessor Grand Theft Auto III and successor San Andreas, Vice City led the trend of open world games. A new rendition of Vice City returned in Grand Theft Auto VI (2026).

=== Ports ===
Grand Theft Auto: Vice City was released for Windows on 13 May 2003 in North America and 16 May in Europe, supporting higher screen resolutions and draw distance, and featuring more detailed textures. Vice City was bundled with Grand Theft Auto III in a compilation titled Grand Theft Auto: Double Pack, released on the Xbox on 4 November 2003 in North America and 2 January 2004 in Europe. The Xbox version featured a custom soundtrack support as well as improved audio, polygon models, and reflections over the previous ports. Double Pack was later bundled with San Andreas in a compilation titled Grand Theft Auto: The Trilogy, released in October 2005. Analysts believed that the game would eventually release on GameCube, though it never materialised. The Trilogy was also released for OS X on 12 November 2010.

For its tenth anniversary in 2012, Vice City was ported to mobile devices by War Drum Studios, building on the Windows version with enhanced visuals and a customisable layout. It was released for iOS devices on 6 December, for Android on 12 December following a delay due to technical issues, and for Fire OS on 15 May 2014. An emulated version of Vice City was released on the PlayStation 3 on 30 January 2013 via the PlayStation Network's PS2 Classics; another emulated version was released for the PlayStation 4 on 5 December 2015, upscaled to 1080p and with support for Trophies. A remastered version of The Trilogy, subtitled The Definitive Edition, was released for the Nintendo Switch, PlayStation 4, PlayStation 5, Windows, Xbox One, and Xbox Series X/S on 11 November 2021, and for Android and iOS on 14 December 2023. The original game was removed from digital retailers in preparation for The Definitive Edition, but later restored as a bundle on the Rockstar Store.

A core team of six fans reverse-engineered the game and released it as an executable in December 2020, having worked on it since May; titled reVC, the project allows the game to be unofficially ported to platforms such as the Nintendo Switch, PlayStation Vita, and Wii U. Take-Two issued a DMCA takedown for the project in February 2021. In April, Theo, a New Zealand-based developer who maintained a fork of the source code, filed a counter-notice on GitHub, claiming that the code does not contain any original work owned by Take-Two; per DMCA rules regarding disputes, Theo's content was restored after two weeks. On 10 June 2021, the team behind reVC filed a counter-notice; per DMCA rules regarding disputes, the source code was restored after two weeks. In September 2021, Take-Two filed a lawsuit in California against the programmers, asserting that the projects constitute copyright infringement.

A team of Russian modders released an unofficial port of the game, subtitled "NextGen Edition", using Grand Theft Auto IV's engine in January 2025, aiming to address perceived issues with The Definitive Edition. A DMCA complaint by Take-Two resulted in the deletion of the mod's trailer and YouTube channel, though some journalists noted the 2022 decree protecting Russian companies from copyright enforcement by Western firms (as a result of the Russian invasion of Ukraine) may shield the mod and team from legal action by Take-Two. Vice City's technical director, Obbe Vermeij, defended Take-Two's decision, opining that the mod "directly competes" with The Definitive Edition, though he acknowledged the takedown "would be easier to swallow if [Rockstar] produced competent re-masters".
