= Bury the Bride =

- Directed by: Spider One
- Written by: Spider One; Krsy Fox
- Produced by: Ashok Amritraj; Jack Ferry; Jude Harris; Scotty Landes; Van Toffler; Cody Zwieg
- Starring: Krsy Fox; Scout Taylor-Compton; Dylan Rourke; Lyndsi LaRose; Chaz Bono; Cameron Cowperthwaite; Rachel Brunner; Katie Ryan; Adam Marcinowski
- Cinematography: Andy Patch
- Edited by: Krsy Fox
- Music by: Michelle Carter; Tyler Connolly; Krsy Fox; Paul Wiley
- Production company: OneFox Productions
- Distributed by: Tubi Film
- Release dates: 15 April 2023 (Panic Fest); 22 April 2023 (Tubi)
- Running time: 83 minutes
- Country: United States
- Language: English

Bury the Bride is a 2023 American horror film directed by Spider One, starring Krsy Fox, Scout Taylor-Compton, Dylan Rourke, Lyndsi LaRose, Chaz Bono and Cameron Cowperthwaite.

== Cast ==
- Krsy Fox as Sadie
- Scout Taylor-Compton as June
- Dylan Rourke as David
- Lyndsi LaRose as Carmen
- Chaz Bono as Puppy
- Cameron Cowperthwaite as Bobby
- Rachel Brunner as Liz
- Katie Ryan as Betty
- Adam Marcinowski as Mike

== Release ==
The film premiered at Panic Fest on 15 April 2023. It was released on Tubi on 22 April.

== Reception ==
Jacob Davison of iHorror gave the film a score of 4/5 and wrote that it "makes the most of its characters and setting to make a truly fun and entertaining bridal horror movie that takes you for a loop."

Meredith Jill Brown of Dread Central rated the film 4 stars out of 5 and wrote: "The gore is intense, harsh, and ruthless. In a similar fashion as his first full-length feature Allegoria, Spider One doesn’t allow you more than a brief moment to catch your breath before the REAL hunt begins."

Jenn Adams of Rue Morgue praised the "smart and funny" script, the twist and the performances.
