= Manni L. Perez =

American actress (born 1992)

- Born: September 7, 1992 (age 34); New York City, New York, U.S.
- Citizenship: American
- Education: Tisch School of the Arts
- Occupation: Actress
- Years active: 2013–present

Instagram information
- Page: mannilperez
- Followers: 604 thousand
- Last updated: November 22, 2026

Manni L. Perez (born September 7, 1992) is an American actress and weightlifter. She portrayed Lucia Caminos in the video game Grand Theft Auto VI (2026). She also portrayed Tina in the Marvel Cinematic Universe.

== Early and personal life ==
Born on September 7, 1992, in New York City, Perez is of Dominican and Puerto Rican descent. She initially attended SUNY Orange before pursuing acting studies at New York University's Tisch School of the Arts. She also worked professionally as a belly dancer. Perez practices several martial arts and combat sports, including mixed martial arts, Muay Thai, and Brazilian jiu-jitsu.

During an April 2021 appearance focused on Latinx and LGBTQ+ representation, Perez discussed her gender dysphoria publicly for the first time, though she has not publicly identified herself as LGBTQ+. She explained that she experienced gender dysphoria despite presenting as female and was actively working through it, while also expressing her view of gender as fluid. She also reflected on her Catholic upbringing and experiences at Christian camps, discussing how those environments had led her to conceal aspects of her identity during her younger years.

== Career ==
Perez began her career as a professional belly dancer before pursuing acting on the recommendation of a professor at SUNY Orange. She later appeared in the television reboot of the 1986 film She's Gotta Have It, followed by guest roles in several television series, including Law & Order: Special Victims Unit, Chicago P.D., The Blacklist, and Blindspot.

In 2019, Perez was cast by Rockstar Games to voice a blackjack dealer in Grand Theft Auto Online. In November 2026, Perez was officially revealed as the voice actress behind Lucia Caminos in Grand Theft Auto VI. She was subsequently nominated for Best Performance at The Game Awards.

== Filmography ==
=== Film ===
Year	Title	Role	Notes	Ref.
2020	The Unborn	Tiffany		
2021	Armageddon Tales	Maya		
2023	Fire Island	Gloria		

=== Television ===
Year	Title	Role	Notes	Ref.
2017	Blindspot	Vanessa Eckert	Episode: "Upside Down Craft"	
2017	She's Gotta Have It	Dog #8	Episode: "#DaJumpoff (DOCTRINE)"	
2018	The Blacklist	Miss Isaacson	Episode: "The Informant (No. 118)"	
2018	Jessica Jones	Tina	Episode: "AKA Three Lives and Counting"	
2018	The Outlier	Ryann	Episode: "Project Phoenix"	
2019	Chicago P.D.	Devon Rozata	Episode: "The Forgotten"	
2020	Law & Order: Special Victims Unit	Esperanza Morales	Episode: "Redemption in Her Corner"	
2023	East New York	Lucia Santiago	Episode: "10-13"	
2025	Dora	Hearty	Voice; Episode: "The Grumple Games"	

=== Video games ===
Year	Title	Role	Notes	Ref.
2013	Grand Theft Auto V	Clubber #2	Voice	
2019	Grand Theft Auto Online	Blackjack dealer	Voice	
2026	Grand Theft Auto VI	Lucia Caminos	Voice, motion capture, and likeness	

== Awards ==
Year	Award	Category	Work	Result	Ref.
2020	Imagen Awards	Best Supporting Actress – Television	Law & Order: Special Victims Unit	Won	
2026	The Game Awards	Best Performance	Grand Theft Auto VI	Pending	
