= Grand Theft Auto: The Trilogy – The Definitive Edition =

2021 video game compilation

- Cover art with styles from (left to right) Vice City, Grand Theft Auto III, and San Andreas
- Developer: Grove Street Games (Note: Original games developed by Rockstar North; Grand Theft Auto III was developed under Rockstar North's previous name, DMA Design. Mobile version developed by Video Games Deluxe. Post-release development by Rockstar Games and Video Games Deluxe.)
- Publisher: Rockstar Games
- Series: Grand Theft Auto
- Engine: Unreal Engine 4
- Platforms: Nintendo Switch; PlayStation 4; PlayStation 5; Windows; Xbox One; Xbox Series X/S; Android; iOS
- Release: NS, PS4, PS5, Win, XONE, XSXS; 11 November 2021; Android, iOS; 14 December 2023
- Genre: Action-adventure
- Mode: Single-player

Grand Theft Auto: The Trilogy – The Definitive Edition is a 2021 compilation of three action-adventure games in the Grand Theft Auto series: Grand Theft Auto III (2001), Grand Theft Auto: Vice City (2002), and Grand Theft Auto: San Andreas (2004). Developed by Grove Street Games and published by Rockstar Games, all three games are remastered, with visual enhancements and gameplay upgrades. The games feature different protagonists and fictional locations within the same continuity. Grand Theft Auto III follows silent protagonist Claude in Liberty City; Vice City, set in 1986, features mobster Tommy Vercetti in Vice City; and San Andreas, set in 1992, follows gangster Carl "CJ" Johnson within the state of San Andreas.

The two-year development focused on maintaining the look and feel of the original games; the physics code was copied from the originals, and artificial intelligence was used to automatically upscale textures. The development team studied the distinctive qualities of the original games. They added several colouring, weathering, and lighting effects, as well as new assets from Grand Theft Auto V (2013). The team consulted with the original developers at Rockstar North when upgrading the character designs. Prior to release, existing versions of the three games were removed from sale from digital retailers, which led to criticism from audiences and journalists; in response, Rockstar restored the original versions on the Rockstar Store.

The Definitive Edition was released for the Nintendo Switch, PlayStation 4, PlayStation 5, Windows, Xbox One, and Xbox Series X/S on 11 November 2021, and for Android and iOS devices on 14 December 2023. The Windows launch was marred by problems with the Rockstar Games Launcher, rendering it unplayable for three days. The game received negative reviews; critics generally praised the enhanced visuals, upgraded lighting, improved controls, and added gameplay mechanics, but criticised its technical problems, art direction, and character models. It was one of the lowest-scoring games of 2021, and was the subject of review bombing on Metacritic. Rockstar apologised for the technical problems and announced its intentions to improve the game through updates.

== Contents ==
A comparison between Grand Theft Auto III (top) and The Definitive Edition (bottom)

Grand Theft Auto: The Trilogy – The Definitive Edition contains three games in the Grand Theft Auto series: Grand Theft Auto III (2001), Grand Theft Auto: Vice City (2002), and Grand Theft Auto: San Andreas (2004). They are action-adventure games played from a third-person perspective wherein the player completes missions—linear scenarios with set objectives—to progress through the story. Outside of missions, the player can freely roam the open world and has the ability to complete optional side missions. Some areas of the games become unlocked as the player progresses through the storyline.

Grand Theft Auto III is set in Liberty City, loosely based on New York City; it follows a silent protagonist, Claude, who is betrayed and left for dead by his girlfriend during a robbery and embarks on a quest for revenge that leads him to become entangled in a world of crime, drugs, gang warfare, and corruption. Vice City, set in 1986 in the fictional Vice City (based on Miami), follows mobster Tommy Vercetti who, after being released from prison and becoming caught up in an ambushed drug deal, begins building an empire by seizing power from other criminal organisations in the city. San Andreas is set in 1992 within the fictional state of San Andreas, consisting of three main cities: Los Santos, San Fierro, and Las Venturas (based on Los Angeles, San Francisco, and Las Vegas, respectively); the game follows former gangster Carl "CJ" Johnson, who returns home after his mother's death and is drawn back into the criminal life while clashing with corrupt authorities and rival criminals.

All three titles are remastered for The Definitive Edition, including a rebuilt lighting system, upgraded vehicle and character models, new navigation and heads-up display designs, and improved shadows, reflections, and draw distances. The controls were updated to match those of Grand Theft Auto V (2013), and the checkpoint system was improved to allow for an automatic restart after failing a mission. On Nintendo Switch, the games include gyro aiming and touchscreen support. Some music tracks and cheats from the original versions of the games were removed, as was San Andreas's cooperative multiplayer mode. The player can simultaneously run and shoot in all three games—a feature previously limited to San Andreas. (Note: This feature was added to Grand Theft Auto III and Vice City in an update in November 2024.)

== Development ==
Grand Theft Auto: The Trilogy – The Definitive Edition was developed by Grove Street Games and published by Rockstar Games. Under its former name War Drum Studios, Grove Street Games previously developed mobile versions of the trilogy, as well as the PlayStation 3 and Xbox 360 versions of San Andreas. The Definitive Edition was in development for two years, and used Unreal Engine 4 for rendering; the original games used RenderWare. The development team found porting the game to the engine made it look "clean", requiring them to make it appear dirtier to maintain the original look. Rockstar had resisted the trend of video game remakes as the team found they required care and attention, but they ultimately felt the remaster was "a way to maintain the titles for the next decade-plus" without dealing with the outdated technology. They found Grand Theft Auto III the most difficult of the trilogy to update due to the outdated assets; in comparison, San Andreas was much easier, as the original art department had learned to take advantage of the hardware at the time.

The team wanted The Definitive Edition to maintain the feeling of the original games; as part of this, they copied the original physics code. They originally attempted to rebuild some of the main buildings from scratch, such as the player characters' houses, but noticed a discrepancy in quality compared to other buildings. Some assets were improved from the original games, while others were ultimately rebuilt entirely. The team used an artificial intelligence program to upscale textures before making manual adjustments; producer Rich Rosado estimated over 100,000 textures were changed. The added navigation feature was implemented using pathfinding as well as analysing the routes taken by the non-player characters (NPCs), though it required some manual adjustments; the team found these implementations to be "easy wins" due to the existing technology. They wanted The Definitive Edition to run smoothly across all platforms while taking advantage of the higher-end hardware.

The team studied all three games to determine their distinct qualities, such as Vice City's "bright neons" and San Andreas's orange sky. They added dynamic colours that shift throughout the day, and corrected the placement and movement of the Sun, Moon, stars, and clouds. They changed some weather effects, such as the falling of rain and accumulation of puddles and their reflections. While the original games used "baked lighting"—"lighting [that] would just come from nowhere because we just need to light the scene"—The Definitive Edition uses the lighting from the sky, which forced the team to add artificial lights to avoid darkness in some locations, such as lampposts in alleys. All trees and foliage in the games, as well as some interior design elements, were replaced with higher-quality assets from Grand Theft Auto V; the team wanted them to naturally blend into the environment.

Rosado claimed "the art challenge alone felt insurmountable early on" due to the scale of remastering three games simultaneously, particularly the immensity of San Andreas. The team avoided making the games look too realistic as they felt the characters—whose motion capture data was coded to the original caricaturised wire-frame models—would look out of place. They wanted the characters to maintain their original appearance, noting the game "must look like you remember it". They faced difficulty when working on characters, as they felt adding detail "where there was no detail before" might conflict with the player's "mental image" of the character designs; the team consulted developers at Rockstar North, including some of the games' original artists. Much of the material from the original games—such as the source audio, textures, reference material, and character models—were unable to be found due to a lack of archives, as the original development team "never thought [they would] have to revisit these projects".

== Release ==
The existence of The Definitive Edition was first reported in August 2021 by Kotaku, claiming its development was led by Rockstar Dundee. Media speculation continued in September after the Game Rating and Administration Committee in South Korea gave the trilogy a game rating, and in early October after an update to the Rockstar Games Launcher included data referencing the game, such as logos, art, and achievements. Rockstar announced the trilogy on 8 October 2021, coinciding with the 20th anniversary month of Grand Theft Auto III's original release. It revealed the trilogy would feature "across-the-board upgrades ... while still maintaining the classic look and feel of the originals".

Existing versions of the three games were removed from sale from digital retailers on consoles and Windows on 13 October 2021. Audiences and journalists criticised the move, citing concerns with video game preservation, a lack of choice between versions, and the potential removal of music due to expired licences, which had occurred with previous re-releases. Eurogamer's Wesley Yin-Poole called the decision a "blow to video game preservation" and poor for player choice. Upon the game's release, Rockstar confirmed the music matched the trilogy's most recent 2014 re-releases, with over 30 songs missing from Vice City and San Andreas collectively. Some cheats were removed as they "didn't play well" in Unreal Engine. On 19 November, Rockstar announced the original versions would be released as a bundle on the Rockstar Store; they were delivered for free to owners of The Definitive Edition on 3 December, and remained available with all purchases of the game until 30 June 2022. Customers who bought The Definitive Edition through the Rockstar Games Launcher were eligible to receive one free Rockstar game (Note: The selection of games offered were Bully: Scholarship Edition, Grand Theft Auto IV: Complete Edition, Grand Theft Auto V: Premium Edition, L.A. Noire, and Max Payne 3. Players could alternatively redeem in-game currency in Grand Theft Auto Online or Red Dead Online.) between 20 December 2021 and 5 January 2022.

Preorders for The Definitive Edition began on 22 October 2021, alongside the release of the first full trailer and screenshots demonstrating the graphical enhancements. The game was released for Nintendo Switch, PlayStation 4, PlayStation 5, Windows, Xbox One, and Xbox Series X/S on 11 November 2021. Physical versions were initially scheduled to release on 7 December but were delayed to 17 December for PlayStation 4, Xbox One, and Xbox Series X, and to 11 February 2022 for Switch. The Windows version supports Nvidia DLSS, while the PlayStation 5 and Xbox Series X versions display at 4K resolution with up to 60 frames per second. The game was made available on Steam on 19 January 2023, allowing Steam Deck support, and on the Epic Games Store on 15 February.

The game was expected to launch on 11 November at 10 a.m. Eastern Standard Time (UTC−05:00), but an error on the PlayStation Store caused pre-orders to unlock at midnight locally, granting players in Australia and New Zealand access more than 24 hours before planned on PlayStation 4 and PlayStation 5. The digital listing was removed from the PlayStation Store in the interim. Upon release, the Rockstar Games Launcher went offline for a period of roughly 28 hours for "maintenance", rendering the game unplayable and unpurchaseable on Windows; the game remained unavailable after the launcher was restored, while Rockstar "remove[d] files unintentionally included" in the game. Based on information discovered by data miners, journalists suggested those files included the removed radio station songs, hidden notes from developers, and San Andreas's controversial "Hot Coffee" minigame. Following three days of unavailability, the Windows version was restored on 14 November. On 19 November, Rockstar announced it would work to fix and improve the game through updates, the first of which was released the following day. On 30 November, an option was added to San Andreas to view ground fog following criticism of its absence. An update in February 2022 resolved more than 100 bugs.

Android and iOS versions of The Definitive Edition were originally scheduled to be released in the first half of 2022. Rockstar's parent company Take-Two Interactive updated the release window for the mobile versions in May 2022 to its 2023 fiscal year, ending 31 March 2023, and in November replaced the release date with "TBA". In November 2023, Netflix announced The Definitive Edition would be released for Android and iOS on 14 December via the App Store and Google Play, available for Netflix subscribers and individual purchase. The mobile ports, developed by Video Games Deluxe, addressed additional bugs and added a lighting option to match the original games; these were added to the console and Windows versions via an update in November 2024. The update also removed Grove Street Games from the splash screen credits; the company's chief executive officer (CEO), Thomas Williamson, condemned this as a "dick move" and indicated the update was developed by Grove Street Games but withheld for years by Rockstar. Grand Theft Auto III and Vice City were removed from Netflix in December 2024, while San Andreas was removed in December 2025.

== Reception ==
=== Critical response ===
Reception

Aggregate scores
Aggregator	Score
Metacritic	XSXS: 56/100; PS5: 54/100; Win: 49/100; NS: 46/100
OpenCritic	12% recommend

Review scores
Publication	Score
Destructoid	4.5/10
GameSpot	4/10
Hardcore Gamer	3/5
IGN	5/10
Jeuxvideo.com	14/20
Nintendo Life	4/10
Push Square	5/10
The Guardian	2/5
Video Games Chronicle	PS5: 3/5; NS: 2/5
VideoGamer.com	6/10

The Definitive Edition received "mixed or average reviews" for PlayStation 5 and Xbox Series X/S, and "generally unfavorable reviews" for Nintendo Switch and Windows, according to review aggregator website Metacritic; it was among the site's lowest-scoring games in 2021. OpenCritic's consensus states the game "utterly fails at meeting player expectations", with 12% of critics recommending it. Video Games Chronicle's Jordan Middler described the collection as "far from 'definitive'", and Hardcore Gamer's Chris Shive felt the games "deserve a better collection than this". GameSpot's Justin Clark was confused as to why Rockstar, known for its high-quality and detailed games like Red Dead Redemption 2 (2018), would publish a remaster "that turns its most iconic games into app store shovelware". Jeuxvideo.com's Jerome Joffard felt the games maintained their original charm and feeling of freedom.

Destructoid's Dan Roemer wrote the updated visuals "look pretty solid", particularly praising the neon signs of Vice City. Screen Rant's Christopher J. Teuton said the games "look better here than they ever have before", excluding mods, though noted the increased draw distance in San Andreas made the map feel simpler and smaller. Several critics echoed the latter sentiment; Video Games Chronicle's Middler said it "feels like something you were never supposed to see", and IGN's Tristan Ogilvie wrote it "completely shatters the convincing illusion of scale". Zack Zwiezen of Kotaku described the improved graphics as "at times stunning and distracting", praising the improvements and additions of trees and foliage, but noting some broken or improperly-upscaled textures. VideoGamer.com's Josh Wise found the improved draw distances and lighting removed the dirtier mood of the originals, with Grand Theft Auto III and San Andreas missing the "grey-green murk" and the "beer-tinted haze", respectively. GameSpot's Clark echoed this sentiment and stressed the importance of art direction, noting the mood and personality of the games, cities, and characters had been largely lost. VG247's Fran Ruiz felt the 2024 update restored the "stylish" art direction of the original games.

Jeuxvideo.com's Joffard felt the improved lighting system highlights the themes of each game: the darker atmosphere of Grand Theft Auto III, bright colours of Vice City, and dusty roads of San Andreas. Sam Machkovech of Ars Technica called the lighting the "best part" of the game, and Middler of Video Games Chronicle felt it "captures the vibe perfectly", especially in Vice City, though noted the sunlight was occasionally too bright. NME's Jordan Olomon wrote the improved lighting effects "make it feel like what you imagined these games looked like when you were a kid". IGN's Ogilvie thought the lighting was inconsistent, enjoying the neon lights of Vice City and the general reflections in cars and puddles, but criticising the intense shadows and distracting rain effects; The Guardian's Keza MacDonald called the rain effects "so ugly that they obscure your view", and GameSpot's Clark said they render the games "virtually unplayable". Several critics found the lighting changes often made scenes too dark.

Critics praised the addition of mission checkpoints, the weapon wheel and map navigation, and the improved shooting controls, which many felt made the game easier and more enjoyable. Conversely, while IGN's Ogilvie enjoyed the addition of the map navigation, he noted some inconsistencies when attempting to place a custom waypoint while in a mission; he felt the mission checkpoints remained too unforgiving and found the auto-targeting to be inconsistent across the three games, with San Andreas performing better than the others. Destructoid's Roemer considered the combat disappointingly similar to the original games, calling it "incredibly rough and unforgiving at times". Screen Rant's Teuton criticised the removal of the cinematic and top-down camera angles from Grand Theft Auto III. Some critics voiced their disapproval at the removal of some radio station songs. Shive of Hardcore Gamer questioned the removal of the Confederate flag from a character's outfit, and Joffard of Jeuxvideo.com criticised the removal of the two-player mode from San Andreas. The mobile version's controls received mixed responses.

The updated character models (right) received mixed responses from critics, and contributed to a backlash from players.

Ars Technica's Machkovech wrote the updated character designs "generally shine" in comparison to the originals, though noted some "look pretty bad". IGN's Ogilvie similarly thought the designs were only occasionally distracting during cutscenes. Shive of Hardcore Gamer liked Claude's new character model, but felt Tommy looked "too young" and some NPC models "look like horrible mutant abominations". Olomon of NME described the models as "outright ridiculous". Joffard of Jeuxvideo.com felt the cartoonish designs of the new character models negatively juxtaposed the realistic graphical changes, and made several characters lose some of their personality and charisma; Middler of Video Games Chronicle concurred, noting "it doesn't seem like every character was given the care and attention they deserve". Polygon's Cameron Kunzelman and Destructoid's Roemer criticised Tommy's updated model, describing him as a "G.I. Joe doll" and "a bloated Ken doll", respectively. GameSpot's Clark called the character models "absolutely hideous".

Several reviewers recalled encountering technical errors and crashes. The Guardian's MacDonald wrote the "remasters feel less stable" than the original games; Teuton of Screen Rant found Vice City to be the most unstable of the three games. Ars Technica's Machkovech felt the game did not take advantage of the advanced hardware like the Xbox Series X, and criticised the "botched" high dynamic range; Push Square's Sammy Barker noted significant frame rate drops on the PlayStation 5 version. The Nintendo Switch version of the game was particularly criticised for its technical flaws; Nintendo Life's PJ O'Reilly censured the awkward shooting controls, frequent frame rate dips, and some character designs, though enjoyed the graphical upgrade for the world and lighting, particularly in Vice City. Middler of Video Games Chronicle denounced the Switch version's low-quality textures and lower display resolution compared to other platforms. Machkovech of Ars Technica criticised the game's pricing and frame rate issues, and noted he experienced at least one hardware crash in all three games. Playing on the Steam Deck in 2023, Rock Paper Shotgun's James Archer called the games "still a bit crap", citing technical glitches and bugs, performance issues, poor lighting and animations, and common frame rate drops.

=== Audience response ===
The game was the subject of review bombing on Metacritic, resulting in a user review score of 0.4/10 at its nadir, among the lowest on the site. Reporters noted some user reviews cited a dislike of the game's art style and the lack of advance copies sent to press, with several demanding refunds. Journalists noted a general backlash from players due to the unusual look of some updated character models, textual errors on in-game surfaces, issues related to draw distance increase, and model and physics glitches. Users created mods to improve the game by increasing rain transparency and restoring removed content.

=== Developer and publisher response ===
In response to the game's negative reception, Williamson said he was "enjoying this unparalleled level of scrutiny on our studio". A week after release, Rockstar apologised for the technical problems, admitting the games "did not launch in a state that meets our own standards of quality, or the standards our fans have come to expect". Rockstar reported members of the development team had been harassed online and urged its community to remain civil. In January 2022, Take-Two's CEO, Strauss Zelnick, said the game had a "glitch" at launch that was resolved and the game performed "just great for the company"; some journalists felt Zelnick was downplaying the major issues, and the following month, he reiterated the company "did fall short" and the game "definitely had some quality issues" that were being addressed. According to industry sources, the backlash resulted in Rockstar shelving remasters of Grand Theft Auto IV (2008) and Red Dead Redemption (2010), instead increasing focus developing Grand Theft Auto VI (2026). In 2026, Williamson said he agreed with reactions to the game but disagreed "with how the game was released and the response to it from a development side", and felt only Rockstar could develop "a perfect redux".

== Sales ==
In the United Kingdom, The Definitive Edition was the eighth-best-selling game in November 2021, (Note: Of the copies sold in the United Kingdom in November 2021, 59% were for PlayStation consoles, 28% for Xbox consoles, and 13% for Nintendo Switch; Windows data was unavailable.) and the 20th-best-selling in December; the chart combines physical and digital sales for consoles, though the game was only available digitally in November. Following its physical release, the game charted sixth in the United Kingdom's weekly boxed charts; 67% of copies sold were for PlayStation 4, with the remainder on Xbox. In its second week, the physical version fell to 23rd after sales dropped 70%, and it exited the top 40 the following week. On the PlayStation Store in November 2021, the game was the third-best-selling PlayStation 5 game in Europe and North America; it was the sixth-best-selling for PlayStation 4 in North America, and the eighth in Europe. In December, it was the 20th-best-selling PlayStation 5 game in Europe, and it placed 17th in the region for the year overall. In the United States, the physical version was the 57th-best-selling game of January 2022, and 16th in February.

Journalists estimated the game sold up to ten million copies by December 2021. (Note: Sales for the Grand Theft Auto series increased by fifteen million in December 2021; of these, five million were Grand Theft Auto V, leading to estimates the remaining ten million was The Definitive Edition.) In February 2022, Zelnick said sales exceeded expectations and the company felt "very good about how the title has performed commercially", though analyst Michael Pachter of Wedbush Securities said "everyone knew [it] underperformed". The mobile release saw Netflix's monthly game downloads increase almost threefold, becoming its "most successful launch to date" with over 18 million downloads by January 2024: 2.4 million for Grand Theft Auto III, 4.1 million for Vice City, and 11.6 million for San Andreas. (Note: Mobile downloads as of January 2024: Android: 700,000 (III), 900,000 (Vice City), 2.6 million (San Andreas); iOS: 1.7 million (III), 3.1 million (Vice City), 9.1 million (San Andreas)) These figures increased to more than 30 million downloads by June—3.3 million for III, 6.5 million for Vice City, and 20.5 million for San Andreas (Note: Mobile downloads as of June 2024: Android: 929,000 (III), 1.6 million (Vice City), 4.7 million (San Andreas); iOS: 2.4 million (III), 4.9 million (Vice City), 8.5 million (San Andreas))—while III and Vice City's figures reached 4.3 million and 9.65 million, respectively, when they were removed from Netflix in December. San Andreas reached 48.3 million downloads by June 2025 (including 2.5 million in the preceding month) and 57.4 million by November; it was Netflix's most-downloaded game, surpassing Squid Game: Unleashed by more than 27 million.
