= Lucia Caminos =

Fictional character in Grand Theft Auto VI

- Grand Theft Auto character
- Lucia Caminos in a promotional artwork for Grand Theft Auto VI
- First game: Grand Theft Auto VI (2026)
- Created by: Rockstar North
- Portrayed by: Manni L. Perez

In-universe information
- Full name: Lucia Maria Rivera Caminos
- Nicknames: Lu, Lucita, Loonie
- Occupation: Getaway driver
- Family: Mia Caminos (mother); Lorena Caminos (aunt); Diego (uncle)
- Significant other: Jason Duval
- Children: Tomás Duval (son, with Jason Duval)

Lucia Maria Rivera Caminos is a fictional character and one of two playable protagonists, alongside Jason Duval, in Rockstar Games' 2026 video game Grand Theft Auto VI. Portrayed by Manni L. Perez, she is the first non-optional playable female protagonist in the Grand Theft Auto series. (Note: Though the first non-optional female protagonist, Lucia is not the first playable female protagonist in the series overall, with blank female characters available to select in Grand Theft Auto and Grand Theft Auto II.) Originally from Liberty City, she is a skilled fighter who grew up being taught by her father. She is dedicated to achieving the "good life her mom has dreamed of since their days in Liberty City", and thus begins engaging in criminal activities in Liberty City, Liberty State and Vice City, Leonida, but is subsequently arrested and placed into the Leonida Penitentiary. She is later released on parole with an ankle monitor, but after performing more planned heists and criminal activities alongside crewmate and romantic interest Jason Duval, the two begin discovering a state-wide criminal conspiracy, requiring them to protect each other to stay alive.

Lucia was designed to be an independent, stoic, and strong female protagonist, intended to avoid common clichés seen in female characters, with designers aiming to mirror the weight and depth of protagonists from other games such as Niko Bellic from Grand Theft Auto IV and Arthur Morgan from Red Dead Redemption 2. Furthermore, her design was intended to mirror the motives and interests of Jason; whereas Jason wishes to reduce his engagement in criminal activities due to his own history in the US Marauders (presumed to be based off the U.S. Army Rangers), Lucia opts to continue pursuing significantly larger goals, producing a push-pull dynamic between the two characters.

After months of speculation, Perez was officially revealed to be the actress portraying Lucia during The Game Awards 2026's nominations announcement livestream, in which Perez was nominated for Best Performance for her role as Lucia. Though not the first overall female protagonist in the series, Lucia's character design as the first non-optional female Latina playable protagonist has been received positively, serving as a strong addition to the Grand Theft Auto franchise, particularly given the series' past controversies in regards to its portrayal and objectification of women. Her addition has also been praised for increasing public perception of the prevalent issue of sexism in gaming.

== Character design ==
Lucia was designed alongside the second playable Grand Theft Auto VI protagonist Jason Duval as a duo inspired by criminal partners Bonnie and Clyde, each complementing the other's personality and interests. Lucia's dedication and passion to providing a better life for herself and her family were intentionally created to conflict with the methods and interest of Jason, whom opts to enjoy a "simple life" following a negative experience in the U.S. military and undesirable circumstances. This design philosophy coincides with avoiding clichés for Latina female characters, ensuring she is presented as strong and durable while also having vulnerabilities and inherent weaknesses conflicting with Jason, intended to add additional depth to her character.

The design of Lucia was also partially inspired by game writer Alexa D'Agostino's own immigrant mother from Newark, New Jersey, made to be "rowdy, kind, but not to take any shit". As a result, she was designed as an embodiment of such people; in spite of a failed "easy" heist landing her in the Leonida Penitentiary, she pushes to continue with such activities against Jason's desire to leave the criminal realm, further exemplifying the character's complementary designs. This push-pull interaction is also utilized to allow the characters to develop and learn from one another, changing their philosophies and goals overtime. Lucia's design was also heavily influenced by her actress, Manni L. Perez, with Perez helping to develop Lucia into a character who is "vulnerable, tough, flawed, right sometimes, wrong sometimes, able to learn from [Jason and herself], and that's what we felt made [Jason and Lucia] authentic, and a great team."

== Character plot ==
Lucia Caminos was born in Liberty City, Liberty State to an immigrant mother of unidentified Latin descent, Mia Caminos. Lucia and her mother move to Vice City, Leonida, in search of achieving the "good life", purchasing a home with a small pool in the backyard with the intention of renovating and reselling it to start a wealthy real estate business. In an effort to help her mother pursue their business, Lucia begins engaging in various criminal activities throughout Vice City, Leonida to raise money, such as grand theft auto, a crime that she has been involved in since she was 14. During one such attempt, Lucia catches Jason Duval attempting to break into the same vehicle that she is trying to steal, resulting in a brief altercation which draws police attention. The two flee after the police begin questioning the vehicle's ownership, after which Jason and Lucia exchange information and begin dating, eventually having a son named Tomás. During this time, Lucia remains at home caring for Tomás while Jason continues working for marina owner and drug smuggler, Brian Heder, doing drug smuggling runs, stealing and selling cars and goods for fences, and various other crimes. Wanting to get more money, Lucia pushes Jason to try a larger robbery, to which Jason refuses as he doesn't want Lucia getting involved; however, Lucia goes to attempt a robbery of a payday loan business regardless, taking Tomás with her. The robbery ultimately fails, Lucia is arrested, and Tomás is taken by Child Protective Services and placed under custody of Lucia's aunt in Liberty City.

Nine months later, Lucia is released under parole with an ankle monitor as part of a program to reduce the incarcerated population in Leonida's prisons, requiring her to stay at Jason's home in the Leonida Keys (based off the Florida Keys) when not working for community service. Lucia begins joining Jason in his work with Brian Heder; further into their work, Lucia and Jason begin working with skilled bank robber Raul Bautista, Brian's old cellmate and a former member of the Dominican National Intelligence Department. The two assist Raul in completing increasingly large heists, serving as "extra guns" and getaway drivers.

== Reception ==
Lucia's introduction as the first non-optional female Latina protagonist in the Grand Theft Auto franchise has overall been received positively, with her addition particularly beneficial with the representation of female characters in video games. With the series' past controversies in its objectification of women, Rockstar's addition of Lucia has been praised in helping reverse the presentation of female characters and helping reduce sexism in video games. Lucia's design is acclaimed as not strictly following the sexualised Latina stereotype commonly associated with such characters, creating a more realistic, independent female character. Furthermore, her addition has been described as indicative of a general shift within Rockstar Games and the gaming industry as a whole to include more representation of historically underrepresented groups, such as Latino/a characters, women, and LGBTQ people.

Lucia's addition has received critique, with her visual character design still containing some elements present in the sexualised Latina stereotype. Lucia has also received backlash online, with her addition accused of being part of a "feminism agenda" and "woke slop", particularly in a sexist context. Some conservative influencers have expressed distaste for some of her greater abilities and potential intelligence in comparison to Jason, with fear that his design may appear as a weaker, "cuck-like" protagonist, as well as frustration for having to do housework as Jason rather than leaving it to Lucia. This response, however, has been deemed as an example of sexism within gaming.
