= Tommy Vercetti =

Fictional video game character

- Grand Theft Auto character
- First appearance: Grand Theft Auto: Vice City (2002)
- Created by: Rockstar North
- Voiced by: Ray Liotta
- Motion capture: Jonathan Sale

In-universe information
- Origin: Liberty City, United States
- Nationality: Italian-American

Thomas "Tommy" Vercetti is a fictional character and the playable protagonist of the action-adventure game Grand Theft Auto: Vice City (2002), the fourth main installment in Rockstar Games' Grand Theft Auto series. The series' first speaking protagonist, Tommy was voiced by American actor Ray Liotta.

Portrayed as a temperamental Italian-American gangster, Tommy is a made man or ex-soldato of the Forelli crime family, a fictional Mafia organisation. After serving a fifteen-year prison sentence for murder, Tommy is released in 1986 and resumes work for the Forellis in Vice City, a fictional city based on Miami, Florida. He becomes caught in an ambushed drug deal and is subsequently tasked with finding those responsible; a quest that leads him to make various criminal contacts as he slowly builds up his reputation in Vice City's underworld. Tommy eventually establishes a powerful criminal empire, becoming the city's kingpin.

Tommy's character was well-received by critics, who found him to be more fleshed-out and likeable than previous protagonists in the series, and praised his characterization, comparing it to that of Tony Montana from the crime drama film Scarface (1983). Liotta's performance as Tommy was also praised and earned him multiple year-end accolades.

== Concept and design ==
Concept art of Tommy sporting a similar hairstyle to his in-game appearance

Tommy Vercetti first appears wearing a teal Hawaiian shirt, jeans, and white sneakers. He is offered more wardrobe options as the game progresses. Tommy, in several ways, exhibits the characteristics of fictional drug lord Tony Montana from the 1983 film Scarface; this coincides with the heavy themes and appearance of the film that were implemented into Vice City. The interplay between Tommy and Lance Vance was crafted to be similar to the relationship between Miami Vice's Sonny Crockett and Ricardo Tubbs.

The developers spent time "solving [the] riddle" of a speaking protagonist, a notable departure from Grand Theft Auto III's silent protagonist Claude. Ray Liotta provided the voice of Tommy Vercetti. Liotta described the role as challenging: "You're creating a character that's not there before ... It's so intensive". When recording the role, the team used blue screen in order to allow Liotta to visualise "how it's gonna move". The team ensured that the player felt "real affinity" for Tommy, making the narrative a key development interest. Dan Houser described Tommy as "strong and dangerous and prepared to wait for the right opportunity to arrive". Director Navid Khonsari found Liotta occasionally difficult to work with. "In some sessions he was ... into it, but then sometimes ... he was very dark and couldn't work", said Sam Houser.

Before the release of Vice City, IGN stated that Tommy was likely to "leave the same kind of imprint on kids today that [actor Ray Liotta's] portrayal of Ray Sinclair left on every high school and college kid who saw Something Wild back in 1986." They also compared Liotta's portrayal of Tommy to his portrayal of Henry Hill in Goodfellas. When asked about his portrayal of Tommy, Liotta stated that "it was hard work." He said that "you're pretty much putting yourself in [the game developers'] hands and doing whatever they want so there's not much for you to do creatively."

== Appearances ==
Tommy Vercetti was introduced in the 2002 video game Grand Theft Auto: Vice City. His backstory is not explored outside a few lines of dialogue in certain missions, which allude to him being born in Liberty City to an Italian-American family. As a child, he often accompanied his father to his job as a printing press operator and helped him by cleaning the rollers. Initially aspiring to an honest life, he fell into crime as a teenager through Sonny Forelli, a Mafia boss who recruited him to the Forelli crime family as a made man. In 1971, Sonny, fearing Tommy's growing influence, set him up by sending him to perform a hit in the city's Harwood district, where he was ambushed by eleven men. Tommy survived and killed his assailants, but was arrested and convicted of murder, earning the nickname "The Harwood Butcher".

Initially placed on death row, Tommy's sentence was later commuted and he instead served fifteen years in prison, likely as a result of Sonny's influence. Once released in 1986, Tommy is contacted by Sonny, who sends him to Vice City to oversee a major drug deal as part of the Forellis' efforts to expand their operations to the south. The deal is ambushed, resulting in the loss of both the drugs and Sonny's money, which Tommy is ordered to recover. Aided by the Forellis' corrupt lawyer, Ken Rosenberg, Tommy investigates the ambush and makes several criminal contacts who offer him aid, including Colonel Juan Cortez, real estate developer Avery Carrington, and drug dealer Lance Vance, whose brother was killed in the ambush. Eventually, Tommy discovers that drug lord Ricardo Diaz orchestrated the attack and kills him with Lance's help.

Seizing Diaz's assets, Tommy moves into his mansion and begins running and expanding his criminal empire. He establishes the "Vercetti Gang", forms alliances with other criminal syndicates in Vice City, and distances himself from the Forellis. When Sonny catches wind of Tommy's newfound independence, he sends his men to attack Tommy's businesses before flying to Vice City himself to demand what he believes is rightfully his. Tommy meets with Sonny at his mansion and attempts to con him with counterfeit money, but Lance, who has been feeling neglected since Tommy's rise to power, betrays him and informs Sonny of the plot. A shootout then ensues, during which Tommy kills both Lance and Sonny. With his rivals eliminated, Tommy cements his position as Vice City's undisputed kingpin, naming Ken his right-hand man.

Not much is known about Tommy's life after 1986 other than his partnership with Ken being ultimately short-lived. At some point before 1992, when Ken's cocaine addiction became a serious nuisance for Tommy, he sent him to a rehabilitation center in Fort Carson, San Andreas, and abandoned him there. In The Introduction, a short prologue film to Grand Theft Auto: San Andreas, Ken gets out of rehab after completing his treatment and tries to contact Tommy, but is unsuccessful, as the latter has cut all ties with him.

== Critical reception ==
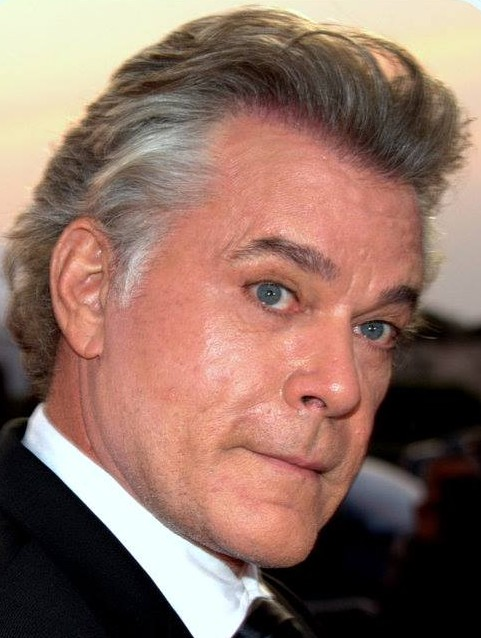
Ray Liotta's portrayal of Tommy was praised by critics audiences and earned him the Best Performance by a Human award at the 2003 Spike Video Game Awards.

Tommy Vercetti received very positive reviews and remarks from critics and players of Vice City, making it to many lists of the best video game characters. AllGame's Scott Alan Marriott found Tommy more engaging than Grand Theft Auto III's Claude; IGN's Perry felt that Rockstar "found the right person and the right choice", and Edge wrote that Tommy "sweats charisma", commending Ray Liotta's performance. CraveOnline stated that playing as Tommy was "a breath of fresh air". The Age praised Liotta's acting and stated "while the character riffs on Tony Montana throughout the game, Liotta's speeches give him a reckless sense of humour that makes him more likeable". GameDaily praised Liotta's portrayal as having transformed him from a generic-looking thug to a "tough guy who ruled the 80's." The Telegraph described Tommy as "the most amoral" Grand Theft Auto protagonist.

Andy Kelly of TheGamer described Tommy as the "Greatest GTA Protagonist", highlighting his role as the first fully developed character in the Grand Theft Auto series. Unlike the eight interchangeable protagonists in the earlier 2D games—whose differences were limited to superficial traits like clothing and skin tone—Tommy featured a well-defined personality. While Claude from Grand Theft Auto III introduced some character depth, his silence left him lacking in overall personality. Kelly credited Ray Liotta for bringing Tommy to life, though he noted that Liotta was initially unfamiliar with the franchise's scale and faced conflicts with Rockstar during the recording process. Through comparing Tommy to other protagonists like Niko Bellic, Michael De Santa, and Carl Johnson, Kelly emphasized how Tommy's motives and backstory make him stand out.

Liotta won the award for Best Live Action/Voice Male Performance at the 2003 G-Phoria Awards and Best Performance by a Human at the 2003 Spike Video Game Awards.
