= Michael Kearns (actor) =

American dramatist (1950–2026)

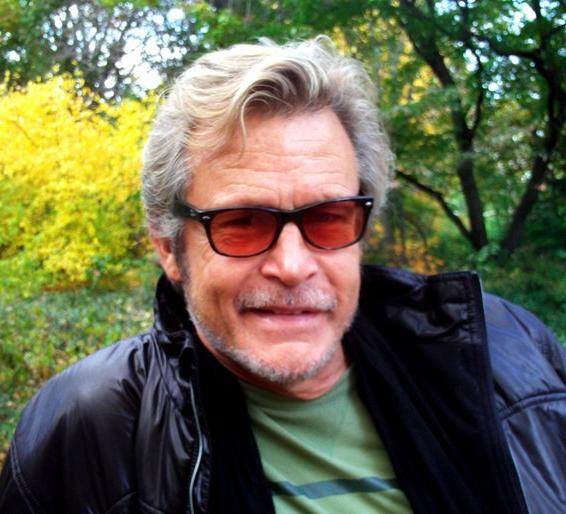
- Kearns in 2010
- Born: January 8, 1950; St. Louis, Missouri, U.S.
- Died: October 5, 2026 (aged 76)
- Occupations: Actor; writer; director; teacher; producer
- Years active: 1974–2026
- Website: michaelkearns.net

Michael Kearns (January 8, 1950 – October 5, 2026) was an American actor, writer, director, teacher, producer and activist. He is noted for having been one of the first openly gay actors, and after an announcement on Entertainment Tonight in 1991, the first openly HIV-positive actor in Hollywood. Kearns attended the Goodman School of Drama in Chicago before moving to Los Angeles in 1972, where he maintained a successful mainstream film and television career alongside an extensive theatrical involvement for over 25 years. He was actively engaged in the Los Angeles art and political communities, incorporating activism into his theater works. Kearns co-founded Artists Confronting AIDS in 1984 and was a commissioner of Parents, Families and Friends of Lesbians and Gays (PFLAG).

As an author, Kearns contributed to various magazines and newspapers and wrote five theater books, two of which were nominated for Lambda Literary Awards. Kearns received numerous awards for his contributions to theater, activism, and his openness about his HIV status.

== Early life and education ==
Kearns was born in St. Louis, Missouri on January 8, 1950. As a young man, he attended the Goodman School of Drama in Chicago, Illinois, and graduated in 1972 and moved to Los Angeles. For more than 25 years he was active in the Los Angeles art and political communities, maintaining a mainstream film and television career with a prolific career in the theatre. His activism was deeply integrated into his theatre works, and he had received grants from the City of Los Angeles Cultural Affairs Department, the Brody Foundation, and PEN Center USA West. In 1984, along with playwright James Carroll Pickett, he co-founded Artists Confronting Aids (ACA), and was a commissioner of Parents, Families and Friends of Lesbians and Gays (PFLAG).

== Author and journalist ==
Assuming the identity of fictitious author "Grant Tracy Saxon" Kearns intitially posed as having written Warner Books' The Happy Hustler (actually by Thom Racina) and was extensively involved in interviews and publicity for that 1975 book which included nude photographs of him. In reality, Kearns was a regular contributor to a number of magazines and newspapers, including the Frontiers, Los Angeles Times, L.A. Parent, IN Magazine, and L.A. Weekly. He was also author of five theatre books: T-Cells & Sympathy, Acting = Life, The Solo Performer's Journey, Getting Your Solo Act Together, and Life Expectancies. Both T-Cells & Sympathy and Acting = Life were nominated for Lambda Literary Awards.

Kearns also worked as a Southern California journalist.

== Personal life ==
In 1995, Kearns began proceedings that resulted in his adoption in 1997 of a child. In a March 2013 appearance on The Howard Stern Show on Sirius XM Radio, Kearns admitted to affairs with actor Rock Hudson and Barry Manilow. He lived in Los Angeles with his daughter who was born in 1994.

Kearns died on October 5, 2026, at the age of 76.

== Career ==
=== Theater ===
Kearns made his Los Angeles theatrical debut in Tom Eyen's The Dirtiest Show in Town at the Ivar Theatre. In 2005–2006, Kearns was the Artist Director of Space At Fountain's End where he curated and produced eighteen months of artistic expression including theatre, performance, jazz, fine art, photography, and poetry. Also in '06, Kearns directed Lan Tran's Elevator Sex (Off Broadway), The Tina Dance (throughout Los Angeles), and the twentieth anniversary production of Robert Chesley's Jerker. The City of Los Angeles Cultural Affairs Department awarded Kearns with a COLA Fellowship to create a new work, Make Love Not War, that premiered in 2005. The COLA performances "represent a non-thematic cross section of very current work by some of Los Angeles' best artists," according to Noel Korten, Curator and Director of Exhibitions of the Los Angeles Municipal Art Gallery.

His two widely lauded solo theatre pieces, Intimacies and More Intimacies, in which he portrays a dozen culturally diverse people with HIV/AIDS, were produced in Los Angeles, San Francisco, Chicago, Portland, Eugene, Minneapolis, Santa Barbara, San Antonio, Austin, San Diego, St. Louis, Tucson, Phoenix, Washington D.C., New York City, San Diego, Hartford, New Haven, Northampton, Sydney (Australia), Liverpool, London, and Manchester (England). In addition to other solo performance pieces (including The Truth Is Bad Enough, Attachments, Rock), and Tell Tale Kisses, Kearns has written several full-length plays: Myron, Mijo, Robert's Memorial, Who's Afraid of Edward Albee?, Blessings, Barriers, and the lyrics for Homeless, A Street Opera. Kearns co-wrote the screenplay for Nine Lives, based on his play, Complications. His solo piece Going In: Once Upon A Time in South Africa chronicles the time he spent in Johannesburg with his daughter, working at an orphanage.

=== As a director ===
Kearns directed and co-produced the Artists Confronting AIDS' landmark productions of AIDS/US in 1986, AIDS/US II in 1990, and AIDS/US/TEENS in 1994. He co-founded the S.T.A.G.E. (Southland Theatre Artists Goodwill Event) benefit, now in its 22nd year. He served as artistic director of Celebration Theatre for their 1986–87 season and of Artists Confronting AIDS for a decade, from 1984 to 1994. He directed the Los Angeles premieres of Robert Chesley's Night Sweat and Jerker, Rebecca Ranson's Warren, Eric Bentley's Round Two, Clark Carlton's Self Help, Syd Rushing's We Are One, Melanie DuPuy's Heroine and Doug Holsclaw's Life Of The Party. Throughout '04 and '05, Kearns directed a series of Precious Chong's Porcelain Penelope Shows that played in several Los Angeles venues as well as Off-Broadway.

=== As an actor ===
In 1993, Kearns played the title role in Charles Ludlam's Camille at Highways in Santa Monica, garnering rave reviews from the Los Angeles critics, as well as a Los Angeles Drama Critics Circle award nomination for his performance. "An actor giving the performance of his life," said Richard Shelton, theater reviewer for the Los Angeles Times. In addition to winning a Drama-Logue Award and a Robby Award, he was nominated by the Los Angeles Drama Critics Circle for Lead Performance. The artist received numerous acting awards, including the 1999 Garland Award for his critically acclaimed performance in Robert Harders' Bill and Eddie. Kearns both directed and appeared in Jerker (Los Angeles, San Diego, Des Moines), and originated the role of Christopher, on stage and on video, in Pickett's Dream Man (which has played New York City, San Francisco, Des Moines, L.A., Portland, Washington D.C., Atlanta, Edinburgh, Düsseldorf, Frankfurt, and London). Two revivals of James Carroll Pickett's Dream Man (with American actor Jimmy Shaw) were directed by Kearns: at Madrid's DT Espacio Escenico as part of the Festival Version Original (2005) and the Dublin Gay Theatre Festival (2007).

=== Television and film ===
Long before coming out of the closet was considered a career move in the entertainment industry, Kearns was the first Hollywood actor on record to come out in the mid-seventies, amidst a shocking amount of homophobia. He subsequently made television history in 1991 by announcing on Entertainment Tonight that he was HIV positive, and then in 1992, as an openly HIV-impacted actor, guesting on a segment of ABC TV's Life Goes On in which he played a character who had the virus. He played Cleve Jones in the HBO adaptation of Randy Shilts' And the Band Played On, appeared in A Mother's Prayer, It's My Party and had a recurring role on Beverly Hills, 90210... a variety of shows that depicted HIV/AIDS. Other television and film credits include Cheers, Murder, She Wrote, The Waltons, L.A. Tool & Die, Knots Landing, General Hospital, Days of Our Lives, The Fall Guy, A River Made to Drown In, Kentucky Fried Movie, and Brian De Palma's Body Double.

== Filmography ==
- Nine Lives (2004)
- A River Made to Drown In (1997)
- Beverly Hills, 90210 (3 episodes, 1996) (TV)
- It's My Party (1996)
- A Mother's Prayer (1995) (TV)
- And the Band Played On (1993) (TV)
- Life Goes On (1992) (TV)
- Knots Landing (1991) (TV)
- Dream Man (1991)
- Street Asylum (1990)
- Murder, She Wrote (1985) (TV)
- The Execution (1985) (TV)
- The Fall Guy (1985) (TV)
- Body Double (1984)
- Making of a Male Model (1983) (TV)
- Cheers (1983) (TV)
- L.A. Tool & Die (1979)
- The Kentucky Fried Movie (1977)
- Flush (1977)
- The Waltons (1974) (TV)

== Recognition ==
Kearns had been honored by the L.A. Weekly, Parents and Friends of Lesbians and Gays, the Gay and Lesbian Rights Chapter of the ACLU, National Coming Out Day and the Victory Fund.

1987: American Civil Liberties Union (ACLU) of Southern California, Lesbian and Gay Rights Chapter, award plaque.

1992: The Mayor of St. Louis, the artist's hometown, proclaimed November 19, 1992 as "Michael Kearns Day."

1993: Won a Drama-Logue and a Robby Award for his performance in Camille and was nominated by the Los Angeles Drama Critics Circle for Lead Performance.

1999: Received the Victory Award from the Gay & Lesbian Victory Fund.

2000: Back Stage West Garland Award.

2002: Playwrights' Arena Award for Outstanding Contribution to Los Angeles Theatre.

2005: He received a 2005 Robert Chesley Playwrighting Award.

2007: LA Weekly "Queen of Angels" award for his luminous track record in L.A.'s theatre history.

2009: STAGE Producers Award for long-standing commitment to worldwide battle against HIV/AIDS.
