= Hexum =

Hexum is a surname with Scandinavian origins. It comes from the Norwegian "heksum" meaning "the home/house of the witches". Notable people with the surname include:

- Jon-Erik Hexum (1957–1984), American model and actor
- Nick Hexum (born 1970), American singer, songwriter, and rapper
