= Mel Gilden =

US speculative fiction writer

- Born: July 3, 1947 (age 79); Chicago, Illinois, US
- Occupation: Writer
- Writing career
- Period: 1971-Present
- Genres: science fiction, juvenile fantasy
- Website: melgilden.com

Mel Gilden (born July 3, 1947) is an American writer of speculative fiction, predominately known for his Fifth Grade Monsters, Zoot Marlowe, Cronyn & Justice, and Cybersurfers fiction series. Gilden has written numerous episodes for animated television programs, including The Mask: Animated Series, Phantom 2040, James Bond Jr., Little Shop, Fraggle Rock, Defenders of the Earth, Centurions, The Flintstone Kids, He-Man and the Masters of the Universe, and The Smurfs.

Gilden received an AAS in Physics from Los Angeles City College in 1970, and a BA in physics from California State University, Los Angeles in 1974. He was co-host of the science-fiction interview show, Hour 25, on KPFK radio in Southern California 1981–1986. Gilden attended the Clarion Workshop in 1970, with his short story "What About Us Grils?" appearing in the first Clarion anthology.

== Select Bibliography ==
=== Cronyn & Justice ===
- Dangerous Hardboiled Magicians (2011)
- The Sea Was Wet as Wet Could Be (2012)

=== Cybersurfers ===
- Pirates on the Internet (1995) with Ted Pedersen
- Cyberspace Cowboy (1995) with Ted Pedersen
- Ghost on the Net (1996) with Ted Pedersen
- Cybercops & Flame Wars (1996) with Ted Pedersen

=== Fifth Grade Monsters ===
- M Is for Monster (1987)
- Born to Howl (1987)
- The Pet of Frankenstein (1988)
- Z Is for Zombie (1988)
- Monster Mashers (1989)
- Things That Go Bark in the Park (1989)
- Yuckers! (1989)
- The Monster in Creeps Head Bay (1990)
- How to Be a Vampire in One Easy Lesson (1990)
- Island of the Weird (1990)
- Werewolf, Come Home (1990)
- Monster Boy (1990)
- Troll Patrol (1991)
- The Secret of Dinosaur Bog (1991)

=== Star Trek Universe ===
- The Starship Trap (1993)
- Boogeymen (1991)
- The Pet (1994) with Ted Pedersen
- Cardassian Imps (1997)

=== Zoot Marlowe ===
- Surfing Samurai Robots (1988)
- Hawaiian U.F.O. Aliens (1990)
- Tubular Android Superheroes (1991)

=== Standalone Novels ===
- The Return of Captain Conquer (1986)
- Outer Space and All That Junk (1989)
- The Planetoid of Amazement (1991)
- The Pumpkins of Time (1994)
- Britney Spears Is a Three-Headed Alien (2001)
- The Jabberwock Came Whiffling (2013)
- The Accidental Time Cadet (2015)
- The Coincidence Couch (2017)

=== Beverly Hills, 90210 ===
Novelizations of scripts from the television show.

1. Beverly Hills 90210 (1991)
2. No Secrets (1992)
3. Which Way to the Beach? (1992)
4. Fantasies (1992)
5. Tis the Season (1993)
6. Two Hearts (1993)
7. Where the Boys Are (1993)
8. More Than Words (1993)
9. Summer Love (1993)
10. Senior Year (1993)
11. Graduation Day (1994)
12. College Bound (1994)
