= Voyagers! =

American science fiction series

- Genre: Science fiction
- Created by: James D. Parriott
- Written by: Jill Donner; Robert Janes; James D. Parriott; Harry Longstreet; Renee Longstreet
- Directed by: Peter Crane; Alan J. Levi; Bernard McEveety; Ron Satlof; Paul Stanley; Virgil W. Vogel
- Starring: Jon-Erik Hexum; Meeno Peluce
- Theme music composer: Jerrold Immel
- Opening theme: Jerrold Immel
- Composers: Jerrold Immel (episode 1, 5); Elliot Kaplan (episode 2–4, 8–9, 11, 13, 15, 19); Peter Myers (episode 6–7); Joel Rosenbaum (episode 10, 12, 14, 16, 18); J. A. C. Redford (episode 20); No composer credited (episode 17)
- Country of origin: United States
- Original language: English
- No. of seasons: 1
- No. of episodes: 20

Production
- Executive producer: James D. Parriott
- Producers: Robert Bennett Steinhauer; Jill Donner; Harry Longstreet; Renee Longstreet
- Cinematography: Eddie Rio Rotunno
- Editor: George Ohanian
- Camera setup: Single-camera
- Running time: 60 minutes
- Production companies: James D. Parriott Productions; Scholastic Productions; Universal Television

Original release
- Network: NBC
- Release: October 3, 1982 – July 10, 1983

Voyagers! is an American science-fiction television series about time travel that aired on NBC from October 3, 1982, to July 10, 1983, during the 1982–1983 season. The series starred Jon-Erik Hexum and Meeno Peluce.

== Plot ==
Phineas Bogg (Jon-Erik Hexum) is one of a society of time travelers called Voyagers, who with the help of a young boy named Jeffrey Jones (played by Meeno Peluce) from 1982, uses a hand-held device called an Omni (which looks like a large pocket watch) that flashes red when history is wrong and green when the timeline is corrected, to travel in time and ensure that history unfolds correctly.

Bogg and Jeffrey first met when Bogg's Omni malfunctioned and took him to 1982 (the device was not supposed to reach any later than 1970), landing him in the skyscraper apartment of Jeffrey's aunt and uncle, who were caring for him after his parents' deaths. Bogg's guidebook, which contained a detailed description of how history was supposed to unfold, was grabbed by Jeffrey's dog Ralph, and in the struggle to retrieve it, Jeffrey accidentally fell out his bedroom window and Bogg jumped out to rescue him by activating the Omni. With his guidebook stuck in 1982, Bogg (who, being more interested in girls than in history, apparently never paid much attention in his Voyager training/history classes) had to rely on Jeffrey, whose father had been a history professor, to help him. Jeffrey's knowledge proved invaluable; for example, in the first episode, Jeffrey ensured that baby Moses' basket traveled down the Nile, where it was met by the Pharaoh's daughter.

Phineas is a great womanizer and manages to fall for a beautiful woman in almost every episode. Whenever Jeffrey's wisdom was paired up against Bogg's stubbornness, Jeffrey usually wins out, to which Bogg would always mutter, "Smart kids give me a pain!" Another catchphrase used by Bogg as an expletive was "Bat's breath!" They develop a strong relationship and become a formidable team. In the course of their adventures together, they sometimes encounter other Voyagers whose missions happened to overlap with theirs.

As revealed later in the series, despite Jeffrey's age and the accidental circumstances of his first encounter with Phineas, he was always destined to become a Voyager.

Over the closing credits of each episode, regular cast member Meeno Peluce said in voice-over: "If you want to learn more about [historical element from the episode], take a voyage down to your public library. It's all in books!"

== Cast ==
Meeno Peluce as Jeffrey Jones (left) and Jon-Erik Hexum as Phineas Bogg (right)

- Jon-Erik Hexum as Phineas Bogg
- Meeno Peluce as Jeffrey Jones

== Reception ==
Tom Shales of The Washington Post praised the series as "a live-action version of the Mr. Peabody and Sherman cartoons on the delightful old 'Bullwinkle' show" and "largely a joy ride from start to finish."

Voyagers! ran for one season of 20 episodes, broadcast opposite the top-rated 60 Minutes. The series averaged a 17 share. Voyagers! seemed likely to be renewed for a second season, but controversies in 60 Minutes reporting led executives to believe that 60 Minutes might successfully be challenged by a competing news program, instead. NBC cancelled Voyagers! and replaced it with the news magazine program Monitor, which averaged only a 7 share. David Letterman poked fun at NBC's cancellation of the series by airing a sketch on his Late Night program titled "They Took My Show Away", a parody of an after-school special in which the host comforts a boy who was a Voyagers! fan.

== U.S. television ratings ==
Season	Episodes	Start date	End date	Nielsen rank	Nielsen rating
1982–83	20	October 3, 1982	July 10, 1983	95	N/A

== Home media ==
=== Television film ===
In 1985, following the death of series lead Jon-Erik Hexum during the run of his subsequent series Cover Up the previous year, Universal re-edited several episodes of the show into a television film. Entitled Voyager from the Unknown, the story combined the pilot episode and "Voyagers of the Titanic" into one feature-length film. This version incorporates new video special effects, some voice-over dubbing for Hexum and Peluce's characters that changed, and added dialogue and new footage to include a supercomputer directing Voyager missions.

The opening begins with a narration and painted illustrations of Bogg receiving his guidebook on "Planet Voyager" by artist Jerry Gebr.

"Far out in the cosmos there exists a planet known as Voyager, where the mystery of travel into space and through time has been solved. It is inhabited by a race who call themselves Voyagers. Their purpose is to keep constant surveillance on history. These people have a time machine device, the Omni, which will take them into the past, present or future. As each Voyager graduates he is given an omni and a guidebook. One such graduate Phineas Bogg, who was assigned as a field worker to operate in certain time zones."

=== VHS release ===
The re-edited telefilm was issued on VHS by MCA Home Video in 1985. It was the only official release of Voyagers! on home video in the US until the DVD release in 2007.

=== DVD release ===
On July 17, 2007, Universal Studios Home Entertainment released all 20 episodes of Voyagers! on DVD in Region 1. It was released in Region 2 on October 29, 2007.

=== Streaming ===
All 20 episodes are also available in the United States by streaming through Amazon Prime Video.

As of September 2024, the series is available on The Roku Channel.

== Episodes ==
No.	Title	Original release date
1	"Voyagers"	October 3, 1982
Time traveler Phineas Bogg accidentally goes to New York City in 1982 using a hand-held time machine known as an Omni. There, he meets 11-year-old Jeffrey Jones, whose parents have died. When Jeffrey falls out a window, Bogg goes after him and they both disappear. Bogg cannot bring Jeff back to 1982, because Bogg's Omni only has circuits up to 1970. (Bogg was only able to go to 1982 because his Omni had malfunctioned.) In saving Jeffrey's life, Bogg was unable to retrieve his guidebook (a book that told how history should have happened) in 1982, so in 1450 BC, Jeff helps Bogg as a Voyager by putting baby Moses in the Nile River in Ancient Egypt, but in France, an alternate ending to World War I is taking place in 1918, without airplanes. They meet an aspiring US actress played by Faye Grant. They both go back in time to 1903 in Kitty Hawk, North Carolina, and there, Bogg angers Jeffrey when he says something about his father. Later, Jeffrey sadly tells Bogg about how his mom and dad died. He cries when he says he could not get anyone to stop. Bogg tells Jeffrey not to blame himself and covers Jeff up, whereupon Jeff falls asleep. The two then travel to Dayton, Ohio, and inspire the Wright brothers to invent the first airplane, the Wright Flyer. Next, they jump ahead in time, making sure the Allies have airplanes in World War I—battling the Red Baron in an aerial dogfight along the way. Then, they go to England, on October 14, 1066, in the middle of the Battle of Hastings.
2	"Created Equal"	October 10, 1982
The issue of slavery is focused on as the Voyagers end up in Italy in 73 BC during a gladiator training session overseen by Cicero. They meet Spartacus and are thought to be slaves, but they escape to Missouri in 1847. There, they meet 12-year-old Samuel Langhorne Clemens and end up helping Harriet Tubman with the Underground Railroad. They then return to Ancient Rome and free Spartacus so he can rally his fellow slaves back in Capua.
3	"Bully and Billy"	October 24, 1982
The Voyagers end up in Santiago, Cuba on July 1, 1898, during the Spanish–American War, but the Spanish are winning, because Theodore Roosevelt and the Rough Riders are not there to help because Billy the Kid had killed Roosevelt in 1880. After helping Benjamin Franklin with his kite in Philadelphia, Pennsylvania, on June 10, 1752, they time travel to 1880 and team up with Billy the Kid's outlaw gang to prevent the future U.S. president from being shot in the American Old West.
4	"Agents of Satan"	October 31, 1982
Jeffrey and Bogg land in Salem, Massachusetts, on November 13, 1692, during the Salem witch trials—but the Salem witch trials were supposed to end on September 14, 1692. Bogg and Jeff must prevent the mother of Benjamin Franklin, Abiah Folger, from being hanged. Bogg, however, is himself tried and sentenced as an Agent of Satan, to be burned at the stake, but Jeffrey uses the Omni to send them both to Boston in 1924. There they meet Harry Houdini during a séance and then go to Baltimore, Maryland, to return the lyrics of the national anthem to Francis Scott Key in 1814, just before stopping a charlatan who tries to kill Houdini in 1924; they then go back to 1692 and stop the witch trials for good.
5	"Worlds Apart"	November 7, 1982
After a badly worn-out Omni nearly strands them in Siberia, Bogg and Jeff become separated in the Middle East in 1917 during the conflicts between Arab tribes and Ottoman Turks. Jeffrey barely escapes with the Omni. Bogg meets Lawrence of Arabia (Judson Scott), and they are imprisoned by Turks but escape with the help of an Arab woman named Medina. Meanwhile, in Menlo Park, New Jersey (October 19, 1879), Jeffrey helps Thomas Alva Edison (Steven Keats) with the invention of the (practical incandescent) electric light. Edison dismantles the Omni and, though unable to learn its secrets, he does manage to repair it. Jeffrey then reunites with Bogg in Aqaba, then travel back to 1879 on December 31 to witness Thomas Edison demonstrate incandescent lighting to the public for the first time.
6	"Cleo and the Babe"	November 14, 1982
In Rome, Italy, on March 15, 44 BC, Bogg and Jeff meet Cleopatra on the Ides of March where Julius Caesar is assassinated in the Roman Republic on the Senate Floor. But when they help her escape to Egypt, they end up with her being lost in New York City on May 21, 1927. Jeff notices that Yankee Stadium is not there, because Babe Ruth never got traded to the Yankees. They go and meet Isaac Newton in England, 1669 to help him solve the riddle of gravitation just before going to Boston, Massachusetts, in 1919 to make sure Ruth becomes a hitter with the Boston Red Sox. On September 29, 1927, they find Cleopatra, but they realize that they also have to protect Babe Ruth from crime boss Lucky Luciano so that Ruth can hit his 60th home run on September 30.
7	"The Day the Rebs Took Lincoln"	November 21, 1982
Bogg and Jeff are captured by the Confederate States Army on November 19, 1863, in Gettysburg, Pennsylvania, because the South is winning the American Civil War. They learn that the Confederates kidnapped Abraham Lincoln on April 18, 1862, in Washington, D.C., but after escaping the camp, they go to London, England in 1832 where they meet Charles Dickens. Back in Washington, a presidential liaison betrays Lincoln, but the Voyagers bring Lincoln's hijacked presidential carriage back under Union control.
8	"Old Hickory and the Pirate"	November 28, 1982
In New Orleans, Louisiana, of 1815, the War of 1812 has not ended and the British control the city. Bogg & Jeff help Meriwether Lewis and William Clark in the Northwest Passage in 1803 just before they go to the Bahamas in 1798 to keep Jean Lafitte from being convicted of piracy in his future. There they encounter a group of pirates led by Black Bill Scroggins and after a swashbuckling scuffle on the beach, Lafitte goes to New Orleans and the Voyagers jump ahead to the Battle of New Orleans and meet General Andrew Jackson.
9	"The Travels of Marco...and Friends"	December 3, 1982
In New York, on December 11, 1930, the Voyagers save Albert Einstein (Nathan Adler) and his wife from a falling desk. They then meet Isaac Wolfstein (Michael Fox), an old retired Voyager, whom Bogg recognizes as the legendary "Wildman Wolfstein." But when Isaac asks to go to an island in the South Pacific, they end up helping Clara Barton in 1870 France during the Franco-Prussian War, before going to July 1, 1946, on one of the Marshall Islands. After leaving Isaac on an island, Bogg and Jeff go to China on August 13, 1275. There, they meet Kublai Khan and there he tells them that Marco Polo and the Polo brothers have not come yet with the Holy Oil from Jerusalem; they then go to Persia in 1272 to keep the Polo brothers from mysteriously disappearing. Bogg then goes back and retrieves Isaac from a nuclear testing site in Bikini Atoll; both then go to the Strait of Hormuz where, with Isaac's help, Bogg frees his young companion from the Karuna, a group of Mongol slave traders.
10	"An Arrow Pointing East"	December 12, 1982
After arriving just from Hawaii, Bogg and Jeff help a wounded Robin Hood in the Sherwood Forest in England in 1194 and learn from Little John and Friar Tuck that the Sheriff of Nottingham is holding Maid Marian captive. When the Sheriff's soldiers trap the Voyagers, they jump to New York, on May 19, 1927. On Long Island, they help Charles Lindbergh make his historic flight from New York to France in the Spirit of St. Louis. They then go back to help Robin Hood rescue Maid Marian in 1194 before going back again to France on May 21, 1927, to see "Lucky Lindy" land in France...from a distance.
11	"Merry Christmas, Bogg"	December 19, 1982
In Trenton, New Jersey, on December 24, 1776, George Washington is on the wrong side during the American Revolution one day before he is supposed to win the Battle of Trenton, so the Voyagers go to Mount Vernon, Virginia, in 1746 to keep him from joining the Royal Navy as a teenager. Then in Pittsburgh, Pennsylvania, on December 24, 1892, they meet Jeffrey's own great-grandfather, Stephen Jones, who is friends with Samuel Gompers. Bogg & Jeff then go back to 1776 again just before the Battle of Trenton and witness George Washington's crossing of the Delaware River. Back in 1892, Stephen Jones convinces Bogg to leave the orphaned Jeff with him and his wife. Jeff, however, begs Bogg not to leave him and they stay together.
12	"Buffalo Bill and Annie Play the Palace"	January 9, 1983
In England, 1887, the Voyagers must prevent a wedding between England's Princess Victoria and Duke Michael of Russia. Queen Victoria has invited Buffalo Bill and Annie Oakley to perform a Wild West show. A shooting competition had been arranged between the Duke and Annie, but the Duke's men kidnap Oakley to avoid the possibility of the Duke losing. Outnumbered, Bogg and Jeff time jump into Africa, in 1913. There, they help Dr. Albert Schweitzer treat a dying chief, but a witch doctor believes that the Voyagers are slave traders. Schweitzer's aid arrives with the medicine in time to save the chief's life, and back in England, they free Oakley from the Russians in time for her to beat the Duke at the shooting match. They then expose the kidnapping to the Queen, who breaks off the marriage alliance with the Russians.
13	"The Trial of Phineas Bogg"	January 16, 1983
The Voyagers appear in an empty courtroom with a non-functioning Omni. A defense attorney named Susan claims Bogg has violated the Voyager Code and will be put on trial by Voyager Drake (Stephen Liska), a tough prosecutor. Three judges take the bench, and Bogg is charged with endangering Jeff's life. However, evidence of perjury during the trial is discovered, showing that Drake had tampered with the Omni Memory Recorder. When Drake attempts to escape with his Omni, the Voyagers grab him and end up in the Texas Revolution in Mexico in 1836. Drake escapes somewhere in time while Bogg & Jeff help Sam Houston and the Texan rebels. Susan then brings them back and a judge tells them that Jeff's destiny was to be a Voyager. He gives Bogg his Omni, but they go back to work and disappear before he can give them a new Guidebook.
14	"Sneak Attack"	February 13, 1983
In Pearl Harbor, Hawaii, on December 6, 1941, Jackie Knox, an Army Intelligence Officer, follows the Voyagers and steals the Omni, bringing them to Utah, on April 10, 1860. They find an injured teenage Bill Cody, who was riding for The Pony Express but was attacked by outlaws. Bogg convinces Jackie that Voyagers help people in history. But when Jeff decides to make the Pony ride and gets ambushed, the trio jump back to Hawaii on the morning of December 7. During the Attack on Pearl Harbor, Jackie saves the life of General Douglas MacArthur. They then use a 1941 motorcycle for the Pony ride in 1860 in order to outrun the bandits.
15	"Voyagers of the Titanic"	February 27, 1983
Bogg & Jeff land in the middle of the Atlantic Ocean on the deck of the RMS Titanic on April 14, 1912. While Jeff tries to warn the captain with Molly Brown, Bogg meets a man named Haggerty, who is not a Voyager, but has an Omni. It belongs to Voyager Olivia Dunn, who is trying to get the Mona Lisa off the ship. The three Voyagers then jump to 1884, France, where a dog bites Jeff and gives him rabies. Louis Pasteur then works on a vaccine and Jeff fully recovers. They all go back to the Titanic, and Bogg finds Haggerty in the boiler room, where they get the Mona Lisa just as the ship goes underwater. In Paris, April 15, 1912, Jeff (who had left separately) believes that they died until they show up and explain that they had to bring the stolen painting back to the home of Vincenzo Peruggia.
16	"Pursuit"	March 6, 1983
Bogg brings Jeff to Cape Canaveral, Florida, to see the first Moon landing—but the space program of the United States does not exist; German rocket technology was given to the Soviet Union at the end of World War II, but not to the United States. This means Bogg and Jeff have to go to Austria on May 1, 1945, in order to ensure rocket scientist Wernher von Braun surrenders to American forces. Bogg tries to warn von Braun that one of his scientists is a spy for the Nazis before they finally meet Americans and he gives them his rocket plans. Then they go to July 20, 1969, and see the Apollo 11 Moon landing on television as Neil Armstrong utters his famous quote, "That's one small step for (a) man, one giant leap for mankind."
17	"Destiny's Choice"	March 13, 1983
In Hollywood, 1928, the Voyagers end up on a closed set of the first sound film. When Jeff points out that the director is Franklin D. Roosevelt, they know all is wrong in Tinseltown. They go to Roosevelt's home in Hyde Park, New York, in 1924 to keep him from mailing out a script and get known in Hollywood, but his wife, Eleanor, is at odds with Roosevelt's mother who is ashamed of his polio. Posing as a handyman, Bogg helps Roosevelt use crutches and convinces him not to depend so much on others. This allows Roosevelt to make an important public speech, move up in politics and, eventually, become President.
18	"All Fall Down"	March 27, 1983
On June 21, 1938, in Pompton Lakes, New Jersey, the Voyagers see Joe Louis training for a boxing match. When Bogg knocks down Louis in a practice bout, he decides to quit boxing. Fearing the coaches will hurt Bogg, Jeff time jumps them to an airplane over Nevada in February 1970. There, an aircraft hijacker releases gas which knocks everyone out except for Jeff. An air traffic controller then helps him land the Boeing 747 with future president Jimmy Carter on board. Back in 1938, they convince Louis not to listen to claims of racial superiority about his opponent, Max Schmeling. Bogg & Jeff help train Louis and on June 22, Louis wins against Schmeling and retains his title of "Heavyweight Champion Of The World."
19	"Barriers of Sound"	June 12, 1983
In Denison, Texas, on October 14, 1890, Bogg and Jeffrey discover that the telephone has not been invented. If the telephone is not invented, then Dwight D. Eisenhower will not be born, as there will then be no medical assistance. Thus, they travel to Boston, in 1875, where Bogg saves the life of a deaf woman, named Mabel Hubbard. They find Alexander Graham Bell, but his invention, the telephone, does not work. Jeff realizes that Mabel will be Bell's wife and arranges a meeting, but Mabel and Bogg fall in love with each other instead. To avoid compromising his mission, Bogg reluctantly breaks Mabel's heart; he and Jeff then go to March 7, 1876, where Bell and Thomas A. Watson are working on the phone. When Bell injures himself and screams, "Mr, Watson! Come here, I want you!" Watson, hearing Bell's voice on the telephone, jumps for joy, knowing they succeeded. Back in Texas, in 1890, Bogg and Jeff help guarantee the birth of Dwight Eisenhower by getting assistance from a doctor on the phone.
20	"Jack's Back"	July 10, 1983
In London, November 19, 1889, an American journalist named Nellie Bly (Julia Duffy) is attacked by a man, but the attacker vanishes when Bogg and Jeff appear. When her friend Sir Arthur Conan Doyle (Michael Ensign) begins to question Bly about her attacker, she suspects Bogg is the infamous Jack the Ripper and gets the police. Inspector Lestrade of Scotland Yard arrests Bogg, and the Voyagers realize renegade Voyager Drake was Bly's attacker. After they escape from Lestrade, they find Drake about to kill Bly and Doyle in order to "ruin history," but Bogg and Jeff stop him before he vanishes in time.

== Bibliography ==
- Snauffer, Douglas; Thurm, Joel (2008). The Show Must Go On: How the Deaths of Lead Actors Have Affected Television Series. McFarland. ISBN 978-0-7864-3295-0.
