= Ned Luke =

American actor (born 1958)

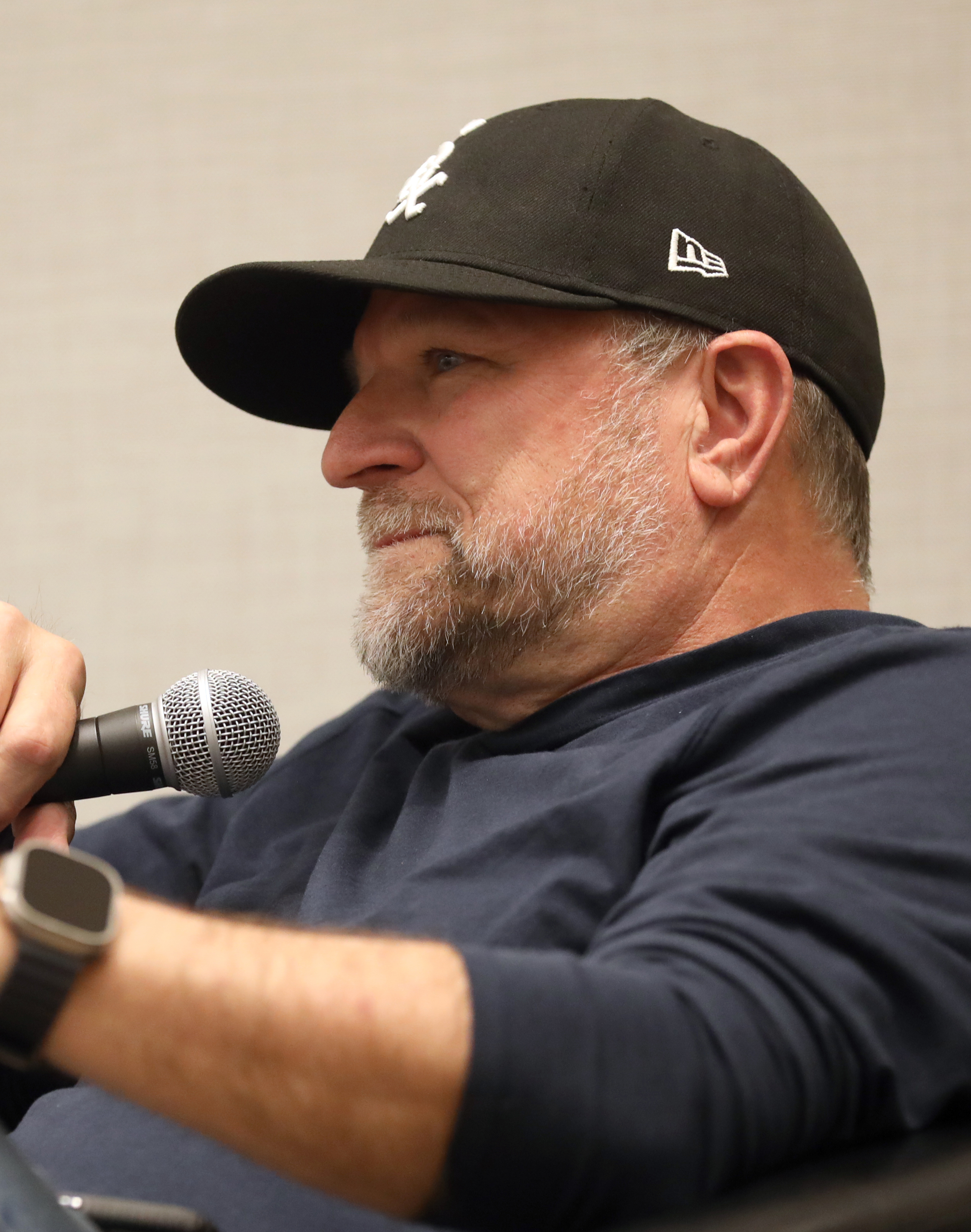
- Luke at the Phoenix Convention Center in 2024
- Born: October 4, 1958 (age 68); Danville, Illinois, U.S.
- Other name: Ned von Leuck
- Occupation: Actor
- Years active: 1984–2007; 2009–present
- Known for: Portrayal of Michael De Santa in Grand Theft Auto V
- Spouse: Amy Sax (m. 1997)
- Children: 1

YouTube information
- Channel: Ned Luke
- Subscribers: 532,000
- Views: 38.57 million
- Last updated: October 31, 2026

Ned Luke (born October 4, 1958) is an American actor and YouTuber. He is known for portraying Michael De Santa in the video game Grand Theft Auto V (2013), and later reprised the role in 2025 for Grand Theft Auto Online. Throughout his acting career, Luke has appeared in 31 films and television shows, in addition to performing in over 100 commercials. He is also known for livestreaming video games, including Grand Theft Auto V on YouTube, and has 532,000 subscribers there.

== Early life ==
Ned Luke was born on October 4, 1958 in Danville, Illinois. In the late 1980s, Luke had a job as a mobile billboard driver, which he described as a "chick magnet." During this time, he was a two-time contestant on Win, Lose or Draw.

== Career ==
=== Working with Rockstar Games ===
His agent suggested he audition for the role of Michael De Santa, one of the three protagonists of Rockstar Games' 2013 video game Grand Theft Auto V. Luke initially rejected the idea of being in a video game, but after reading the script he decided to proceed with the audition and, alongside Shawn Fonteno and Steven Ogg, was eventually cast. Grand Theft Auto V went on to set several sales records and has become the 2nd highest grossing video game in history.

Luke continued his professional relationship with Rockstar Games after the release of Grand Theft Auto V. Upon learning that Red Dead Redemption 2 was in development, he expressed interest in joining the Western-themed project. Thanks to his positive rapport with the company, Rockstar allowed him to portray a non-playable character using both voice and motion capture. However, Luke later revealed that his voice had been dubbed over by another actor. He attributed this change to "creative differences" and speculated that Rockstar may have wanted to avoid drawing player attention to his character. In 2025, Luke reprised his role as Michael De Santa in Grand Theft Auto Online, for the "A Safehouse in the Hills" update, marking his first appearance as the character since Grand Theft Auto V.

=== Other work ===
Throughout his acting career, Luke has appeared in 31 films and television shows, in addition to performing in over 100 commercials. He has guest-starred on television series such as Boardwalk Empire and Law & Order: Special Victims Unit and served as host of the Future Games Show at Gamescom 2024.

In 2024, Luke partnered with ASUS Republic of Gamers (ROG) as a brand ambassador, starring in their "ROG Travel Agency" global commercial campaign alongside fellow Grand Theft Auto V co-stars Fonteno and Ogg.

=== YouTube and internet personality ===
In addition to his traditional acting career, Luke has established a significant presence as a YouTube content creator and livestreamer. He primarily uses his channel to broadcast video game playthroughs, frequently streaming titles such as Grand Theft Auto Online, Max Payne 3, and games from the Resident Evil franchise. His channel has amassed over 560,000 subscribers.

In September 2026, Luke launched the YouTube series The Final Mission, a full playthrough of Grand Theft Auto V ahead of the release of Grand Theft Auto VI. The series serves as a retrospective farewell to the game and frequently features guest appearances from several of his former co-stars.

== Personal life ==
Luke has been married to his wife Amy Sax since 1997. Together, they have a son.

On November 23, 2023, Luke was swatted during a Thanksgiving livestream of Grand Theft Auto Online on his YouTube channel. While some fans accused Rockstar Games of failing to protect players' IP addresses, Luke refuted these claims and attributed the incident to his personal information being previously leaked online. In December 2025, on a livestream with actor Rob Wiethoff, Luke was swatted again. His conversation with the police was cordial, with both recognizing the frequency of the swatting incidents. That same week, Luke shared a letter on his Instagram from the Department of Justice, which invited him to attend a sentence hearing for a swatter related to his case.

Luke is deaf in his right ear.

== Filmography ==
=== Film ===
Year	Title	Role	Notes
1984	The Bear	Football Player	
1991	Rover Dangerfield	Raffles	Voice only, supporting role
1996	The Nutty Professor	Construction Worker	Uncredited
1999	Citation of Merit	Sergeant Smith	Short film
2017	American Gothic	Bill	
2024	Order for Ben	Dad	Short film

=== Television ===
Year	Title	Role	Notes
1988	Win, Lose or Draw	Himself	Game show contestant
1992	Angel Street	Officer	Episode: "The Blonde in the Pond"
1994	Guiding Light	Sheriff	2 episodes
1995	NYPD Blue	Lawyer	Episode: "Cold Heaters"
1996	Murder One	Conspiracy Guy	Episode: "Chapter Eleven"
1996	Renegade	Andy Warwick	Episode: "The Milk Carton Kid"
1997	On the Line	Officer Al	Television film
1997	The Burning Zone	2nd Officer	Episode: "Critical Mass"
1997	High Incident	Gary Butterworth	Episode: "Remote Control"
1999	General Hospital	Body Guard	2 episodes
1999	City Guys	Lonnie Collins	Episode: "Miracle on 134th Street and Lexington Avenue"
2000	The Pretender	David Arnold	Episode: "Junk"
2000	JAG	Senior Chief Petty Officer Bracken	Episode: "Drop Zone"
2000	The Huntress	Detective Ellard	Episode: "The Kid"
2000	Diagnosis Murder	Timmons	Episode: "The Patient Detective"
2002; 2003; 2013	Law & Order: Special Victims Unit	Mr. Wilmont; Roger Swanson; Mr. Thurber	Season 3: "Popular"; Season 4: "Mercy"; Season 15: "Surrender Benson"
2002–2005	All My Children	Fire Chief / Private Investigator	3 episodes
2004	Third Watch	Ron Connelly	Episode: "Greatest Detectives in the World"
2005	As the World Turns	Detective Langstorm	2 episodes
2005	Jonny Zero	Officer Muncie	Episode: "To Serve and to Protect"
2005	Law & Order	Ken Cosgrove	Episode: "New York Minute"
2009	Katana	Executive	Episode: "Pilot"
2013	Boardwalk Empire	Boorish Man	Episode: "All In"
2015	Unfiltered	Randolph Wiley	Lead role, unreleased
2024	Reasonable Doubt	Coach Powell	Episode: "This Can't Be Life"
2026	Tulsa King	John E. Mehlo	2 episodes: "Square One," "Racket Club"

=== Video games ===
Year	Title	Role	Notes
2013	Grand Theft Auto V	Michael De Santa	Voice and motion capture
2018	Red Dead Redemption 2	Moonshiner	Motion capture, voice dubbed over by other actor
2025	Grand Theft Auto Online	Michael De Santa	Voice and motion capture; "A Safehouse in the Hills" DLC

=== Commercials ===
Year	Title	Role	Notes	Ref.
2024-2025	Asus	Travel Agent	Republic of Gamers	

== Accolades ==
Year	Nominee/work	Award	Result
2014	Grand Theft Auto V	Behind the Voice Actors Award for Best Vocal Ensemble in a Video Game	Nominated
