= Meeno Peluce =

Dutch-born American photographer and former child actor

- Born: Miro Fiore Peluce; February 26, 1970 (age 56); Amsterdam, Netherlands
- Education: UC Santa Cruz
- Occupations: Photographer; actor
- Years active: 1977–present
- Spouse: Ilse Ackermann
- Children: 2
- Relatives: Soleil Moon Frye (half-sister)
- Website: meenophoto.com

Miro Fiore "Meeno" Peluce (born February 26, 1970) is a Dutch-American photographer and actor.

== Life and career ==
Peluce was born in Amsterdam, Netherlands, the son of Sondra Londy, a Jewish-American personal manager and caterer, and Floyd Peluce, a certified public accountant. He has one half-sister, actress Soleil Moon Frye, whose father was actor Virgil Frye.

Peluce made guest appearances on television shows during the 1970s and early 1980s, including Starsky & Hutch, The Jeffersons, Kojak, Benson, The Love Boat, Diff'rent Strokes, The Incredible Hulk, Happy Days, The A-Team, Silver Spoons, Manimal, Remington Steele, Scarecrow and Mrs. King, and on Punky Brewster with his half-sister (who played the titular character). Among his regular television roles were Tanner Boyle in The Bad News Bears, Daniel Best in Best of the West, and as history prodigy Jeffrey Jones in Voyagers!. He appeared in the pilot episode of the M*A*S*H spin-off W*A*L*T*E*R with Gary Burghoff, but the series was never picked up.

He has worked as a writer and director. He appeared in several television films, including The Ghost of Flight 401, Night Cries, Fast Friends, and World War III. He starred in the original 1979 theatrical release of The Amityville Horror as one of the Lutz children, and also appeared in the 1981 horror film Don't Go Near the Park. Peluce also appeared in the music video for "The Last in Line" by the group Dio.

Peluce attended UC Santa Cruz and worked as a history teacher at Hollywood High School in the 1990s. He returned to film during 1998, co-writing and co-producing Wild Horses (also titled Lunch Time Special) with sister Soleil Moon Frye, and in 2001 when he appeared in Alex in Wonder (also titled Sex and a Girl).

== Filmography ==
Year	Title	Role	Notes
1977	Starsky & Hutch	Guy Mayer	S3 E7
1978	Kojak	Christopher	S5 E18, "Halls of Terror"
1978	The Incredible Hulk	The Boy	S2 E1, "Married"
1979	Don't Go Near the Park	Nick	
1979	The Amityville Horror	Matt Lutz	
1979	The Bad News Bears	Tanner Boyle	Series regular, 26 episodes over 2 seasons
1980	The Jeffersons	Billy	S7 E8 "All I Want for Christmas"
1980	Benson	Alexei	S1 E18 "Checkmate"
1982	Voyagers!	Jeffrey Jones	Series star, 1 season of 20 episodes
1982	Best of the West	Daniel Best	Series regular, 1 season of 22 episodes
1983	The A-Team	Joey Tataro	S1 E4, "Pros and Cons"
1983	Scarecrow and Mrs. King	Aleksei Kalnikov	S1 E5, "The ACM Kid"
1984	W*A*L*T*E*R	Elston Krennick	TV Pilot
1984	Remington Steele	Jacky	S3 E7 "A Pocketful of Steele"
1984	Silver Spoons	Toby Andrews	S2 E20 "Spare the Rod"
2001	Alex in Wonder	Eric the Hippie	

== Bibliography ==
- Holmstrom, John. The Moving Picture Boy: An International Encyclopaedia from 1895 to 1995. Norwich, Michael Russell, 1996, p. 373.
