= Antony Hamilton =

English-Australian actor, model and dancer (1952–1995)

- Born: Antony Hamilton Smith; 4 May 1952; Liverpool, England
- Died: 29 March 1995 (aged 42); Los Angeles, California, U.S.
- Citizenship: English; Australian
- Education: Scotch College; Australian Ballet School
- Occupations: Actor, model, dancer
- Years active: 1972–1992

Antony Hamilton Smith (4 May 1952 – 29 March 1995) was an English-Australian actor, model and dancer. Hamilton began his career as a ballet dancer with The Australian Ballet before becoming a model. He later transitioned into acting and won his first notable role in the 1984 television film Samson and Delilah. That same year, he took over the male lead role in the series Cover Up after the death of the series' former lead actor, Jon-Erik Hexum. One of Hamilton's best-known roles was that of Max Harte, an agent in the 1988 revival of Mission: Impossible.

In March 1995, Hamilton died of AIDS-related pneumonia at the age of 42.

== Early life ==
Hamilton was born in Liverpool, England and was orphaned when he was two weeks old. He was adopted by Donald Smith and his wife Margaret as a baby and named Antony Hamilton Smith. His adoptive father was a highly-decorated Australian former fighter pilot who fought in World War II and commanded No. 453 Squadron RAAF. His adoptive mother was an English nurse.

When he was three years old, his father retired to South Australia, where Hamilton grew up on a 640-acre sheep farm. From age 10 he attended Scotch College in Adelaide, where he studied dance and ballet and played Australian rules football, cricket, basketball and other sports.

At the age of 15, he won a scholarship at the Australian Ballet School. After leaving school, he began a career as a professional dancer with The Australian Ballet Company where he toured Europe and the Soviet Union for two years.

== Career ==
=== Modelling ===
In 1973, during a dance tour in Europe with The Australian Ballet, he was discovered by Vladimir Bliokh, a world-famous Russian global photojournalist and premier performing-arts photographer. Hamilton stopped dancing at the age of 21 and decided to pursue a career as a model. Hamilton later said, "Dancing was too confining and regimented for me. [...] I became a model not because I was interested in fashion or styles, but because I knew it was a good way to see the world. [...] It gave me independence. [..] The money was good too."

After signing with a London modelling agency, he worked extensively as a model in Europe, America, Asia and Africa, becoming a favourite subject of world-famous photographers as Richard Avedon and Bruce Weber, often working with designers such as Gianni Versace, and frequently appearing in magazines such as Vogue and GQ.

=== Acting ===
While modelling, Hamilton began taking acting classes in an effort to expand his career. His first major role was as Samson in the 1984 television film Samson and Delilah. Later that year, producers of the crime drama series Cover Up offered Hamilton the leading role after the series' previous star, Jon-Erik Hexum, died after an on-set accident in October 1984. Hamilton had known Hexum, having previously met him at an acting class when they both lived in New York. They shared the same acting coach and competed for the same roles. Both were up for the role in Samson and Delilah, which Hamilton won. Hamilton initially had misgivings about taking the role, but ultimately accepted it.

Producers also had misgivings about having the lead be found out to be a gay man, still taboo in the 1980s. Hamilton's first episode aired on 24 November 1984. After Hexum's death, the series struggled in the ratings. CBS cancelled Cover Up the following year.

After the cancellation of Cover Up, Hamilton was in talks to replace Roger Moore as the new James Bond in the 007 film series. Bond producer Albert R. Broccoli was reportedly hesitant to cast Hamilton as the womanising James Bond because, in real life, Hamilton was gay. Timothy Dalton was ultimately cast as James Bond. In 1986, Hamilton had a small role in the comedy film Jumpin' Jack Flash starring Whoopi Goldberg. He guest-starred on several television series including The Hitchhiker, The Twilight Zone, The Charmings and L.A. Law.

In 1988, Hamilton landed the role of Impossible Missions Force agent Max Harte, a former ANZAC commando, in the 1988 revival of Mission: Impossible. The series aired for two seasons before being canceled due to low ratings in 1990. In 1991, he guest-starred on two episodes of crime drama series P.S. I Luv U. Hamilton's final role was in the 1992 thriller Fatal Instinct.

== Death ==
On 29 March 1995, Hamilton died from AIDS-related pneumonia in Los Angeles. His family requested that contributions be made in his name to AIDS Project Los Angeles. Hamilton was cremated and his ashes were scattered off the coast of Malibu.

== Filmography ==
| Year | Title | Role | Notes |
|---|---|---|---|
| 1979 | Nocturna: Granddaughter of Dracula | Jimmy | Alternative title: Nocturna |
| 1984 | Samson and Delilah | Samson | Television movie |
| 1984–1985 | Cover Up | Jack Striker | 14 episodes |
| 1985 | Mirrors | Gino Rey | Television movie |
| 1986 | Jumpin' Jack Flash | Man in Restaurant | Credited as Anthony Hamilton |
| 1986 | The Hitchhiker | Jim Buckley | Episode: "Man of Her Dreams" |
| 1986 | The Twilight Zone | Simon Locke | Segment: "Nightsong" |
| 1987 | The Charmings | Lionel Davenport III | Episode: "Modern Romance" |
| 1987 | L.A. Law | Dan Sapin | Episode: "The Lung Goodbye" |
| 1988 | Sonny Spoon | | Episode: "Too Good to Be True, Too Good to Get Caught" |
| 1988–1990 | Mission: Impossible | Maxwell Hart | 35 episodes – credited as Tony Hamilton |
| 1988 | Howling IV: The Original Nightmare | Tom | Direct-to-video release |
| 1991 | P.S. I Luv U | Dodger | 2 episodes – credited as Tony Hamilton |
| 1992 | Fatal Instinct | Bill Hook | Credited as Tony Hamilton (final film role) |
