= Samson and Delilah (1984 film) =

- DVD cover
- Genre: Adventure; Fantasy; Action
- Based on: Husband of Delilah by Eric Linklater
- Written by: John Gay
- Directed by: Lee Philips
- Starring: Max von Sydow; Belinda Bauer; Antony Hamilton; Daniel Stern; Victor Mature
- Music by: Maurice Jarre
- Country of origin: United States
- Original language: English

Production
- Executive producer: Gregory Harrison
- Producer: Franklin R. Levy
- Cinematography: Gerry Fisher
- Editor: George Jay Nicholson
- Running time: 95 minutes
- Production company: Catalina Productions

Original release
- Network: ABC
- Release: April 1, 1984

Samson and Delilah is a 1984 television film adaptation of the biblical story of Samson and Delilah directed by Lee Philips and starring Max von Sydow, Belinda Bauer, Antony Hamilton, Daniel Stern and Victor Mature. Mature played Samson in the 1949 film and had a small cameo as the father of Antony Hamilton's Samson. This was his final acting role. Based on the 1962 novel Husband of Delilah by Eric Linklater, Samson and Delilah originally aired on ABC.

== Plot ==
The film is mostly the same as the original Biblical story, but with notable differences such as the expanded and sympathetic role of Delilah (Bauer), the introduction of the garrison commander (Stern) who is friends with Samson (Hamilton), more focus upon Samson's relationship with his first wife, a different handling of the 30 garments bet, and a significant alteration of the climax.

In the original story, maintained in the 1949 film and the 1996 film, Samson only regains his strength after his hair has grown long again, thus allowing him to tear down the Philistine temple. In this movie, however, Samson is taken to the Philistine temple just after his hair has been cut short, and he prays to God to restore his immense strength despite his short hair, and God follows through, allowing Samson enough strength to tear down the stone pillars, thus destroying the temple. Delilah is saved through what looks like the intervention of God. She brings Samson back to his tribe to be buried.

== Cast ==
- Antony Hamilton as Samson
- Belinda Bauer as Delilah
- Angélica Aragón as Nija
- David Byrd as Elon
- David S. Eisner as Arin
- José Ferrer as The High Priest
- Jennifer Holmes as Varinia
- Stephen Macht as Maluck
- Victor Mature as Manoah
- Clive Revill as Raul
- Rene Ruis as The Temple Man
- Maria Schell as Deborah
- Brandon Scott as The Magician
- Daniel Stern as Micah
- Max von Sydow as Sidka

== Production ==
Mature says he told the producer "I'll play Samson's father if the price is right." It was entirely shot in Mexico. Monty Cox trained the male African lion in this production.

== Accolades ==
Year	Award	Result	Category	Recipient
1984	Emmy Award	Nominated	Outstanding Achievement in Hairstyling	Jan Van Uchelen
1985	BAFTA Award	Nominated	Best Short Film	Mark Peploe

== In other media ==
It was spoofed by RiffTrax on September 22, 2023.
