= Jerker =

One-act play by Robert Chesley

Jerker, or The Helping Hand: A Pornographic Elegy with Redeeming Social Value and a Hymn to the Queer Men of San Francisco in Twenty Telephone Calls, Many of Them Dirty (commonly known simply as Jerker) is a 1986 American one-act play by Robert Chesley. The two-character play traces the relationship that develops between a disabled Vietnam veteran, J. R., and a businessman, Bert, two gay men in the beginning years of the AIDS epidemic in the early 1980s, when a diagnosis of AIDS meant an early death from complications of the disease. Although they "meet" only through a series of telephone calls, they grow from being phone sex buddies to caring friends. The play varies from the erotic to emotionally charged moments. "Jerker" can be seen as referring to masturbation and to "tear jerker".

Chesley wrote the play because he believed it was "important to remove the stigma against sex that AIDS has created, and ... to remove the stigma against gay men". Jerker premiered at the Celebration Theatre on July 18, 1986, after previews on July 16 and 17 under the direction of Michael Kearns and starring David Stebbins and Joe Fraser.

The UK Premiere of Jerker was performed in London at the Gate Theatre (London) in 1990 under the direction of Stephen Daldry (assisted by Kevin Knight) with Set Design by Ian MacNeil (scenic designer) with Stevan Rimkus (as JR) and Anton Horowitz as Bert. Jerker has subsequently been considered "one of the most important pieces of gay theater ever created".

Jerker was filmed in 1991, starring Joseph Stachura as J. R. and Tom Wagner as Bert and directed by Hugh Harrison.

Jerker returned to the UK in 2019, running at The King's Head Theatre in London. The play was directed by Ben Anderson, with Tom Joyner as J.R. and Tibu Fortes as Bert.

== Plot ==
Two characters, Bert and J.R., exchange a series of sexually explicit telephone calls after connecting through a brief encounter at a bar where they exchange numbers. The highly pornographic content of the first phone calls abate as the men begin to explore other aspects of themselves and each other. In the final scenes J.R. cannot contact Bert because the latter has died from AIDS. J.R. declares his love for his departed friend.

== Obscenity controversy ==
Jerker was at the center of an obscenity controversy shortly after its premiere, when Pacifica Radio affiliate KPFK broadcast excerpts from the play on August 31, 1986. Larry Poland, a Christian minister, filed a complaint with the Federal Communications Commission the next day. Poland claimed to have tuned into the broadcast accidentally and, upon hearing it, claimed that it "did violence to [him] and [his] family." He continued, "They potentially took away my control of being able to protect my children from learning about certain sexual practices at certain times in their lives." Chesley responded, "Prudery kills, on the radio or anywhere else.... Nobody ever died from being offended by what they see or hear."

The FCC ruled that the broadcast was indecent and possibly obscene. The FCC sanctioned the station and implemented new, more stringent broadcast indecency guidelines.
