= The Bear (1984 film) =

- Theatrical release poster
- Directed by: Richard C. Sarafian
- Written by: Michael Kane
- Produced by: James A. Hearn; Larry G. Spangler
- Starring: Gary Busey; Cynthia Leake; Harry Dean Stanton; D'Urville Martin; Jon-Erik Hexum
- Cinematography: Laszlo George
- Edited by: Robert Florio
- Music by: Bill Conti
- Distributed by: Embassy Pictures
- Release date: September 28, 1984 (U.S.)
- Running time: 110 mins.
- Country: United States
- Language: English
- Box office: $2,700,000

The Bear is a 1984 biopic starring Gary Busey and Jon-Erik Hexum. The film was written by Michael Kane, directed by Richard C. Sarafian, and produced by James A. Hearn and Larry G. Spangler.

== Plot ==
The Bear follows the life of Paul "Bear" Bryant (Busey), head coach of the University of Alabama football team, who died in 1983. Jon-Erik Hexum plays Pat Trammell in the film.

== Cast ==
- Gary Busey as Paul W. "Bear" Bryant
- Jon-Erik Hexum as Pat Trammell
- Scott Campbell as Dennis Goehring
- Robert Craighead as Jack Pardee
- Buddy Farmer as Herman Ball
- Charles Gabrielson as Steve Meilinger
- Ivan Green as Mr. Gallagher
- Steve Greenstein as Joe Namath
- Cary Guffey as Grandson Marc Tyson
- Cynthia Leake as Mary Harmon Bryant
- D'Urville Martin as Billy
- Michael McGrady as Gene Stallings
- Muriel Moore as Miss Vernon
- Owen E. Orr as Ermal Allen
- Michael Prokopuk as Bob Lockett
- Brett Rice as Don Hutson
- Damon Sarafian as Don Watson
- Tod Spangler as Bobby Keith
- Harry Dean Stanton as Coach Frank Thomas
- Carmen Thomas as Mae Martin Bryant Tyson
- William Wesley Neighbors, Jr. as Billy Neighbors
- Ned Luke as Football Player

== See also ==
- List of American football films
