= Hour 25 =

Hour 25 was a radio program focusing on science fiction, fantasy, and science. It was broadcast weekly on Pacifica radio station KPFK in Southern California from 1972 to 2000. In its heyday, Hour 25 featured numerous interviews with famous authors of science fiction and fantasy, in addition to luminaries of the scientific community. On its archival website, there is an extensive archive of older shows featuring interviews with popular authors, including Terry Pratchett, Larry Niven, Laurie R. King, Frank Kelly Freas, and Neil Gaiman.

The program was hosted by Mike Hodel (working with a series of co-hosts) from 1972 to 1986; Hodel was succeeded by Harlan Ellison, who was the regular host in 1986-87. Notable science fiction authors Steven Barnes, Arthur Byron Cover, David Gerrold and J. Michael Straczynski also hosted the show at various times in the 1980s and 1990s.

The show left radio in 2000, but continued as an increasingly erratically-scheduled podcast, hosted by Warren James. Interviews were phased out, the frequency of new shows dropped dramatically, and after about 2006, the show was only heard a few times a year. The final internet broadcast to date occurred in December, 2018.

== History ==
Hour 25 was one of the longest-running science-fiction radio programs, surpassed by only Hour of the Wolf, and surpassing Shockwave Radio Theater's 28-year run. In its first years, Hour 25 functioned almost as a science-fiction "web page" for the Los Angeles area fan base before computer technology made it much simpler to keep up-to-date on news and events in the relatively small world of science-fiction fandom. It was also one of the earliest programs to be taken seriously by both authors and publishers.

Hour 25 was originally hosted by Katherine Calkin and Mitchell Harding, who were quickly joined by Mike Hodel after the first few months. The trio's appreciation for the genre and differing tastes brought a unique quality to the program, which was an eclectic mixture of science-fiction news, reviews, readings, filk music, occasional on-air listener phone calls, interviews, and playing of science-fiction radio shows such as X Minus One and The Hitchhiker's Guide to the Galaxy.

The show went through a number of hosts and can be usefully subdivided into different eras by host tenure:

=== Mike Hodel era (1972-1986) ===
Co-hosts
Katherine Calkin (1972-1976)
Mitchell Harding (1972-1981)
Mel Gilden (1981-1986)

Hour 25 first took to the air in January 1972, and was created by Mitchell Harding, Katherine Calkin, Mike Hodel and Terry Hodel. Though Mike Hodel was involved in the show's creation from the very beginning, he was initially unable to host it due to other commitments, and Hour 25 was originally hosted by Katherine Calkin, with engineer Mitchell Harding serving as de facto co-host, often identifying himself on-air as "John Henry Thong". ("Mitchell Harding" was itself also a pseudonym—his real name was Eugene Loring Ware.) Mike Hodel would join the on-air cast within the first few months, and with a now-permanent trio of co-hosts in place, Hour 25 began to take on its most well-remembered form.

The show took a certain amount of pride in fostering the LA science-fiction community. Terry Hodel, Mike Hodel's wife, maintained and read on the air each week a calendar of science-fiction related events in the Los Angeles area, which, before the internet, was the only way many science-fiction fans learned of conventions and book signings. Hour 25 also adopted a fan-friendly method of operation in Southern California; the outer door of the station was deliberately propped open during the program, allowing fans to come and go as they pleased. Fans would often drop by the station to meet the evening's guests, or to deliver refreshments.

Originally, the three-hour show aired Friday nights from 10:00 PM to 1:00 AM, but when the management at KPFK threatened to cancel the show, the producers were able to negotiate a schedule change. The last hour of the program, which was largely devoted to playing old-time radio shows, was eliminated, and beginning in May 1975, Hour 25 aired on Saturday morning from midnight to 2:00 AM. In October, 1976, the show moved back to its original starting time, Fridays at 10:00 PM, and ended at midnight. It would then continue airing in this timeslot for the next two decades.

As the show became more of a fixture in the LA science-fiction community, noted authors began to make appearances on the show. Theodore Sturgeon was the first author to be interviewed by the show, in 1973; in the years following, Hour 25 interviewed virtually every major writer in the field. One well-known recorded interview was with author Philip K. Dick in 1976, in which Mike Hodel talked with Dick about his new book, A Scanner Darkly, and Dick read some passages which he said were inspired by his own use of drugs. The original recording was over three hours long, but the broadcast version was edited to be much shorter. Some time after being aired, Hodel realized that neither version of the interview could be found in the station archives, but a 75-minute version of the Dick interview is now available and a transcript is held on the Internet Archive.

Hour 25 was also one of the first US radio programs to introduce the American audience to The Hitchhiker's Guide to the Galaxy before NPR gained rights and aired it. It was broadcast as two series of six shows with a "bridge" episode, and was replayed until NPR gained the rights. Hour 25 later featured Douglas Adams as an in-studio guest.

Calkin, one of the show's original creators and co-hosts, departed in 1976 for a position at KUSC, and was not replaced. After co-host/engineer Mitchell Harding departed from Hour 25 in 1981 to take a position at KCRW-FM, Hodel co-hosted the show with science-fiction and television writer Mel Gilden, who was then just beginning his career. At this same time, Harding's engineering duties were taken over by Joe Adams, who would occasionally co-host shows that featured discussions of various comics. Later, Burt Handlesman, who was often affectionately identified on-air as "Burt Handlesman, Crack Engineer", would become the program's engineer and announcer. As well, for several years in the early 1980s, Bill Warren was a once-a-month "media" co-host.

One frequently discussed concept in the show was the "Group Mind", which consisted of all the listeners. Hodel often said there was no topic that some "cell" of the Group Mind wouldn't have information about. Many times members of the "Group Mind" would call in with answers as the show aired, presaging live shows today which have chat rooms for the same function.

Harlan Ellison was a frequent and favorite guest on the program. On August 14, 1976, he was the guest and after explaining what would happen that night he started work on a story. He began with the audience suggesting words and phrases he could use. He picked three and began typing, describing what he was doing and occasionally asking the hosts and audience for help. This continued so long that the host of the following show gave him more air time. The show lasted over three and 1/2 hours, but he was unable to finish the story that night. Ellison came back on August 28 and continued writing. He returned once more on September 4, 1976 and read the completed story, "Hitler Painted Roses."

Ellison later "immortalized" Hour 25 (and some of its staff) in a story, "The Hour That Stretches", which featured the radio show as a central element.

=== Harlan Ellison era (1986-1987) ===
When Mike Hodel became gravely ill in early 1986, Ellison took over co-hosting the show with Mel Gilden. After Mike Hodel died on May 6, 1986, Ellison became the official new co-host on May 9, the memorial program for Mike Hodel. Gilden left the show a month later, leaving Ellison as the sole host. Terry Hodel continued with the show as executive producer, and also continued to maintain and read the calendar listings.

Ellison opened each program by reading vignettes of his own composition while music from the opening credits of Dark of the Sun played in the background. Ellison renamed the program "Mike Hodel's Hour 25", and began closing each show by saying "Goodnight, Mike." As the sole host of Hour 25, Ellison began to find it challenging to create two hours of original content every week. The Harlan Ellison FAQ (which was overseen by Ellison) also mentions that Ellison felt that the people at Pacifica Radio/KPFK were being "less than civil" and "abusive" to him. Ellison left the show after the broadcast of June 19, 1987.

=== J. Michael Straczynski/Larry DiTillio era (1987-1989) ===
Frequent substitute host
David Gerrold (1988-1989)

When Harlan Ellison decided to leave Hour 25, he contacted writer J. Michael Straczynski and asked him to take over the show as its weekly host. Straczynski brought Larry DiTillio on as co-host; the two hosted Hour 25 for a little over two years, although David Gerrold was a frequent substitute host during this era. The show continued to interview such guests as Ray Bradbury, Norman Corwin, John Carpenter, Dean Koontz, Walter Koenig, Neil Gaiman and scores of other writers, directors and actors.

=== Rotating hosts era (1989-1992) ===
Beginning in 1989, the show moved to using a series of rotating hosts. The hosts sometimes worked solo, more often in pairs or even trios with little week-to-week continuity. Amongst the regular pool of hosts and co-hosts during this era were Straczynski, DiTillio, Arthur Byron Cover, Steven Barnes and Warren W. James. Author David Gerrold hosted one show solo and co-hosted at least one show with DiTillio during this era, though he was not a regular host.

In 1992, Straczynski, DiTillio and Cover all left Hour 25 due to creative differences with KPFK station management—particularly with regard to language used on the air, and management's request for advance notice of the program's content. This left only James and Barnes as hosts.

=== Warren James era (1992-2018) ===
Regular substitute host
Steven Barnes (1992-1995)

As of 1992, the show was now hosted primarily by Warren James, with Steven Barnes taking over as host approximately once a month. After a few years, Barnes left the show to move to the Pacific Northwest, leaving James as the show's sole host, although Jeff Laube, Nick Smith and Sandy Rymer occasionally (and individually) co-hosted the show with James on an informal basis. A special 25th anniversary show aired in January, 1997, and featured several co-hosts from years past, including Mitchell Harding, Katherine Calkin, Mel Gilden and J. Michael Straczynski.

In 1998, the show was cut from its longstanding two-hour running time to one hour. Terry Hodel continued as the executive producer of the show (and as the presenter of the calendar listings) until her death in March 1999. At this time, Suzanne Gibson became producer, and also took over as the compiler and presenter of the calendar listings. Gibson also frequently functioned as an unofficial co-host, participating in interview segments and story readings.

==== Podcast era (2000-2018) ====
The show left KPFK in the fall of 2000, and became a podcast at that time. (Note that this development predated the creation of the actual word "podcast" by four years.) With the time restrictions of fitting into a specific radio station timeslot lifted, Hour 25 episodes now lasted anywhere from 60 to 150 minutes, depending on the subject matter and material available for broadcast. After the first few weeks as a podcast, calendar listings were no longer read aloud but were instead posted on the show's website — although even this practice petered out in early 2002.

The show kept to a weekly schedule through mid-2002, after which the frequency with which new episodes were produced started to decline precipitously. Dedicated author interviews became rare: after 2006, Hour 25 produced between 1 and 6 new episodes each year, usually centered around reports from Loscon, or readings of Christmas and/or Hallowe'en-themed science fiction stories. After 2008, episode lengths were consistently kept to under an hour, and Loscon reports were discontinued after 2010.

Though no official announcement was ever made about the demise of Hour 25, the show ceased production at the end of 2018. The final Hour 25 podcast was a series of Christmas readings posted in December 2018.

== Theme song ==
The show's opening theme was, for much of its run, "Needles & Bones" from Vangelis's 1975 album Heaven and Hell. "Jupiter, the Bringer of Jollity" from Holst's The Planets was also used, as well as Mike Oldfield's Tubular Bells and other mixed material. The original opening was created by Joe Adams in 1973, a sound effect collage based on "Dizzy Dizzy" by the Europop group Can. Later versions (under Mike Hodel and then Warren James) were created by Burt Handelsman (BHCE).
