= Robert Chesley Award =

The Robert Chesley Award was an annual literary award, presented by Publishing Triangle to honour drama works by playwrights in the LGBTQ community. First presented in 1994, the award was named in memory of playwright Robert Chesley. The award was discontinued in 2008.

== Winners ==
Award winners
Year	Category	Recipient	Ref.
1994	Lifetime Achievement	Doric Wilson	
1994	Playwriting	Lisa Kron	
1995	Playwriting	Victor Lodato	
1996	Lifetime Achievement	Robert Patrick	
1996	Lifetime Achievement	Susan Miller	
1997	Playwriting	Paula Vogel	
1998	Playwriting	Chay Yew	
1999	Playwriting	Madeleine Olnek	
2000	Playwriting	Jeff Weiss	
2001	Lifetime Achievement	María Irene Fornés	
2002	Emerging Talent	Christopher Shinn	
2002	Emerging Talent	Shelia Callaghan	
2003	Playwriting	Alvin Carmines, Jr.	
2003	Playwriting	H.M. Koutoukas	
2004	Playwriting	Rebecca Ranson	
2004	Playwriting	Jane Shepard	
2005	Emerging Playwright	Jorge Ignacio Cortiñas	
2005	Lifetime Achievement	Michael Kearns	
2006	Playwriting	Kathleen Warnock	
2006	Playwriting	Megan Terry	
2007	Emerging Playwright	Chris Weikel	
2007	Lifetime Achievement	Eric Bentley	
