= Don't Go Near the Park =

1981 American horror film by Lawrence D. Foldes

- Poster art
- Directed by: Lawrence D. Foldes
- Written by: Lawrence D. Foldes
- Story by: Linwood Chase
- Produced by: Lawrence D. Foldes
- Starring: Aldo Ray; Meeno Peluce; Tamara Taylor; Robert Gribbin; Barbara Monker; Linnea Quigley; Chris Riley
- Cinematography: William DeDiego
- Edited by: Dan Perry
- Music by: Chris Ledesma
- Production company: Star Cinema
- Distributed by: Cardinal IV Film Distributors; Cannon Films
- Release date: September 11, 1981
- Running time: 80 minutes
- Country: United States
- Language: English
- Budget: $110,000
- Box office: $390,000

Don't Go Near the Park is a 1979 American supernatural horror film directed by Lawrence D. Foldes, and starring Aldo Ray, Meeno Peluce, Tamara Taylor, Robert Gribbin, Barbara Bain, and Linnea Quigley. Its plot follows a brother and sister, both cursed in prehistoric times, who remain on earth and must eat the entrails of young people to regain their youth; in an attempt to break their curse and achieve immortality, the brother conceives a child as a virginal sacrifice.

Filmed in Los Angeles, Don't Go Near the Park was then-19-year-old Foldes' directorial debut. He had previously produced the commercially successful exploitation film Malibu High (1979). The film was released theatrically in September 1981. It gained notoriety when it was successfully prosecuted for obscenity in the United Kingdom and placed on the "video nasty" list due to its violent content. In the intervening years, it was released on the home video market under several alternate titles, such as Night Stalker and Curse of the Living Dead.

Critical response to the film was largely negative, and it attracted commentary in subsequent decades for its themes of cannibalism, incest, and pedophilia. In 2006, Dark Sky Films released a DVD featuring the original U.S. theatrical cut.

== Plot ==
After being cursed by their mother, Petranella, Tra and Gar, a caveman brother and sister, are forced to live by preying on young people, devouring their entrails to retain their youth. The nature of the curse allows it to be lifted after 12,000 years— an entire cycle of the zodiac— after which one of the siblings must conceive a child to use as a virgin sacrifice to achieve immortality.

Millennia later, in 1965, the siblings subsist by stalking young people in a L.A. park, consuming their entrails to imbibe their life force. As the 12,000 years end, Gar plans to conceive a child. Using the name Mark, he rents a room in the home of a beautiful young woman and soon marries her before conceiving a daughter, Bondi. Mark becomes obsessed with Bondi's welfare, and his attention to her causes his marriage to disintegrate in the intervening years. On Bondi's 16th birthday, Mark gives her an ancient amulet from his mother. After promising not to, Bondi's father argues with her mother and leaves the house during the birthday party, abandoning them.

Bondi subsequently runs away, hitching a ride with three adult male hippies. When they attempt to gang rape her in the back of the van, Bondi invokes her father, clutching to the amulet, which begins glowing. The van begins to drive out of control, crashing off a rural bridge before bursting into flames; Bondi survives, however, transported away from the crash. Bondi wanders into an abandoned house near the park, where Tra, withering from her lack of sustenance, resides in seclusion. Bondi is unaware that Tra, who calls herself Patty, is her aunt. Tra immediately recognizes Bondi upon seeing the amulet.

Bondi is met by Nick, an 8-year-old boy who has been taken in by Patty and sees her as a grandmother figure. She also meets Cowboy, another runaway who lives there. Bondi is initially terrified by Patty's grotesque appearance, but Nick and Cowboy assure her that she is harmless and that she uses her appearance to scare other people away. Cowboy explains that Patty dons a cloak to appear as a witch and has concocted a tall tale about the land suffering "Petranella's Curse" to keep people away.

Meanwhile, while selling flowers on the street, Nick meets Taft, a local writer and historian who befriends him. In conversations, Taft explains the dark history of the local park and the centuries-old deaths there, warning Nick not to go near it.

Late at night, Nick sees Patty enter the park wearing a mask and follows her. He watches from a distance as she strangles, disembowels, and cannibalizes a female victim. When she removes the mask, her youthful appearance is restored. Horrified, Nick flees back to the house to notify Bondi and Cowboy, but finds the house empty.

Meanwhile, having been drugged by Patty, Bondi awakens in a cave alongside Cowboy. She is confronted by her father, who attempts to assault her, but Patty intervenes and stops him. After they fight, a fire breaks out in the cave, and Patty urges Bondi to swallow the amulet, which she does. Upon doing so, Bondi becomes possessed by Petranella, taking on her withered appearance. Petranella reanimates the corpses of Patty and Mark's victims, which they have stored in the cave, and forces them to kill and consume Mark and Patty.

After Petranella's spirit leaves Bondi's body, Bondi and Cowboy flee and find Nick in one of the tunnels. They escape through a crumbling cave wall with the help of Taft, who has been searching for Nick in the park. The three spend the night at Taft's home and return to visit the ranch where they have been living with Patty. Upon arriving, they are notified by a city official that the house is being demolished. Pondering where to go, the three venture wander until they find a playground. Nick climbs a slide and asks Bondi to push him down. Instead, Bondi begins to dig her fingernails into his abdomen to disembowel him. As he screams, the camera freezes on her smiling.

== Cast ==
- Aldo Ray as Taft
- Meeno Peluce as Nick
- Tamara Taylor as Bondi
  - Lara Morann as Bondi At 8 Years
- Barbara Bain as Patty / Tra / Griffith's Wife / Petranella (credited as Barbara Monker)
- Robert Gribbin as Mark / Gar (credited as Crackers Phinn)
- Linnea Quigley as Bondi's Mother
- Chris Riley as Cowboy
- Earl Statler as Griffith

== Analysis and themes ==
Film scholars David Kerekes and David Slater note that Don't Go Near the Park contains various themes of cannibalism, incest, and "subliminal paedophilia." Kerekes and Slater cite several sequences that allude to inappropriate sexual conduct, including the scene in which 8-year-old Nick attempts to grope Bondi's breasts while she is sleeping. They also note that the camera provides views up actress Tammy Taylor's skirts.

Kerekes and Slater also suggest that the character of Taft, an aging man who strikes a friendship with the young Nick, alludes to a pedophilic relationship: "He takes the young boy home, where he lives alone, and invites him to stay with him as his special friend. Towards the end of the film, the three youngsters—Cowboy, Bondi and Nick—are all sleeping half-naked in Taft's apartment while he looks on, smiling."

== Production ==
=== Concept ===
Don't Go Near the Park was co-written and directed by first-time director Lawrence D. Foldes, who was 19 years old at its filming. Before making the film, Foldes had produced the exploitation film Malibu High (1979), which had been a major box office success. The story, conceived by Linwood Chase, was partly inspired by a series of disappearances (primarily of children) that had occurred over the 20th century in Griffith Park in Los Angeles.

=== Casting ===
The film marked actress Linnea Quigley's first major role, and she was cast based on modeling photos Foldes had come across. Many of the actors in the film were credited under pseudonyms; Robert Gribbin, who portrayed Mark, is credited as Crackers Phinn, while Barbara Bain, who played Patty, was credited as Barbara Monker. Aldo Ray, an established film veteran, was cast as Taft, the writer who befriends the runaway youth in the film.

=== Filming ===
Principal photography took place in Los Angeles, California in 1979, under the working title Sanctuary of Evil. Filming occurred primarily in Griffith Park, as well as the Paramount Ranch. The cave sequences were filmed in the Bronson Caves in Griffith Park. Foldes makes a cameo appearance in the film as one of the three young men who attempt to rape Bondi. The film's budget was around $200,000. Robert A. Burns served as the film's art director and helped craft some of the special effects.

Star Quigley recalled the shoot: "I sent my picture in, and they called me and I read for the part of this woman that bears a child. They’re supposed to age me, like she’s all grown up and everything, and I had a real babyface then, but they used the worst makeup, and I just looked like I had stipple on. It was crazy. It looked so bad. The movie was terrible."

== Release ==
=== Box office ===
Don't Go Near the Park was released theatrically on September 11, 1981, in Florida. The film screened in various U.S. cities throughout the remainder of the year, including Montgomery, Alabama, and Phoenix, Arizona. The film opened in Fresno, California in December 1981. By 1984, the film had grossed $390,000 at the U.S. box office.

Director Foldes stated in 1983 that the Cannon Group had acquired further distribution rights to the film (as well as Foldes' subsequent feature, Skycopter) for regional screenings, though a Cannon representative stated at that time that "there isn't much going on with either movie."

=== Home media ===
In the United Kingdom, Don't Go Near the Park was successfully prosecuted for obscenity and placed on the "video nasty" list, though it was subsequently removed. The film was released on VHS in the United States under various alternate titles: In 1986, Thriller Video released it under the title Night Stalker, and it was re-released in 1989 by Electric Productions under the title Curse of the Living Dead.

In 2006, Dark Sky Films released a special edition DVD of the film. This same year, the film was passed uncut in the United Kingdom by the British Board of Film Classification.

== Reception ==
Don't Go Near the Park mainly received negative reviews upon its release. Candice Russell of the Fort Lauderdale News panned the film, criticizing its "slipshod" camerawork and production values, adding: "Everything about this exploitation picture is cut-rate, from the fakey-looking wigs to special effects worthy of a freshman filmmaker. The acting is disastrous and director-producer Foldes knows it, so he tries to substitute intense closeups for a lack of dramatic feeling, to no avail." Joe Bob Briggs, however, praised the film as the best among similarly titled films such as Don't Look in the Basement (1973).

Todd Martin from HorrorNews.net panned the film, calling it "a goofy, boring, ridiculous mess of a film that is just pretty much pointless in every possible way." Ian Jane from DVD Talk called it "truly terrible and almost unwatchable", criticizing the film's acting, plot, lack of sense, and poorly executed gore scenes. The Terror Trap awarded the film half a star out of four, calling it "terrible", and panned the acting, clumsy pacing, and disjointed plot.

The film wasn't without its supporters. Dan Budnik from Bleeding Skull! liked the film, calling it, "Strange and compelling and occasionally incredibly stupid".
