= Robert Chesley =

American dramatist (1943–1990)

- Born: March 22, 1943; Jersey City, New Jersey, U.S.
- Died: December 5, 1990 (aged 47); San Francisco, California, U.S.
- Education: Reed College (B.A., 1965)

Robert Chesley (March 22, 1943, Jersey City, New Jersey – December 5, 1990, San Francisco, California) was an American playwright, theater critic and musical composer.

== Early life and education ==
Chesley was born in Jersey City, New Jersey to a socialite mother and physician father. When his parents divorced in 1948, he, his mother, and his sister moved to Pasadena, California. Chesley later said he knew he was gay by the time he was four, although he did not have the language to express this. He experienced bullying throughout his childhood, but found solace and friends through music.

He earned his B.A. in music from Reed College in 1965. He wrote his thesis, "A Study of Tonal Structure and Form in Three Works of Prokofiev," under the advisement of Mark DeVoto.

== Career ==
After graduating, Chesley, who was still in the closet, married his first cousin, Jean Rusch. The couple settled in upstate New York, and Chesley taught at the Dutchess County Day School, an all girls' private school in Millbrook. In 1975, he had sex with a man for the first time. This experience pushed Chesley to divorce Rusch and to come out at work. He also began organizing an LGBTQ group in Poughkeepsie and writing up proposals for a local gay community center. Chesley, who was growing tired of teaching and wanted to become more involved with the gay rights movement, then resigned and moved to New York City.

While living in upstate New York between 1965 and 1975, Chesley composed the music to over five dozen songs and choral works, chiefly to texts by poets such as Emily Dickinson, Willa Cather, James Agee, Walter de la Mare, Gertrude Stein and Walt Whitman. His instrumental works include the score to a 1972 film by Erich Kollmar.

During his year living in New York City, Chesley began publishing articles and criticism in Gay Community News, The Advocate, Gaysweek, the San Francisco Review of Books, the San Francisco Bay Guardian, and the New York Native. He also co-founded the Three-Dollar Bill Theater.

In 1976 he moved to San Francisco and became theater critic at the San Francisco Bay Guardian, during its golden period when composer-actor Robert DiMatteo was also on the staff as film critic. In 1980 Theatre Rhinoceros produced Chesley's first one-act, Hell, I Love You.

In December 1981, he wrote a series of letters challenging gay writer and activist Larry Kramer in the New York Native. Among his concerns were Kramer's role as an alarmist and his claims that the sexual habits of gay men in New York were connected to Kaposi's Sarcoma. In Chesley's letters, he asserted that Kramer's works had an ulterior motive, to associate gay promiscuity with death and stating that Kramer's warnings represented "homophobia and anti-eroticism."

In 1984, his play Night Sweat was produced in New York City, becoming one of the first produced full-length plays to deal with AIDS.

On August 31, 1986, his two-character play, Jerker, aired on the Pacifica Radio station KPFK's IMRU Program. Its frank sexual language immediately stirred controversy; later that year the FCC rewrote its rules governing the broadcast of "questionable" works, citing Jerker as the test case.

In total, Chesley wrote 10 full-length and 21 one-act plays. Several works were premiered posthumously and several of his major plays have been published.

== Personal life ==
While living in San Francsco, Chesley formed a relationship with financial advisor Gene Weber. The two were involved in the leather scene.

== Death and legacy ==
Chesley was diagnosed with HIV in 1988. On December 10, 1990, he died of AIDS-related complications at the Mt. Zion Hospital in San Francisco, at the age of 47.

The Robert Chesley Award for Lesbian and Gay Playwriting, given annually by Publishing Triangle, is named in his honor. The Robert Chesley/Victor Bumbalo Foundation was established in 1993 to support playwrights of LGBT theatre, and has been in partnership with the Helene Wurlitzer Foundation in Taos, New Mexico, since 2009 to annually award a residency at the Foundation and a stipend to a selected playwright.

== Plays ==
- Beatitudes (1984)
- Come Again: An Entertainment During The Siege (1987)
- Dog Plays (1989)
- Wild (Person, Tense) Dog
- The Deploration of Rover
- Hold
- Happy V.D.
- April First
- Arbor Day
- Dear Friends and Gentle Hearts
- The Scream
- A Christmas Card
- Hell, I Love You and Breaking Up: Fragments (1981)
- Madeleine de Lucien (1985)
- Jerker, or The Helping Hand: A Pornographic Elegy with Redeeming Social Value and a Hymn to the Queer Men of San Francisco in Twenty Telephone Calls, Many of Them Dirty (1986)
- A Dog's Life
- Maggie's Play
- Somebody's Little Boy
- The Lost Doll
- Laughter and Tears
- Et Tu, Lesbo
- Nocturnes (1983)
- Night Sweat (1983)
- Pigman: A Comedy in Three Acts (1985–6)
- Private Theatricals: Morning, Noon & Night (1990)
- Stray Dog Story : An Adventure In Ten Scenes (1981)
