= The Starship Trap =

1993 novel by Mel Gilden

- Author: Mel Gilden
- Language: English
- Genre: Science fiction
- Publisher: Pocket Books
- Publication date: April 1993
- Publication place: United States
- Media type: Print (paperback)
- Pages: 242 pp
- ISBN: 0-671-79324-1 (first edition, paperback)
- OCLC: 27744537
- Preceded by: Shell Game
- Followed by: Windows on a Lost World

The Starship Trap is a Star Trek: The Original Series novel written by Mel Gilden.

== Plot ==
While traveling to an important diplomatic meeting, the USS Enterprise is attacked by a Klingon warship. Managing to secure a truce, Kirk discovers the Klingon captain thought he was gaining revenge for vanishing Klingon ships. Kirk and his crew soon learn that ships from all over known space are vanishing. They race to stop the phenomenon before interstellar war breaks out.
