= Maggie LePique =

American radio hostess

Maggie LePique (born Margaret LePique on January 29, 1964) is a prominent jazz and radio program host based in Los Angeles, California. She gained recognition as a modern jazz DJ on KCUR-FM, NPR 89.3, in Kansas City during the 1980s, playing primarily Kansas City Jazz and bebop to listeners across the midwest Plains. LePique's ability to feature and interview many of the original modern jazz pioneers on her programs drew the attention of famous Jazz Masters.

LePique soon expanded her presence on the bebop scene to Los Angeles and Hollywood, becoming a well-known advocate and friend to many of the original creators of this unique American art form. In the 1990s, she made her mark as a LA traffic reporter on commercial AM and FM radio dials, winning the coveted LA Broadcaster's Award for her live coverage of the Los Angeles riots of 1992.

LePique was also a regular contributor to the popular radio program The Real Don Steele on KRTH-FM (K-Earth 101), engaging in quick-witted banter and delivering with an on-your-toes, street-smart agility that endeared her to LA listeners. She later returned to her true passion, music DJing, and became the music director for Pacifica Radio's KPFK-FM 90.7 in Los Angeles.

LePique's return to radio took on new dimensions and meaning as she embraced world music in addition to jazz. She hosted KPFK's popular Global Village show from 2003–2009 and continues to be a strong voice on the station, hosting special programs that pay tribute to artists such as John Lennon and Bob Dylan. Her latest venture is her podcast "Profiles With Maggie LePique," which offers an in-depth look at the lives and legacies of musicians and artists who defined a uniquely creative era, breaking boundaries and finding new influences while ushering in social and political change.

On November 25, 2024 LePique assumed the role of interim General Manager at the Pacifica Foundation southern California radio station KPFK-FM 90.7 fm Los Angeles where she had been serving as music director.
