= Jane Shepard =

American playwright

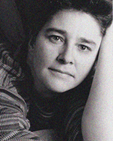

Jane Shepard (born 1958) is an American playwright, filmmaker and cartoonist. Shepard was born in Galesburg, Illinois.

== Early life ==
Shepard's father, Paul Shepard, was an American environmentalist and author of the 13 books which have become landmark texts in the ecology movement.

Shepard grew up in Boulder, Colorado, and trained as an actor, graduating from the American Academy of Dramatic Arts in 1978 before turning to writing.

== Works ==
She is best known for writing the Showtime original movie Freak City, which was nominated for a Writers Guild of America Award (2000) for Best Screenplay, Long Form; and for her book of plays Kickass Plays for Women. Three of the short plays included in that collection made their Off-Broadway debut in New York in 2016 under the collective title "COMMENCING", produced by Ethikos Productions.

== Awards ==
A member of Circle Repertory Company before its decline, her play productions in New York City have included Eating the Dead; Ducks Crossing; and her one-woman autobiographical comedy The Idiot's Guide to the Brain, for which she received the Sloan Foundation Fellowship for plays on the theme of science and technology.

Other awards include the Frank Pisco Playwrighting Commission (2007); the Robert Chesley Award (2005); the Berrilla Kerr Playwrighting Award (2003); the Jane Chambers Award (2001) for COMMENCING; New York Foundation for the Arts Fellowships in both playwrighting and screenwriting (1996, 2002); and a Writer's Guild Foundation Fellowship (1985).

She has written and directed a number of short films, including the 16mm film Nine, which received an Honorable Mention Award from the Rochester Film Festival, and "Earning the Day" a comedy on dealing with our self-critical voices. Also a cartoonist, her drawings have appeared in such national publications as The American Review, And Baby, and Grand Slam baseball magazine, and on theatrical posters.
