= KPFK =

Pacifica radio station in Los Angeles

- Los Angeles, California; United States
- Broadcast area: Southern California
- Frequency: 90.7 MHz
- Branding: KPFK 90.7 FM

Programming
- Languages: English; Spanish
- Format: Free-form; Progressive
- Affiliations: Pacifica Radio

Ownership
- Owner: Pacifica Foundation

History
- First air date: July 26, 1959
- Call sign meaning: Pacifica

Technical information
- Licensing authority: FCC
- Facility ID: 51252
- Class: B
- ERP: 110,000 watts
- HAAT: 863.0 meters (2,831.4 ft)
- Transmitter coordinates: 34°13′45″N 118°4′6.2″W
- Translator: See § Translators and booster
- Repeater: See § Translators and booster

Links
- Public license information: Public file; LMS
- Webcast: Listen live
- Website: www.kpfk.org

KPFK (90.7 FM) is a listener-sponsored radio station based in North Hollywood, California, which serves Southern California. It was the second of five stations in the non-commercial, listener-sponsored Pacifica Radio network.

KPFK 90.7 FM began broadcasting in April 1959, 12 years after the Pacifica Foundation was created by pacifist Lewis Hill, and 10 years after the network's flagship station, KPFA, was founded in Berkeley. KPFK also broadcasts on booster KPFK-FM1 along the Malibu coast, K258BS (99.5 MHz) in China Lake, K254AH (98.7 MHz) in Isla Vista and K229BO 93.7 MHz in Rancho Bernardo, San Diego.

With its 110,000-watt main transmitter atop Mount Wilson, KPFK is one of the most powerful FM stations in the western United States. The station can be heard from the California/Mexico border to Santa Barbara to Ridgecrest/China Lake. A second 10-watt translator is licensed in Isla Vista, California, a census-designated place outside Santa Barbara. The transmitter for that station is located atop Gibraltar Peak, allowing its broadcast to be heard over a large portion of southern Santa Barbara County.

== Funding ==
The station is part of the Pacifica Network which has 5 radio stations besides KPFK, and provides programming to over 200 affiliates.

Operating costs are covered primarily by donations from listener-sponsors and sponsored events. The 501(c)(3) non-profit station runs no paid commercial advertisements or sponsored programming. Memberships at a minimum donation of $25 per year allow participation in the election of Local Station Board members.

Pacifica lost Corporation For Public Broadcasting Funding after 2012 due to not submitting acceptable audited financial statements. This funding was previously spread between the five Pacifica stations.

== Local station board ==
In two years during a three-year cycle, station members and staff elect the Local Station Board as required by the Pacifica Foundation bylaws. The KPFK local station board elects members from its body to the Pacifica Foundation board of directors and has support and advisory duties for the station. The full local station board meets monthly, and committees of the local station board meet on both regular and ad hoc bases.

== Programming ==
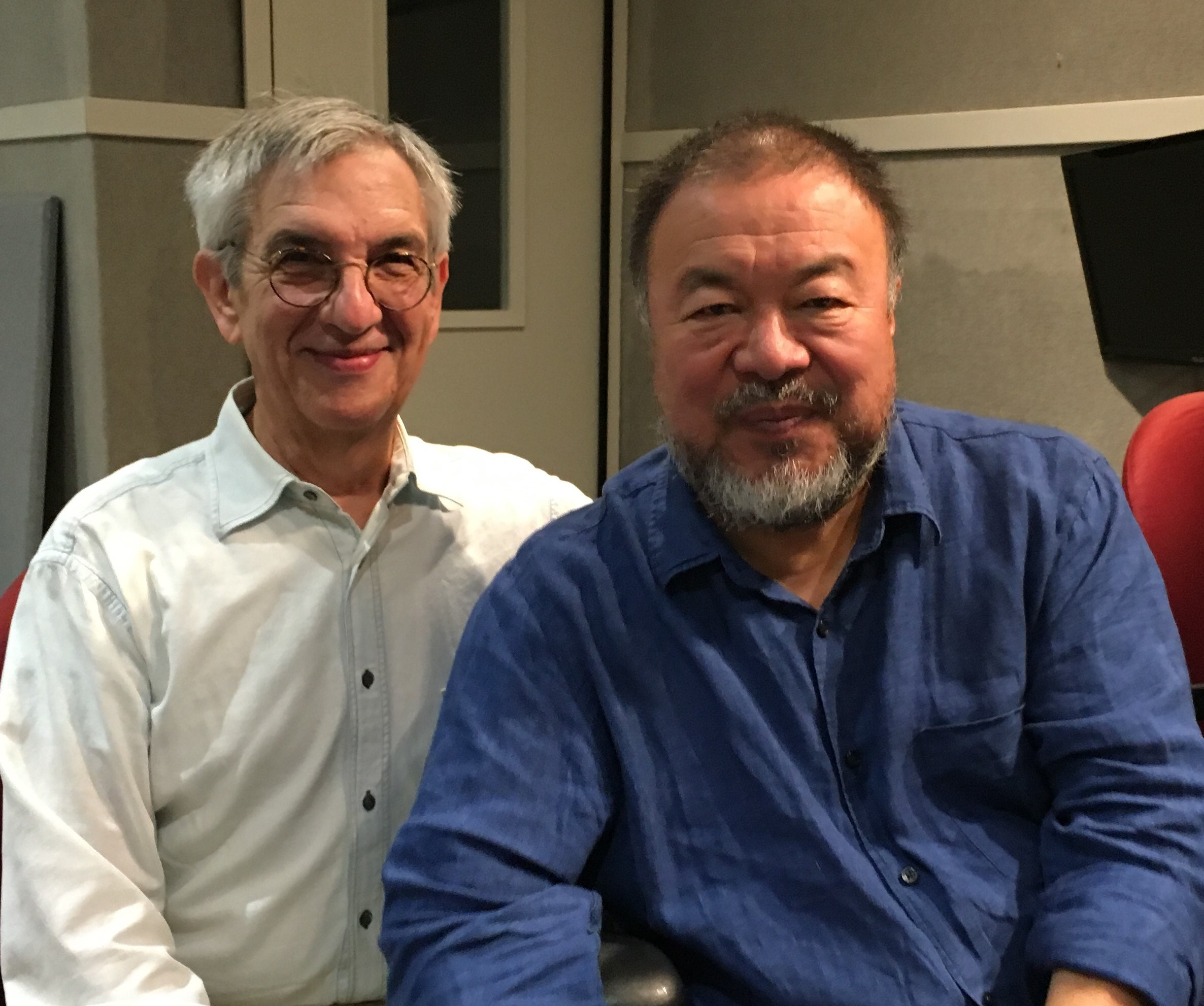
Chinese artist and dissident Ai Weiwei as a guest in historian Jon Wiener's radio show on KPFK, 2017.

Like all Pacifica stations, KPFK has, since its inception run an eclectic schedule of performing arts, public affairs, and news. Many programs are available through the Pacifica Network for rebroadcast to affiliate stations and are streamed for a limited period on the Online Archives.

Maintaining its adherence to Pacifica founder Lew Hill's Mission, KPFK focuses on news, public affairs, and performance of local interest, while blending in nationally and internationally focused programming.

Programming is primarily English language, but includes twenty-two hours broadcast in Spanish five evenings per week, Monday - Thursday, and Saturday.

With the rest of the Pacifica Foundation stations and in accord with the Mission's commitment to dialogue, KPFK maintains community access to the airwaves, which was stated as:

To establish a Foundation organized and operated exclusively for educational purposes no part of the net earnings of which inures to the benefit of any member of the Foundation.

To establish and operate for educational purposes, in such manner that the facilities involved shall be as nearly self-sustaining as possible, one or more radio broadcasting stations licensed by the Federal Communications Commission and subject in their operation to the regulatory actions of the Commission under the Communications Act of 1934, As Amended.

In radio broadcasting operations to encourage and provide outlets for the creative skills and energies of the community; to conduct classes and workshops in the writing and producing of drama; to establish awards and scholarships for creative writing; to offer performance facilities to amateur instrumentalists, choral groups, orchestral groups and music students; and to promote and aid other creative activities which will serve the cultural welfare of the community.{mosimage}

In radio broadcasting operations to engage in any activity that shall contribute to a lasting understanding between nations and between the individuals of all nations, races, creeds and colors; to gather and disseminate information on the causes of conflict between any and all of such groups; and through any and all means compatible with the purposes of this corporation to promote the study of political and economic problems and of the causes of religious, philosophical and racial antagonisms.

In radio broadcasting operations to promote the full distribution of public information; to obtain access to sources of news not commonly brought together in the same medium; and to employ such varied sources in the public presentation of accurate, objective, comprehensive news on all matters vitally affecting the community.

== History ==
KPFK was founded in 1959 as the second station of the Pacifica Foundation. Terry Drinkwater was its first general manager.

In 1960, KPFK won Pacifica's second George Foster Peabody Award for excellence in broadcasting. In 1962, the FCC withheld the license renewals of KPFA, KPFB, and KPFK, pending its investigation into "communist affiliations." Pacifica was never cited (see The Investigator).

In 1963, KPFK ran the first Renaissance fair as a fundraiser called the Renaissance Pleasure Faire and May Market (the event was managed by Theme Events Limited). At the 1964 fair, Art Kunkin distributed The Faire Free Press, a one-shot eight-page tabloid with the "Los Angeles Free Press" logo appearing on an inside page. While the outside pages were a spoof of the Faire's Renaissance theme, featuring cute stories like one about a "ban the crossbow" demonstration, the inside contained legitimate underground community news and reviews. Five thousand copies were printed, of which 1,200 sold at a price of 25 cents. After the Faire ended, Kunkin circulated a brochure to potential investors and found enough backing to start putting out the paper on a regular weekly basis in July 1964. The Los Angeles Free Press was initially produced mostly by unpaid volunteers, many of them were the same people who volunteered at KPFK, where Kunkin had his own political commentary radio show.

Peter Bergman's Radio Free Oz was first broadcast on July 24, 1966. The Firesign Theatre first appeared on Radio Free Oz on November 17, 1966. The Fireside Theatre produced the live radio program Dear Friends on KPFK in 1970–1971. Twenty-one episodes aired between September 16, 1970, and February 17, 1971. Dear Friends was followed with the KPFK show Let's Eat! in 1971 and 1972.

In 1974, Will Lewis, the general manager of the station at the time, famously refused to turn over tapes acquired from the Symbionese Liberation Army after the terrorist group's kidnapping of newspaper heiress Patty Hearst. After repeated requests by the FBI and being subpoenaed, Lewis cited the First Amendment guarantee of freedom of the press to no avail at a grand jury and was sent to federal prison for 15 days at Terminal Island. Lewis was finally released by Supreme Court justice William O. Douglas. Lewis shared a prison cell with controversial LSD guru Timothy Leary. Lewis was just the second media representative to ever be sent to jail on a freedom of the press issue.

Lewis' progressive changes at KPFK during the 1970s turned the Pacifica station into one of the most popular in the nation, where many celebrity activists were able to express their views without censorship from mainstream media. Actors Martin Sheen, Paul Newman, Jane Fonda and her then-politician husband Tom Hayden, who stood trial in the Chicago Seven case, were among many high-profile visitors at the station during Lewis' leadership.

Lewis was a manager ahead of his times. In 1974, he was the first to introduce a radio show produced and hosted exclusively by and for the gay community — "The Great Gay Radio Conspiracy" as Greg Gordon, Enrich Murrello, and Colin McQueen began the program at 11 pm the third Tuesday of every month. This controversial program eventually was referred to as "IMRU," as it created great consternation for a mostly conservative audience. Today, the program is still a fixture on KPFK as the longest-running LBGTQ program some 48 years later.

KPFK was the only full-service public radio station in Los Angeles during the early 1970s. Lewis and the station won awards for its Watergate coverage, including the Golden Mike Award for reporter Mike Hodel.

Jerker, a Robert Chesley play dramatizing the reflections of a man dying of AIDS, aired on KPFK on August 31, 1986. Because it included graphic sexual language, the FCC ruled that it violated an indecency policy.

In 1987, Ladysmith Black Mambazo made their first on-air U.S. radio broadcast on KPFK.

In 1992, CPB Board member Victor Gold targeted KPFK for strident African American programming and controversial speech aired during Black History Month, by filing an FCC complaint.

The first two decades of the 21st century were marked by conflict at the station over programming as well as money worries.

After the Russian Invasion of Ukraine in 2022, the Russian government sponsored networks went off the air in the US. Some of their reporters made the way to KPFK and two other Pacifica stations.

In 2024, it was announced on the air that the station building had been sold to be converted to a recording studio. Provision was made for KPFK to have free access to a portion of the new building for ten years once it was completed. The station broadcast from temperary quarters in Burbank in interim.

By January 2025 the new interim station manager, Maggie LePique revised the line up of political programming. The pro Russia shows, such as the KPFK Rebel Alliance News, were removed from prime listening hours and the progressive shows like Background Briefing with Ian Masters returned. Fringe pro Russia, China, ( and their allies Iran, Syria's Assad, Venezuela's Maduro) podcasts like The Grey Zone with Max Blumenthal and the former Stutnik and Russia Today regulars were played in the early hours of the morning, however.

== Translators and booster ==
In addition to the main station, KPFK is relayed by an additional four translators and one booster to widen its broadcast area.

Call sign	Frequency	City of license	FID	ERP (W)	Class	FCC info	Notes
K258BS	99.5 FM	China Lake, California	28581	9 vertical	D	LMS	—
K254AH	98.7 FM	Isla Vista, California	85653	10 horizontal	D	LMS	—
KPFK-FM1	90.7 FM	Malibu, California	158785	1,500 vertical	D	LMS	Booster
K229BO	93.7 FM	Rancho Bernardo, Etc., California	86285	10 vertical	D	LMS	—
K212FA	90.3 FM	Temple City, California	90605	99 horizontal	D	LMS	—
