= Cover Up (TV series) =

1984–1985 American TV series

- Jon-Erik Hexum and Jennifer O'Neill
- Genre: Action; Adventure; Spy
- Created by: Glen A. Larson
- Starring: Jennifer O'Neill; Jon-Erik Hexum; Antony Hamilton; Richard Anderson; Mykelti Williamson
- Theme music composer: Dean Pitchford; Jim Steinman
- Opening theme: "Holding Out for a Hero" performed by Bonnie Tyler
- Composers: Joseph Conlan; J.A.C. Redford; Morton Stevens
- Country of origin: United States
- Original language: English
- No. of seasons: 1
- No. of episodes: 22

Production
- Executive producer: Glen A. Larson
- Producers: Brian Alan Lane; Bob Shayne; Harker Wade
- Production locations: Stage 18, 20th Century Fox Studios - 10201 Pico Blvd., Century City, Los Angeles, California, USA
- Editors: David Howe; Gene Ranney
- Camera setup: Single-camera
- Running time: 48 mins.
- Production companies: 20th Century Fox Television; Glen A. Larson Productions

Original release
- Network: CBS
- Release: September 22, 1984 – April 6, 1985

Cover Up is a television series that aired for one season on CBS from September 22, 1984, to April 6, 1985. Created by Glen A. Larson, it starred Jennifer O'Neill, Jon-Erik Hexum, Antony Hamilton, and Richard Anderson.

The series earned mediocre ratings, but is remembered for the untimely death of Hexum, who was accidentally killed on set on October 12, 1984, when he jokingly put a prop .44 Magnum loaded with blank cartridges to his head and pulled the trigger; the force of the blank fractured his skull, and he was declared brain-dead six days later. That led to Hexum's role being recast, and to stricter industry rules about the handling of prop firearms in recognition of the hazards of blanks.

== Plot ==
Following the death of her husband, fashion photographer Dani Reynolds discovers that he was actually an undercover CIA agent. When she learns he was murdered, she recruits Mac Harper, a former Special Forces soldier, to help her find the killers.

Dani accepts an offer from Henry Towler, her husband's boss, to take his place as an agent. She uses her photography work as a cover, accompanied by Mac as her model, and Henry dispatches the pair all over the world to assist American citizens in trouble or apprehend criminals. Once they reach a destination, they typically have to act on their own judgment and experience with little or no expectation of outside help.

After the death of actor Jon-Erik Hexum, who played Mac, the episode "Writer's Block" introduced Dani's new assistant, Jack Striker. Jack was a CIA agent who, like Mac, operated under the cover of a model.

At the end of "Writer's Block", the following message was displayed instead of the closing credits to explain that Hexum would no longer appear in the series:

"When a star dies, its light continues to shine across the universe for milleniums...John Eric [sic] Hexum died in October of this year... but the lives he touched will continue to be brightened by his light... forever... and ever..."

== Cast ==
- Jennifer O'Neill as Dani Reynolds
- Jon-Erik Hexum as Mac Harper
- Antony Hamilton as Jack Striker
- Richard Anderson as Henry Towler

== Production ==
Jon-Erik Hexum appeared in eight episodes, including the pilot. He was replaced by Antony Hamilton for the remainder of the season. Jennifer O'Neill appeared in all of the episodes. Despite the change in the lead male character, the ratings held steady throughout the winter of 1984–85, though insufficient to avoid cancellation after its first season.

=== On-set accident ===
During a break between scenes on the set on Friday, October 12, 1984, Hexum became bored with filming delays. He began playing Russian roulette with a fully functional .44 Magnum revolver whose cylinder was empty except for one chamber loaded with a blank cartridge. He jokingly spun the cylinder, put the gun to his temple, and pulled the trigger. The firing pin struck the blank, discharging it and generating enough force to fracture his skull. A bone fragment the size of a quarter was driven into Hexum's brain, causing massive hemorrhaging, and he was rushed to the hospital for emergency surgery. He was declared brain dead on October 18 and taken off life support that same day.

== Episodes ==
No.	Title	Directed by	Written by	Original release date	Prod. code
1 2	"Pilot"	Peter Crane	Glen A. Larson	September 22, 1984	3-J01 3-J02
3	"Death in Vogue"	Guy Magar	David H. Balkan	September 29, 1984	3-J03
4	"The Million Dollar Face"	Phil Bondelli	Glen A. Larson	October 6, 1984	3-J04
5	"Harper-Gate"	Arthur Allan Seidelman	Bob Shayne	October 13, 1984	3-J06
6	"Sudden Exposure"	Guy Magar	Lane Del	October 20, 1984	3-J05
7	"Nothing to Lose"	Richard A Colla	Doug Heyes Jr.	October 27, 1984	3-J07
8	"Golden Opportunity"	Sidney Hayers	Bob Shayne	November 3, 1984	3-J08
Hexum's last episode
9	"Writer's Block"	Richard A. Colla	S : Lou Shaw; T : David H. Balkan & Douglas Brooks West; S/T : Andrew Schneider & Sam Egan	November 24, 1984	3-J09
Hamilton's first episode
10	"Murder in Malibu"	Sidney Hayers	S : David Swift; T : Anne Collins;	December 1, 1984	3-J10
11	"Midnight Highway"	Guy Magar	Doug Heyes Jr.	December 8, 1984	3-J11
12	"A Subtle Seduction"	Walter Grauman	Douglas Brooks West	December 29, 1984	3-J12
13	"Black Widow"	Sidney Hayers	Robert Hamilton	January 5, 1985	3-J13
14	"Murder Offshore"	Jeffrey Hayden	Joe Gannon	January 12, 1985	3-J14
15	"The Assassin"	Christopher Hibler	Story by : Donald Ross; Teleplay by : Donald Ross & Doug Heyes, Jr.	January 26, 1985	3-J15
16	"Rules to Die By"	Bernard McEveety	Robert Hamilton	February 2, 1985	3-J16
17	"Healthy, Wealthy and Dead"	Bruce Kessler	Fredrick Rappaport	February 23, 1985	3-J17
18	"The Ugliest American"	Don Weis	Story by : Stephen Kandel; Teleplay by : Milt Rosen	March 2, 1985	3-J18
19	"Who's Trying to Kill Miss Globe?"	Mike Vejar	Story by : Donald Ross; Teleplay by : Joe Gannon	March 9, 1985	3-J19
20	"Adams' Ribs"	John D. Hancock	Robert Hamilton	March 23, 1985	3-J20
21	"Jack of Spades"	Christopher Hibler	Stan Berkowitz	March 30, 1985	3-J21
22	"Passions"	Don Carlos Dunaway	Doug Heyes Jr.	April 6, 1985	3-J22
