= Jon-Erik Hexum =

American actor and model (1957–1984)

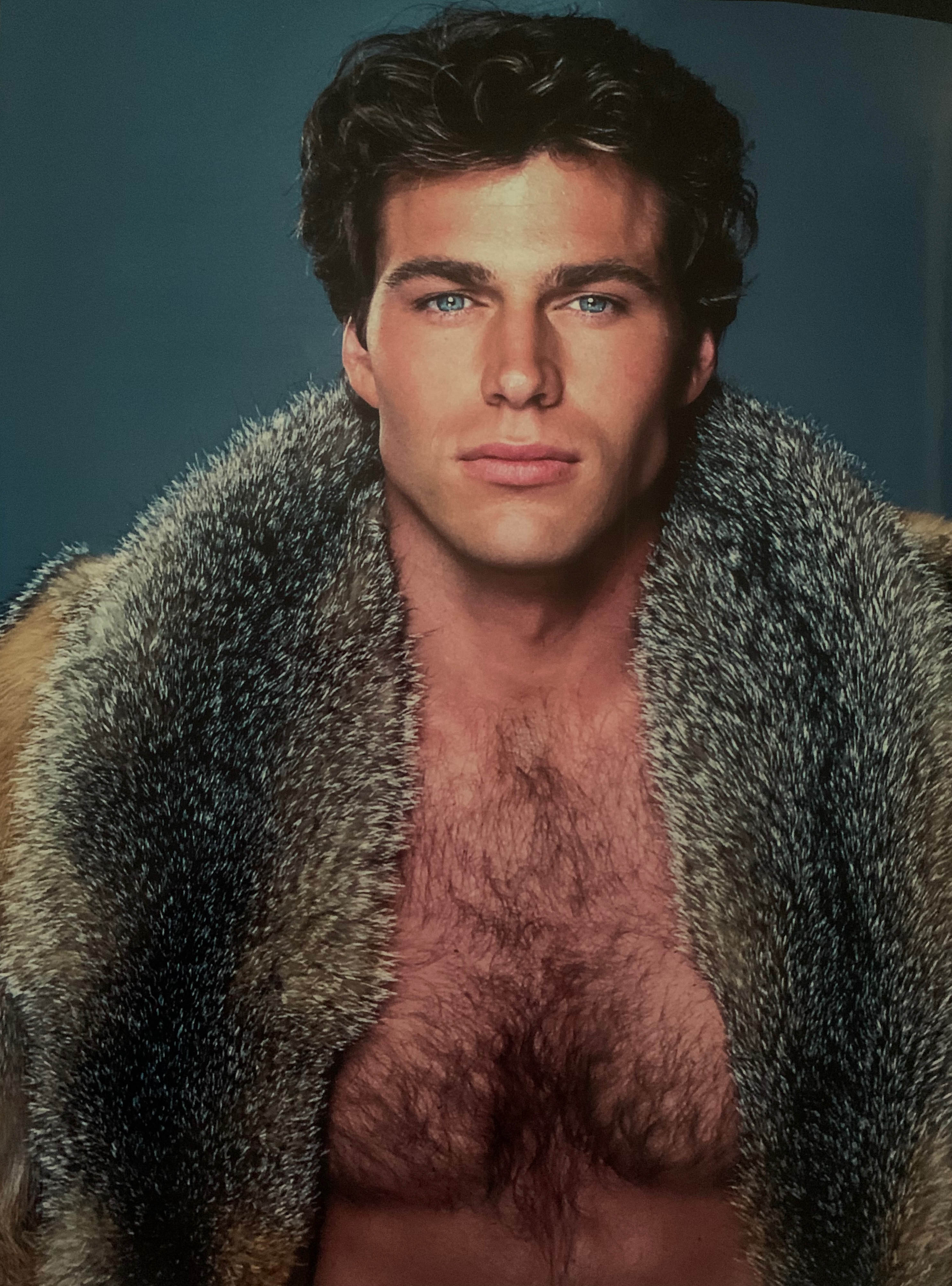
- Hexum in 1983
- Born: November 5, 1957; Englewood, New Jersey, U.S.
- Died: October 18, 1984 (aged 26); Los Angeles, California, U.S.
- Cause of death: Accidental self-inflicted gunshot wound
- Education: Michigan State University (BA, 1980)
- Occupations: Actor; model
- Years active: 1982–1984

Jon-Erik Hexum (/ˈhɛksəm/; November 5, 1957 – October 18, 1984) was an American actor and model, known for his lead roles in the TV series Voyagers! and Cover Up, and his supporting role as Pat Trammell in the biopic The Bear. He died from a self-inflicted blank cartridge gunshot to the head in a game of Russian roulette while on the set of Cover Up.

He was seen as the "next big thing" in Hollywood for his looks, charisma, and ambition. Hexum was a popular sex symbol during his time.

== Early life ==
Jon-Erik Hexum was born on November 5, 1957, in Englewood, New Jersey, to Thorleif Andreas Hexum, a Norwegian immigrant, and Gretha Olivia Paulsen, a Minnesota-born Norwegian-American. He and his elder brother Gunnar were raised in Tenafly by their mother after their parents divorced when Hexum was four. As a single parent after the divorce, Hexum's mother had to work two jobs to support him and his brother. In an interview, Hexum said his mother exposed him to theater arts and music at a young age, "She was wonderful when we were growing up. Somehow she found money to buy us a piano, we got to go to the theater periodically, and I took singing and dancing lessons".

At Tenafly High School, Hexum was an active student, participating in the school's marching band and performing at the 1973 Rose Parade in Pasadena. He also served as drum major of the marching band in his senior year and became the first male cheerleader in his school's history. He also played roles in his school's productions of Carousel and had one of the starring roles in The Pajama Game as a senior. In addition, Hexum was also the senior class president at Tenafly, graduating in 1976.

Hexum went on to Case Western Reserve University in Cleveland to study biomedical engineering and soon transferred to Michigan State University in East Lansing, Michigan. During that time, he worked as a radio disc jockey, played football (mainly as a backup) for the Spartans in 1978, and acted in minor stage roles. Hexum graduated from MSU with a Bachelor of Arts in political philosophy.

== Career ==
A few days after graduation, he moved to New York in 1980 to pursue his acting career. While working as an apartment cleaner, he met John Travolta's manager, Bob LeMond of LeMond/Zetter Management. LeMond saw great potential in Hexum. At LeMond's urging, Hexum relocated to Los Angeles in September 1981 to audition for a movie called Summer Lovers; he lost the part to Peter Gallagher.

In 1982, Hexum won the lead role in the NBC TV series Voyagers! as Phineas Bogg, a former pirate turned time traveler. Voyagers! aired on Sundays and did not fare well in the ratings against 60 Minutes, the highest rated primetime show at the time. As a result, the series was cancelled.

Hexum was then cast opposite Joan Collins in the 1983 made-for-television movie Making of a Male Model, produced by Aaron Spelling. The TV movie was a ratings hit, ranking in the Top 10 for the week it premiered on ABC. Making of a Male Model featured Hexum's character shirtless in various scenes. This, combined with the high ratings, made Hexum a sex symbol. Despite this, Hexum expressed some misgivings about doing the movie afterward, calling it "trashy." Shortly before his death, Hexum said, "it turned out to be a lot more exploitative than I anticipated. I didn't realize how they were going to package the show, how many scenes were going to be shirtless for no apparent reason."

Fresh off Making of a Male Model, Hexum was a guest star in another Spelling production, a 1984 episode of ABC's primetime drama Hotel. In his appearance, Hexum played Prince Erik, a Prince Charming–type character who woos a Cinderella-type character played by Emma Samms.

Later in 1984, Hexum was cast opposite Jennifer O'Neill in the CBS primetime series Cover Up, playing Mac Harper, an undercover CIA operative posing as a model. He was the subject of a profile in the November 1984 issue of Playgirl and appeared clothed and shirtless but not nude in photographs taken for the magazine. The show continued after his death, his character written out of the plot.

That same year Hexum played the terminally ill quarterback Pat Trammell, a small role in the feature film The Bear, a tribute to the University of Alabama football coach Paul "Bear" Bryant, played by Gary Busey. To prepare for the role, Hexum cut his hair short to match Trammell's appearance and before filming visited Alabama and met with Trammell's family and teammates. The Bear would be Hexum's sole feature film performance, released just three weeks before his death. Shortly before his death, Hexum set up a company to produce and direct films.

== Personal life ==
Hexum kept himself fit for roles, as he had been playing football and soccer since he was eight. He also wrestled, swam, and lifted weights, and would work out three times a week at the gym.

A self-described "extreme miser", Hexum owned a modest house in Burbank, California, with sparse furnishings, and drove a 1954 Chevy Bel Air.

Hexum was in a relationship with actress E.G. Daily until his death.

== Death ==
On October 12, 1984, the cast and crew of Cover Up were filming the seventh episode of the series, "Golden Opportunity", on Stage 18 of the 20th Century Fox lot. One of the scenes filmed that day called for Hexum's character to load cartridges into a .44 Magnum revolver, so he was provided with a functional weapon and blanks. When the scene did not play out as the director wanted in the master shot, filming was delayed. Hexum became restless and impatient during the delay and began playing around to lighten the mood. Imitating a game of Russian roulette, he unloaded every chamber except one, spun the cylinder, then raised the gun to his right temple and pulled the trigger.

The explosive effect of the muzzle blast caused enough blunt force trauma to fracture a quarter-sized piece of his skull and propel it into his brain, causing massive hemorrhaging. Hexum was rushed to Beverly Hills Medical Center, where he underwent five hours of surgery to repair his wounds. On October 18, six days after shooting himself, Hexum was declared brain dead at age 26.

With his mother's permission, his body was flown to San Francisco on life support, where his heart was transplanted into a 36-year-old Las Vegas man at California Pacific Medical Center. Hexum's kidneys and corneas were also donated. One cornea went to a 66-year-old man, the other to a young girl. One of the kidney recipients was a critically ill five-year-old boy, and the other was a 43-year-old grandmother of three who had waited eight years for a kidney. Skin that was donated was used to treat a 3 1/2-year-old boy with third-degree burns.

Hexum's body was then flown back to Los Angeles. He was cremated at Grandview Crematory in Glendale, California, and a private funeral was held. His ashes were scattered in the Pacific Ocean, near Malibu, California, by his mother. He left an estate valued at $255,000. The death was ruled accidental. His mother later received an out-of-court settlement from 20th Century Fox Television and Glen A. Larson Productions, the production company behind Cover Up.

The episode on which Hexum had been working was broadcast on November 3, 1984, two weeks after his death. Cover Up continued production without Hexum's character. Three weeks later, in the episode "Writer's Block", aired on November 24, Antony Hamilton was introduced as agent Jack Striker, posing as a new member of the modeling team. Hexum's character Mac is noticeably absent, said to be on another mission. At the end of the episode, Henry Towler (Richard Anderson) breaks the news that Mac has been killed on the other assignment and will not be coming back. In "Writer's Block", the following message ran that replaced the closing credits:

When a star dies, its light continues to shine across the universe for millenniums. John Eric [sic] Hexum died in October of this year ... but the lives he touched will continue to be brightened by his light ... forever ... and ever.

== Filmography ==
Year	Title	Role	Notes
1982–1983	Voyagers!	Phineas Bogg	20 episodes
1983	Voyager from the Unknown	Phineas Bogg	Compilation of episodes 1 and 15 of Voyagers! Released posthumously in 1985.
1983	Making of a Male Model	Tyler Burnett	Television movie
1984	Hotel	Prince Erik	Episode: "Tomorrows"
1984	The Bear	Pat Trammell	Biographical film
1984	Cover Up	Mac Harper	7 episodes

== See also ==
- Brandon Lee
- Rust shooting incident and Halyna Hutchins
- The Captive – 1915 film during which an extra, Charles Chandler, was fatally shot with a rifle
- List of film and television accidents
