= This Man =

Internet hoax

The original "Dream Man" drawing, as published by Andrea Natella in 2008

This Man, often called the Dream Man, is a conceptual art project and hoax created by Italian sociologist and marketer Andrea Natella. In 2008, Natella created a website called "Ever Dream This Man?" describing a supposed mysterious individual who has reportedly appeared in the dreams of numerous people around the world since 2006.

The story gained widespread attention in the late 2000s. In 2010, Natella revealed that the site was a hoax as part of a guerrilla marketing campaign.

== Story ==
According to the story on the "Ever Dream This Man?" website, the first image of This Man was sketched in January 2006 by a "well-known psychiatrist in New York", based on the descriptions of a patient who claims he was a recurring subject in dreams, despite never knowing a man like him in real life. Several days later, another of the psychiatrist's patients recognized the drawing and said he was a figure in his dreams as well. The psychiatrist sent the image to fellow professionals, and collected the testimony of four more people who claimed to recognize the man. Since then, the site claims that more than 8,000 people from cities across the world, like Los Angeles, Berlin, São Paulo, Tehran, Beijing, Rome, Barcelona, Stockholm, Cairo, Paris, Sydney, Den Haag, Pretoria, Buenos Aires, Lagos, Riyadh, New Delhi, Busan, Tokyo, and Moscow claim to have seen the man while sleeping.

Anonymous stories from alleged witnesses vary in his behavior and actions in their dreams, whose content ranges from romantic or sexual fantasies, attacking and committing crime against the dreamer, to giving cryptic life advice. His relationship with the dreamer varied between accounts; in one, he was the dreamer's father, while in another, he was a schoolteacher from Brazil with six fingers on his right hand. His voice was also unidentifiable due to the fact that he rarely spoke, as well as the difficulty in remembering sounds in dreams versus images. There were some recurring themes in his messages, such as telling dreamers to: "go North".

In a 2015 interview with Vice, site creator Andrea Natella claimed that he first dreamt of This Man in the winter of 2008, wherein the man: "invited [Natella] to create a website to find an answer to his own appearance". Following This Man's instructions, Natella created the website ThisMan.org, including an identikit image of This Man created using the mobile app Ultimate Flash Face.

An actual living human that looked like This Man was never identified. Natella has received thousands of letters and emails from people about who they think This Man resembles, ranging from fictional characters like The Man from Another Place from Twin Peaks and the dummy from The Twilight Zone, to real public figures such as Abdel Fattah el-Sisi, Andrew Lloyd Webber, and Stephen Hawking. Several people claimed they themselves were This Man, including an Indian guru named Arud Kannan Ayya, who cited it as proof of his miraculous powers. Several followers of Muhammad Qasim bin Abdul Karim—a Pakistani public figure who has claimed to have dreams from God, as well as of the Islamic prophet Muhammad, future events like World War III, and Judgement Day—have claimed that Qasim is This Man. Many people each year have reported seeing this man in their dream, and some even say they know who he is.

ThisMan.org posited five theories about This Man's origins:

- The Archetype Theory: This Man is an example of Carl Jung's concept of the unconscious "archetypal image" people see during very difficult life situations.
- The Religious Theory: This Man is a manifestation of God.
- The Dream Surfer Theory: An outside force implants This Man in people's dreams, whether from someone's supernatural projection, or mental conditioning by a corporation.
- The Dream Imitation Theory: People only dream of This Man after having already learned about the phenomenon and the image has left an impression on their minds.
- The Daytime Recognition Theory: People poorly remember faces from their dreams, and they only assume it represents This Man after seeing the image.

== Spread ==
The story of This Man started gaining attention from internet users and the press in 2008-2009. It was not until October 2009 that views of the site skyrocketed. In a short period of time, it garnered more than two million visits and 10,000-plus emails from people sharing experiences with This Man and sending photos of those who looked like him. On October 12, 2009, comedian Tim Heidecker made a Twitter post about This Man, tweeting that it was "scaring the shit outta me." While Natella's previous marketing stunts only garnered local attention, This Man was the first time his work got international recognition.

The most common version of the meme was in the form of a flyer featuring the identikit image and the following text:

EVER DREAM THIS MAN?
Every night, all over the world, hundreds of people see this face in their dreams. If this man appears in your dreams too, or you have any information that can help us identify him, please contact us.
www.thisman.org

== Exposure ==
After This Man's initial burst in popularity, users on forums such as 4chan, as well as blogs like ASSME and io9, became suspicious that it was a guerrilla marketing stunt. A WHOIS lookup of ThisMan.org revealed that its hosting company owned another domain named guerrigliamarketing.it, "a fake advertising agency" founded by Natella that "designed subversive hoaxes and created weird art projects exploring pornography, politics, and advertising". At the time, in late 2009, some sources still presented the debate between those claiming it was a hoax and those claiming it was a real phenomenon as unresolved and ongoing.

In 2010, Natella made a post on the website of KOOK Artgency, an art agency company he founded, where he confirmed that he invented the story of This Man as a publicity stunt. Natella admitted that he had fabricated the whole story and that he had based the original sketch of This Man on a photo of his father when he was young. Natella said that he was inspired by the concept of dream invasion, which he had encountered in some movies and books, and that he wanted to explore the power of the internet to create and spread urban legends and collective myths. He elaborated on the topic further in a 2012 paper titled "Viral 'K' Marketing". Although Natella never confirmed whether the project had a commercial purpose, sources such as The Kernel said it was "almost certain" that the site was created as a guerrilla marketing campaign for a planned film project by Bryan Bertino and Ghost House Pictures.

Even after Natella's confirmation of the hoax, serious coverage of This Man continued into the mid-2010s. In 2015, Vice Media contacted the site for an interview, and Natella answered questions as if the site was legitimate. Several hours after Vice published its interview with Natella, it published a retraction clarifying that This Man was not real and admitting they had initially fallen for the hoax, saying:

"We run a story, it turns out to be something that was denounced in 2009 and could be easily verified as fake with a single google, a few people call us dickheads and the editorial team drown in their own tears. Sometimes we mess up."

== Analysis ==
io9 writer Annalee Newitz called This Man "Natella's greatest masterwork", reasoning that it was only "uncanny", "cheesy and a little bit scary", and "doesn't smack of artsy pseudo-intellectual 'politics' like a lot of his other art does." Vice expressed that while This Man does not exist, he "properly looks like the kind of dude you might see in a dream", where "he pats you on the back and you feel warm and nostalgic. You wake up with an erection you can't explain". A 2014 article from the fringe science website Mysterious Universe claims that people experiencing the same type of dreams is possible; it cites not only Jung's archetypal theory but also Ervin László's pseudoscientific theory of the Akashic Field, saying:

"Should it prove true that our thoughts do not reside within our own heads, but rather exist in the ether, then couldn't some of us be accessing the same information in our subconscious during dreams?"

Vice described the purpose of the hoax as "priming people to dream what they've never dreamed before", similar to "Inception but with memes".

== In other media ==
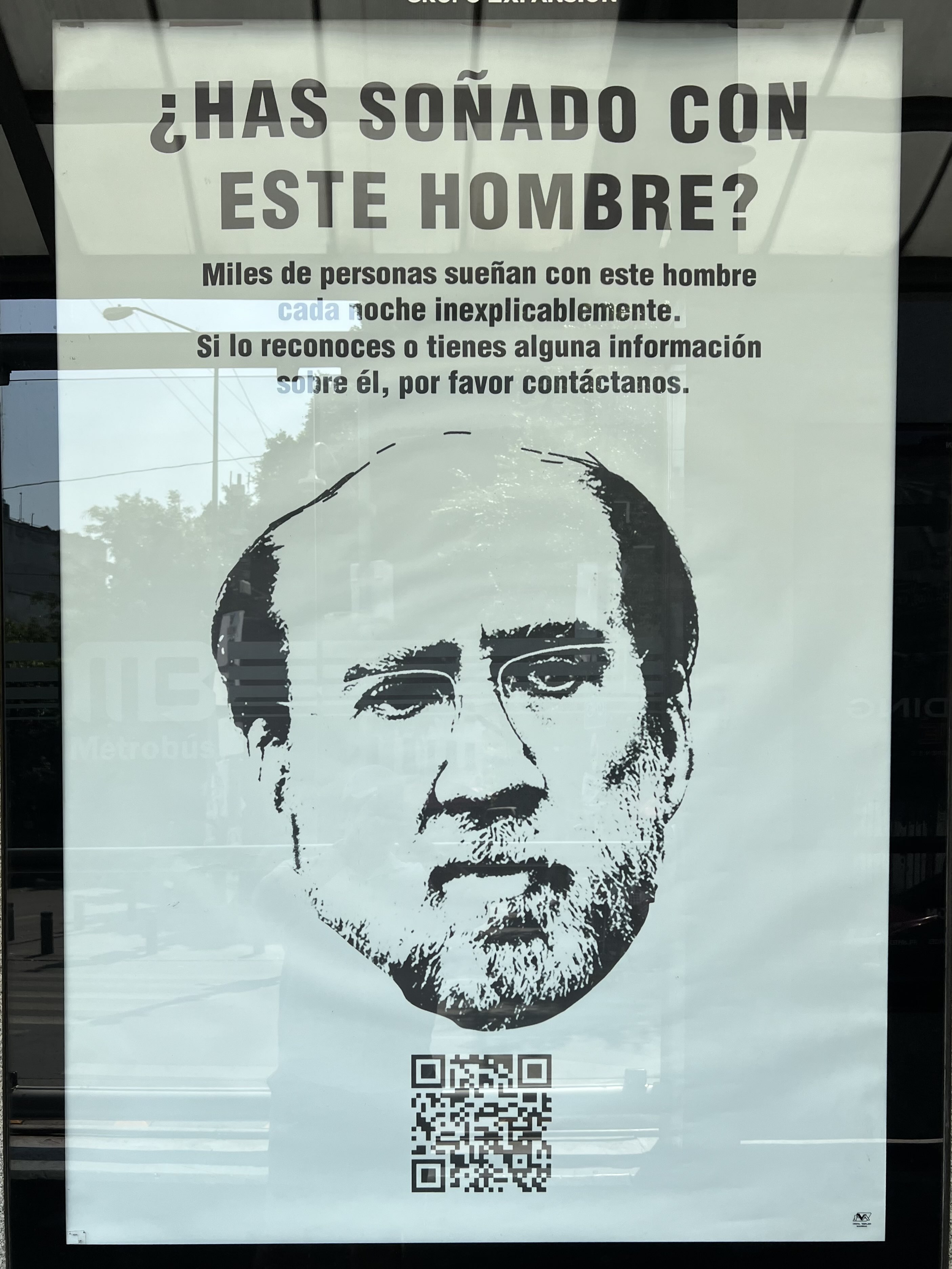
A Spanish-language advertisement for the film Dream Scenario (2023) that references This Man, with the image changed to Nicolas Cage's face

Upon This Man's initial surge in popularity, internet users posted several internet memes spoofing the site's "Ever Dream This Man?" flyer, replacing This Man's face with headshots of characters and public figures like Robbie Rotten, Karl Marx, and Barack Obama. Comedy Central also produced their own parody of the flyer that used Daniel Tosh's face.

=== Film adaptations ===
In May 2010, it was announced that filmmaker Bryan Bertino used the story as a basis for a screenplay, also titled This Man, to be produced by Sam Raimi's Ghost House Pictures. A press release from Ghost House said the film would be about:

"An ordinary guy who discovers that people he has never met are seeing him in their dreams. Now he must find out why he is the source of nightmares for strangers all over the world."

The press release also claimed that Ghost House bought the website ThisMan.org from Natella; however, the domain still had not changed hands from its original host in 2013. There was no further news from Ghost House about the film, and their option on the movie rights expired. The story was subsequently proposed to various Italian producers, who did not pick up on the project.

Heste Hombre (originally titled THISMAN) is a 2020 Spanish-Italian film directed by Luca Pedretti and Cinzia Bomoll, with a screenplay by Bomoll and Daniele Cosci; it follows the story of a documentarian seeking to discover why thousands of people are dreaming of the same stranger. It won the Solinas Award Italy-Spain for Best Screenplay, awarded at the 13th Festival de Cine Italiano de Madrid in December 2020.

In January 2024, Japanese filmmaker Yujiro Amano released a teaser trailer for a film adaptation, titled THIS MAN, that is unrelated to the Ghost House project. Billed as the first Japanese film based on a foreign urban legend, it was filmed in 2023 and released in late July 2024. It received largely negative reviews; on the review aggregator site Rotten Tomatoes, 5 of 6 critics' reviews are negative.

=== Film and television references ===
- This Man's identikit image makes brief appearances in the beginning of the 2017 South Korean film Lucid Dream.
- The 2017 Spring Special episode of the long-running Japanese horror anthology series Tales of the Unusual features a segment based on the urban legend titled "Dream Man".
- In The X-Files episode "Plus One", This Man can be seen in the upper right part of a photo of The Lone Gunmen that previously did not include him.
- The design of the title ventriloquist dummy in the episode "Freddy" from the TV anthology series Stories to Stay Awake is inspired by This Man.
- The plot of the 2023 film Dream Scenario has been compared to This Man, with reviewers speculating that it inspired the film's plot, and the meme is referenced in both the film's dialogue and in advertisements preceding its release. Despite broad similarities in their plots, the production was unrelated to the This Man film project by Bryan Bertino and Ghost House.

=== Literature and comics ===
- In 2016, the internet meme inspired volume 355 of the Italian comic book series Dylan Dog, titled L'uomo dei tuoi sogni ("The man of your dreams").
- In 2018, Weekly Shōnen Magazine began running a manga based on This Man and named after the hoax. Illustrated by Kouji Megumi (illustrator of Bloody Monday) and written by Karin Sora, it follows a police officer named Hakaru Amano and his case that involves the urban legend of This Man. The first volume ran from April 25, 2018, to April 3, 2019.
- A story arc in the 2021 manga series Dandadan, published on Shōnen Jump+, features defective alien clones modelled after This Man, something acknowledged by the official "Ever Dream This Man?" website.
- A Chinese horror manhua series "Evil Museum", created by BING and published by KuaiKan Comics, features This Man in chapters 39–43.
- Chapter 3 in the 2024 manga series "The Urban Legend Files", (都市伝説先輩; Toshi Densetsu Senpai) published on Shōnen Jump+ features a character trying to have a dream about This Man.
- In 2026, issue #269 of the webcomic Bite-Sized Archie, published by Archie Comics, referenced This Man in a strip titled "That Man".

=== Online videos ===
- In 2021, "The Yard" podcast spearheaded by YouTuber and livestreamer Ludwig Ahgren launched a limited-time merchandise and social media campaign referencing This Man; with the eponymous Man replaced by Aiden McCaig, a co-host of the podcast.
- In 2023, Touhou doujin circle "Akatsuki Records" released a song titled "グッナイメア". The animated music video features people with the face of This Man.
- On June 17, 2024, Jeonghan X Wonwoo, subunit of the K-pop group SEVENTEEN, released their debut single album 'This Man' and its title track 'Last Night', whose music video presented a cinematic narrative based on this meme.
- On November 19, 2025, the K-pop group Babymonster released a music video for their song "Psycho", featuring a poster of the six members under the text "Ever Dream This Girl?", a reference to the meme.
- In 2025, Brazilian rapper and singer Matuê referenced the This Man meme in the visual identity, cover art, and promotional material for his album "XTRANHO".

=== Video games ===
- Two pixel art images of This Man appear as Easter eggs in the video game AI: The Somnium Files. The player receives an achievement if they find both images.
- The “Man in Dreams Flyer” found in the Finnish indie game Fear & Hunger 2: Termina is a direct reference to This Man, with the face of one of the game’s villains, Per’kele, in place of the original.
