= Making of a Male Model =

1983 television movie

- Genre: Drama; Romance
- Written by: AJ Carothers
- Directed by: Irving J. Moore
- Starring: Joan Collins; Jon-Erik Hexum; Arte Johnson; Kevin McCarthy; Roxie Roker; Ted McGinley; Jeff Conaway
- Theme music composer: Artie Butler
- Country of origin: United States
- Original language: English

Production
- Executive producers: Douglas S. Cramer; Aaron Spelling
- Producers: Lynn Loring; Elaine Rich
- Production locations: L'Orangerie - 903 North La Cienega Boulevard, Los Angeles, California; Plaza Hotel - 750 Fifth Avenue, Manhattan, New York City, New York; The Lot - 1041 N. Formosa Avenue, West Hollywood, California, USA
- Cinematography: Richard L. Rawlings
- Editor: Dick Darling
- Running time: 100 min.
- Production company: Aaron Spelling Productions

Original release
- Network: ABC
- Release: October 9, 1983

Making of a Male Model is a 1983 American made-for-television romantic drama film directed by Irving J. Moore and starring Joan Collins and Jon-Erik Hexum.

It was produced by ABC and released on October 9, 1983.

== Plot ==
Kay Dillon, a successful modeling agent, meets the young and handsome ranch hand, Tyler Burnett in Nevada, while attending an outdoor shoot. She notices his good looks and invites him to move to New York and start working as a model. Burnett, who has just been dumped by his girlfriend, accepts the invitation and goes to New York, where he shares an apartment with another model, Chuck Lanyard. Lanyard is addicted to alcohol and drugs; he is 35 years old, and therefore too old to be successful in the business. Burnett, who does not understand Lanyard's problems at first, is now being turned into one of America's best looking models by his agent and soon wins his first professional assignment.

However, Burnett wants a woman to settle down with in Nevada; he does not really like the fast-paced life in New York. After helping out Dillon during a fight with another agent, she falls in love with him and he believes she is the woman he could finally settle down with despite the age difference.

Burnett soon becomes America's most successful male model and Dillon realizes that it's impossible to continue a relationship with him, being his agent. After she confronts him with the sad truth, Burnett loses himself in a world of drugs and meaningless affairs. Things change when his former roommate dies of an overdose. Burnett flees back to Nevada where Dillon is able to convince him to return for one last shooting. Afterwards she lets him go and he returns to Nevada.

== Cast ==
- Joan Collins as Kay Dillon
- Jon-Erik Hexum as Tyler Burnett
- Kevin McCarthy as Ward Hawley
- Roxie Roker as Madge Davis
- Arte Johnson as Marty Sampson
- Ted McGinley as Gary Angelo
- Jeff Conaway as Chuck Lanyard
- Rosemarie Stack as Mrs. Rockwell
- Andrea Howard as Marsha
- Tamara Stafford as Linda
- Robert Walker Jr. as Joseph
- Twyla Littleton as Amanda
