= For the Love of Sci-Fi =

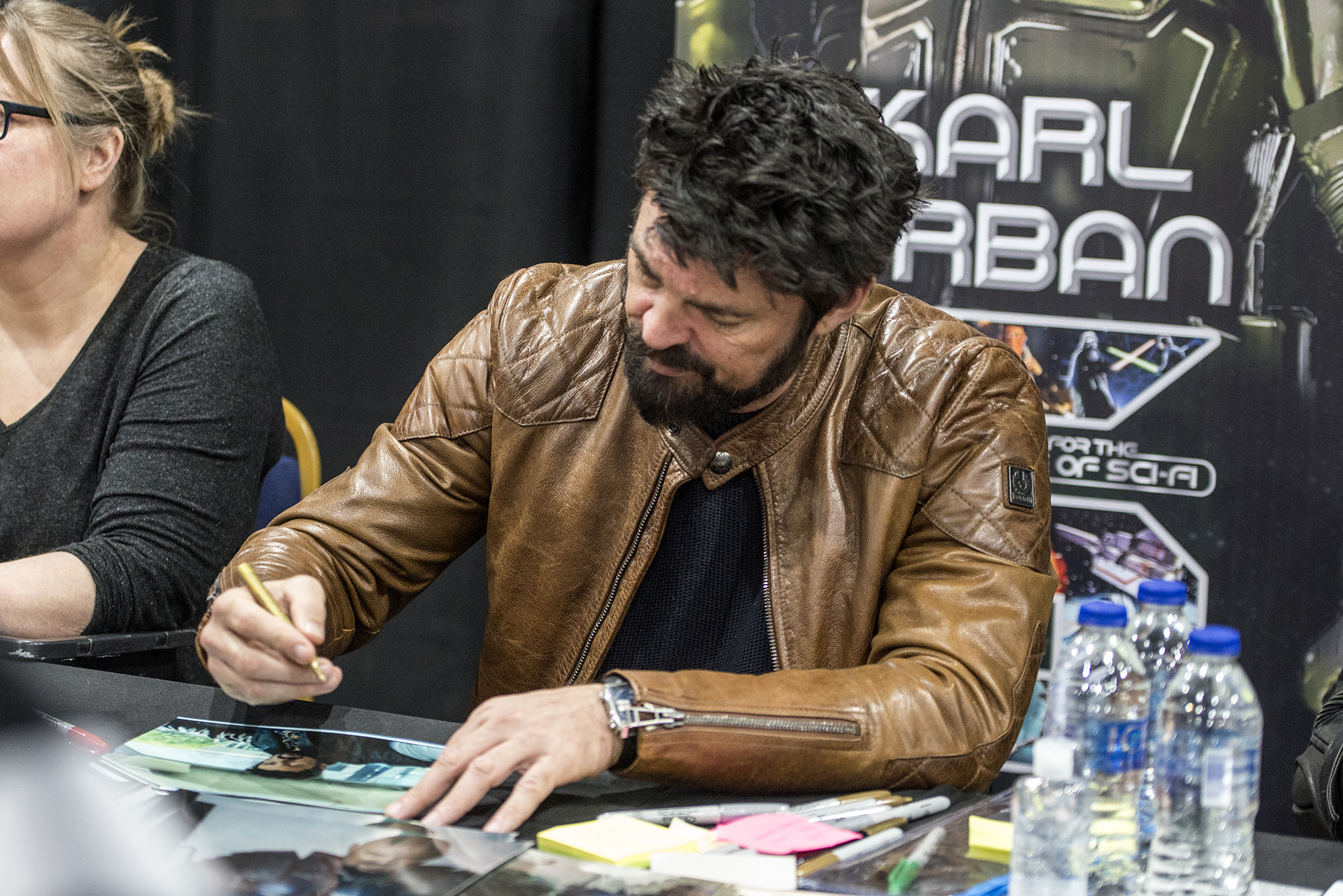
- Dredd star Karl Urban Signs Photographs At For The Love Of Sci-Fi 2019
- Status: Active
- Genre: Science fiction, popular culture
- Venue: Bowlers Exhibition Centre
- Locations: Trafford Park, Greater Manchester, England
- Inaugurated: 2015
- Most recent: 2-3 December 2023
- Next event: Undetermined
- Attendance: 19,000k+ (2023 event)
- Organizer: Monopoly Events
- Website: www.fortheloveofsci-fi.com

For the Love of Sci-Fi was a fan convention held annually in Manchester, England that celebrated the science fiction genre in various formats such as films, sci-fi fiction, comics, video games, and sci-fi cosplay which was organised by UK Events company Monopoly Events.

== History and organisation ==
For the Love of Sci-Fi ran from 2015 and was originally titled "For the Love of the Force" when Monopoly Events CEO Andy Kleek saw a gap in the market for a science-fiction themed fan convention, the very first event had a strong focus on the Star Wars franchise, however, for the second event, Kleek wanted to expand into other areas of the genre and changed the event name to For the Love of Sci-Fi. He liked the idea of a comic convention style event that focussed purely on science-fiction rather than comic books and general pop culture.

Monopoly Events is a Manchester-based event organization company that specializes in events held in the North West of England and Scotland. Along with the For the Love of Sci-Fi event, they are also responsible for organising Comic Con Liverpool, Comic Con Scotland, Comic Con Wales, For the Love of Wrestling, For the Love of Horror, For the Love of Wrestling, Comic Con Manchester, For the Love of MMA, Comic Con Northern Ireland and Comic Con Scotland Aberdeen with new events, Comic Con Northeast, Comic Con Midlands and Comic Con Yorkshire joining the fold in 2023 and plans for further expansion across the UK including into London in 2024.

The first For the Love of Sci-Fi (For the Love of the Force) event ran over three consecutive days in December 2015 and was extremely well received by the public for a first-time event, with approximately 21,000 visitors across the three-day event.

The convention consistently includes celebrity guest appearances from various science fiction films, television shows, video games etc. including classic franchises such as Star Wars, Star Trek, Battlestar Galactica, The Punisher, Dredd, Stranger Things, RoboCop, Doctor Who and many others.

Monopoly Events stated publicly in November 2023 that after their 2023 event they would be putting the For the Love of Sci-Fi event on hold indefinitely in order to "help cope with our major expansion and gruelling schedule of shows".

== Notable events ==
The 2018 event was introduced for the first time with an opening night concert, appearing on stage along with numerous bands was Stranger Things star Gaten Matarazzo played alongside his band Work In Progress, while Ray Parker Jr. sang the Ghostbusters Theme alongside sci-fi band Blues Harvest.

The 2020 event, due to run from 5-6 December 2020 saw a huge soar in ticket sales when the events social media platforms announced the appearance of Netflix hit show Stranger Things star Millie Bobby Brown, within hours, tickets to get the actresses autograph had completely sold out. The event was eventually cancelled due to the 2020 COVID-19 pandemic.

== Venue ==
For the Love of Sci-Fi was held exclusively at Bowlers Exhibition Centre, situated in Trafford Park, Stretford, Greater Manchester. The venue is also the site of many raves and music events including Sidewinder and Manchester Adored, conventions such as For the Love of Horror and Comic Con Manchester, various food and drink expositions and regular boxing and mixed martial arts (MMA) events, dart's championships and tours and other sporting events. It is also home to a gym with a boxing ring, a Caribbean themed cafe-bar and a fan-built replica of the Mos Eisley Cantina from the Star Wars universe which doubles as a functioning bar and an escape room.

The event runs across the entirety of the arena, including the Cantina Space Bar, which is often used for after-parties as well as being open to visitors for the duration of the event. The main exhibition hall, Trafford Arena 1 is home to various film sets (something for which the Monopoly Events is famous for, making their event experiences very different from others like them within the UK), a stage for celebrity guest question and answer panels and also live music performances, celebrity guest professional photoshoots and autograph sessions, cosplay events, and other displays. As of 2019, the smaller Trafford Arena 2 features a large dealers zone selling sci-fi related memorabilia, artwork, and collectibles, prior to this the dealer's area could be found in the smaller Bridgewater Arena and before that in a marquee at the entrance to the arena, (before this the Trafford Arena 2 was used for Q&A panels and a live orchestra at the 2018 event) for the 2019 event, the decision was made to move the dealer's area to allow for more room for visitors in the zone and a more extensive range of vendors. As of the 2019 event, the Bridgewater Arena is home to a gaming area and attractions aimed at smaller children and families such as a Grinch Grotto, arts and craft displays, inflatables and funfair games. A smaller suite called the Trafford Suite is home to a Jedi lightsaber training area while a small funfair can be found at the front of the venue as well as a food court area.

== Show features ==
=== Celebrity guests ===
As with many other fan convention events, celebrity guests from past and present popular media are regularly invited to For the Love of Sci-Fi and are an extremely popular part of the event, posing for professional photographs with fans and providing autographs as well as giving fans the chance to meet them and chat in person. Monopoly Events is well known for bringing first-time guests to the UK, as well as guests that are from older cult film and television shows of past decades such as the 1980s and 1990s. Sometimes the celebrities involved will use their appearances to raise awareness and funds for a charity or cause important to them, while others use the opportunity to promote upcoming projects such as new films or television shows.

=== Celebrity panels ===
Most, if not all, of the celebrity guests at For the Love of Sci-Fi appear on stage at some point throughout the course of the event, answering both host and fan questions alike. At the 2015, 2016, 2017 and 2018 events, the panels took place in the Trafford Arena 2 with seating throughout the hall and a large stage at the front. As of the 2019 event, the stage is built in the main hall where anyone on the floor is free to attend the talks and a large LED screen at the back of the stage is used to give visitors information and show previews of upcoming movies as well as signage for the panels.

=== Celebrity meet & greet experiences ===
Some of the celebrity guests agree to a 30-minute meet & greet experience, this experience is at an additional cost to the entry ticket, is much more intimate than meeting a guest at a signing table or photograph area, and takes place in a room away from the main event. During the experience the celebrity or celebrities will chat and mingle with up to 30 fans at a time, away from the louder main event crowds, sharing conversation and taking selfie photographs as souvenirs.

=== Photographs ===
For the Love of Sci-Fi includes a professional photoshoot area where fans can have their photo taken with their favourite guest or guests before collecting them at the exit of the area. Sometimes the photographs are taken in front of a screen and at other times a set or prop is used, such as the screen used lawmaster bike with Karl Urban at the 2019 event.

=== Autographs ===
The event also includes an autograph area where celebrity guests from film and TV sign items for the public and spend a few minutes chatting with their fans.

=== Cosplay ===
A large part of the event is devoted to the cosplay hobby where members of the public are allowed, and encouraged, to take part in dressing up as characters from popular sci-fi movies and television shows. Cosplaying has become one of the most popular parts of many fan conventions around the world and can be used as a platform to showcase the costumer's latest handywork, to show devotion to their favourite characters or engage in role-play with other cosplayers in the same series, as well as to meet new people with mutual interests as themselves. The For the Love of Sci-Fi event, like all of the Monopoly Events shows, hosts a cosplay competition every year with both adult and child participation encouraged and prizes given for the best costumes.

=== Prop and set exhibits ===
Monopoly Events is famous for providing a vast array of props and set builds for its visitors to enjoy, with For the Love of Sci-Fi being no exception, visitors can find exhibits such as a full-sized X-wing fighter from Star Wars, the Tardis from Doctor Who, the DeLorean Time Machine from Back to the Future, a forest scene complete with spaceship from E.T., Hammerstein from ABC Warriors, ED-209 from RoboCop, a full-sized animatronic Jabba the Hutt, a full-sized Peterbilt Truck from Transformers and much more. The first event in 2015 featured a one-of-a-kind full-sized Scoutwalker from Star Wars which was the only one of its kind in the UK.

=== Retro gaming area ===
For the Love of Sci-Fi has a large area dedicated to retro gaming consoles for visitors to play.

=== Trader zone ===
Within the main exhibition hall, there is a large trader zone that contains many traders selling film and television, comic and science fiction related memorabilia, comics, games, artwork, toys and collectibles.

== Location, dates and notable guests ==
Dates	Location	Notable guests
4–6 December 2015	Bowlers Exhibition Centre, Manchester	Dave Prowse, Garrick Hagon, Toby Philpott, Michael Carter, Simon Williamson, Femi Taylor, Alan Ruscoe, Pam Rose, John Simpkin, Michael Henbury, Barrie Holland, Anthony Forrest, Chris Bunn, Laurie Goode, Nick Joseph, Chris Muncke, Peter Roy, Alan Flyng, Paul Markham, Ted Western, Stephanie English, Brian Muir, Shaun Harrison
3-4 December 2016	Bowlers Exhibition Centre, Manchester	Dirk Benedict, Herbert Jefferson Jr., Michael Biehn, Mark Ryan, Sylvester McCoy, Patricia Quinn, Miriam Margolyes, Jon Campling, Norman Lovett, John Wagner, Jennifer Blanc-Biehn, Kevin Hudson, Shane Rimmer, Matt Zimmerman, Jeremy Wilkin
2-3 December 2017	Bowlers Exhibition Centre, Manchester	William Shatner, Dolph Lundgren, David Hasselhoff, Ernie Hudson, Jennifer Runyon, Zach Galligan, Billy Dee Williams, Ian McDiarmid, Denis Lawson, Jeremy Bulloch, Daniel Logan, Joonas Suotamo, Brian Muir, Casper Van Dien, Jennifer Wenger, Danny John-Jules
1-2 December 2018	Bowlers Exhibition Centre, Manchester	Carl Weathers, Jesse Ventura, Gaten Matarazzo, Caleb McLaughlin, Brigitte Nielsen, Henry Thomas, Dee Wallace, Robert MacNaughton, Lou Ferrigno, Ray Parker Jr., Spencer Wilding, Nick Maley & Yoda, Mike Quinn, Paul Blake, Bern Collaco
7-8 December 2019	Bowlers Exhibition Centre, Manchester	Jon Bernthal, Karl Urban, Peter Weller, Dolph Lundgren, Charlie Heaton, Danny Glover, Sam J. Jones, Brian Blessed, Warwick Davis, Ray Park, Spencer Wilding, Al Leong, Annabelle Davis, Mark Dodson
3-4 December 2022	Bowlers Exhibition Centre. Manchester	Mads Mikkelsen, Anthony Daniels, Dolph Lundgren, Jean-Claude Van Damme, David Hayter, Hugh Quarshie, Omid Abtahi, Guy Henry, Will Poulter, Dacre Montgomery, Cara Buono, Mason Dye, James Tolkan, Donald Fullilove, Adrianne Palicki, Randy Havens, Harry Waters Jr., Claudia Wells, Richard Oldfield, Julian Glover
2-3 December 2023	Bowlers Exhibition Centre, Manchester	Andrey Ivchenko, Anthony Mackie, Antony Starr, Billie Piper, Cameron Monaghan, Chace Crawford, Christopher Eccleston, Clark Gregg, Daphne Zuniga, Elodie Grace Orkin, Jack Dylan Grazer, Laz Alonso, Martin Quinn, Nick Frost, Nikola Djuricko, Rhona Mitra, Shawn Ashmore, Simon Kassianides, Tait Fletcher

== See also ==
- Science fiction convention
- Comic convention
- Fan convention
- List of multigenre conventions
