= Comic Con Scotland =

Fan convention in Edinburgh, Scotland

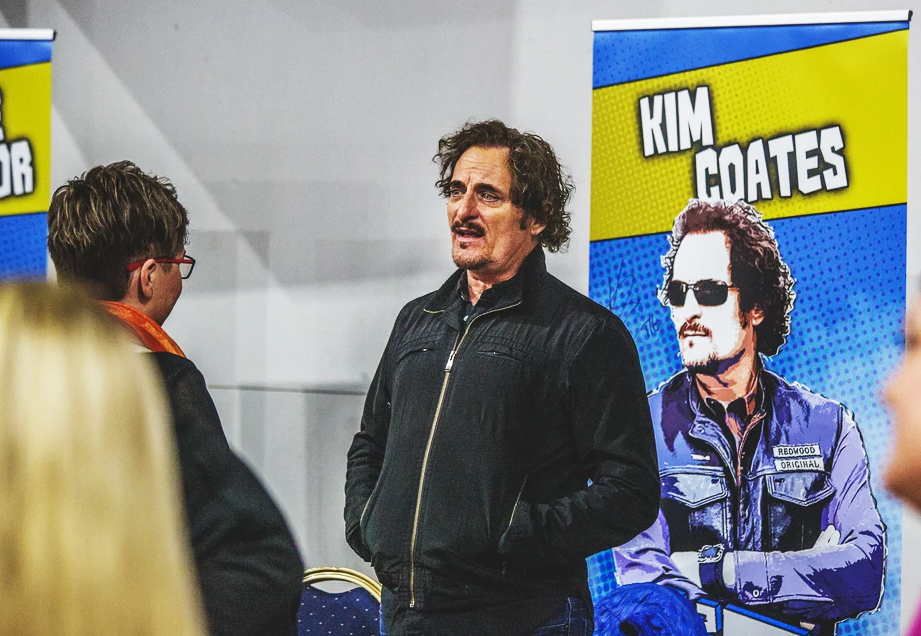
- Sons of Anarchy star Kim Coates chats to a fan at Comic Con Scotland in October 2019.
- Status: Active
- Genre: Multigenre, covering popular culture elements including sci-fi, horror, fantasy, mainstream, wrestling and more
- Venue: Royal Highland Centre
- Locations: Ingliston, Edinburgh, Scotland
- Inaugurated: 10–11 November 2018
- Most recent: 24–25 October 2026
- Next event: 9–10 October 2027
- Attendance: 35,000+ (2023 event)
- Organizer: Monopoly Events
- Website: www.comicconventionscotland.co.uk

Comic Con Scotland is a fan convention held annually in Edinburgh, Scotland, that celebrates films, cult television, video gaming, anime, cosplay and comic books which is organised by UK Events company Monopoly Events.

== History and organisation ==
Comic Con Scotland began its annual run of events in 2018 after Scottish fans of other events organized by Monopoly Events approached the company's CEO Andy Kleek and requested a similar event to the already successful Comic Con Liverpool but in the East of Scotland. Kleek saw a gap in the market and moved to fill it immediately with a brand new annual event for the people of Edinburgh and its surrounding areas. Like many other events globally during the COVID-19 pandemic, the event suffered cancellation and rescheduling twice before lockdowns in the United Kingdom and specifically Scotland were lifted and the event was able to continue its run with the October 2022 event.

Monopoly Events is a Manchester-based event organization company that specializes in events held in the North West of England and Scotland. Along with the Scottish event, they are also responsible for organising Comic Con Liverpool, Comic Con Scotland Aberdeen, Comic Con Wales, Comic Con Manchester, Comic Con Northern Ireland, Comic Con North East, Comic Con Midlands Telford, Comic Con Midlands Birmingham, Comic Con London, Comic Con Ireland, For the Love of Wrestling, For the Love of Horror, For the Love of MMA, For the Love of Cosplay, For the Love of Darts, For the Love of Vampire Diaries, For the Love of Anime, For the Love of Time & Space, For the Love of Supernatural, For the Love of Retro, For the Love of The Force, For the Love of Time and Space, Comic Con Czech Republic, Comic Con Poland and formerly Comic Con Yorkshire, For the Love of Sci-Fi and For the Love of Fantasy. There are also plans for further expansion across the UK including organizing Comic Con South West, Comic Con South East and Comic Con East Anglia in the future.

The first Scottish event ran over two consecutive days and had an 80's and 90's theme subtitled For the Love of 80's and For the Love of 90's and it featured prop builds and guests from shows and films of these eras.

The convention consistently includes celebrity guest appearances from various film, television, video gaming, anime and comic book series including Doctor Who, Star Trek, Star Wars, Battlestar Galactica, Grease, Sons of Anarchy, Back to the Future, Supernatural, The Lost Boys, Cobra Kai, Red Dwarf, Teenage Mutant Ninja Turtles and others.

The first event in Edinburgh in November 2018 was held in the Edinburgh International Conference Centre or EICC for short in the city centre. The event was spread out across the entirety of the large city centre venue with the traders' hall being held in the large Cromdale Hall area, the celebrity guest area and prop builds in the larger Lennox Suite, celebrity panel talks in the Sidlaw Auditorium and the cosplay competition and masquerade held in the Lammermuir Suite. However, due to the first year attendance being so high and plans for future events which would exceed the capacity of the EICC, the decision was made by Monopoly Events to move Comic Con Scotland to the much larger Royal Highland Centre, an exhibition centre and showground located at Ingliston in the western outskirts of Edinburgh, adjacent to Edinburgh Airport and the A8, allowing for a wider demographic of visitors from around the globe, higher numbers of attendance and ergo, a much higher calibre of celebrity guest, larger prop builds, additional set builds, and a larger trader area.

The convention first ran across one vast exhibition hall called The Highland Hall as one large space. However the 2022 event saw the inclusion of The Lowland Hall, which was joined to the Highland Hall via a covered concourse. This allowed for more props and guests to be accommodated.

The exhibition hall features a large dealers zone selling movie, comic and science fiction related memorabilia, artwork, and collectibles as well as various film props and sets (something for which the Monopoly Events is famous for, making their event experiences very different from others like them within the UK), vehicles from different franchises, a stage for celebrity guest question and answer panels, celebrity guest professional photoshoots and autograph sessions, cosplay events, and other displays as well as a food court area.

In 2018 during the very first Comic Con Scotland hosted by Monopoly Events in November 2018, Incredible Hulk actor Lou Ferrigno celebrated his 67th birthday alongside fellow actors Sam J. Jones, Gil Gerard, Zach Galligan, Sylvester McCoy, Herbert Jefferson Jr., and Ray Parker Jr. where the stars presented Ferrigno with a Hulk themed birthday cake.

== Venue ==
As of 2019 Comic Con Scotland is held exclusively at Royal Highland Centre, originally the Royal Highland Showground, is an exhibition centre and showground located at Ingliston in the western outskirts of Edinburgh. The centre welcomes over 1 million visitors annually to a wide range of events. The largest event is the Royal Highland Show, which attracts over 200,000 visitors each year.

== Effect of 2020 COVID-19 pandemic ==
The 2020 Comic Con Scotland event was canceled in May 2020 due to the ongoing COVID-19 pandemic. Andy Kleek of Monopoly Events stated that "The positive news is that virtually all the headline guests that were going to appear this year have said they will do next year, which is a huge bonus and a positive all round." Guests confirmed for the event to date included Alicia Silverstone, Michael Madsen, Steve Guttenberg, Joey Cramer, Frank Welker, and Peter Cullen. The event was again cancelled due to Scottish lockdown rules in 2021 and went ahead 8–9 October 2022.

== 2023 SAG-AFTRA Strike ==
The SAG-AFTRA Strike of 2023, affected many fan conventions worldwide. During the strike, SAG guidelines for appearances at fan conventions had to be followed by both guests and the convention organisers. Whilst appearing at any event, guests were unable to discuss any past, present or future work projects as they would normally do when meeting fans, they were also unable to answer questions regarding work projects whilst on stage during Q&A panels. Event artwork had to be altered significantly so as to not display anything other than the actors actual facial likeness instead of including images of characters played while other issues included the actors not being allowed to have character images to sign for fans on their tables, and instead headshots were used. All of these changes marked a significant change from the normal comic convention experience.

== Show features ==
=== Celebrity guests ===
As with many other fan convention events, celebrity guests from past and present popular media are regularly invited to Comic Con Scotland and are an extremely popular part of the event, posing for professional photographs with fans and providing autographs as well as giving fans the chance to meet them and chat in person. Monopoly Events is well known for bringing first-time guests to the UK, as well as guests that are from older cult film and television shows of past decades such as the 1980s and 1990s. Sometimes the celebrities involved will use their appearances to raise awareness and funds for a charity or cause important to them, while others use the opportunity to promote upcoming projects such as new films or television shows.

=== Celebrity panels ===
Most, if not all, of the celebrity guests at Comic Con Scotland, appear on stage at some point throughout the course of the event, answering both host and fan questions alike. At the first Comic Con Scotland event held at the Edinburgh International Conference Centre, the panels took place in a side auditorium with tiered seating. As of the 2019 event, which was the first to take place in the new and much larger Royal Highland Centre venue, the stage is built in the main hall where anyone on the floor is free to attend the talks.

=== Celebrity meet & greet experiences ===
Some of the celebrity guests agree to a 30-minute meet and greet experience, this experience is at an additional cost to the entry ticket, is much more intimate than meeting a guest at a signing table or photograph area, and takes place in a room away from the main event. During the experience the celebrity or celebrities will chat and mingle with up to 30 fans at a time, away from the louder main event crowds, sharing conversation and taking selfie photographs as souvenirs.

=== Photographs ===
Comic Con Scotland includes a professional photoshoot area where fans can have their photo taken with their favourite guest or guests before collecting them at the exit of the area. Some headliner guests (such as Ewan McGregor in 2022 and The Vampire Diaries stars Paul Wesley and Ian Somerhalder in 2023), have their own exclusive area for photographs and autographs, this prevents queuing time and size issues and timeslots are issued for fans to be able to meet the guests.

=== Autographs ===
The event also includes an autograph area where celebrity guests from film and TV sign items for the public and spend a few minutes chatting with their fans.

=== Cosplay ===
A large part of the event is devoted to the cosplay hobby where members of the public are allowed, and encouraged, to take part in dressing up as characters from popular genres such as film and television. Cosplaying has become one of the most popular parts of many fan conventions around the world and can be used as a platform to showcase the costumer's latest handywork, to show devotion to their favourite characters or engage in role-play with other cosplayers in the same series, as well as to meet new people with mutual interests as themselves. The Comic Con Scotland event, like all of the Monopoly Events shows, hosts a cosplay competition every year with both adult and child participation encouraged and prizes given for the best costumes.

=== Prop and set exhibits ===
Monopoly Events exhibits a vast array of props and set builds at Comic Con Scotland, such as a full-sized X-wing fighter from Star Wars, the Tardis from Doctor Who, the DeLorean Time Machine from Back to the Future, a full-sized Peterbilt Truck from Transformers and other props.

=== Retro gaming area ===
Comic Con Scotland has a large area dedicated to retro gaming consoles for visitors to play.

=== Trader zone ===
Within the main exhibition hall, there is a large trader zone that contains many dealers selling film and television, comic and science fiction related memorabilia, comics, games, artwork, toys and collectibles.

=== Artists alley ===
The event has a large Artists Alley section within the trader zone where the public can meet published comic book artists and buy pieces of their work, as well as independent artists who are selling their original work.

== Location, dates and notable guests ==
| Dates | Location | Notable guests |
|---|---|---|
| 10–11 November 2018 | Edinburgh International Conference Centre | Lou Ferrigno, David Hasselhoff, Sam J. Jones, Ray Parker Jr. (first UK convention appearance), Zach Galligan, Rex Smith, Bret "The Hitman" Hart (first UK convention appearance), Dirk Benedict, Herbert Jefferson Jr. (first UK convention appearance), Jack Stauffer (first UK convention appearance), Terry Carter (first UK convention appearance), Sylvester McCoy, Sophie Aldred, Gil Gerard, Robert MacNaughton (first UK convention appearance) |
| 12–13 October 2019 | Royal Highland Centre | Jean-Claude Van Damme (first UK convention appearance), Mark Calaway aka WWE Superstar The Undertaker, Christopher Lloyd, Kim Coates, Tommy Flanagan, Mark Boone Jr., Bolo Yeung (first UK convention appearance), Michel Qissi (first UK convention appearance), Burt Young, Judge Reinhold, John Ashton (first UK convention appearance), Karyn Parsons, Burt Young, Jason David Frank, Jimmy Vee, Marty Jannetty, Tim Rose |
| 8–9 October 2022 | Royal Highland Centre | Ewan McGregor, Anthony Daniels, Jimmy Vee, Angus MacInnes, Denis Lawson, Candice King, Daniel Gillies, Michael Malarkey, Kayla Ewell, David Anders, Dan Fogler, Alicia Silverstone, Billy Zane, Ross Marquand, James Marsters, Roger L. Jackson, Graham McTavish, John Rhys-Davies, Noah Hathaway, Tami Stronach, Rob Van Dam, James Tolkan, Claudia Wells, Peter Cullen, Frank Welker, Mara Wilson, Jodi Benson, Paul Riley, Jane McCarry, Gavin Mitchell, Sanjeev Kohli, Rob Weithoff, Roger Clark, Benjamin Byron Davis, Alex McKenna, Doug Cockle, Carlos Ferro, J. Michael Tatum, Ricco Fajardo, Brandon McInnes, Arryn Zech, Jamie Marchi, Diane Youdale, Tim Cappello |
| 7–8 October 2023 | Royal Highland Centre | Alec Utgoff, Andy Serkis, Barry Pearl, Cameron Monaghan, Colton Haynes, Crystal Reed, Didi Conn, Dinah Manoff, Elijah Wood, Genevieve Padalecki, Giancarlo Esposito, Holland Roden, Hunter Doohan, Ian Somerhalder, Jacob Bertrand, Jamie Donnelly, Jared Padalecki, John Barrowman, Kat Graham, Kelly Ward, Lana Parrilla, Linden Ashby, Mark Sheppard, Matt Smith, Michael Tucci, Neil Fanning, Paul Blackthorne, Paul Wesley, Peyton List, Randal Kleiser, Robin Lord Taylor, Robin Shou, Samantha Smith, Stephen Amell, Tom Payne, Zach Galligan |
| 5–6 October 2024 | Royal Highland Centre | Simon Pegg, Misha Collins, Kathryn Newton, Jim Beaver, Rob Benedict, Ruth Connell, Mark Pellegrino, DJ Qualls, Charlie Cox, Pom Klementieff, Sean Gunn, Catherine Tate, Melissa Joan Hart, Beth Broderick, Caroline Rhea, James Storm, Mary Mouser, Tanner Buchanan, Martin Kove, Paul Walter Hauser, Jesse Kove, Nadia Hilker, Matt Ryan, Mark Williams, Sean Pertwee, Jason Patric, Billy Wirth, Mick Foley, Rikishi, Craig Charles, Chris Barrie, Danny John-Jules, Abby Trott, Peggy (a.k.a. Dogpool) |
| 11–12 October 2025 | Royal Highland Centre | Hayden Christensen, Rosario Dawson, Eman Esfandi, Diana Lee Inosanto, Joonas Suotamo, Joseph Morgan, Chris Wood, Kat Graham, Persia White, Doug Jones, Billie Piper, Xolo Maridueña, Patrick Luwis, Sophia Di Martino, Jack Veal, Emily Swallow, Nadji Jeter, Andrew McCarthy, Jonathan Silverman, Neil Newbon, Theo Solomon, Jennifer English, Mia Foo, Aliona Baranova, Maggie Robertson, Katherine McNamara, Matthew Daddario, Brandon Routh, Michelle Gomez, Paul Anderson, Tara Reid, Shannon Elizabeth, Steve Whitmire, Sting (last UK convention appearance), Amy Dumas (a.k.a. Lita), Kevin Nash, Tyler Mane, Ted DiBiase, C. Thomas Howell, Will Mellor, Ricky Tomlinson, Michael Winslow, Peggy (a.k.a. Dogpool) |
| 24–25 October 2026 | Royal Highland Centre | Jensen Ackles, Misha Collins, Mark Sheppard, Noah Schnapp, Jamie Campbell Bower, Cara Buono, Ralph Macchio, William Zabka, Martin Kove, William Shatner, John Cleese, Tamara Taylor, T. J. Thyne, Charisma Carpenter, Julie Benz, Tyler Hoechlin, Tom Welling, Erica Durance, WWE Superstar Paige (a.k.a. Saraya Bevis), Trish Stratus, Mick Foley, Eliza Taylor, Bob Morley, Marie Avgeropoulos, Zach McGowan, David Hayter, Tommy Flanagan, Kim Coates, Mark Boone Jr., Nick Pauley (a.k.a. Dancepool), Cam Clarke, Rob Paulsen, Townsend Coleman, Renae Jacobs, Lewis Tan, Manu Bennett, Mena Suvari, Billy West, Phil LaMarr, David O'Hara, Tony Robinson |
| 9–10 October 2027 | Royal Highland Centre | |

== See also ==
- List of comic book conventions
- Comic book convention
- List of multigenre conventions
