= Comic Con Wales =

Fan convention in Newport, Wales

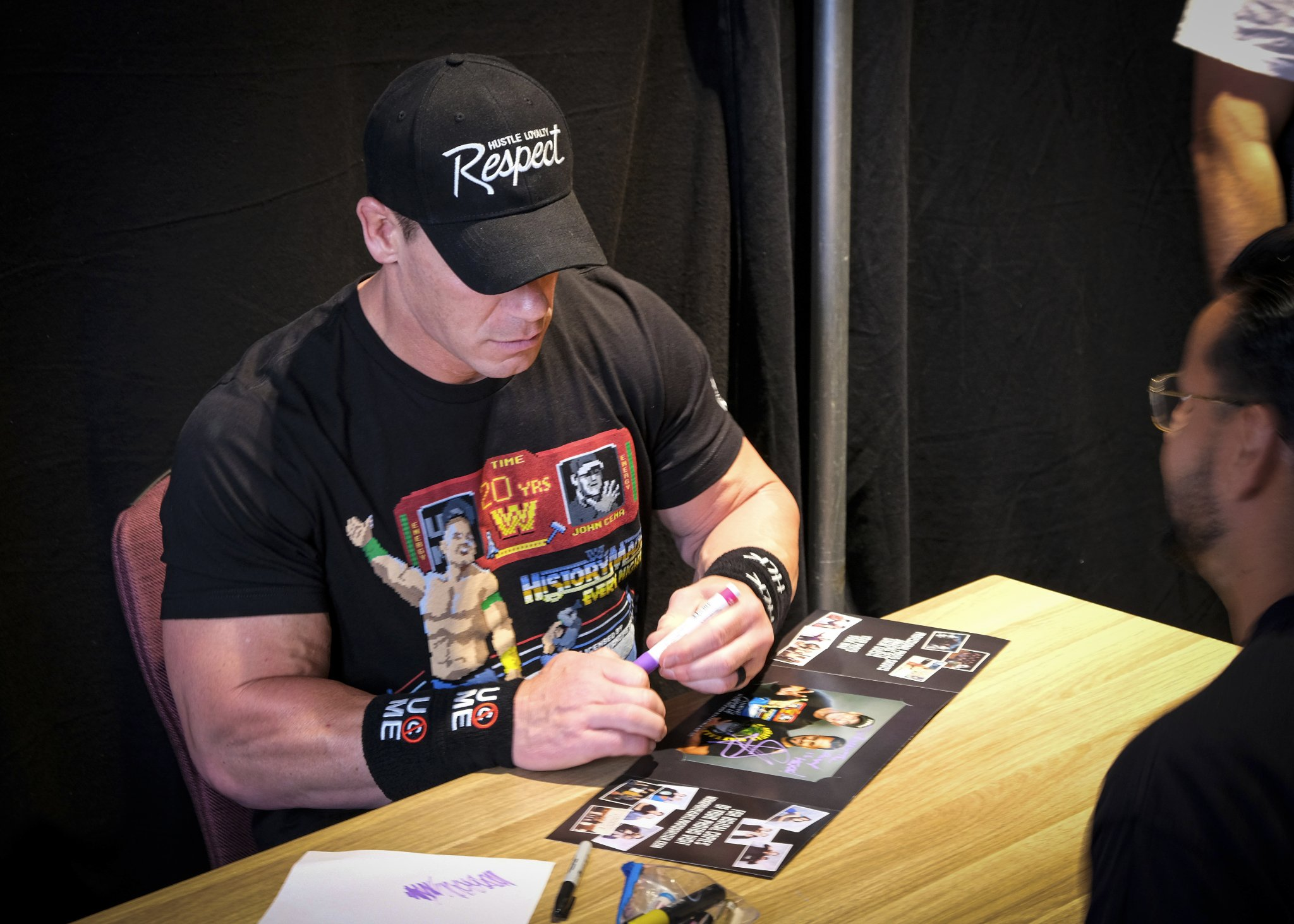
- Wrestling star John Cena signing an autograph for a fan at Comic Con Wales 2022
- Status: Active
- Genre: Multigenre, covering popular culture elements including sci-fi, horror, fantasy, mainstream, wrestling and more
- Venue: International Convention Centre Wales
- Location: Newport, Wales
- Inaugurated: 6–7 August 2022
- Most recent: 8–9 August 2026
- Next event: 7–8 August 2027
- Attendance: 18,000+ (August 2025 event)
- Organiser: Monopoly Events
- Website: www.comicconventionwales.co.uk

Comic Con Wales is a fan convention held once a year in the city of Newport, Wales, in the United Kingdom. It attracts 12,000+ attendees to the International Convention Centre Wales in Newport, and celebrates films, cult television, video gaming, anime, cosplay and comic books. It is organised by UK-based events company Monopoly Events.

== History and organisation ==
Comic Con Wales began its annual run of events in 2022 when the obvious need for a large pop culture convention on Welsh soil arose. Monopoly Events CEO Andy Kleek sourced a venue large enough to not only launch a first event from, but also house future expansion plans for the event in order to make a substantial event for the people of Wales to be proud of and to bring economic drive into the community.

Monopoly Events is a Manchester-based event organisation company that specialises in events held in the north west of England and Scotland. Along with the Wales event, they are also responsible for organising Comic Con Liverpool, Comic Con Scotland, Comic Con Scotland Aberdeen, Comic Con Northern Ireland, Comic Con Manchester, Comic Con Northern Ireland, Comic Con North East, Comic Con Midlands Telford, Comic Con Midlands Birmingham, Comic Con London, Comic Con Ireland, For the Love of Wrestling, For the Love of Horror, For the Love of MMA, For the Love of Cosplay, For the Love of Darts, For the Love of Vampire Diaries, For the Love of Anime, For the Love of Time & Space, For the Love of Supernatural, For the Love of Retro, For the Love of The Force, For the Love of Time and Space, Comic Con Czech Republic, Comic Con Poland and formerly Comic Con Yorkshire, For the Love of Sci-Fi and For the Love of Fantasy. There are also plans for further expansion across the UK including organizing Comic Con South West, Comic Con South East and Comic Con East Anglia in the future.

A two-day long event, the convention includes celebrity guest appearances from various film, television, video gaming, anime and comic book series including Buffy the Vampire Slayer, The Vampire Diaries, Lucifer, Teen Wolf, Superman and Lois, The Walking Dead, Gotham, Cobra Kai, Sabrina The Teenage Witch, Harry Potter, Star Wars, Stranger Things, The Lord of the Rings, Grand Theft Auto IV, Supernatural, Doctor Who, Torchwood, Arrow, Arrowverse, The Boys, Mighty Morphin Power Rangers, Red Dead Redemption 2, Rick and Morty and many others.

The convention is run between 3 floors of the whole of the ICC, the main exhibition hall features a large dealers zone selling movie, comic, and science fiction related memorabilia, artwork, and collectibles as well as various film props and sets, vehicles from different franchises, celebrity guest professional photoshoots and autograph sessions, cosplay events, and other displays.

== John Cena ==
In 2022 at the very first Comic Con Wales hosted by Monopoly Events in August 2023, wrestler and actor John Cena made a rare live appearance, and took part in an unscheduled panel answering questions from fans. When a young boy in the audience asked for Cena to sign his wrestling belt, a request which Cena readily agreed to do for free, another fan in the audience called out to the star asking why "[The fan with the belt] just got to go up, and I had to do work to pay to see you.", Cena responded by calling the second fan onto the stage to join him, and while attempting to make amends to the fan and the audience, caught the fan trying to take a selfie of Cena on his phone. Again, Cena responded graciously, ensuring the fan got a better photograph of the pair, and expressing his thanks that customers worked hard and chose to spend their money to meet him, before shaking his hand to a large round of applause. A clip of the exchange was caught on video at the time and has since gone viral.

== 2023 SAG-AFTRA Strike ==
The SAG-AFTRA Strike of 2023, affected many fan conventions worldwide. During the strike, SAG guidelines for appearances at fan conventions had to be followed by both guests and the convention organisers. While appearing at any event, guests were unable to discuss any past, present, or future work projects as they would normally do when meeting fans, they were also unable to answer questions regarding work projects while on stage during Q&A panels. Event artwork had to be altered significantly so as to not display anything other than the actors actual facial likeness instead of including images of characters played, while other issues included the actors not being allowed to have character images to sign for fans on their tables, and instead headshots were used. All of these changes marked a significant change from the normal comic convention experience.

== Show features ==
=== Celebrity guests ===
As with many other fan convention events, celebrity guests from past and present popular media are regularly invited to Comic Con Wales and are an extremely popular part of the event, posing for professional photographs with fans and providing autographs, as well as giving fans the chance to meet them and chat in person. Monopoly Events is well known for bringing first-time guests to the UK as well as guests from older cult film and television shows of past decades, such as the 1980s and 1990s. Sometimes the celebrities involved will use their appearances to raise awareness and funds for a charity or cause important to them, while others use the opportunity to promote upcoming projects such as new films or television shows.

=== Celebrity panels ===
Most, if not all, of the celebrity guests at Comic Con Wales appear on stage at some point throughout the course of the event, answering both host and fan questions alike. These panels take place in the venue's auditorium with tiered seating for more comfort and to provide a more intimate experience for fans.

=== Photographs ===
Comic Con Wales includes a professional photoshoot area where fans can have their photo taken with their favourite guest or guests before collecting them at the exit of the area. Some headliner guests (such as John Cena in 2022 and then The Vampire Diaries stars Paul Wesley and Ian Somerhalder in 2023) have their own exclusive area for photographs and autographs; this prevents queuing time and size issues, and timeslots are issued for fans to be able to meet the guests.

=== Autographs ===
The event also includes an autograph area where celebrity guests from film and TV sign items for the public and spend a few minutes chatting with their fans.

=== Cosplay ===
A large part of the event is devoted to the cosplay hobby, where members of the public are allowed and encouraged to take part in dressing up as characters from popular genres such as film and television. Cosplaying has become one of the most popular parts of many fan conventions around the world and can be used as a platform to showcase the costumer's latest handywork, to show devotion to their favorite characters or engage in role-play with other cosplayers in the same series, as well as to meet new people with mutual interests as themselves. The Comic Con Wales event, like all of the Monopoly Events shows, hosts an annual cosplay competition across all of the Comic Con events, with both adult and child participation encouraged and prizes given for the best costumes. This includes a cosplay masquerade on both days of the event, and with the local heat of the annual competition on Saturday, the finalist from the Wales heat goes through to the finals, which take place at Comic Con Liverpool each year.

=== Prop and set exhibits ===
Monopoly Events is famous for providing a vast array of props and set builds for its visitors to enjoy, with Comic Con Wales being no exception, visitors can find exhibits such as a full-sized X-wing fighter from Star Wars, the Tardis from Doctor Who, the DeLorean Time Machine from Back to the Future, a full-sized Peterbilt Truck from Transformers, a talking Falkor head from The NeverEnding Story film which guests could sit atop of and have a photograph taken as well as the Swamp of Sadness from the same film and Del Boy's flat from the cult British television show Only Fools and Horses and much more. New props and sets that have been introduced since the 2022 event include the Mystic Grill from The Vampire Diaries, the Cobra Kai dojo from Cobra Kai, the Myagi-Do dojo, the Fiat Cinquecento from The Inbetweeners and more, many of which are used with celebrities in photoshoots.

=== Retro gaming area and other attractions ===
Comic Con Wales has a large area dedicated to retro gaming consoles for visitors to play; this includes tournaments, big-screen battles, and races between gamers. There are also areas offering the public opportunities to play tabletop board games like Dungeons & Dragons, Warhammer and more.

=== Trader zone ===
Within the main exhibition hall, there is a vast trader zone that contains 100s of dealers selling film and television, comic and science fiction-related memorabilia, comics, games, artwork, toys, and collectibles. As of August 2023, a smaller "Artists and Makers" zone will be added to the event, featuring arts and crafts for sale in a smaller area by independent artists and small businesses specialising in small handmade items.

=== Artists alley ===
The event has a large Artists Alley section, which is situated inside the main hall, where the public can meet published comic book artists and authors and buy pieces of their work.

== Location, dates and notable guests ==
Dates	Location	Notable guests
6-7 August 2022	International Conference Centre Wales	Aimee Garcia, Alex Garfin, Bitsie Tulloch, Chandler Riggs, David Mazouz, DB Woodside, Dylan Sprayberry, Ed Westwick, Gianni DeCenzo, Hannah Kepple, James Marsters, Jenna Leigh Green, Jesse Kove, Joey Cramer, John Cena, Lesley-Ann Brandt, Linden Ashby, Martin Kove, Melissa Joan Hart, Peyton List, Robin Lord Taylor, Steven Ogg, Tom Payne, Tyler Hoechlin, Tyler Posey
12-13 August 2023	International Conference Centre Wales	Alec Utgoff, Claudia Wells, Colin Baker, Danny Glover, Donald Fullilove, Gareth David-Lloyd, Harry Waters Jr., Ian Somerhalder, Ioan Gruffudd, James Tolkan, Kai Owen, Kim Coates, Mark Boone Junior, Mark Williams, Michael Rooker, Paul Blake, Paul McGann, Paul Wesley, Peter Davison, Sean Gunn, Sophie Aldred, Sylvester McCoy, Tommy Flanagan, William Fichtner
10-11 August 2024	International Conference Centre Wales	Jensen Ackles, Danneel Ackles, Mark Sheppard, Samantha Smith, DJ Qualls, Kurt Fuller, Sean Astin, Stephen Amell, Colton Haynes, John Barrowman, Gareth David-Lloyd, Kai Owen, Matt Ryan, Brandon Routh, Laz Alonso, Jessie T. Usher, Giancarlo Esposito, Kat Graham, Seth Gilliam, Ross Marquand, Cooper Andrews, Amy Jo Johnson, David Yost, Roger Clark, Rob Wiethoff, Warwick Davis, Annabelle Davis, Harrison Davis
9-10 August 2025	International Conference Centre Wales	Laurence Fishburne, Misha Collins, Billie Piper, Michelle Gomez, David Bradley, Chris Rankin, Kevin Nash, Amy Dumas (a.k.a. Lita), Tyler Mane, Jake "The Snake" Roberts, Matt Ryan, Graham McTavish, David Hayter, Quinton Flynn, Erika Eleniak, Sean Pertwee, Ian Cardoni, Harry Belden, Spencer Grammer, Will Mellor, Ralf Little, Ricky Tomlinson, Michael Winslow, Anton Lesser, Robert Emms, Jimmy Vee, Julian Glover, Leigh Gill, Jack Veal, Peggy (a.k.a. Dogpool)
8-9 August 2026	International Conference Centre Wales	Noah Schnapp, Peter Capaldi, Cameron Monaghan, Kat Graham, WWE Superstar Paige (a.k.a. Saraya Bevis), Trish Stratus, Mickie James, Felicia Day, Kim Rhodes, Briana Buckmaster, Emily Swallow, Edward James Olmos, Mary McDonnell, Jamie Bamber, Eliza Taylor, Bob Morley, Casper Van Dien, Dina Meyer, Michael Ironside, Jake Busey, Steven Ogg, Ned Luke, Shawn Fonteno, Billy West, Amber Benson, Julie Benz, Kristine Sutherland, Clare Kramer, Sarah Hagan, Bart Johnson, Tony Robinson, Jenette Goldstein, Mark Rolston, William Hope
7-8 August 2027	International Conference Centre Wales	

== See also ==
- List of comic book conventions
- Comic book convention
- List of multigenre conventions
