= For the Love of Horror =

Horror fan convention

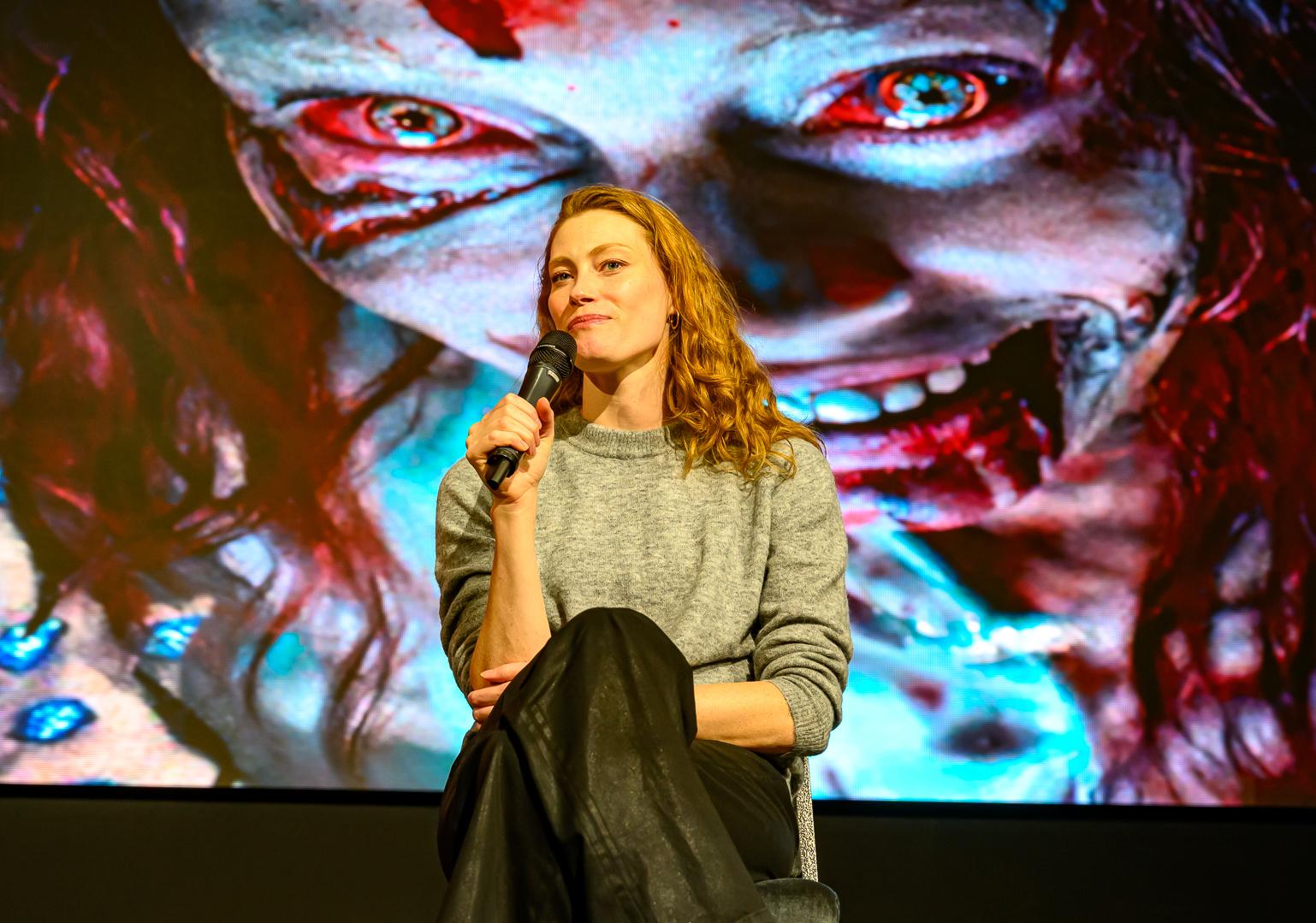
- Evil Dead Rises star Alyssa Sutherland speaks to fans at her panel at For the Love of Horror 2023
- Status: Active
- Genre: Horror
- Venue: Bowlers Exhibition Centre
- Locations: Trafford Park, Greater Manchester, UK
- Inaugurated: 2018
- Most recent: 19–20 October 2024
- Next event: 18-19 October 2025
- Attendance: 16,000k+ (2024 event)
- Organizer: Monopoly Events
- Website: www.fortheloveofhorroruk.com

For the Love of Horror is a fan convention crossed with a haunted attraction held annually in Manchester, UK that celebrates the horror genre in various formats such as horror films, horror fiction, horror comics, horror video games, and horror cosplay which is organised by UK Events company Monopoly Events.

== History and organisation ==
For the Love of Horror has been running since 2018 when Monopoly Events CEO Andy Kleek saw a gap in the market for an original horror-themed fan convention to run alongside the company's other already successful genre fan convention For the Love of Sci-Fi. Kleek liked the idea of haunted attractions, also known as scare attractions, which originally began in England in 1915 but which were made universally popular in America during the 1980s and 1990s, and wanted to combine something similar with a standard fan convention like the company's already well established For the Love of Sci-Fi science fiction themed convention held since 2015 in Bowlers Exhibition Centre in Manchester.

Monopoly Events is a Manchester-based event organization company that specializes in events held in the North West of England and Scotland. Along with the For the Love of Horror event, they are also responsible for organising Comic Con Liverpool, Comic Con Scotland, Comic Con Wales, For the Love of Wrestling, For the Love of Sci-Fi, For the Love of Wrestling, Comic Con Manchester, For the Love of MMA, Comic Con Northern Ireland and Comic Con Scotland Aberdeen with new events, Comic Con Northeast and Comic Con Yorkshire joining the fold in 2023 and plans for further expansion across the UK including into London in 2024.

The first For the Love of Horror event ran over two consecutive days in October 2018 and was well received by the public for a relatively unknown event, with approximately 5,000 visitors across the weekend. The event completely sold out for the reunion of the cast of The Lost Boys in 2019, and has since completely sold out in both 2022 and again in 2023.

The convention consistently includes celebrity guest appearances from various horror films, television shows, horror video games including classic franchises such as Friday the 13th, Halloween, The Lost Boys, Candyman, Saw, Child's Play, The Walking Dead and others.

== Notable events ==
House of 1000 Corpses actor Sid Haig was due to appear at the 2019 event, but passed away the month before on September 21, 2019, from Aspiration Pneumonitis triggered by Aspergillus Pneumonia at the age of 80. Haig was due to appear alongside fellow co-star Bill Moseley who still attended the event next to Haig's empty signing table, which was kept as a mark of respect for the actor. Fans were invited to visit Haig's table to sign a memorial book and encouraged to leave a donation (which was eventually given to Haig's wife) in exchange for an especially designed poster of the actor commissioned for the event. The event also observed a one-minute silence in honor of Haig during the event on both days at 12pm GMT which rendered the entire event silent.

While originally advertised as a non-specific horror fan convention as per the 2018 event, the 2019 For the Love of Horror quickly became known and advertised as the "biggest Lost Boys reunion in history" as the vast majority of the 1987 movie's cast including actors Kiefer Sutherland, Jason Patric, Alex Winter, Jamison Newlander, and Billy Wirth, along with musicians from the film G Tom Mac and Tim Cappello, appeared at the event and were reunited for the first time in over 30 years. Both G Tom Mac and Cappello performed separate live music sets on the event stage to a vast crowd of fans on both days of the event, while Cappello performed a third time at the event after-party. The entire cast posed together for photographs in a purpose-built "cave" set modeled on the vampire cave seen in The Lost Boys original movie which was complete with a poster of Jim Morrison, a bottle of fake blood and David the vampire's wheelchair.

The 2021 event included an actual and non-staged fan wedding, live on stage in front of thousands of attendees. Cappello appeared on stage at the end of the ceremony to congratulate the couple.

Corey Taylor, of the bands Slipknot and Stonesour among others, was announced as a guest for the event in early 2022. He appeared in a pre-event concert as well as at a signing table during the actual event, and fans were also able to meet Taylor and have photo opportunities with him.

At the 2023 event, instead of an opening night concert there was an opening party which included a closed screening of The Lost Boys in the venue, along with a live commentary from star Jason Patric who played main protagonist Michael Emerson in the film. This was followed by a preview screening of the newest production from filmmaker Eli Roth entitled Thanksgiving, at a nearby cinema which was sponsored by Sony as was the entire 2023 event. The weekend also included live music on stage from G Tom Mac and Terrifier 2 actress Leah Voysey.

== 2023 SAG-AFTRA Strike ==
The SAG-AFTRA Strike of 2023 affected many fan conventions worldwide. During the strike, SAG guidelines for appearances at fan conventions had to be followed by both guests and the convention organisers. Whilst appearing at any event, guests were unable to discuss any past, present or future work projects as they would normally do when meeting fans, they were also unable to answer questions regarding work projects whilst on stage during Q&A panels. Event artwork had to be altered significantly so as to not display anything other than the actors actual facial likeness instead of including images of characters played while other issues included the actors not being allowed to have character images to sign for fans on their tables, and instead headshots were used. All of these changes marked a significant change from the normal comic convention experience.

== Venue ==
For the Love of Horror is held exclusively at Bowlers Exhibition Centre, situated in Trafford Park, Stretford, Greater Manchester. The venue is also the site of many raves and music events including Sidewinder and Manchester Adored, conventions such as For the Love of Sci-Fi and Comic Con Manchester, various food and drink expositions and regular boxing and mixed martial arts (MMA) events, darts championships and tours and other sporting events. It is also home to a gym with a boxing ring, a Caribbean themed café-bar and a fan-built replica of the Mos Eisley Cantina from the Star Wars universe which doubles as a functioning bar and an escape room.

The event runs across the entirety of the arena, including the Cantina Space Bar, which is often used for after-parties as well as being open to visitors for the duration of the event. The main exhibition hall, Trafford Arena 1, is home to various film sets (something for which the Monopoly Events is famous for, making their event experiences very different from others like them within the UK), a stage for celebrity guest question and answer panels and also live music performances, celebrity guest professional photoshoots and autograph sessions, cosplay events, and other displays. As of 2019, the smaller Trafford Arena 2 features a large dealers zone selling horror-related memorabilia, artwork and collectibles. Prior to this the scare maze could be found in this area while the dealers area could be found in the main exhibit hall, for the 2019 event, the decision was made to move the scare maze into the slightly smaller Bridgewater Arena to allow for more room for visitors in the dealers zone. A smaller suite called the Trafford Suite is home to various horror-themed props that are in place for fans to take free photographs while a small funfair can be found at the front of the venue as well as a food court area.

In 2023 the venue had many of the inside walls removed and was opened up into a much more accessible and open plan arena. The scare maze was removed from inside the event making the entire venue easier to walk around.

== Location, dates and notable guests ==
Dates	Location	Notable guests
20–21 October 2018	Bowlers Exhibition Centre	Danny Trejo, Christine Elise, Alex Vincent, Tyler Mane, Eileen Dietz, Nathan Head, Ilona Six, Ola Ray, Chris McKorkindale, Richard Brake and Barbara Nedeljakova
19–20 October 2019	Bowlers Exhibition Centre	Kiefer Sutherland, Jason Patric, Alex Winter, Jamison Newlander, Billy Wirth, G Tom Mac, Tim Cappello, Tobin Bell, Shawnee Smith, Costas Mandylor, Kane Hodder, Bill Moseley, Fred Dekker, Spencer Wilding, Brandon Crane, Adam Faraizl, Ben Heller, Emily Perkins, Marlon Taylor, and Jarred Blancard
16–17 October 2021	Bowlers Exhibition Centre	Matthew Lillard, Skeet Ulrich, Tim Curry, Barry Bostwick, Patricia Quinn, Christopher Biggins, Stephen Calcutt, Adrienne King, Thom Mathews, CJ Graham, Tom Atkins, Tom McLoughlin, Michael Cudlitz, Rachel True, Lochlyn Munro, Jon Abrahams, Dave Sheridan, Richard Brake, Felissa Rose, Grant Cramer, Suzanne Snyder, Jeffrey Voorhees, Alex Vincent, Andre Gower, Ryan Lambert, Andrew Bryniarski, Sandy Johnson, Tim Cappello
22–23 October 2022	Bowlers Exhibition Centre	Corey Taylor, David Arquette, Roger L. Jackson, Sean Pertwee, Darren Morfitt, Craig Conway, Neil Marshall, David Naughton, Scout Taylor Compton, Danielle Harris, Naomi Grossman, David Howard Thornton, Samantha Scaffidi, Damien Leone, William Ragsdale, Amanda Bearse, Stephen Geoffreys, Ari Lehman, Ira Heiden, Jennifer Rubin, Ken Sagoes, Bradley Gregg, Rodney Eastman, Harvey Stephens, Louise and Lisa Burns, Zach Galligan, Tim Cappello
12–13 November 2023	Bowlers Exhibition Centre	Alex Winter, Alyssa Sutherland, Billy Wirth, Brad Dourif, Chris Sarandon, Clare Higgins, Costas Mandylor, Dana DeLorenzo, Derek Mears, Don Shanks, Douglas Tait, Eduardo Sanchez, Elliott Fullham, Fiona Dourif, G Tom Mac, Heather Donahue, James Jude Courtney, Jason Patric, Jenna Jameson, John Jarratt, Kiefer Sutherland, Lauren Lavera, Leah Voysey, Lou Diamond Phillips, Michael C. Williams, Nick Castle, Patty Mullen, Quinn Lord, Ray Santiago, Tom Morga, William Forsythe
19–20 October 2024	Bowlers Exhibition Centre	Adrienne Barbeau, Amelia Kinkade, Betsy Baker, Bill Moseley, Brooke Smith, Catherine Corcoran, Chris Durand, David Clennon, Dina Meyer, Hal Delrich, Heather Matarazzo, James Duval, John Michael Graham, Katrina Bowden, Linnea Quigley, Lin Shaye, Margaret Anne Florence, Mason Mecartea, Michael Berryman, Peter Maloney, PJ Soles, Shawnee Smith, Stacey Nelkin, Theresa Tilly, Thomas G. Waites, Tim Cappello, Tom Atkins, Tom Fitzpatrick, Tommy Lee Wallace, Tyler Labine, Will Sandin

== See also ==
- Horror convention
- List of multigenre conventions
