= UKSC =

UKSC may refer to:

- United Kingdom Space Command
- Supreme Court of the United Kingdom
- UK Strength Council, a British sport governing body for strongmen competitions
- UK Space Conference
