= For the Love of Wrestling =

Wrestling fan convention in Manchester, UK

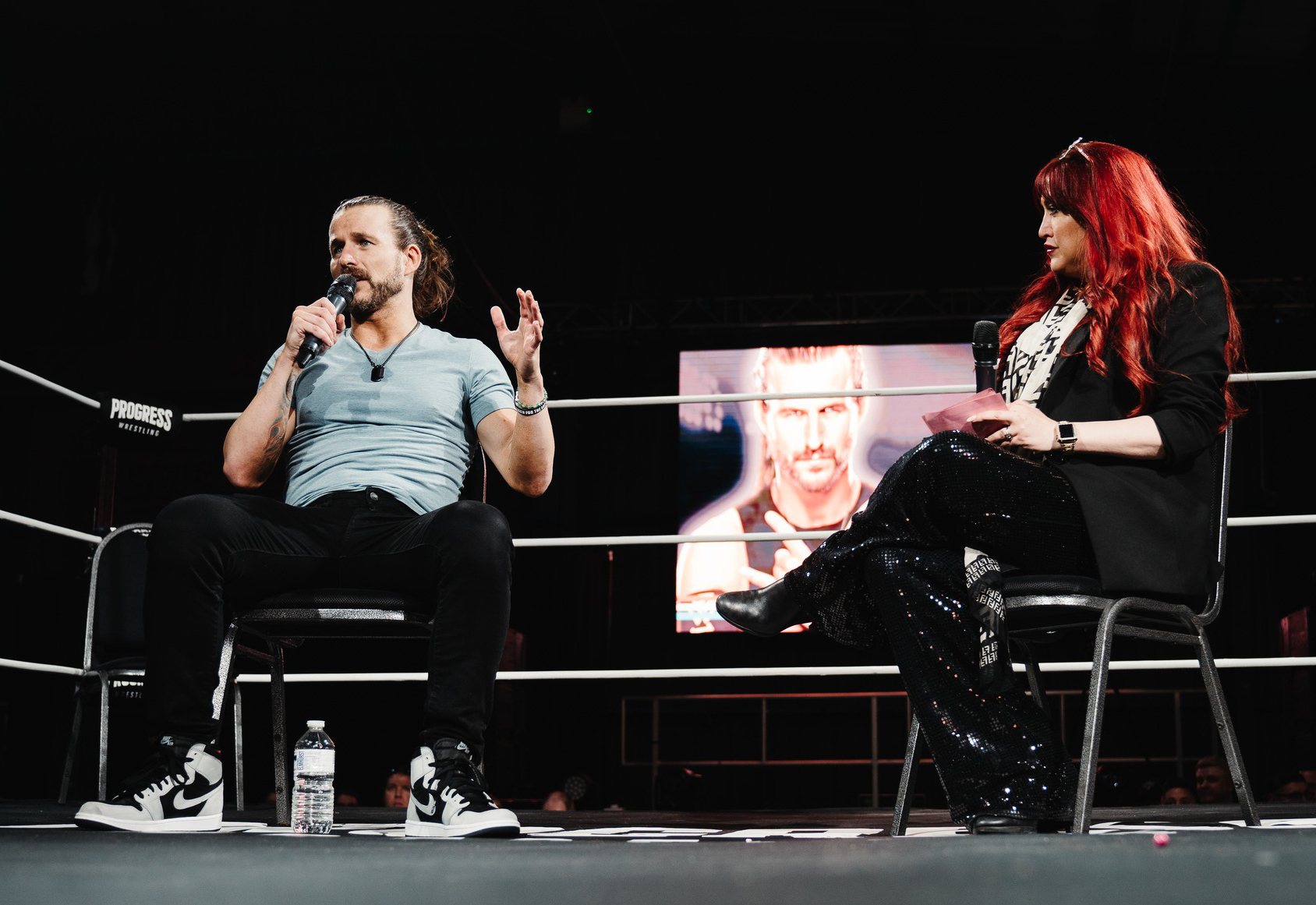
- SoCalVal interviews Adam Cole inside the ring at For the Love of Wrestling 2023
- Status: Active
- Genre: Wrestling
- Venue: Bowlers Exhibition Centre
- Locations: Trafford Park, Greater Manchester, England
- Inaugurated: 27–28 April 2019
- Most recent: 2025
- Next event: 21-22 February 2026
- Attendance: 10,000k+ (2023 event)
- Organizer: Monopoly Events
- Website: www.fortheloveofwrestling.co.uk

For the Love of Wrestling is a fan convention held annually in Manchester, England that celebrates the sport of professional wrestling, which is organised by UK Events company Monopoly Events.

== History and organisation ==
For the Love of Wrestling has been running since 2019 when Monopoly Events CEO Andy Kleek saw a gap in the market for a UK based wrestling fan convention after wrestling guests were extremely well received at other comic book conventions in 2018. The first two events took place in Exhibition Centre Liverpool while the last event in 2023 took place in Manchester.

Monopoly Events is a Manchester-based event organization company that specializes in events held in the North West of England and Scotland. Along with the For the Love of Wrestling event, they are also responsible for organising Comic Con Liverpool, Comic Con Scotland, Comic Con Wales, For the Love of Wrestling, For the Love of Horror, For the Love of Sci-Fi, Comic Con Manchester, For the Love of MMA, Comic Con Northern Ireland and Comic Con Scotland Aberdeen with new events, Comic Con Northeast and Comic Con Yorkshire joining the fold in 2023 and plans for further expansion across the UK including into London in 2024.

The first For the Love of Wrestling in 2019 was extremely well received by the public for a first-time event, with approximately 20,000 visitors many of who were there to see the wrestler The Undertaker, who was attending in his first ever UK fan convention appearance.

The convention consistently includes guest appearances from well known professional wrestlers from different companies representing the sport like WWE, TNA, WCW and others. Some guests are modern wrestlers who are still fighting to date such as Jungle Boy, MJF and Adam Cole while others are retired wrestlers such as Ted DiBiase, Bret Hart and more.

== Location, dates and notable guests ==
Dates	Location	Notable guests
27–28 April 2019	Exhibition Centre Liverpool	Booker T, Bret Hart, Brooklyn Brawler, Brutus Beefcake, Chris Jericho, Christian Cage, Emma, Eric Bischoff, Jim Duggan, Jimmy Hart, Kelly Kelly, Kevin Nash, Lita, Marty Jannetty, Pete Dunne, Rick Flair, Scott Hall, Sid Vicious, Summer Rae, Ted DiBiase, The Undertaker, Virgil
23–24 April 2022	Exhibition Centre Liverpool	Adam Scherr, Billy Gunn, Bo Dallas, Bray Wyatt, Candice Michelle, Earl Hebner, Erick Rowan, Fred Ottman, Grado, JBL, Jim Ross, Kurt Angle, Lanny Poffo, Lillian Garcia, Madusa, Mickie James, Mike Rotunda, MJF, Nick Aldis, Road Dogg, SoCal Val, Sting, Tatanka, The Nasty Boys, Torrie Wilson, Trish Stratus, Victoria
29–30 April 2023	Bowlers Exhibition Centre. Manchester	Adam Cole, Anna Jay, The Barbarian, Barry Darsow, Bill Eadie, Booker T, Britt Baker, Bryan Danielson, Bubba Ray, Carlito, Cash Wheeler, Dax Harwood, Diamond Dallas Page, D-Von, Bill Goldberg, Jamie Hayter, Jungle Boy, Kevin Nash, Mike Rotunda, Paul Roma, Big Show, Ruby Soho, Santino Marella, Sharmell, Ted DiBiase, Terri Runnels, The Warlord
2–3 March 2024	Bowlers Exhibition Centre. Manchester	Al Snow, CJ Perry, Dylan Postl, Elijah, Gangrel, Jake Hager, John Morrison, Ken Shamrock, Lita, Mandy Sacs, Marc Mero, Maria Kanellis, Matt Riddle, Nic Nemeth, Real1, Rhyno, Rikishi, Scott Steiner, Sean Waltman, Sgt Slaughter, Shelton Benjamin, Taya Valkyrie, Trish Stratus
15-16 February 2025	Bowlers Exhibition Centre. Manchester	Bradshaw, Tyler Breeze, Dana Brooke, Fandango, Debra, D-Lo Brown, Godfather, Grado, The Great Muta, Heath Slater, Jacqueline, Jake Roberts, JBL, Jinder Mahal, Lex Luger, Mark Henry, Mick Foley, Mike Chioda, The Mountie, Papa Shango, Ron Simmons, Sabu, Sean Mooney, Shane Douglas, Sonny Onoo, Sting, Tajiri
21-22 February 2026	Bowlers Exhibition Centre. Manchester	Bill Apter, Billy Gunn, Blue Meanie, Bobby Lashley, Brutus Beefcake, Luke Williams, Cassie Lee, Christy Hemme, Darby Allin, Doug Williams, Dustin Rhodes, Earl Hebner, Frankie Kazarian, Grado,Jessie McKay, Kevin Nash, Killer Kross, Kurt Angle, Rob Van Dam, Jerry The King Lawler, Jim Ross, Melina, Orange Cassidy, Samoa Joe, Saraya Bevis, Scarlett Bordeaux, Shotzi Blackheart, Swerve Strickland, The Great Khali, The Sandman

== See also ==
- Comic convention
- Fan convention
