= International Convention Centre Wales =

- Canolfan Gynadledda Rhyngwladol Cymru

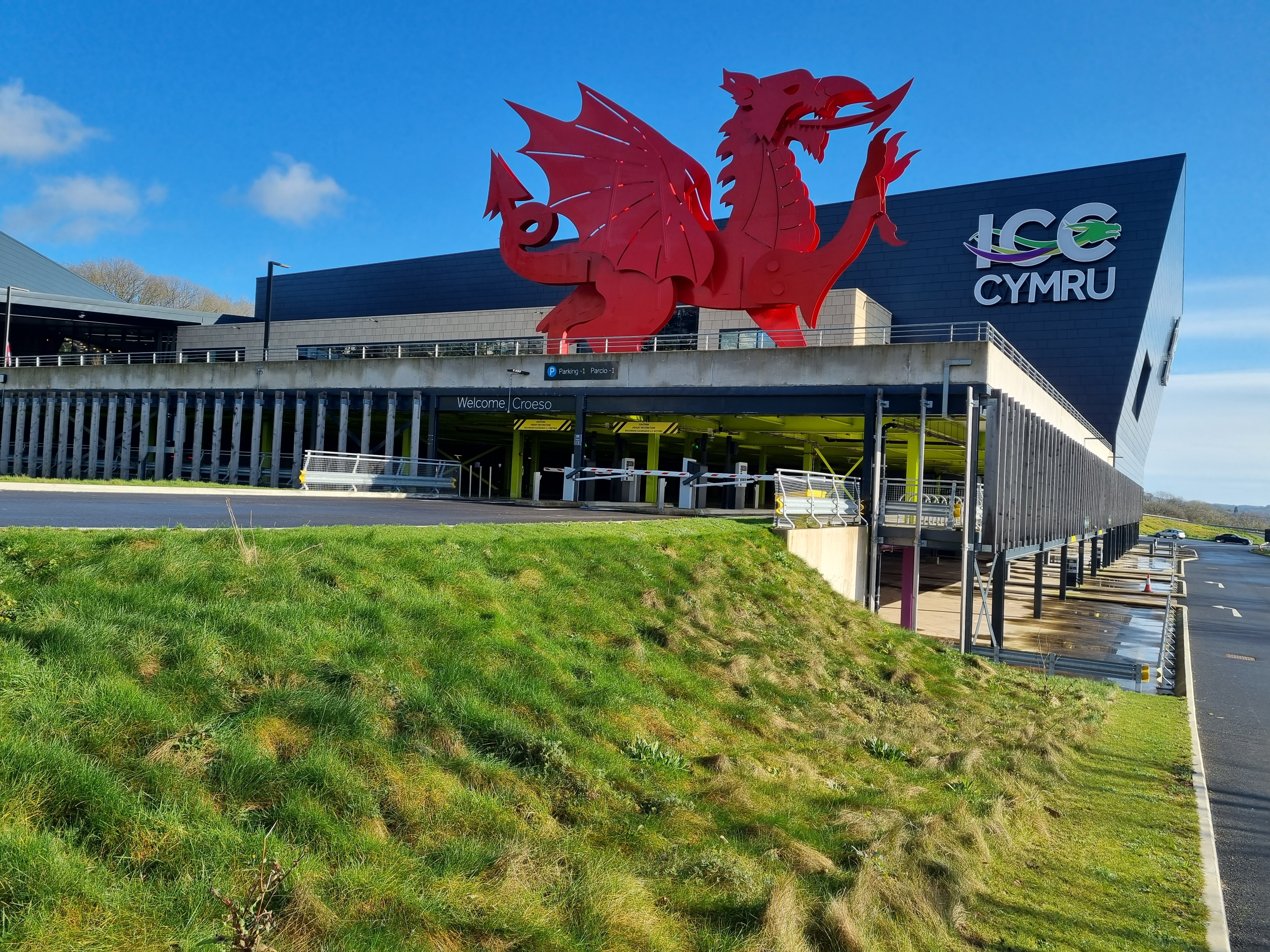
- Interactive map of the International Convention Centre Wales area

General information
- Type: Convention Centre
- Location: Newport, South Wales
- Coordinates: 51°36′09″N 02°55′44″W
- Construction started: June 2017
- Opened: 24 September 2019
- Cost: £84m
- Owner: Celtic Manor Resort and Welsh Government

Design and construction
- Architect: Scott Brownrigg
- Main contractor: Sisk Group

Website
- www.iccwales.com

The International Convention Centre Wales (ICC Wales) (Welsh: Canolfan Gynadledda Rhyngwladol Cymru) is a 5,000-capacity venue in the city of Newport, Wales. The venue has a main auditorium with fixed seating for 1,500 delegates, six rooms of exhibition space, and 43,000 sq ft (4,000 m^{2}) of pillar-free space. ICC Wales is located on the Celtic Manor Resort site which hosted the 2010 Ryder Cup and 2014 NATO summit.

The venue is a public/private enterprise with Welsh Government providing £22.5m grant funding and taking a 50/50 share of ownership with Celtic Manor.

== History ==
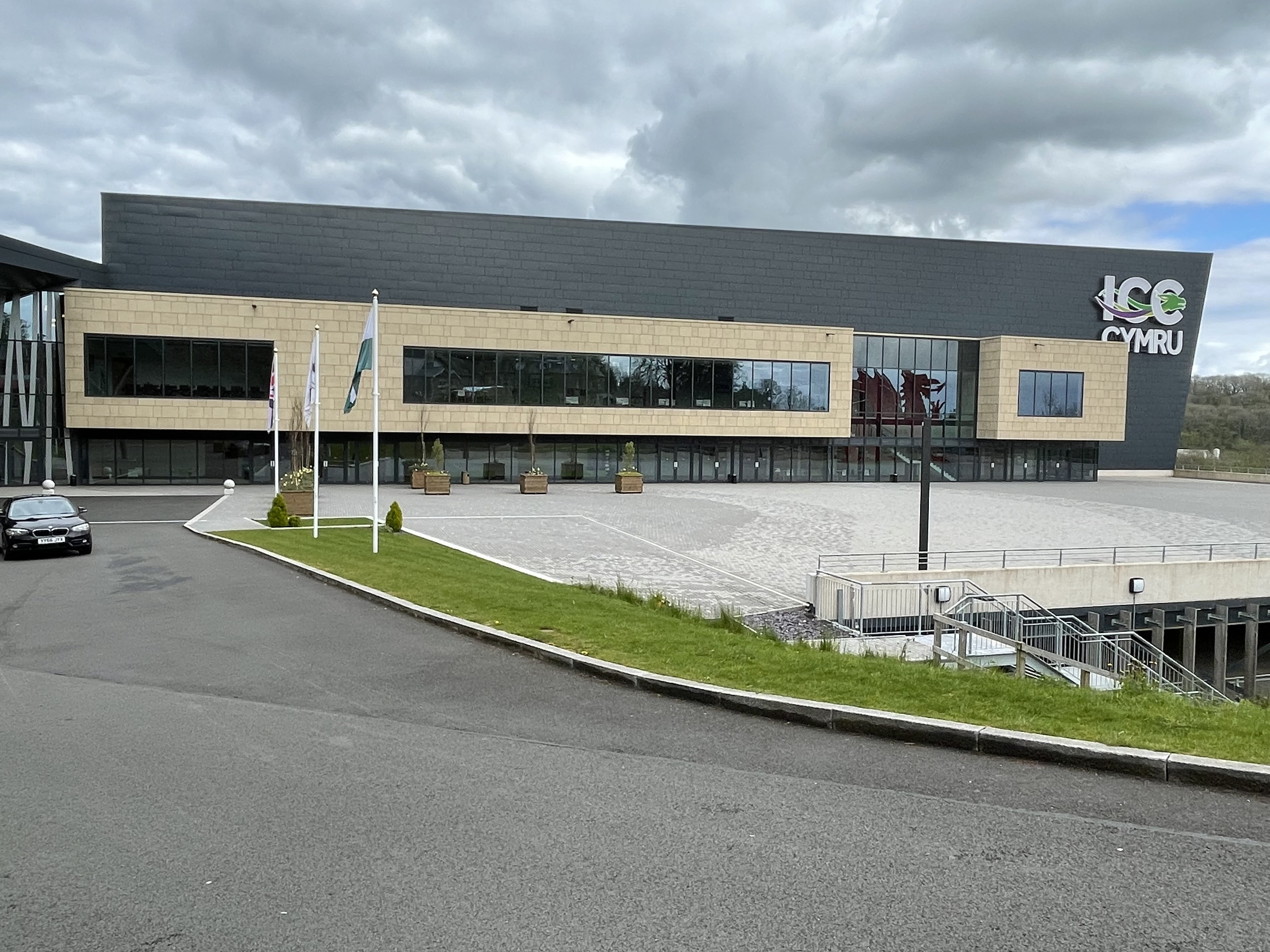
The ICC Wales from outside (2022)

The construction work, which was carried out by Sisk Group, began in 2017 and the facility opened its doors for the first time on the 14 September 2019. It was officially opened 24 September 2019.

== Floor space ==
The venue totals 26,000 square metres and has a stated delegate capacity of over 5,000. The main hall is approximately 4,000 sq metres and also has a 1,500 seated auditorium. The outdoor plaza is 2,500 sq metres.

== Transport ==
The venue is served by an hourly bus service from Newport railway station and Newport bus station, with a journey time of 25 minutes from the city centre to the venue door. The service runs between 6.25am and 6.35pm every hour at ten to the hour drop off and ten past the hour pickup.

It is four miles east of Newport city centre and the major road access is M4 motorway junction 24, then B4237 Chepstow Road. The site is equidistant from both Bristol Airport and Cardiff Airport (31 miles).

== Events ==
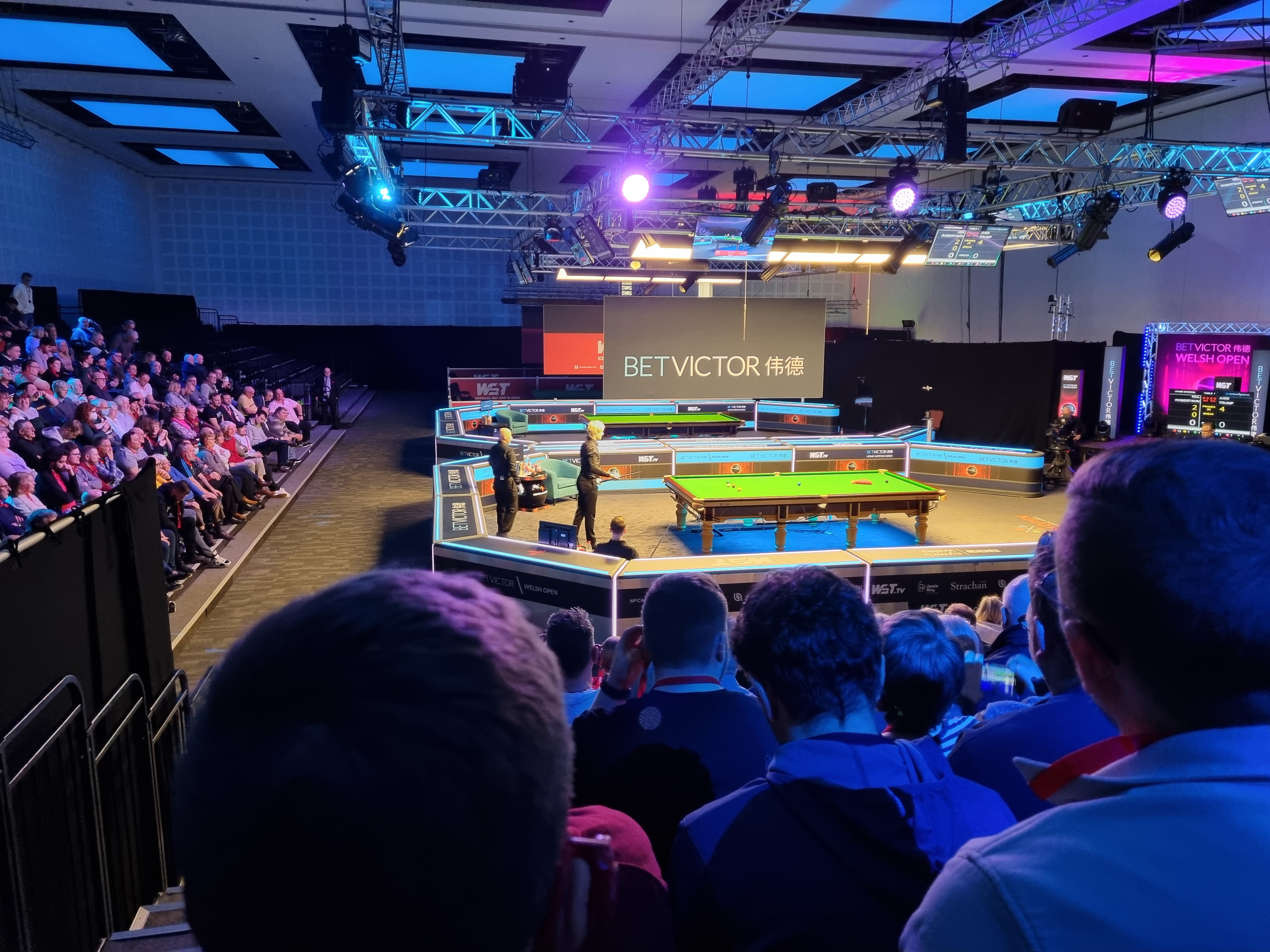
The venue hosting the 2022 Welsh Open

The first event held at the centre was the annual three-day Association of Stoma Care Nurses UK 2019 conference.

On 18 September 2019, the venue hosted the "An Experience With" series, where Arnold Schwarzenegger spoke to an audience. On 20 September the UK Independence Party held its annual party conference at the venue. The venue held the first BBC Cymru Wales Live debate on 22 September, which is a new Question Time style debate show focusing on Welsh issues. This was shortly followed by the inaugural UK Space Conference from 24 to 26 September, whose headline speaker was astronaut Tim Peake.

The venue hosted the WaterSource 19 conference on 1 October led by Welsh Water. This was followed by the Green Party of England and Wales national conference on 4 October.

The venue was used for the Welsh Open snooker events in 2021 and 2022.

In August 2022, Comic Con Wales (not Wales Comic Con) was hosted at the venue, organised by Monopoly Events. With another scheduled for August 2023.
