= 2022 Welsh Open (snooker) =

Snooker tournament

2022 BetVictor Welsh Open

Tournament information
- Dates: 28 February – 6 March 2022
- Venue: ICC Wales, Celtic Manor Resort
- City: Newport
- Country: Wales
- Organisation: World Snooker Tour
- Format: Ranking event
- Total prize fund: £405,000
- Winner's share: £70,000
- Highest break: Michael White (WAL) (142)

Final
- Champion: Joe Perry (ENG)
- Runner-up: Judd Trump (ENG)
- Score: 9–5

The 2022 Welsh Open (officially the 2022 BetVictor Welsh Open) was a professional snooker tournament that took place from 28 February to 6 March 2022 at the International Convention Centre Wales at the Celtic Manor Resort in Newport, Wales. It was the 12th ranking event of the 2021–22 snooker season, and the 31st edition of the Welsh Open, first held in 1992. It was the seventh of eight tournaments in the season's European Series, and the fourth and final event of the Home Nations Series. The tournament was broadcast by BBC Cymru Wales, BBC Online, BBC Red Button, Quest and Eurosport domestically.

Jordan Brown was the defending champion, having defeated Ronnie O'Sullivan 9–8 in the final of the 2021 event. However, Brown lost 3–4 in his held-over qualifying match against Mitchell Mann. Joe Perry defeated Judd Trump 9–5 in the final to capture his first Welsh Open title and the second ranking title of his career. Aged 47 years and 205 days, Perry became the oldest player to win a ranking tournament since Ray Reardon, who was 50 years and 14 days old when he won the 1982 Professional Players Tournament. However, Mark Williams surpassed Perry the following season by winning the 2023 British Open aged 48 years and 194 days. There were 52 century breaks made during the main venue stage of the event; the highest was a 142, made by Michael White in the second round.

== Format ==
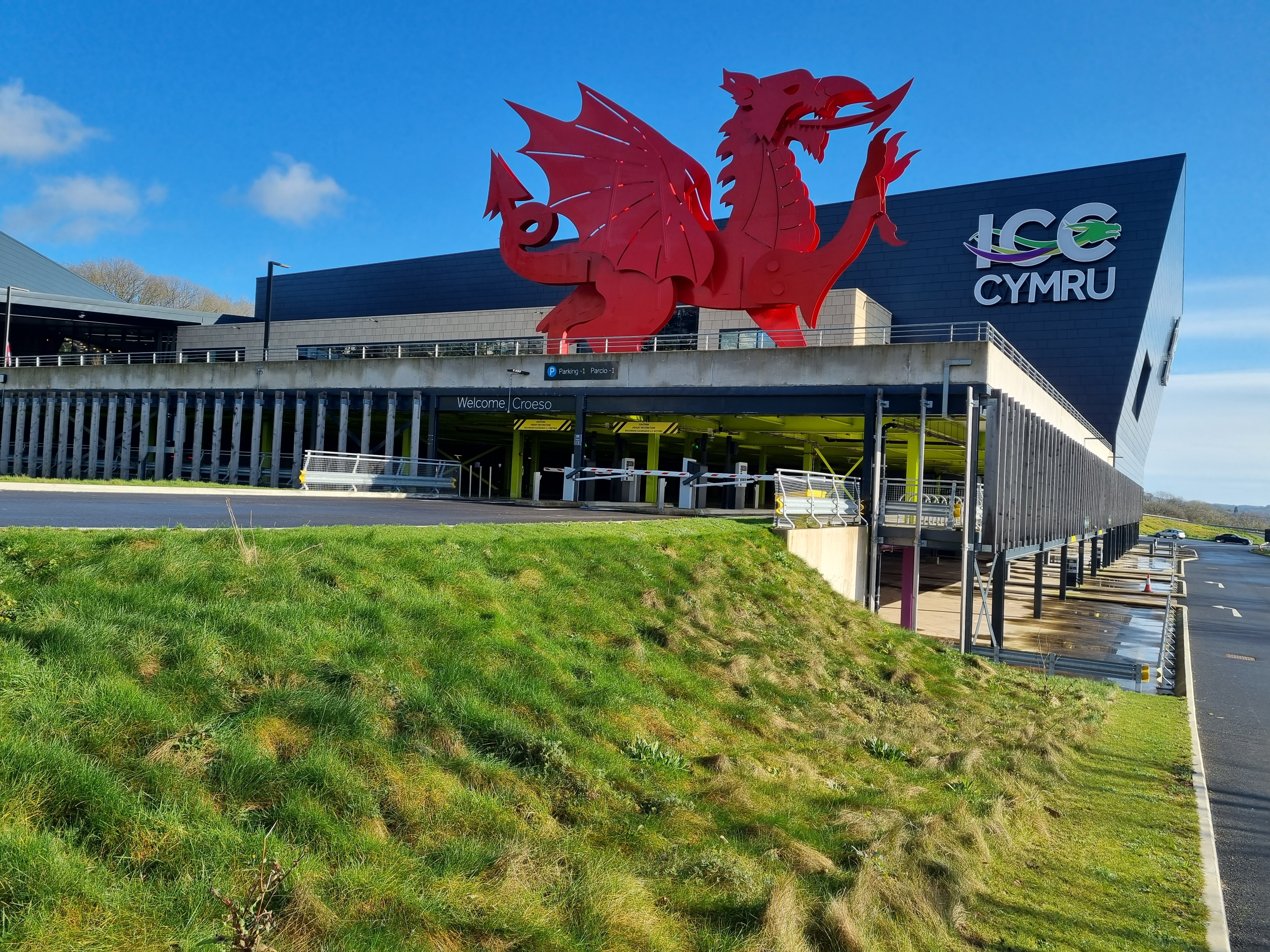

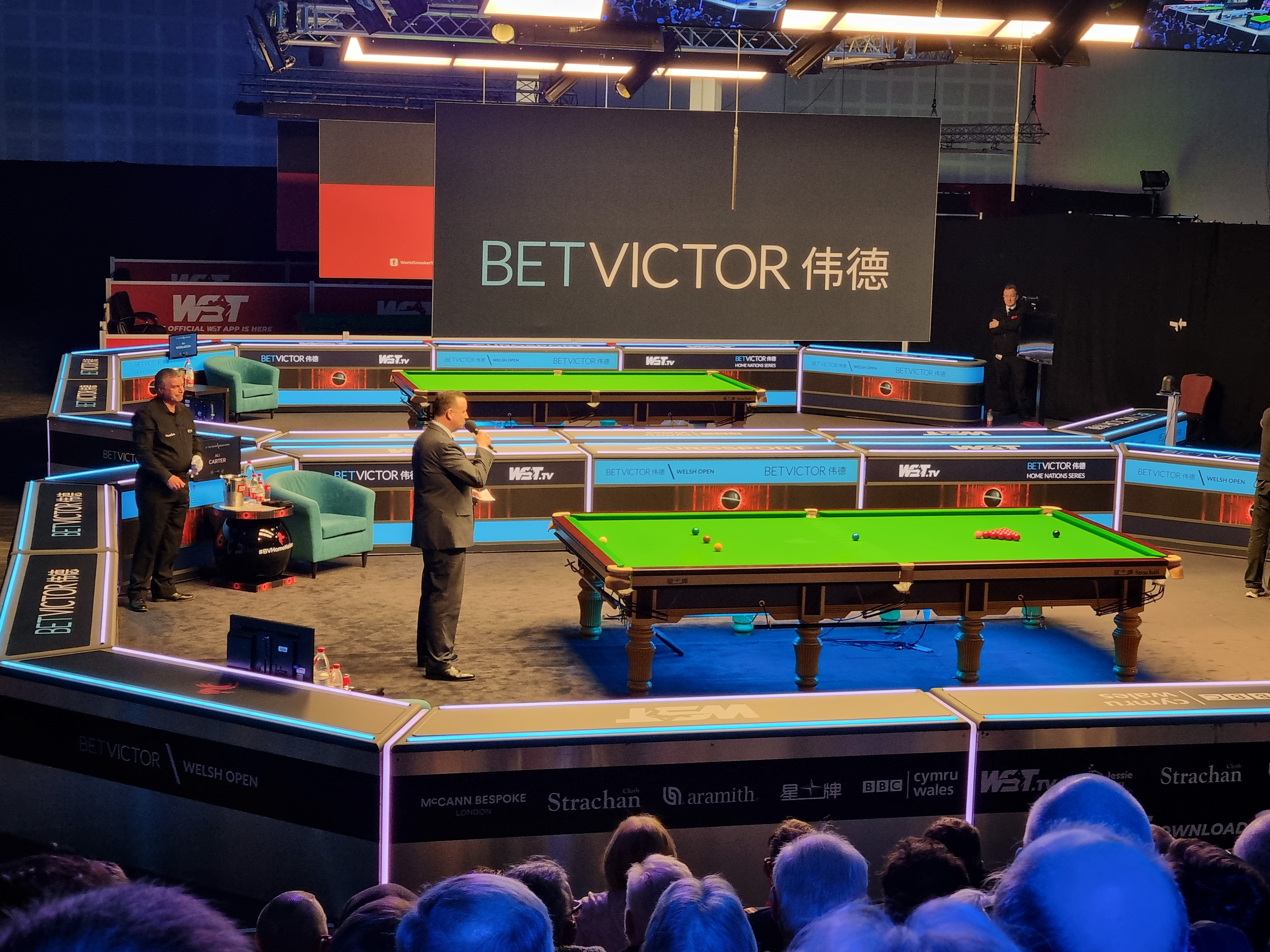
The event took place in the International Convention Centre Wales (pictured outside and inside during the event) in Newport, Wales for the first time.

The Welsh Open began as a ranking tournament in 1992, when it was held at the Newport Centre in Newport. The 2022 tournament, the 31st edition, took place at the International Convention Centre Wales at the Celtic Manor Resort in Newport, Wales, between 28 February and 6 March. Organised by the World Snooker Tour, it was the 12th ranking tournament of the 2021–22 snooker season, following the European Masters and preceding the Turkish Masters. It was the seventh of eight events in the European Series and the fourth and final event of the Home Nations Series.

The defending Welsh Open champion was Jordan Brown, who won the 2021 final with a 9–8 victory over Ronnie O'Sullivan. For the 2022 event, all matches were the best of seven frames until the quarter-finals, which were the best of nine; the semi-finals were the best of 11. The final was played over two sessions, as the best of 17 frames. The event was sponsored by sports betting company BetVictor, and broadcast locally by BBC Cymru Wales. It was broadcast by BBC Online, BBC Red Button, and Quest in the United Kingdom; Eurosport in Europe; CCTV5, Youku, Zhibo.tv and Migu in China; Now TV in Hong Kong; True Sport in Thailand; Sky Sports in New Zealand; DAZN in Canada; and Astrosport in Malaysia. In all other locations it was broadcast by Matchroom Sport.

=== Prize fund ===
The event's total prize fund was £405,000, with the winner receiving £70,000. The player accumulating the highest amount of prize money over the eight European Series events received a bonus of £150,000. The breakdown of prize money is shown below:

- Winner: £70,000
- Runner-up: £30,000
- Semi-final: £20,000
- Quarter-final: £10,000
- Last 16: £7,500
- Last 32: £4,000
- Last 64: £3,000
- Highest break: £5,000
- Total: £405,000

== Summary ==
=== Early rounds ===
"Held-over" qualifying matches (matches played at the main venue, rather than a qualifying arena) and rounds of 64 and 32 were played from 28 February to 3 March. The defending champion Brown's best performance during the 2021–22 season had been a last-16 appearance in the 2021 UK Championship. He took a 2–1 lead in his held-over qualifying match against Mitchell Mann, helped by a break of 124 in the third frame, and went on to lead 3–2. However, Mann won the last two frames to defeat Brown 4–3. Anthony McGill, the 16th seed, lost his held-over qualifying match 3–4 to Zhang Anda, while 13th seed Stephen Maguire, who had yet to win a match in 2022, lost 1–4 to Fergal O'Brien. O'Sullivan's held-over qualifying match against James Cahill was rescheduled from 28 February to 1 March, due to O'Sullivan's involvement in the European Masters final on 27 February. O'Sullivan won the match against Cahill 4–0 in 43 minutes.

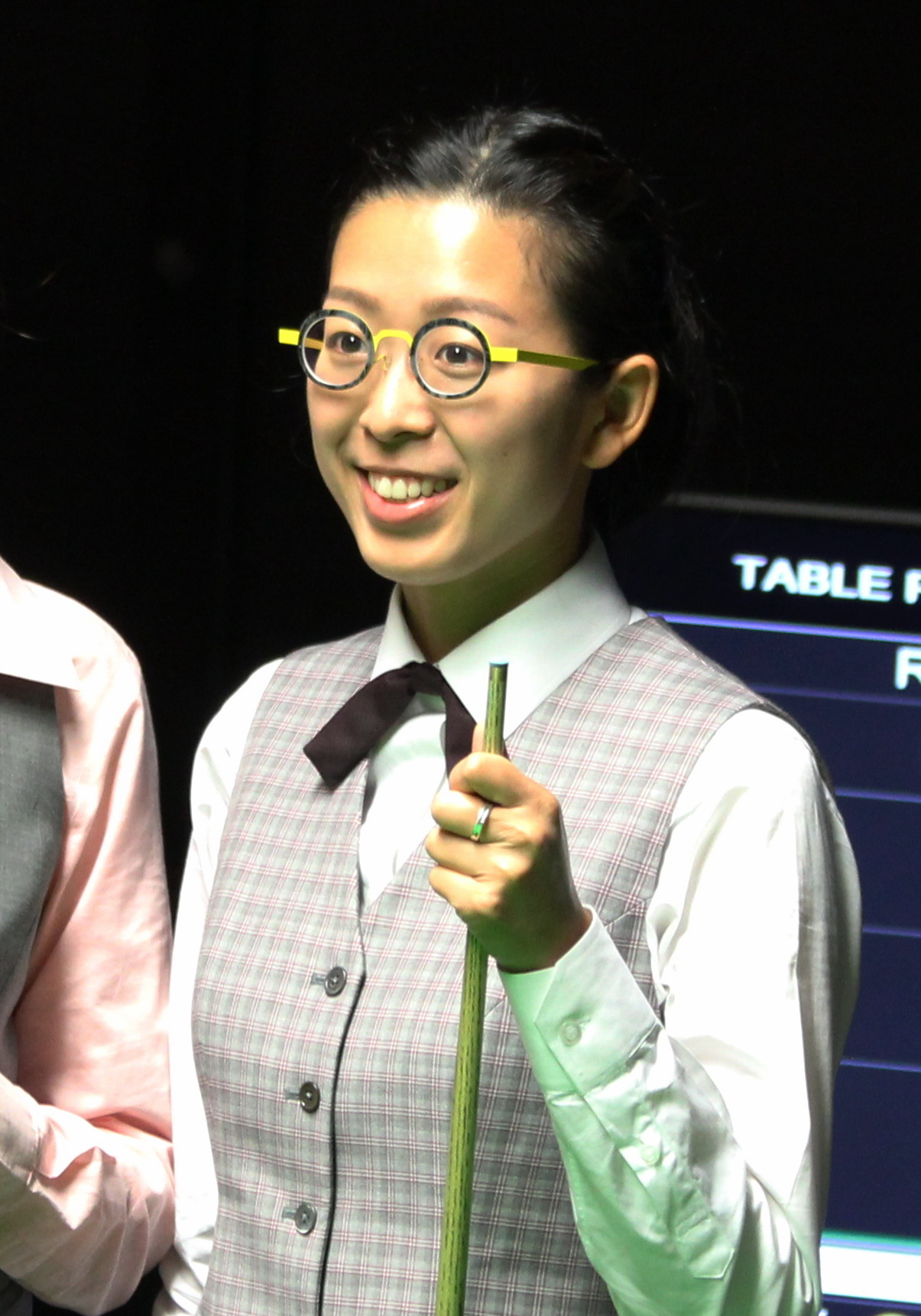
Ng On-yee became the first woman to compete in the Welsh Open beyond the qualifying stages.

Three-time World Women's Snooker Championship winner Ng On-yee had defeated Wu Yize 4–2 in the qualifying round, her first professional victory since gaining a place on the World Snooker Tour at the beginning of the season. She lost 1–4 to Ali Carter in the last 64, but was the first woman to compete in the Welsh Open beyond the qualifying stages, and posted on social media that she was "pleased and proud" of her performance. Ninth seed Zhao Xintong, 10th seed Mark Williams, and 15th seed Stuart Bingham also exited in the round of 64, all losing in deciding frames to Jak Jones, Kurt Maflin, and Elliot Slessor respectively.

O'Sullivan fell 1–2 behind against Lukas Kleckers, but then rallied to win three frames in a row, defeating Kleckers 4–2. In the final match of the round of 64, reigning world champion and second seed Mark Selby faced Liam Highfield. After losing the first two frames, Selby won three in a row before Highfield took the match to a decider with a 74 break. Selby led in the decider after a break of 40, but then failed to escape from a snooker and left a free ball, allowing Highfield to make a 92 clearance and win 4–3.

In the round of 32, Carter made breaks of 141, 50, 51, 87 and 81 in his 4–2 defeat of seventh seed John Higgins, who had reached every other Home Nations final that season. Fifth seed Neil Robertson won his first frame against Graeme Dott after the referee Andy Yates failed to notice that he had played a foul shot while bridging over the pack with the swan rest; Robertson himself was at the other end of the table and unable to see the shot. Robertson then made breaks of 102, 75, and 52 to complete a 4–1 victory. Fourth seed Judd Trump defeated Si Jiahui 4–2 after coming from behind to win both the fifth and sixth frames. Eleventh seed Mark Allen exited the tournament when he lost a late-night deciding frame to Joe Perry.

Ding Junhui won the first frame of his last-32 match against O'Sullivan with a 72 break. O'Sullivan responded with an 85 break to take the second, but Ding won the third with breaks of 65 and 59. O'Sullivan came from behind in the fourth to produce a frame-winning clearance, won the fifth after potting a difficult yellow ball, and won the match 4–2 after Ding missed a pot on the black ball in the sixth frame. It was O'Sullivan's 19th win against Ding in their 23 meetings. Ricky Walden defeated 14th seed Yan Bingtao 4–2 to set up a last-16 meeting with O'Sullivan, while Ryan Day made breaks of 71, 78, 53, and 82 on his way to a 4–0 whitewash over eighth seed Shaun Murphy. Matthew Selt took a 3–1 lead against sixth seed Kyren Wilson, but Wilson won the last three frames, defeating Selt 4–3. Twelfth seed Barry Hawkins lost in a deciding frame to Ben Woollaston.

=== Last 16 ===
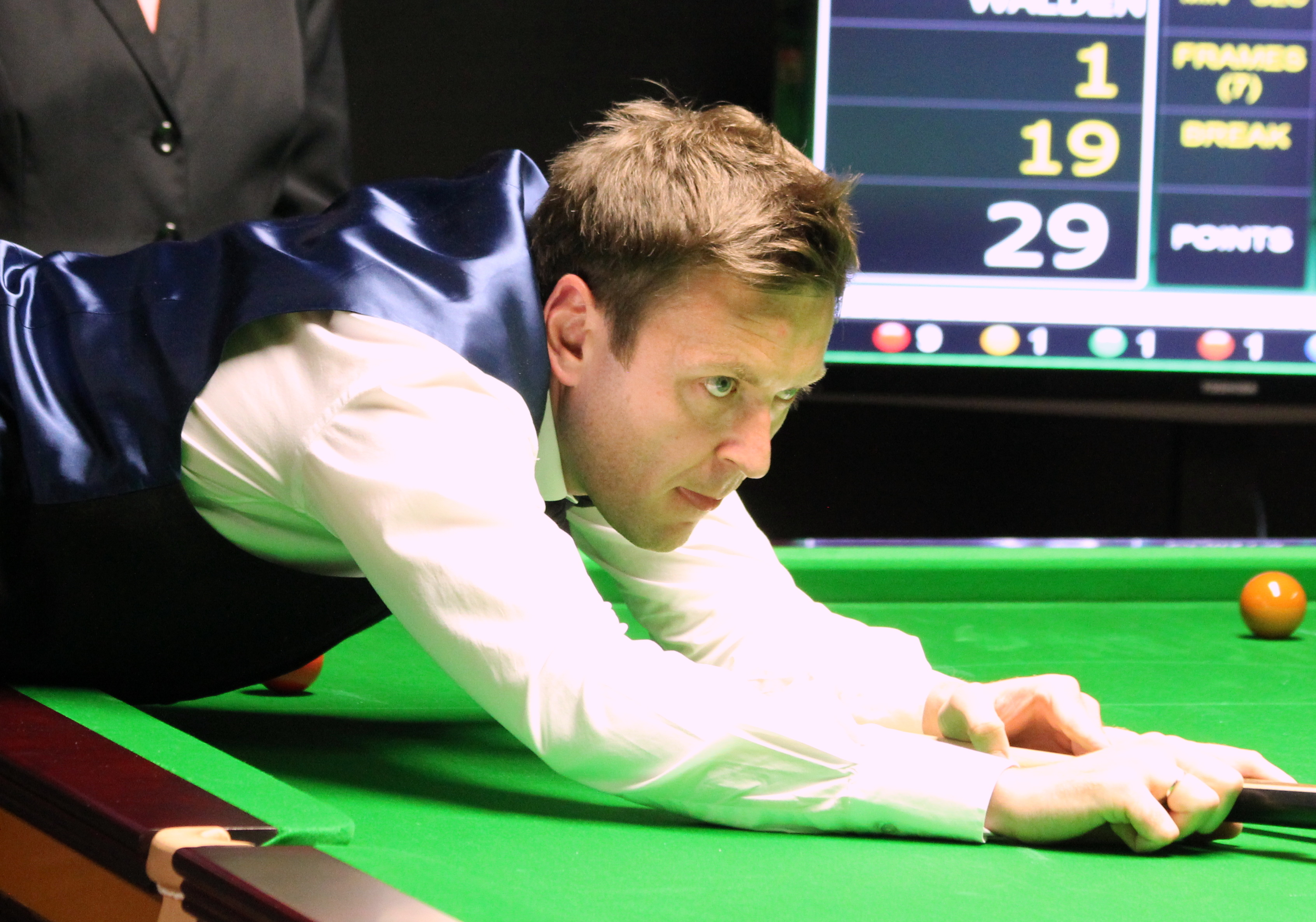
Ricky Walden defeated four-time Welsh Open champion Ronnie O'Sullivan in the last 16.

All last-16 matches took place on the evening of 3 March. Trump capitalised on errors from his opponent Jimmy Robertson to win the first two frames, making a century break in the second. Robertson won the third frame and had an opportunity to win the fourth by potting a straightforward pink ball, but missed the shot, allowing Trump to go 3–1 ahead. Trump closed out the match with his second century of the evening to win 4–1, the ninth time he had beaten Jimmy Robertson in ten encounters.

O'Sullivan lost the first frame against Walden, but won the second with a break of 76. Although O'Sullivan made a 55 break in the third frame, Walden won it by clearing to the black, and then made a total clearance of 136 in the fourth frame to go 3–1 ahead. Walden played more conservatively in the fifth frame, but O'Sullivan won the fifth and sixth frames with breaks of 88 and 85 to take the match to a deciding frame. However, Walden made an 83 break to win 4–3.

Carter won four frames in a row to defeat Scott Donaldson 4–2, Zhang beat Matthew Stevens by the same scoreline, and Hossein Vafaei defeated Day in a deciding frame. Perry defeated Wilson 4–1, Neil Robertson beat Woollaston by the same scoreline, and Jack Lisowski whitewashed amateur player Michael White 4–0. The losses by Stevens, Day, and White meant that no Welsh player advanced beyond the round of 16.

=== Quarter-finals ===
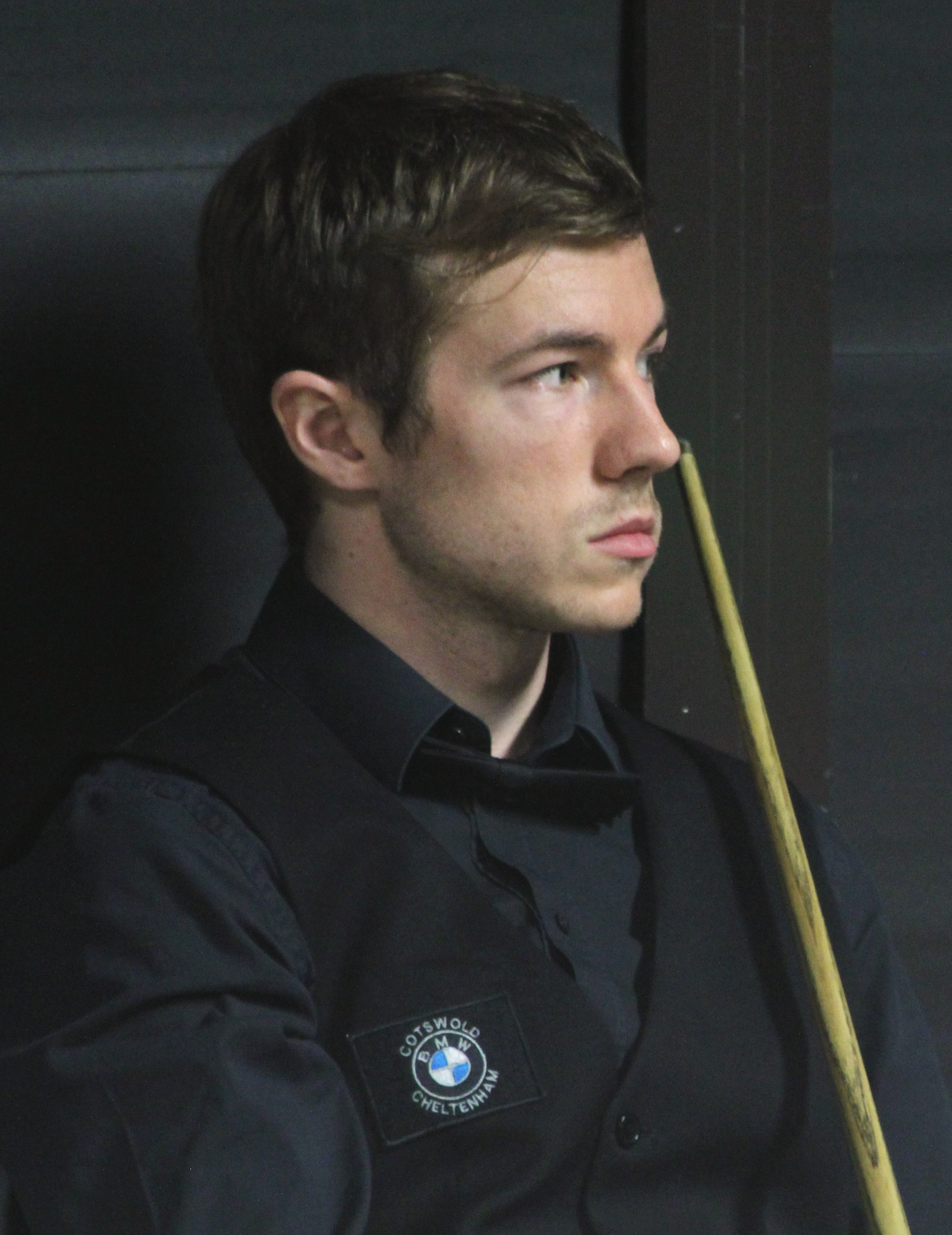
Jack Lisowski called his comeback to defeat Ali Carter in the quarter-finals "one of my biggest buzzes since I've been a pro".

The quarter-finals were played on 4 March as the best of nine frames. In the afternoon session, Carter played Lisowski while Neil Robertson faced Trump. The first four frames between Carter and Lisowski were shared, but Carter won the fifth and sixth frames with breaks of 86 and 53 to lead 4–2. However, Carter did not score another point in the match. Lisowski won a scrappy seventh frame before making an 82 break in the eighth and a total clearance of 135 in the decider to win the match 5–4 and reach his first ranking event semi-final of the season. "It was probably one of my biggest buzzes since I’ve been a pro. Everything started going in, I can't even remember the break at the end," said Lisowski afterward. O'Sullivan, working as a pundit for Eurosport, stated that Lisowski would win tournaments if he played similarly more often.

Trump won a scrappy 25-minute opening frame against Robertson, but a lax safety shot from Trump in the second gave Robertson an opportunity to draw level with a 95 break. Robertson required foul shots from his opponent in the third frame, but Trump repeatedly escaped each time Robertson laid a snooker and eventually snookered Robertson back; Robertson conceded the frame after he failed to escape. Trump won the fourth frame with a break of 60 and won the fifth frame to lead 4–1. Robertson, however, won both the sixth and seventh frames and had an opportunity to draw level in the eighth, but missed an easy black, allowing Trump to win the match 5–3 and reach his first ranking semi-final of the season. Robertson stated afterward that the sudden death of Australian cricket player Shane Warne, a childhood idol, had left him in tears before the match and had affected his performance on the table: "I couldn't concentrate, couldn't think properly, couldn't do anything."

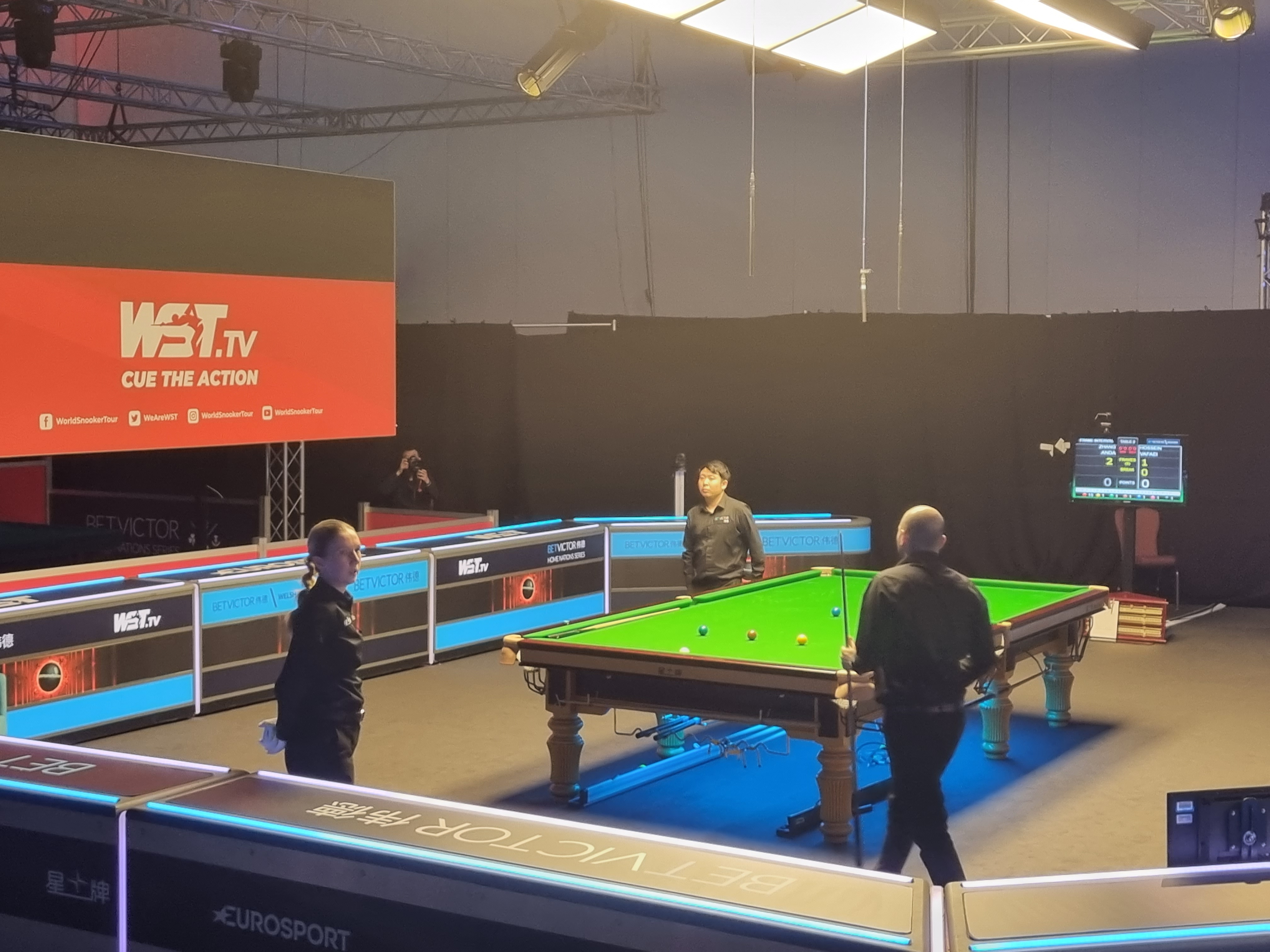
Zhang Anda and his opponent Hossein Vafaei in the quarter-finals

In the evening, Zhang faced Vafaei and Walden played Perry. Zhang made a century break in the opening frame and won three of the next four frames to lead 4–1. Vafaei, however, won four frames in a row with breaks of 68, 58, 63 and 96 to win the match 5–4 and reach the fifth ranking semi-final of his career. "It was unbelievable. This is one of the tastiest comebacks I’ve ever had in my life," stated Vafaei afterward. He added that winning the Shoot Out earlier in the season had given him the self-belief that he could win. Walden made two breaks of 125, but only won two frames as Perry won the match 5–2 with breaks including a 118 and a 51 to reach his first ranking semi-final since 2019. Perry cited a match he won over Lee Walker at the Turkish Masters qualifying event where he had played well as a catalyst for his change in form and increase in confidence.

=== Semi-finals ===
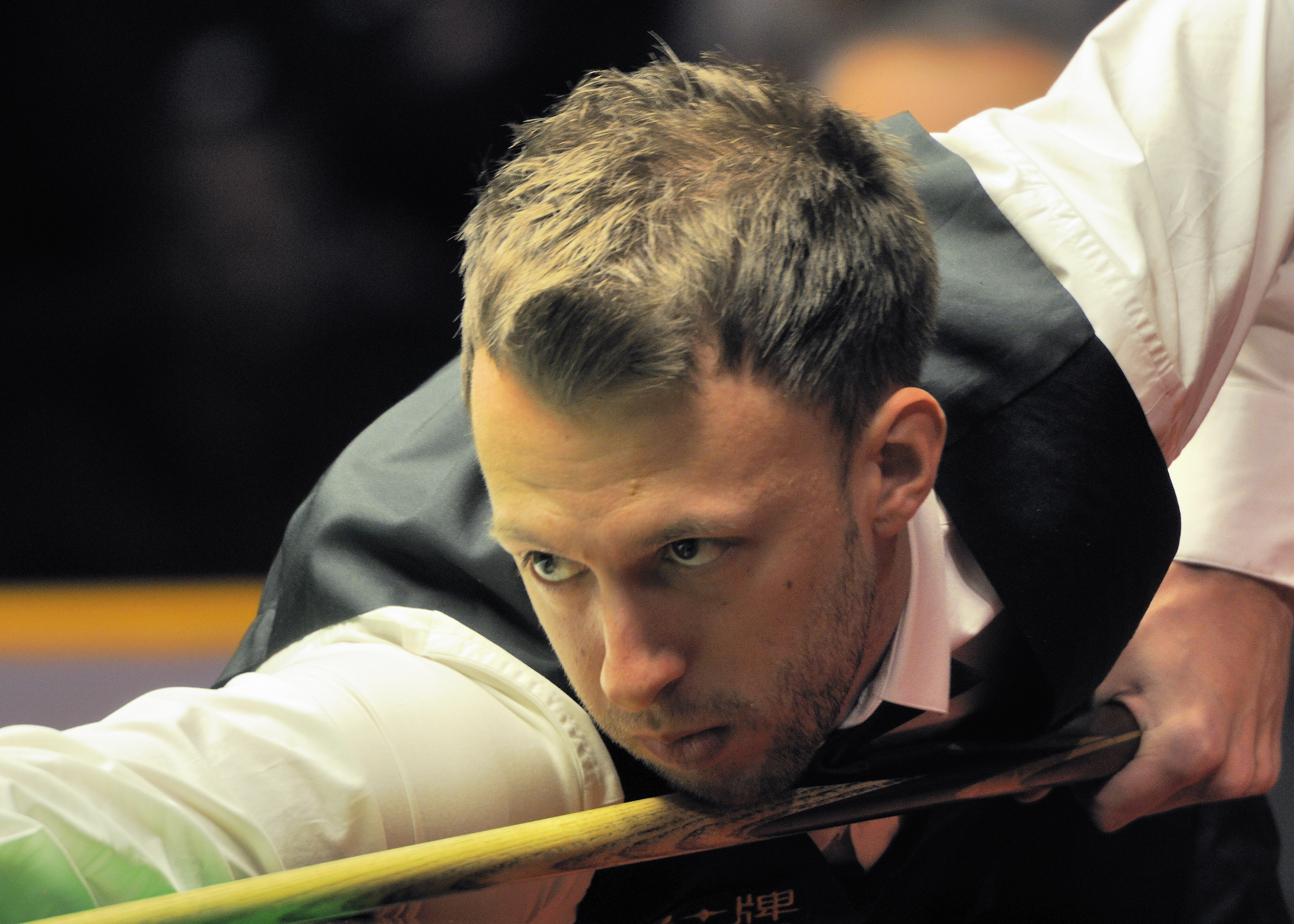
Judd Trump played in his first ranking semi-final and final of the 2021–22 season.

The semi-finals were played on 5 March as the best of 11 frames. Facing Trump in the afternoon session, Vafaei started strongly, taking a 3–1 lead with breaks of 94 and 85, but Trump claimed the fifth and then won the sixth on the black to draw level at 3–3. Vafaei moved two frames ahead again at 5–3, but Trump made breaks of 66 and 121 to force a deciding frame, which he won to defeat Vafaei 6–5. Trump said that Vafaei would be "disappointed", that "he was the better player and his safety was brilliant. Every time I came to the table I seemed to be in trouble and his potting was better than mine."

The second semi-final between Perry and Lisowski also went to a deciding frame. Perry won the first three frames and came close to winning the fourth, but he missed a straightforward pot, which let Lisowski win the frame and go to the interval trailing 1–3. Lisowski's attempt at a maximum break in the fifth frame ended when he missed the ninth red after potting eight reds and eight blacks, but he won the frame, reducing Perry's lead to one. Good safety play and a break of 68 gave Perry the sixth frame, Lisowski responded with a 69 to win the seventh, and Perry won the eighth to move one frame from victory at 5–3. However, Lisowski took the ninth with a 71 break after Perry missed a black off the spot, and then made a 123 break in the tenth to take the match to a decider. Both players had opportunities, but Perry prevailed in a key safety exchange to win the frame and match. It was Perry's 16th win in a final-frame decider at the Welsh Open, more than any other player in the history of the event. Perry stated afterward that he had been suffering from a bad headache during the match that at one point made it difficult to see the balls clearly, calling it "the worst I've ever felt in a game of snooker."

=== Final ===
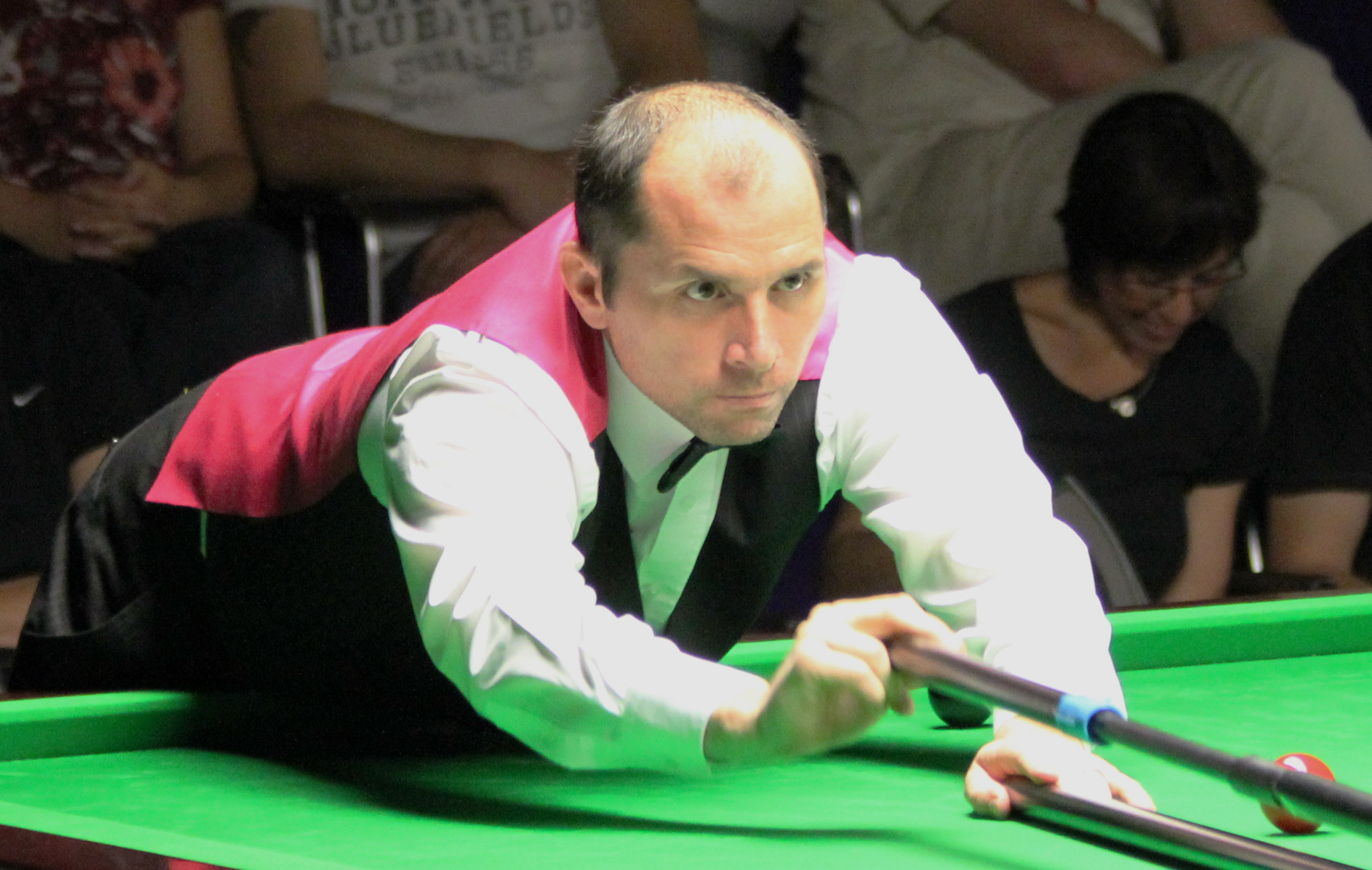
Joe Perry won the event aged 47, becoming the oldest player to capture a ranking title since Ray Reardon in 1982.

Trump and Perry contested the final on 6 March as a best-of-17-frame match, held over two sessions. It was the sixth ranking final of Perry's professional career, and his first appearance in a ranking final since 2018. It was Trump's 34th ranking final, but his first of the 2021–22 season. Perry appeared in his first Welsh Open final, while Trump had previously been runner-up in 2017 when he lost the final 8–9 to Bingham. Prior to the final, Trump had beaten Perry 9 times in their 12 encounters.

Trump made a break of 60 in the opener, but Perry recovered to contest the frame on the final black. After Trump played a safety shot that left the black on the baulk cushion, Perry won the frame with a long double into the bottom right corner pocket. Trump took the second with a break of 45. Perry won the third with a 59, but missed a red with the rest in the fourth, allowing Trump to tie the scores at 2–2 at the midsession interval. Trump won the fifth frame after Perry missed a straightforward blue, but Perry won the next frame. After Perry missed a black in the seventh, Trump won it with a 73 break, his highest of the match. Perry won a scrappy eighth frame after Trump missed a close-range shot on a straight pink, tying the scores at 4–4 after the afternoon session.

In the ninth frame, the first of the evening session, Perry made a 108 break, the only century of the final. Trump won a 28-minute 10th frame to level at 5–5, but Perry made two half-centuries in the 11th and then a 68 in the 12th to open up a two-frame lead at the midsession interval. Trump took the lead in the 13th frame but played a lax safety shot, giving Perry the opportunity to clear the table and win the frame. Perry went on to make a break of 70 in the 14th, forcing Trump to lay snookers, but he was unable to obtain any foul points. Perry won the final 9–5, capturing his first Welsh Open title and second-ranking title. He called the win "the absolute highlight of my career by a country mile", while Trump said that Perry was "the best player over the week and thoroughly deserved to win". Aged 47 years and 205 days, Perry became the second-oldest player in professional snooker history to win a ranking title, behind Ray Reardon, who won the 1982 Professional Players Tournament aged 50 years and 14 days. Perry's achievement was surpassed the following season by Williams, who won the 2023 British Open aged 48 years and 194 days, making Perry the third-oldest ranking event winner. The win took Perry from 42nd to 23rd in the world rankings.

== Main draw ==
Below is the main draw for the event. Numbers in brackets denote seeded players. Players in bold denote match winners.

=== Top half ===
**Last 64**; Best of 7 frames
**Mitchell Mann (ENG)**	**4**
Ben Hancorn (ENG)	1
Lu Ning (CHN) (32)	2
**Matthew Stevens (WAL)**	**4**
**Zhang Anda (CHN)**	**4**
Mark Joyce (ENG)	2
Rory McLeod (JAM)	3
**Yuan Sijun (CHN)**	**4**
Robbie Williams (ENG)	3
**Hossein Vafaei (IRN) (24)**	**4**
**Jak Jones (WAL)**	**4**
Zhao Xintong (CHN) (9)	3
Zak Surety (ENG)	1
**Ryan Day (WAL) (25)**	**4**
Anthony Hamilton (ENG)	1
**Shaun Murphy (ENG) (8)**	**4**
**Neil Robertson (AUS) (5)**	**4**
Hammad Miah (ENG)	1
**Graeme Dott (SCO) (28)**	**4**
Jamie Clarke (WAL)	1
**Barry Hawkins (ENG) (12)**	**4**
Ashley Carty (ENG)	1
**Ben Woollaston (ENG)**	**4**
Liang Wenbo (CHN)	3
**Jimmy Robertson (ENG)**	**4**
Jamie Jones (WAL)	3
Thepchaiya Un-Nooh (THA)	3
**Fergal O'Brien (IRL)**	**4**
**Si Jiahui (CHN)**	**4**
Gary Wilson (ENG) (29)	3
Craig Steadman (ENG)	1
**Judd Trump (ENG) (4)**	**4**

**Last 32**; Best of 7 frames
(England) Mitchell Mann	0
**(Wales) Matthew Stevens**	**4**
**(China) Zhang Anda**	**4**
(China) Yuan Sijun	2
**(Iran) Hossein Vafaei (24)**	**4**
(Wales) Jak Jones	0
**(Wales) Ryan Day (25)**	**4**
(England) Shaun Murphy (8)	0
**(Australia) Neil Robertson (5)**	**4**
(Scotland) Graeme Dott (28)	1
(England) Barry Hawkins (12)	3
**(England) Ben Woollaston**	**4**
**(England) Jimmy Robertson**	**4**
(Republic of Ireland) Fergal O'Brien	2
(China) Si Jiahui	2
**(England) Judd Trump (4)**	**4**

**Last 16**; Best of 7 frames
(Wales) Matthew Stevens	2
**(China) Zhang Anda**	**4**
**(Iran) Hossein Vafaei (24)**	**4**
(Wales) Ryan Day (25)	3
**(Australia) Neil Robertson (5)**	**4**
(England) Ben Woollaston	1
(England) Jimmy Robertson	1
**(England) Judd Trump (4)**	**4**

**Quarter-finals**; Best of 9 frames
(China) Zhang Anda	4
**(Iran) Hossein Vafaei (24)**	**5**
(Australia) Neil Robertson (5)	3
**(England) Judd Trump (4)**	**5**

**Semi-finals**; Best of 11 frames
(Iran) Hossein Vafaei (24)	5
**(England) Judd Trump (4)**	**6**

=== Bottom half ===
**Last 64**; Best of 7 frames
**Ronnie O'Sullivan (ENG) (3)**	**4**
Lukas Kleckers (GER)	2
**Ding Junhui (CHN) (30)**	**4**
Michael Holt (ENG)	1
**Yan Bingtao (CHN) (14)**	**4**
Zhao Jianbo (CHN)	0
**Ricky Walden (ENG) (19)**	**4**
Noppon Saengkham (THA)	1
Cao Yupeng (CHN)	3
**Joe Perry (ENG)**	**4**
Iulian Boiko (UKR)	0
**Mark Allen (NIR) (11)**	**4**
Mark Davis (ENG)	1
**Matthew Selt (ENG) (27)**	**4**
Li Hang (CHN)	0
**Kyren Wilson (ENG) (6)**	**4**
**John Higgins (SCO) (7)**	**4**
Soheil Vahedi (IRN)	0
**Ali Carter (ENG) (26)**	**4**
Ng On-yee (HKG)	1
Mark Williams (WAL) (10)	3
**Kurt Maflin (NOR)**	**4**
**Scott Donaldson (SCO)**	**4**
Andrew Pagett (WAL)	0
Chris Wakelin (ENG)	2
**Jack Lisowski (ENG) (18)**	**4**
**Elliot Slessor (ENG)**	**4**
Stuart Bingham (ENG) (15)	3
Allan Taylor (ENG)	3
**Michael White (WAL)**	**4**
**Liam Highfield (ENG)**	**4**
Mark Selby (ENG) (2)	3

**Last 32**; Best of 7 frames
**(England) Ronnie O'Sullivan (3)**	**4**
(China) Ding Junhui (30)	2
(China) Yan Bingtao (14)	2
**(England) Ricky Walden (19)**	**4**
**(England) Joe Perry**	**4**
(Northern Ireland) Mark Allen (11)	3
(England) Matthew Selt (27)	3
**(England) Kyren Wilson (6)**	**4**
(Scotland) John Higgins (7)	2
**(England) Ali Carter (26)**	**4**
(Norway) Kurt Maflin	1
**(Scotland) Scott Donaldson**	**4**
**(England) Jack Lisowski (18)**	**4**
(England) Elliot Slessor	2
**(Wales) Michael White**	**4**
(England) Liam Highfield	1

**Last 16**; Best of 7 frames
(England) Ronnie O'Sullivan (3)	3
**(England) Ricky Walden (19)**	**4**
**(England) Joe Perry**	**4**
(England) Kyren Wilson (6)	1
**(England) Ali Carter (26)**	**4**
(Scotland) Scott Donaldson	2
**(England) Jack Lisowski (18)**	**4**
(Wales) Michael White	0

**Quarter-finals**; Best of 9 frames
(England) Ricky Walden (19)	2
**(England) Joe Perry**	**5**
(England) Ali Carter (26)	4
**(England) Jack Lisowski (18)**	**5**

**Semi-finals**; Best of 11 frames
**(England) Joe Perry**	**6**
(England) Jack Lisowski (18)	5

=== Final ===
Final: Best of 17 frames. Referee: Tatiana Woollaston; ICC Wales, Celtic Manor Resort, Newport, Wales, 6 March 2022
Judd Trump (4); England	5–**9**	**Joe Perry**; England
Afternoon: 67–**70**, **64**–0, 0–**73**, **95**–32, **67**–32, 30–**51**, **73**–30, 56–**62**; Evening: 0–**108** (108), **75**–47, 17–**117**, 32–**77**, 44–**62**, 39–**82**
73	Highest break	**108**
0	Century breaks	**1**

== Qualifying ==
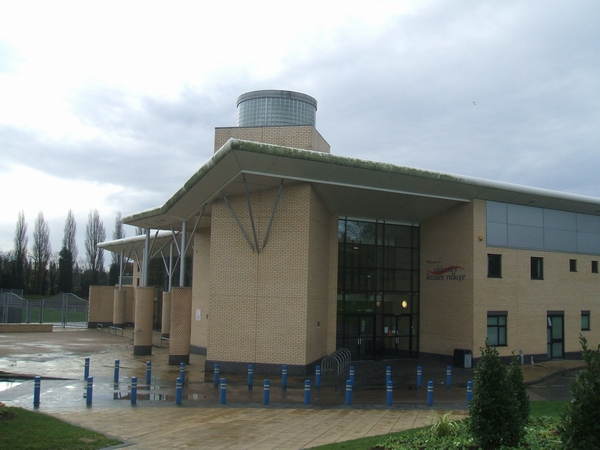
Qualifying took place at the Aldersley Leisure Village (pictured) in Wolverhampton.

Qualification for the tournament took place from 15 to 20 February 2022 at Aldersley Leisure Village in Wolverhampton. The matches involving the top 16 seeds and the two wild card players, Dylan Emery and Liam Davies, were held over and played at the main venue. Sam Craigie withdrew and was replaced by James Cahill. Numbers in brackets denote seeded players.

- Jordan Brown (NIR) (1) 3–4 Mitchell Mann (ENG) (Note: Match held over and played in Newport.)
- David Lilley (ENG) 1–4 Ben Hancorn (ENG)
- Lu Ning (CHN) 4–2 Lee Walker (WAL)
- Joe O'Connor (ENG) 1–4 Matthew Stevens (WAL)
- Anthony McGill (SCO) 3–4 Zhang Anda (CHN)
- Mark Joyce (ENG) 4–1 Jackson Page (WAL)
- Luca Brecel (BEL) 2–4 Rory McLeod (JAM)
- Fraser Patrick (SCO) 0–4 Yuan Sijun (CHN)
- Robbie Williams (ENG) 4–0 Sanderson Lam (ENG)
- Hossein Vafaei (IRN) 4–3 Andrew Higginson (ENG)
- Jak Jones (WAL) 4–1 Sunny Akani (THA)
- Zhao Xintong (CHN) (9) 4–1 Oliver Lines (ENG)
- Zak Surety (ENG) 4–2 Barry Pinches (ENG)
- Ryan Day (WAL) 4–2 Chang Bingyu (CHN)
- Lyu Haotian (CHN) 3–4 Anthony Hamilton (ENG)
- Shaun Murphy (ENG) (8) 4–2 Andy Hicks (ENG)
- Neil Robertson (AUS) (5) 4–0 Jimmy White (ENG)
- Ross Muir (SCO) 2–4 Hammad Miah (ENG)
- Graeme Dott (SCO) 4–3 Steven Hallworth (ENG)
- Jamie Clarke (WAL) 4–2 Farakh Ajaib (PAK)
- Barry Hawkins (ENG) 4–0 Alexander Ursenbacher (SUI)
- Ashley Carty (ENG) 4–1 Duane Jones (WAL)
- Martin Gould (ENG) 2–4 Ben Woollaston (ENG)
- Liang Wenbo (CHN) 4–0 Zhang Jiankang (CHN)
- Jimmy Robertson (ENG) 4–3 Peter Devlin (ENG)
- Zhou Yuelong (CHN) 3–4 Jamie Jones (WAL)
- Thepchaiya Un-Nooh (THA) 4–2 Robert Milkins (ENG)
- Stephen Maguire (SCO) 1–4 Fergal O'Brien (IRL)
- Nigel Bond (ENG) 3–4 Si Jiahui (CHN)
- Gary Wilson (ENG) 4–3 Peter Lines (ENG)
- Craig Steadman (ENG) 4–1 Ian Burns (ENG)
- Judd Trump (ENG) (4) 4–1 Dean Young (SCO)
- Ronnie O'Sullivan (ENG) (3) 4–0 James Cahill (ENG)
- Michael Georgiou (CYP) 3–4 Lukas Kleckers (GER)
- Ding Junhui (CHN) 4–0 Gao Yang (CHN)
- Michael Holt (ENG) 4–1 Martin O'Donnell (ENG)
- Yan Bingtao (CHN) 4–3 Ashley Hugill (ENG)
- David Grace (ENG) 3–4 Zhao Jianbo (CHN)
- Ricky Walden (ENG) 4–1 Gerard Greene (NIR)
- Tian Pengfei (CHN) 2–4 Noppon Saengkham (THA)
- Cao Yupeng (CHN) 4–3 Fan Zhengyi (CHN)
- David Gilbert (ENG) 2–4 Joe Perry (ENG)
- Liam Davies (WAL) 3–4 Iulian Boiko (UKR)
- Mark Allen (NIR) 4–1 Ken Doherty (IRL)
- Alfie Burden (ENG) 3–4 Mark Davis (ENG)
- Matthew Selt (ENG) 4–3 Xu Si (CHN)
- Louis Heathcote (ENG) 1–4 Li Hang (CHN)
- Kyren Wilson (ENG) (6) 4–3 Dominic Dale (WAL)
- John Higgins (SCO) (7) 4–1 Pang Junxu (CHN)
- Reanne Evans (ENG) 1–4 Soheil Vahedi (IRN)
- Ali Carter (ENG) 4–2 Lei Peifan (CHN)
- Wu Yize (CHN) 2–4 Ng On-yee (HKG)
- Mark Williams (WAL) 4–1 Michael Judge (IRL)
- Jamie Wilson (ENG) 2–4 Kurt Maflin (NOR)
- Tom Ford (ENG) 3–4 Scott Donaldson (SCO)
- Simon Lichtenberg (GER) 0–4 Andrew Pagett (WAL)
- Chris Wakelin (ENG) 4–0 Aaron Hill (IRL)
- Jack Lisowski (ENG) 4–2 Stuart Carrington (ENG)
- Elliot Slessor (ENG) 4–3 Dylan Emery (WAL)
- Stuart Bingham (ENG) 4–1 Sean Maddocks (ENG)
- Allan Taylor (ENG) 4–1 Jamie O'Neill (ENG)
- Xiao Guodong (CHN) (Note: Xiao Guodong was docked two frames for a late arrival. As a result, only 2 frames were played.) 0–4 Michael White (WAL)
- Mark King (ENG) 3–4 Liam Highfield (ENG)
- Mark Selby (ENG) (2) 4–1 Chen Zifan (CHN)

== Century breaks ==
=== Main stage centuries ===
There were 58 century breaks made during the main stage of the tournament.

- 142 – Michael White
- 141, 136, 125, 125, 101 – Ricky Walden
- 141, 108 – Ali Carter
- 139, 116 – Liang Wenbo
- 138, 126, 122, 118, 109, 108 – Joe Perry
- 138, 111, 103 – Ding Junhui
- 136, 102 – Kyren Wilson
- 135, 123, 108 – Jack Lisowski
- 131 – Matthew Stevens
- 129 – Matthew Selt
- 127 – Liam Davies
- 124 – Jordan Brown
- 123, 120 – Graeme Dott
- 122 – Ashley Carty
- 121, 120, 108, 103, 100 – Judd Trump
- 121, 119, 102, 101 – Neil Robertson
- 120, 100 – Ryan Day
- 120 – Mark Allen
- 115, 101 – Zhao Xintong
- 115 – Mark Selby
- 113, 110, 102 – John Higgins
- 112 – Shaun Murphy
- 110 – Barry Hawkins
- 108, 108 – Zhang Anda
- 108 – Yuan Sijun
- 107 – Hossein Vafaei
- 101 – Scott Donaldson
- 101 – Elliot Slessor
- 100 – Dominic Dale

=== Qualifying stage centuries ===
A total of 22 century breaks were made during qualification.

- 142 – Joe Perry
- 134, 116 – Ryan Day
- 134, 105 – Liang Wenbo
- 134 – Ding Junhui
- 133 – Kurt Maflin
- 125 – Ashley Carty
- 124 – Mark Davis
- 122 – Hossein Vafaei
- 117 – Zhou Yuelong
- 114 – Ben Woollaston
- 112 – Lyu Haotian
- 112 – Thepchaiya Un-Nooh
- 109 – Mark King
- 105 – Anthony Hamilton
- 105 – Chris Wakelin
- 104 – Matthew Selt
- 104 – Soheil Vahedi
- 102 – Jack Lisowski
- 101 – Li Hang
- 101 – Ricky Walden
