= UK Space Conference =

UK Space Conference logo

The UK Space Conference is a conference devoted to space, held in the United Kingdom. The conference was founded by The British Interplanetary Society (BIS) and hosted the annual Sir Arthur Clarke Award prize-giving dinner, in association with the Arthur C. Clarke Foundation.

== History ==
The UK Space Conference evolved out of The British Interplanetary Society’s annual British Rocket Oral History Programme (BROHP) conference, which had been running since 1998. The rebranding of the conference in 2007 signalled a broadening of its remit. The 2008 UKSC event included parallel sessions on Education, Research, Engineering and Astronomy as well as History.

Until 2010, the conference was held at Charterhouse School in Surrey in March each year. Beginning in 2011, the conference was held every two years.

The 2011 event was held at the University of Warwick in Coventry on 4 and 5 July.

The 2013 conference was held at the Scottish Exhibition and Conference Centre in Glasgow on 16 and 17 July.

The 2015 event was held in Liverpool.

The 2017 conference was held at the Manchester Central Convention Complex between 30 May and 1 June. Sponsors included the UK Space Agency, ESA and DSTL.

The 2019 event took place at the Newport International Convention Centre Wales from 23-26 September 2019. Tim Peake was among the speakers.
