= Comic Con Northern Ireland =

Annual fan convention

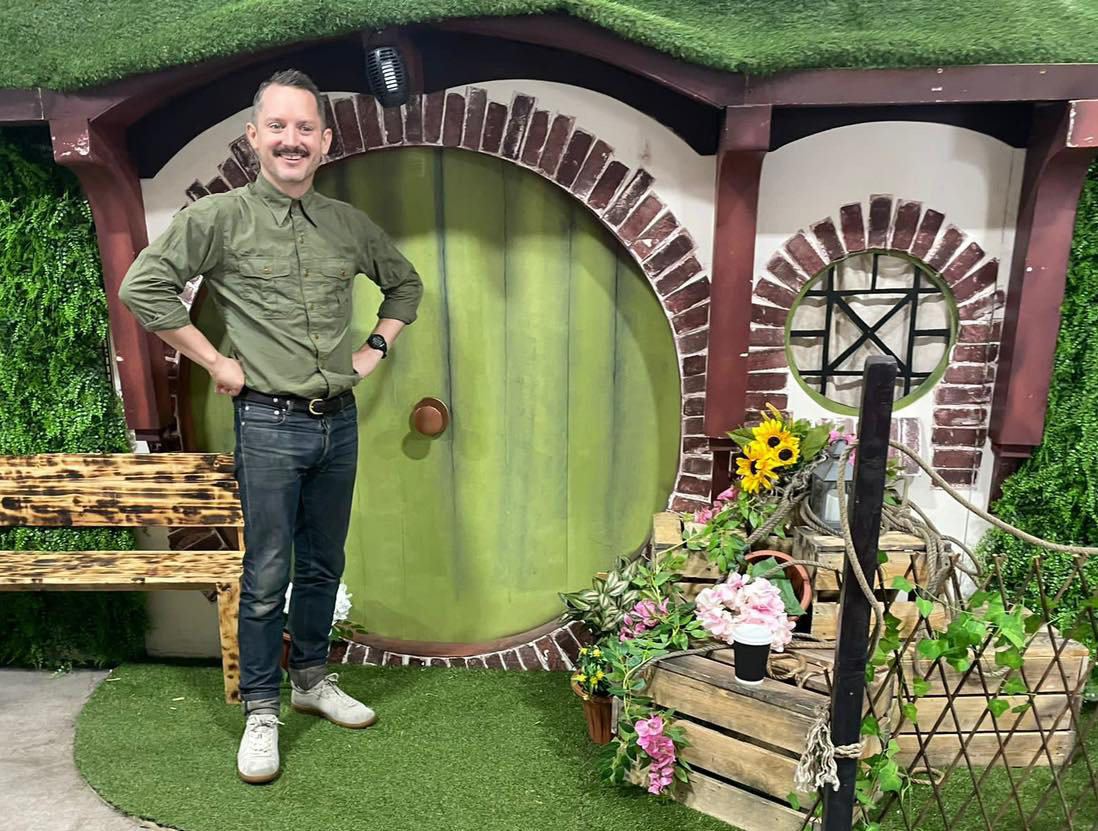
- Actor Elijah Wood stands outside a fan built replica of the Hobbit Hole from The Lord of the Rings at Comic Con Northern Ireland 2023
- Status: Active
- Genre: Multigenre, covering popular culture elements including sci-fi, horror, fantasy, mainstream, wrestling and more
- Venue: Eikon Exhibition Centre
- Locations: Lisburn, Belfast, Northern Ireland
- Inaugurated: 17–18 September 2022
- Most recent: 19–20 September 2026
- Next event: 18–19 September 2027
- Attendance: 18,000k+ (September 2025 event)
- Organiser: Monopoly Events
- Website: www.comicconnorthernireland.co.uk

Comic Con Northern Ireland is a fan convention held once a year in the city of Lisburn, near the city of Belfast, Northern Ireland in the United Kingdom attracting 18,000+ attendees across the large venue Eikon Exhibition Centre situated in Lisburn, that celebrates films, cult television, video gaming, anime, cosplay and comic books and which is organised by UK based events company Monopoly Events.

== History and organisation ==
Comic Con Northern Ireland began its annual run of events in 2022. Monopoly Events CEO Andy Kleek sourced the Eikon Exhibition Centre venue with an eye on having room for future expansion. The first event took place in September 2022 and sold over half its entry tickets more than a year before the event took place.

== Show features ==
=== Celebrity guests ===
Often guests will choose to visit famous landmarks or attractions in the hosting city, in 2023 Comic Con Northern Ireland guests Elijah Wood, Sean Astin and Bernard Hill visited the famous Titanic Belfast museum as Hill previously portrayed Captain John Smith in the 1997 film Titanic.

=== Cosplay ===
A large part of the event is devoted to the cosplay hobby where members of the public are allowed, and encouraged, to take part in dressing up as characters from popular genres such as film and television. Cosplaying has become one of the most popular parts of many fan conventions around the world and can be used as a platform to showcase the costumer's latest handywork, to show devotion to their favourite characters or engage in role-play with other cosplayers in the same series, as well as to meet new people with mutual interests as themselves.

== Location, dates and notable guests ==
Dates	Location	Notable guests
17–18 September 2022	Eikon Exhibition Centre	Candice King, Daniel Gillies, Matt Davis, Michael Trevino, Michael Malarkey, Kayla Ewell, James Marsters, Kim Coates, Mark Boone Junior, Michael Cudlitz, Chandler Riggs, Steven Ogg, Katelyn Nacon, Robin Lord Taylor, Cameron Monaghan, Sean Pertwee, Erin Richards, David Mazouz, Alec Utgoff, Ed Westwick, James Murray, Keith Gillespie, Zach Galligan, Karyn Parsons, Bai Ling, Jason Faunt, Jorgito Vargas Jr., Luci Christian, Monica Rial, Tia Ballard, Andy Secombe, Femi Taylor, Tim Rose, Paul Blake
9–10 September 2023	Eikon Exhibition Centre	Alex McKenna, Bernard Hill, Elijah Wood, Graham McTavish, Grant Goodman, Gwydion Lashlee-Walton, Ian Somerhalder, Jackson Rathbone, John Barrowman, Kellan Lutz, Kerri Green, Kristy Swanson, Mara Wilson, Michael Rooker, Nathaniel Buzolic, Paul Wesley, Peter Blomquist, Peter Facinelli, Riley Voelkel, Rob Weithoff, Roger Clark, Ross Marquand, Sean Astin, Sean Gunn, Tami Stronach, The Burns Twins, Tom Payne, Trey Best
7–8 September 2024	Eikon Exhibition Centre	Jodie Whittaker, Mandip Gill, Billie Piper, Andy Serkis, Joseph Morgan, Persia White, Valorie Curry, Laz Alonso, Mark Sheppard, Samantha Smith, DJ Qualls, Jimmy Vee, Spencer Wilding, Khary Payton, Cooper Andrews, Pollyanna McIntosh, Maggie Grace, Kat Graham, Mick Foley, Trish Stratus, Amy Dumas (a.k.a. Lita), Rikishi, Mark Williams, Matt Ryan, Tim Downie, Dave Jones, Tracy Wiles, Amelia Tyler, Adewale Akinnuoye-Agbaje, Walter Jones, David Yost, Michael Redmond, Patrick McDonnell, Ben Keaton, Joe Rooney, Peggy (a.k.a. Dogpool)
6–7 September 2025	Eikon Exhibition Centre	Christopher Lloyd, Christopher Lambert, Sylvester McCoy, Sophie Aldred, Peter Davison, Janet Fielding, Paul McGann, Colin Baker, Nicola Bryant, John Hannah, Kurt Angle, Kevin Nash, Tyler Mane, Jake "The Snake" Roberts, Paul Anderson, Christian Serratos, Laurie Holden, Nadji Jeter, Phillip Glasser, Ned Luke, Shawn Fonteno, Jay Klaitz, Maggie Robertson, Graham McTavish, David Hayter, Quinton Flynn, Devora Wilde, Theo Solomon, Jennifer English, Aliona Baranova, Matt Ryan, Ralf Little, Ricky Tomlinson, Michael Winslow, Tony Robinson, Peggy (a.k.a. Dogpool)
19–20 September 2026	Eikon Exhibition Centre	T. J. Thyne, Charisma Carpenter, Julie Benz, Amber Benson, Kristine Sutherland, Clare Kramer, Catherine Tate, Edward James Olmos, Mary McDonnell, Jamie Bamber, David Giuntoli, Elizabeth Tulloch, Tyler Hoechlin, Lindsay Wagner, Manu Bennett, Neil Fanning, Eliza Taylor, Tom Payne, Spencer Wilding, Jimmy Vee, Tom Bennett, Robyn Lively, Jenette Goldstein, Mark Rolston, William Hope, Bart Johnson, Alan Fletcher, Dennis Taylor
18–19 September 2027	Eikon Exhibition Centre	

== See also ==
- List of comic book conventions
- Comic book convention
- List of multigenre conventions
