= Peggy =

Peggy may refer to:

== People ==
- Peggy (given name), people with the given name or nickname
- JPEGMafia (born 1989), American rapper and record producer

== Arts and entertainment ==
- Peggy (musical), a 1911 musical comedy by Stuart and Bovill
- Peggy (album), a 1977 Peggy Lee album
- Peggy (1916 film), a silent comedy
- Peggy (1950 film), a comedy
- Peggy (novel), a 1970 historical novel by Lois Duncan
- the peggies, a Japanese all-female band
- JPEGMafia, an American rapper, singer, and record producer
- "Peggy" (song), a 2024 song by English rapper Ceechynaa
- "Peggy", a 2012 song by Dala from their album Best Day
- "Peggy", a 2014 song by Elastinen

== Nautical vessels ==
- USS Peggy (SP-1072), a United States Navy patrol boat in commission from 1917 to 1918
- Peggy (1793 ship)
- Peggy, a French ship in the 1801 United States Supreme Court case United States v. Schooner Peggy
- Peggy of Castletown, an armed yacht built in 1789, the oldest surviving boat from the Isle of Man

== Other uses ==
- Mitsubishi Ki-67, a Japanese Second World War heavy bomber given the Allied code name "Peggy"
- Typhoon Peggy
- Tropical Storm Peggy (1945)
- Peggy, Texas, an unincorporated community
- Peggy Creek, South Dakota
- Peggy (Discover Card), an advertising character
- Peggy (dog), a dog known for her purported ugliness and her acting career
- Peggy (moonlet), an informal name of the moonlet of Saturn, 1 kilometre in diameter
- Peggy, the character used in cryptography systems and protocols as a prover, who interacts with the verifier to show that the intended transaction has actually taken place, often found in zero-knowledge proofs

== See also ==
- Peg (disambiguation)
- Pegi (disambiguation)
- Piggy (disambiguation)
