= Pegging =

Pegging may refer to:

- Pegging (sexual practice)
- Pegging (cribbage)
- Pegging report, a manufacturing record
- Tight rolled pants (pegged pants), in fashion
- The act of setting a fixed exchange rate between two currencies
- The act of demarcating a mining claim
- Tent pegging, an equestrian sport
- Peggle, a game about shooting pegs

== See also ==
- PEG (disambiguation)
- Pigging, a maintenance operation in pipelines
