= Pegi =

Pegi or PEGI may refer to:

- Pan European Game Information, a European video game content rating system

== People ==
- Pegi Young (1952–2019), American singer-songwriter and philanthropist
- Pegi Nicol MacLeod, (1904–1949), Canadian painter
- Pegi Vail, American anthropologist and filmmaker
- Predrag Radovanović (1911–1964), Serbian footballer and coach nicknamed "Pegi"
- Ileen Pegi (born 1992), member of the Solomon Islands women's national football team

== See also ==
- Peg (disambiguation)
- Peggy (disambiguation)
