= List of Marvel Cinematic Universe film actors =

Film franchise actors list

Marvel Cinematic Universe film actors

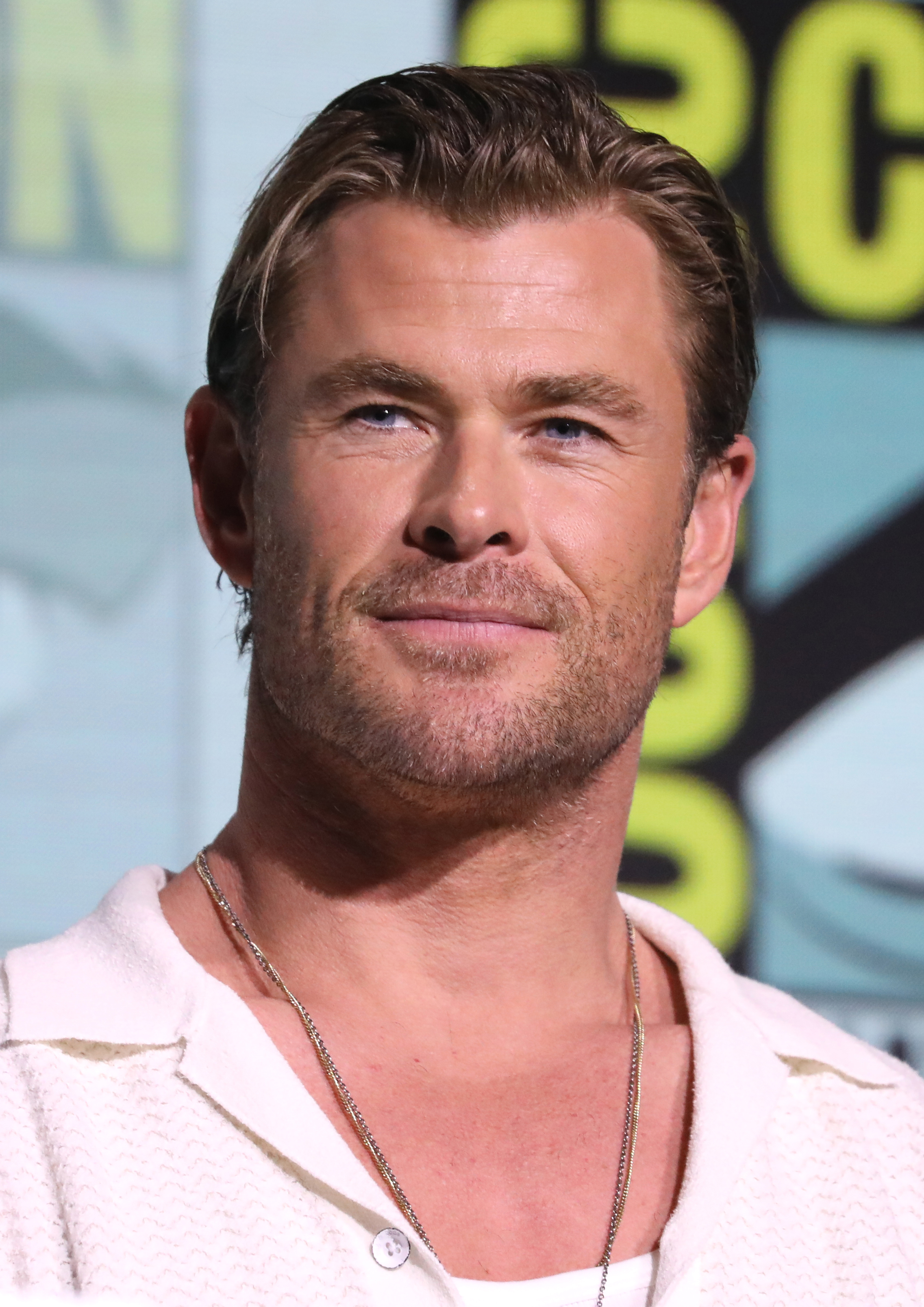
Chris Hemsworth

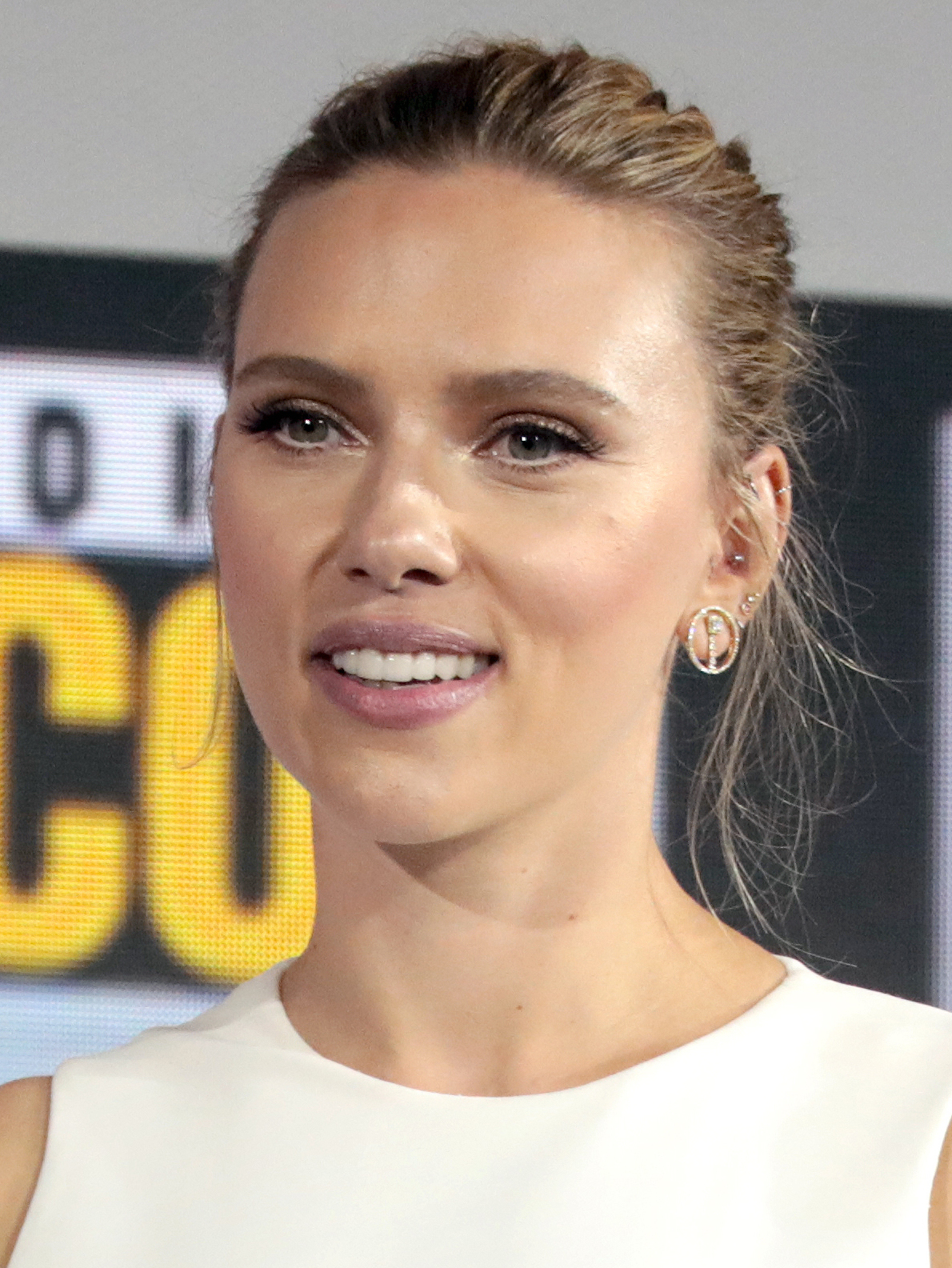
Scarlett Johansson

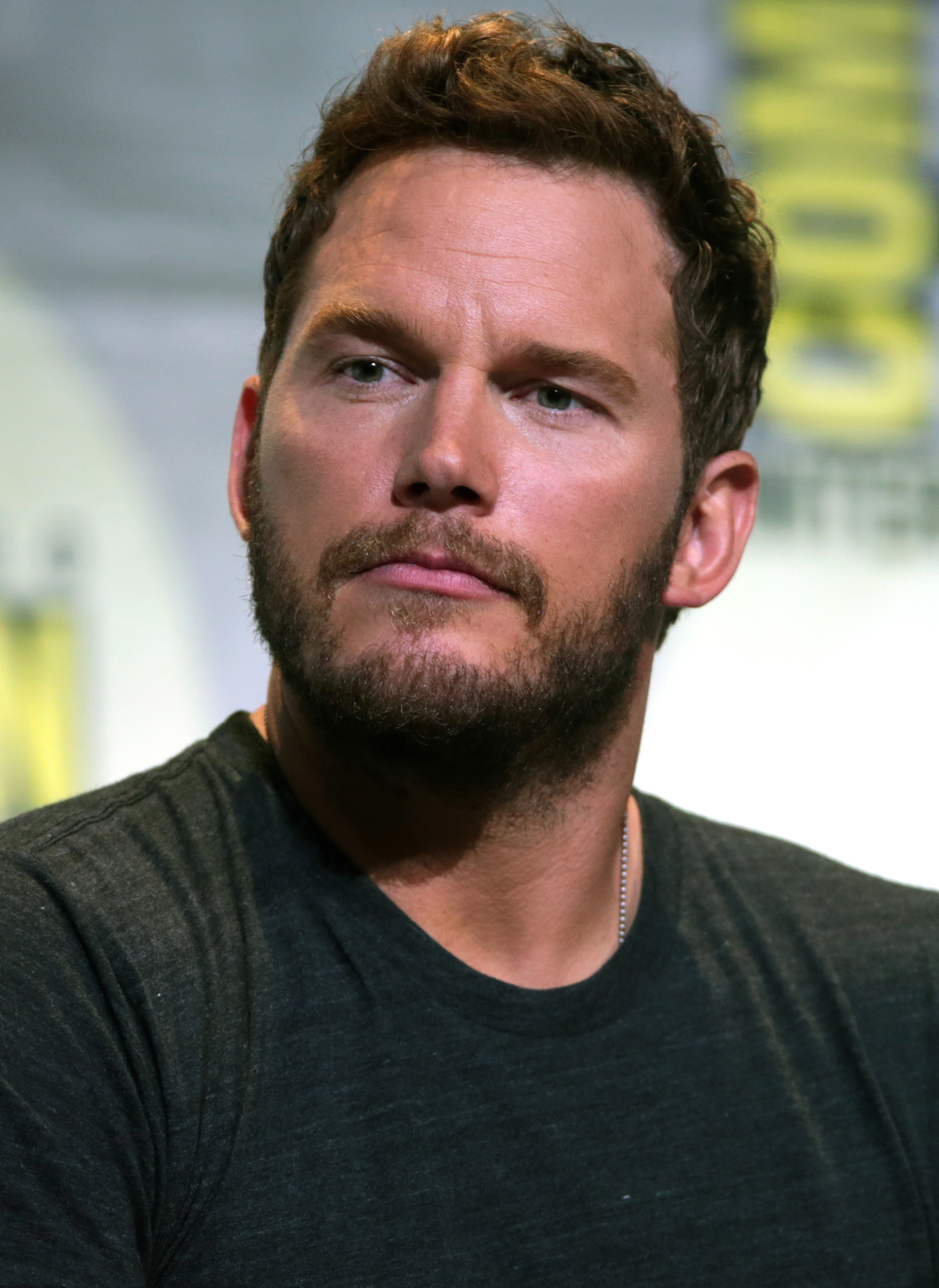
Chris Pratt

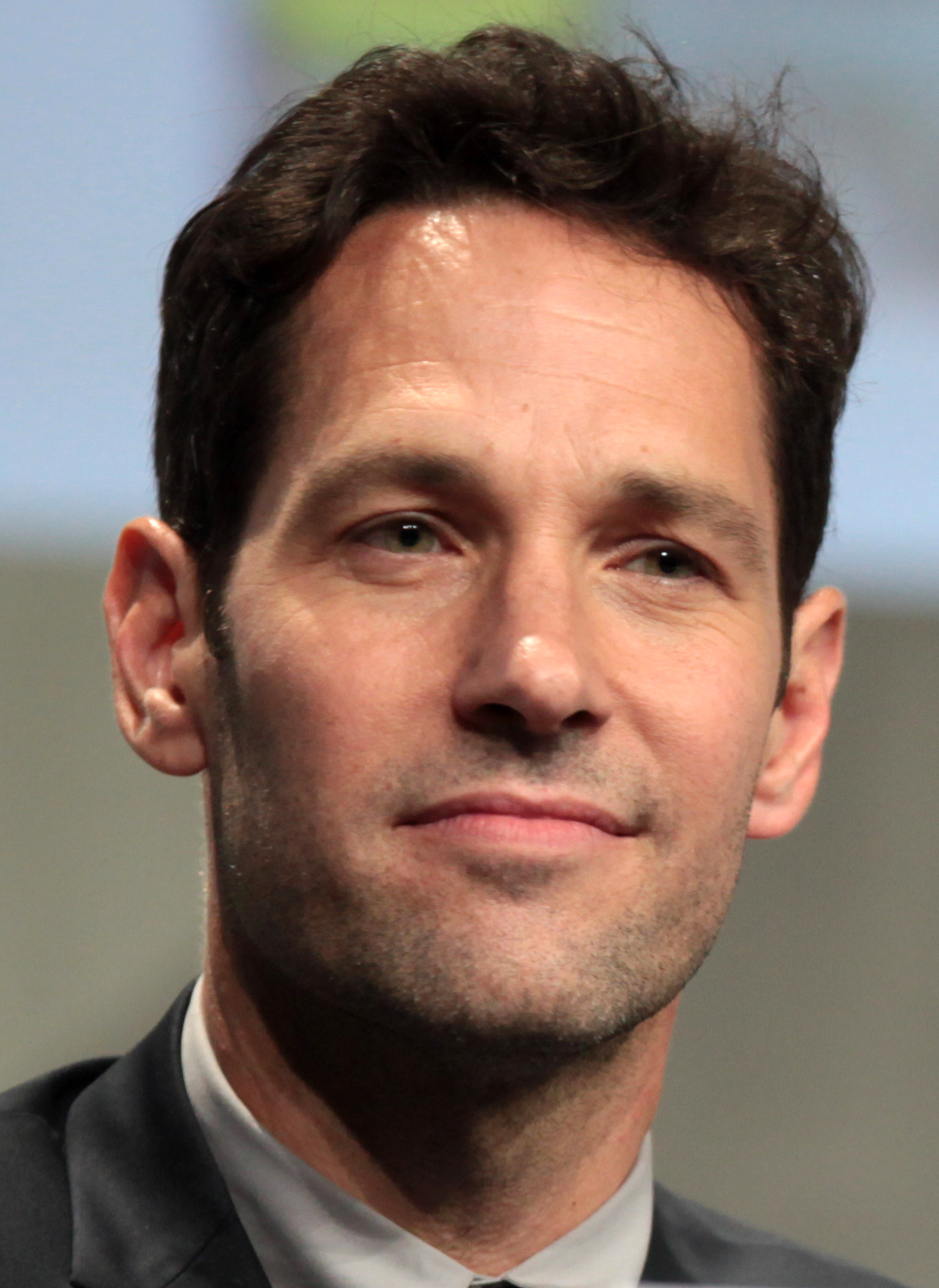
Paul Rudd

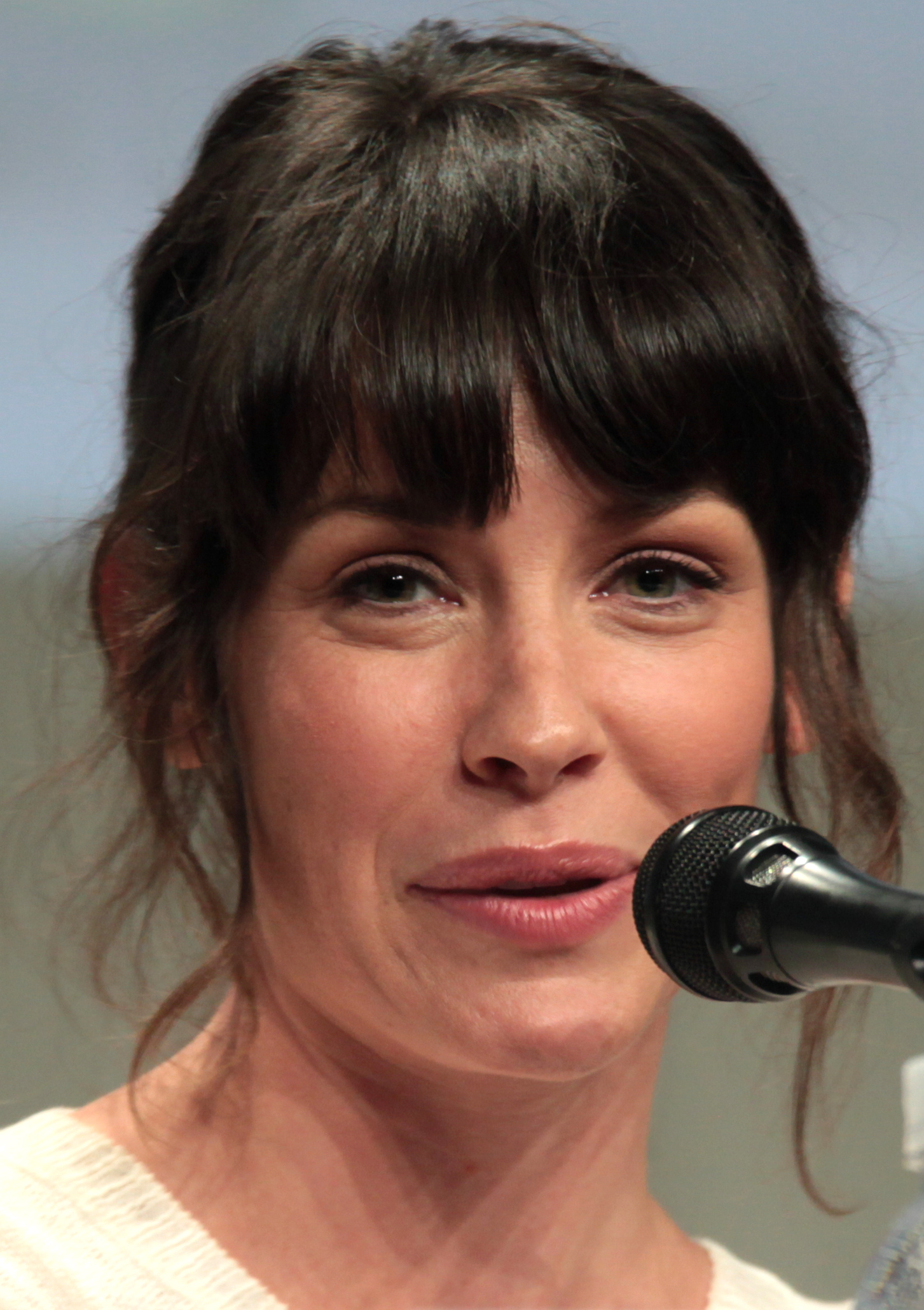
Evangeline Lilly

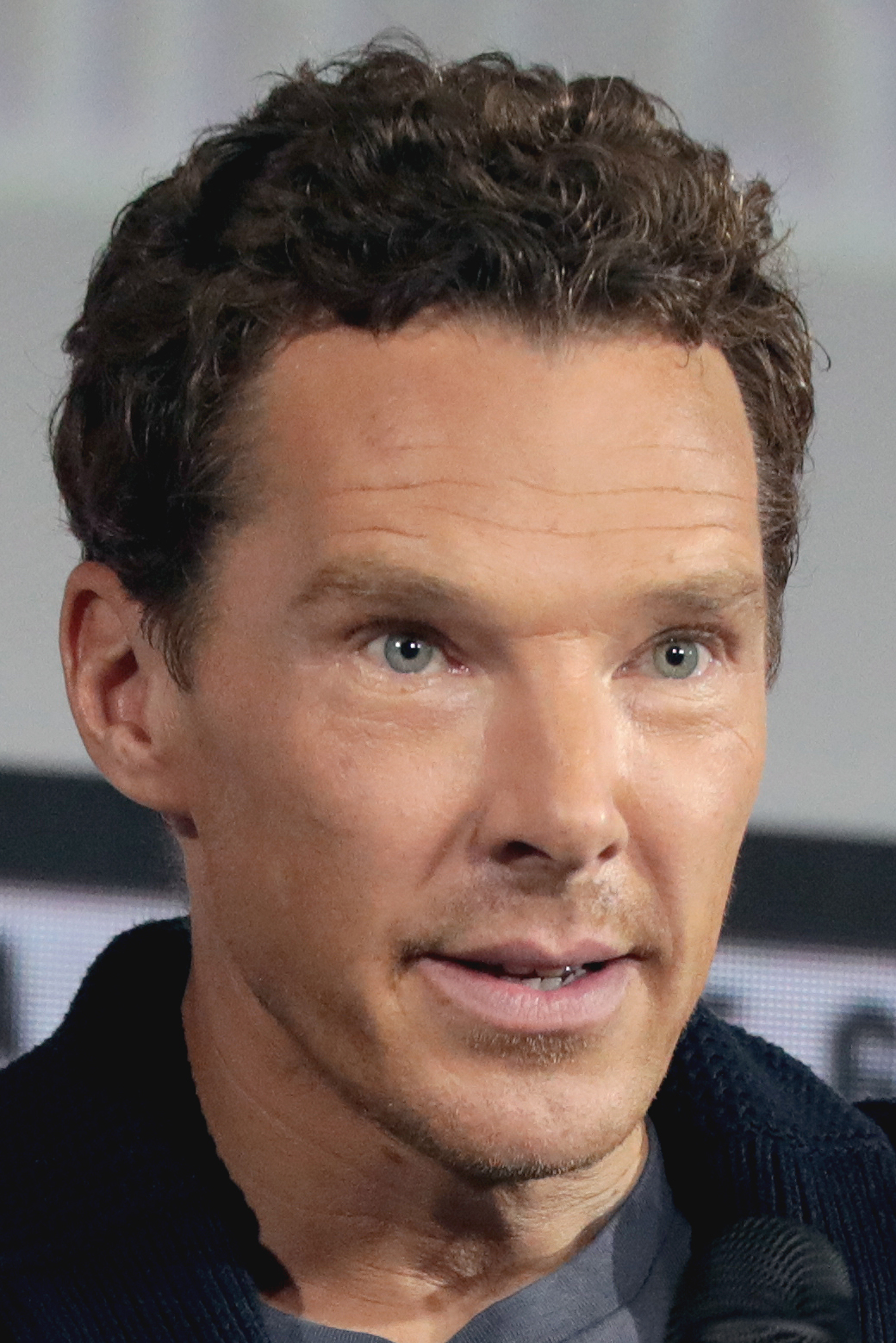
Benedict Cumberbatch

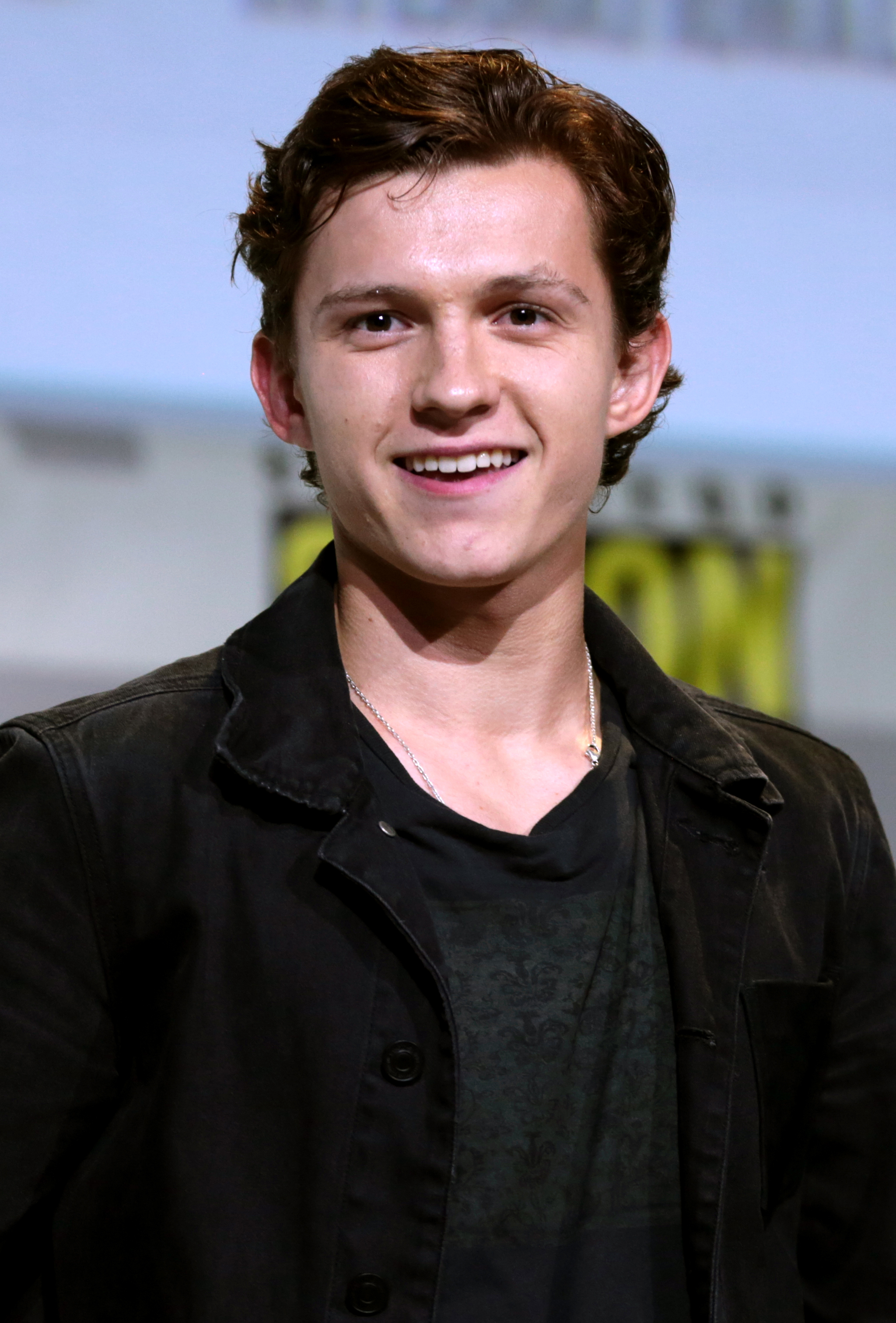
Tom Holland

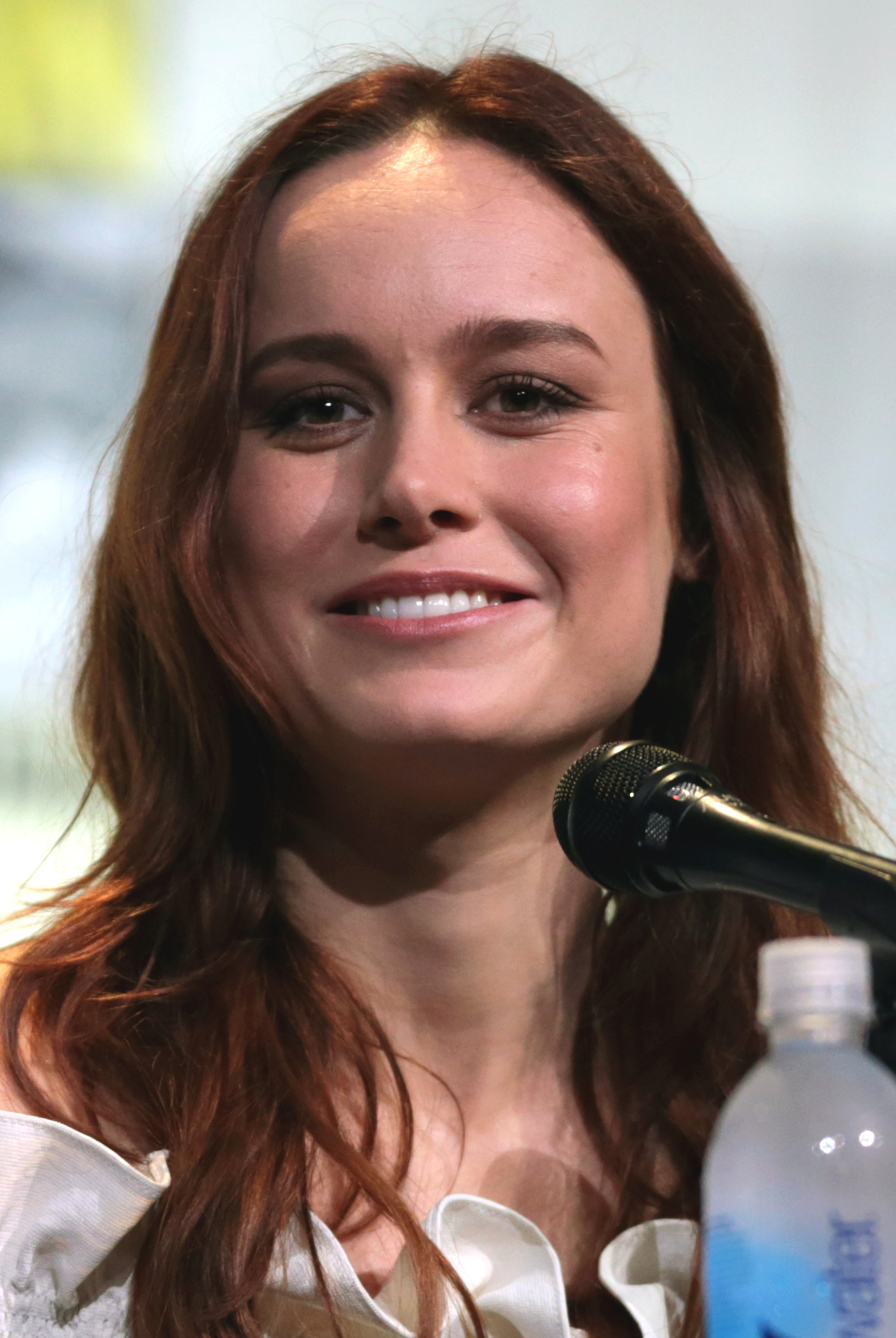
Brie Larson

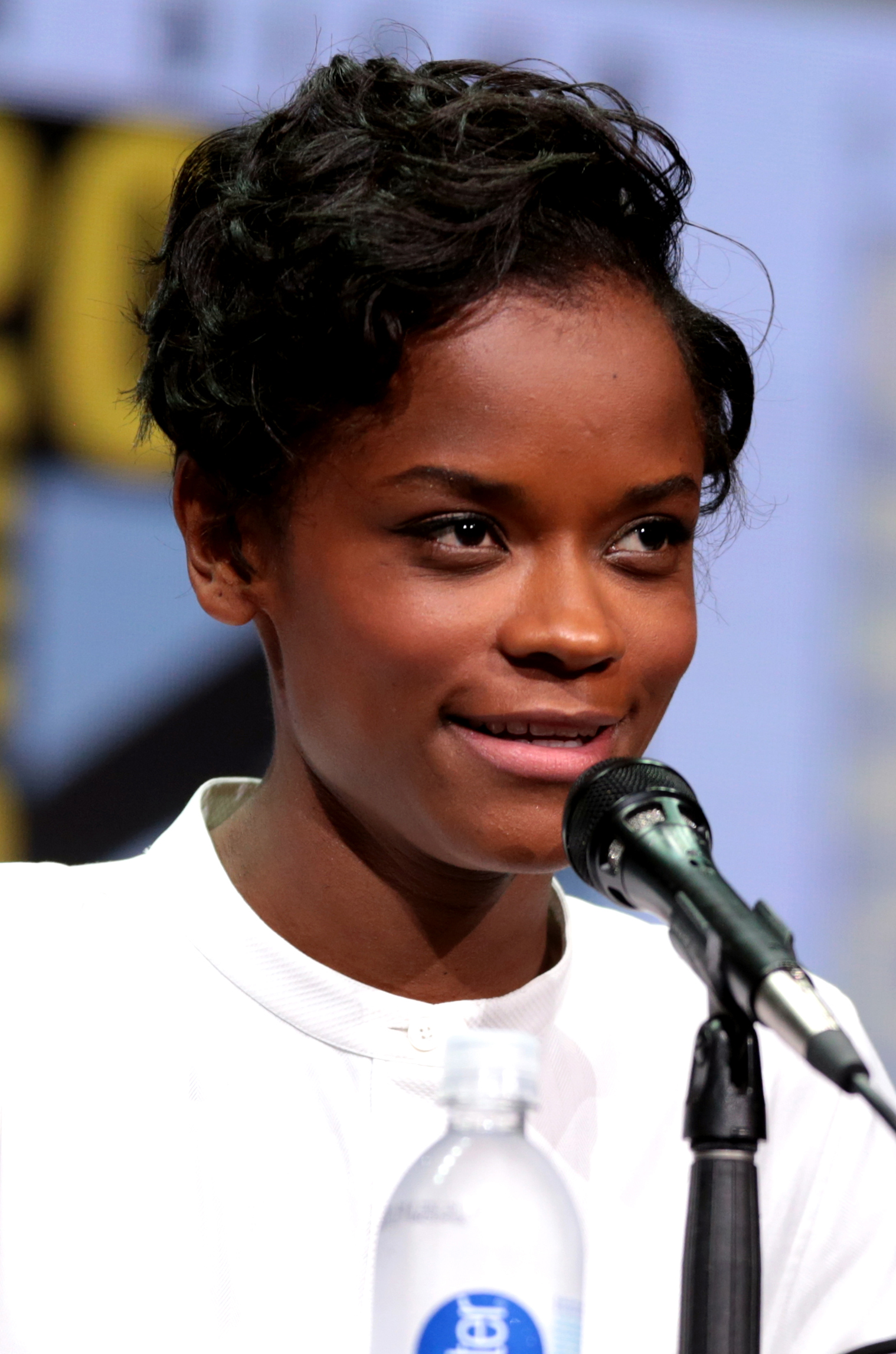
Letitia Wright

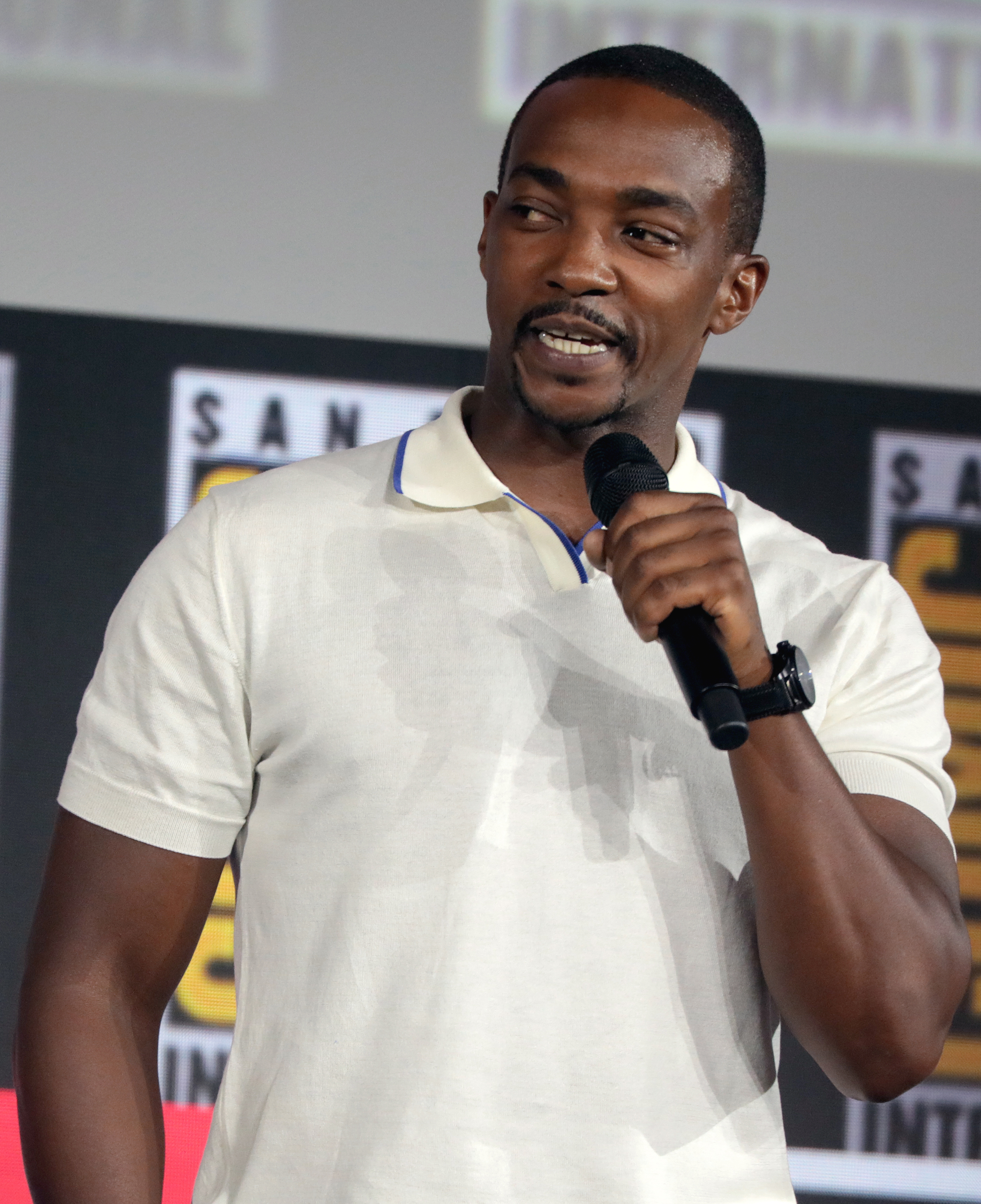
Anthony Mackie

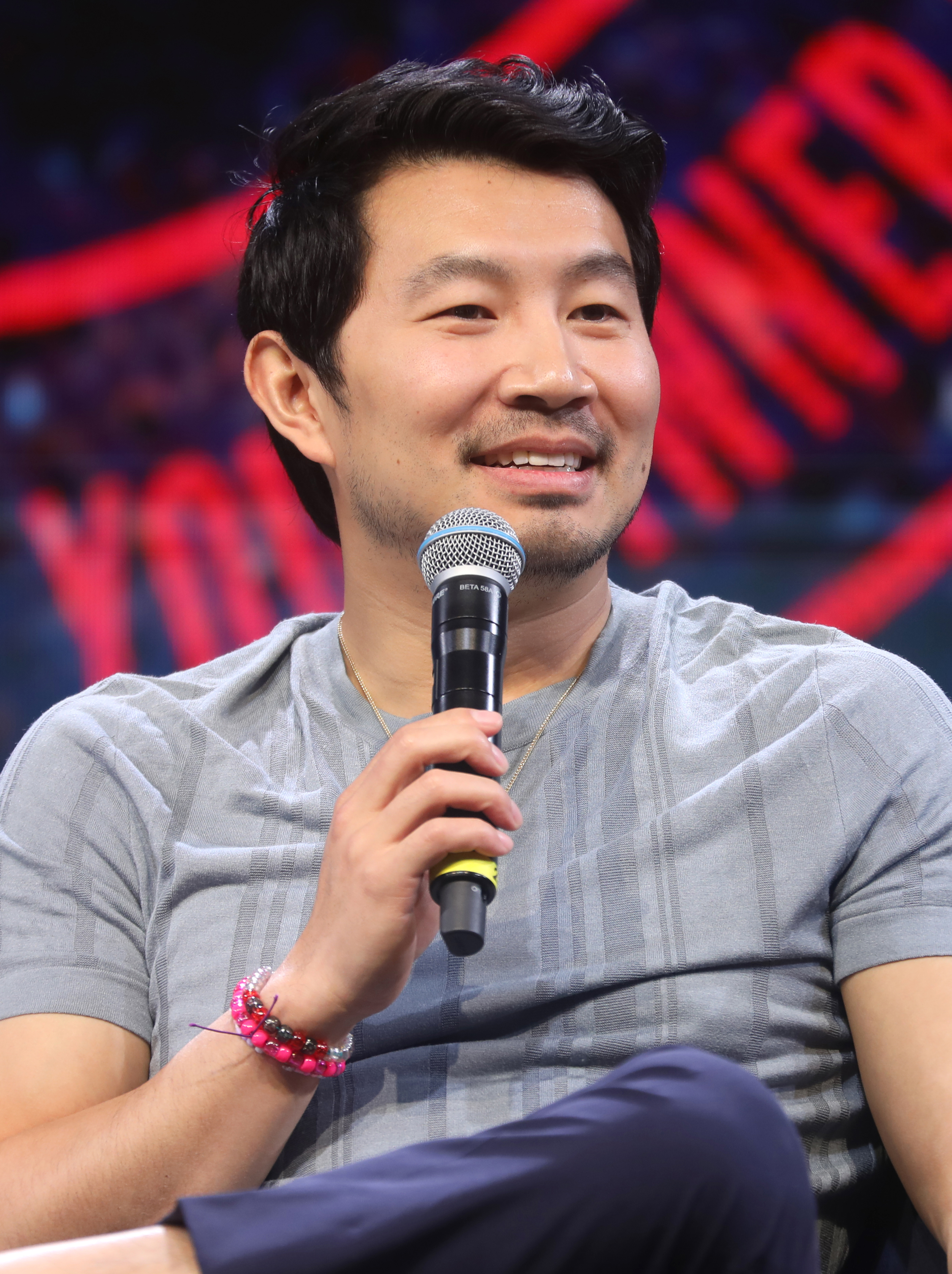
Simu Liu

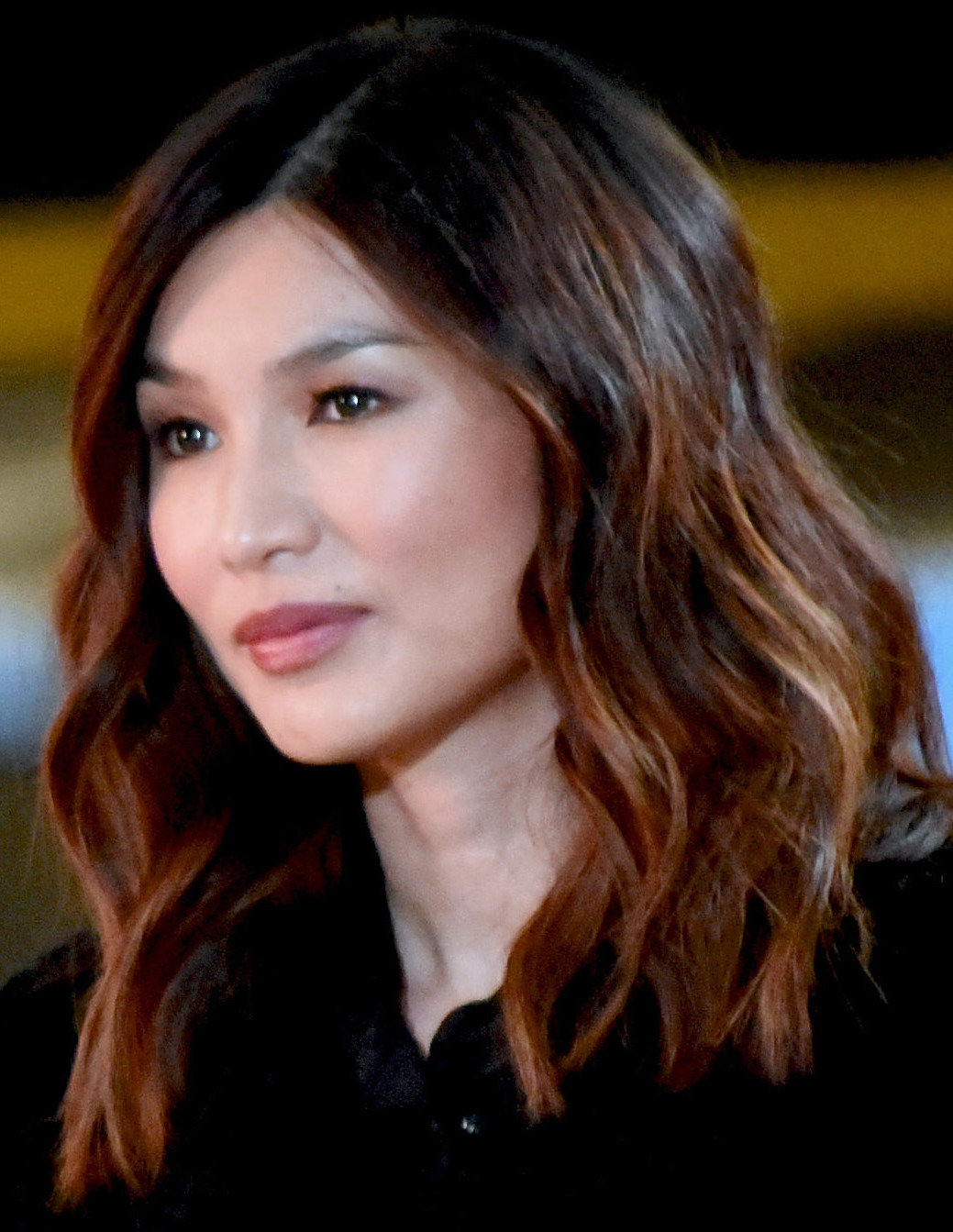
Gemma Chan

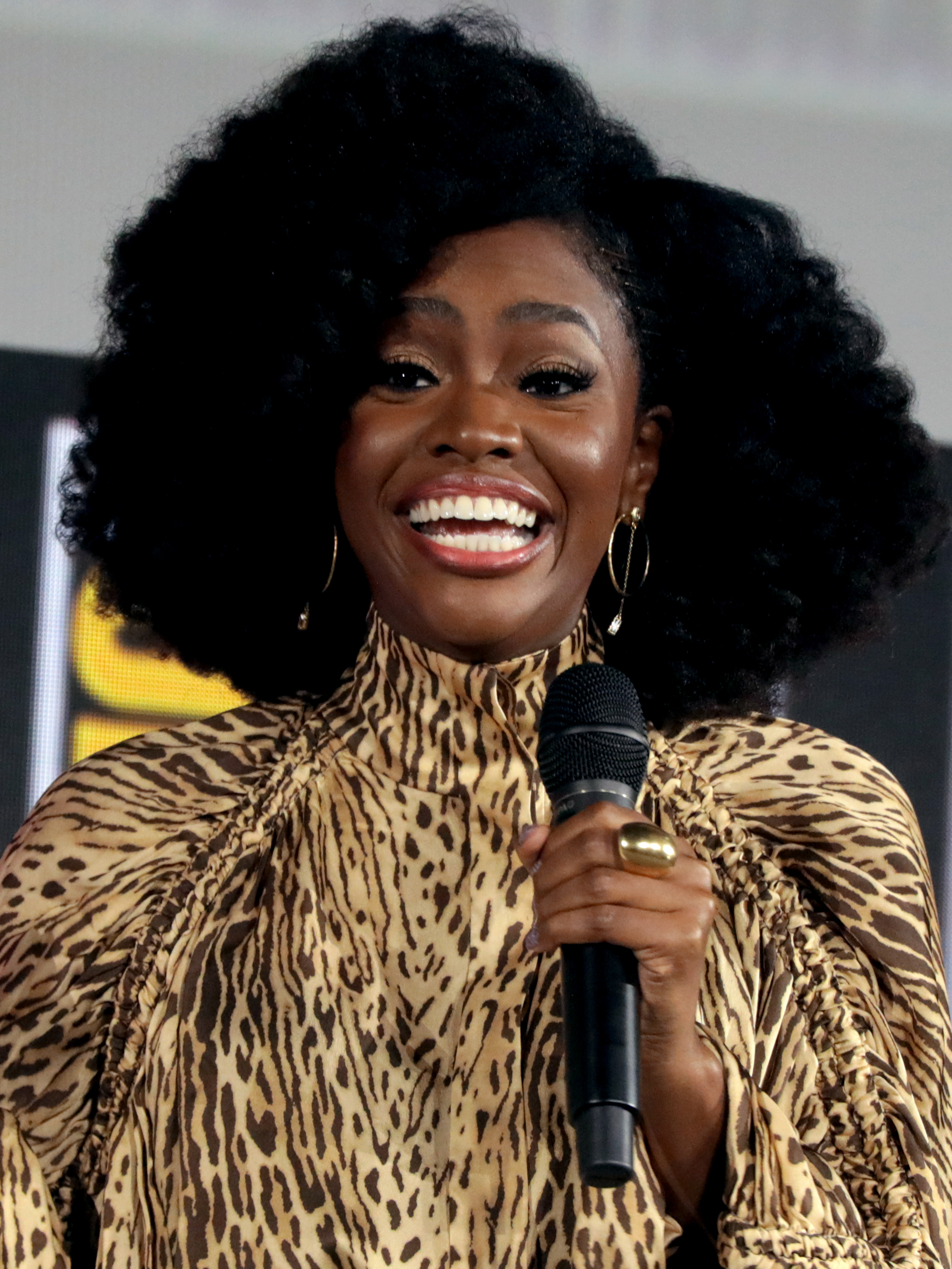
Teyonah Parris

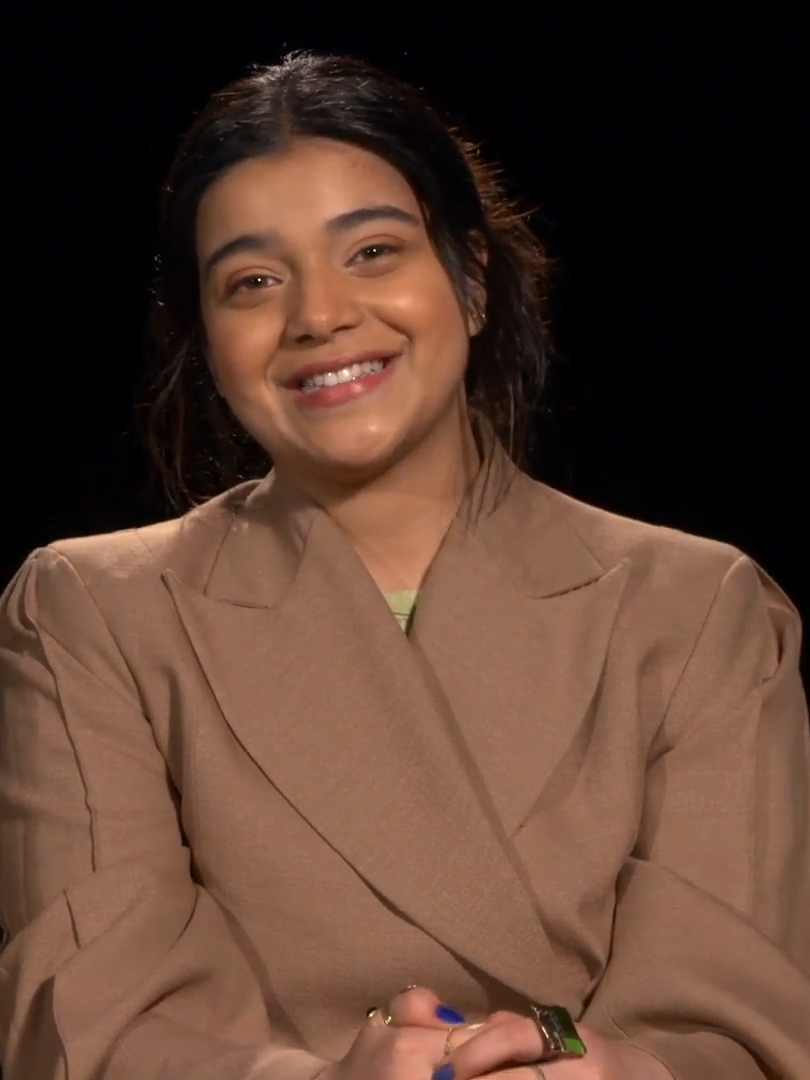
Iman Vellani

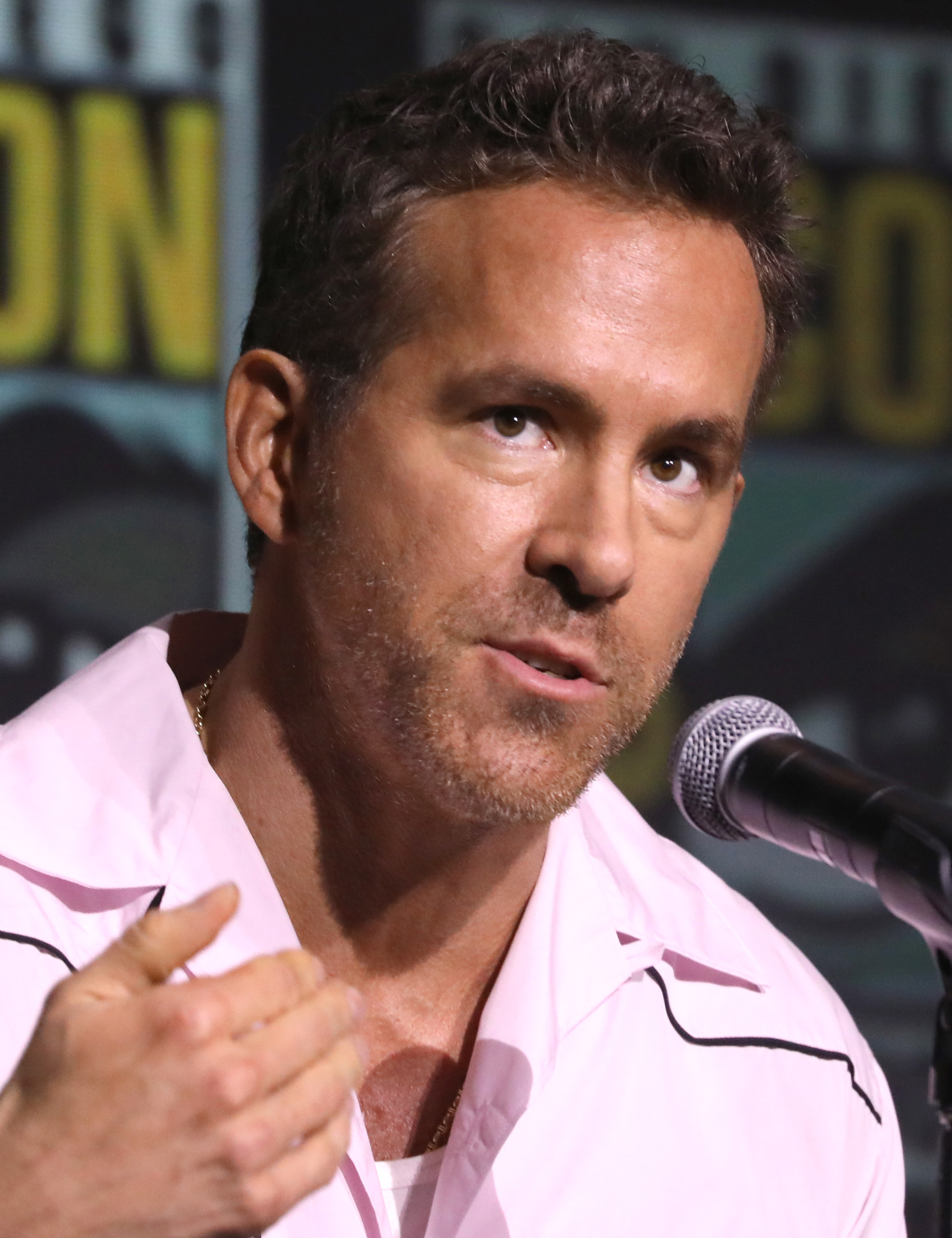
Ryan Reynolds

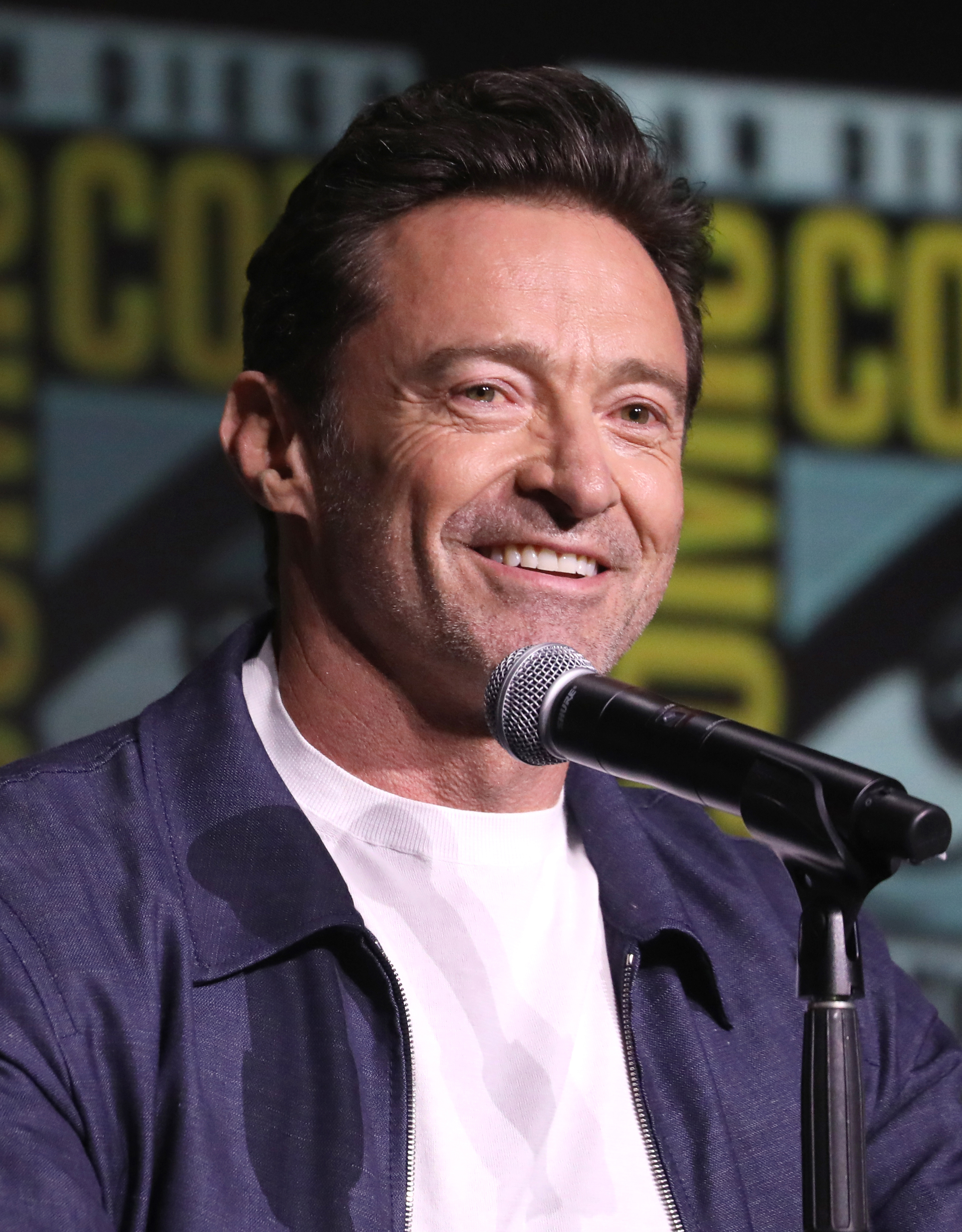
Hugh Jackman

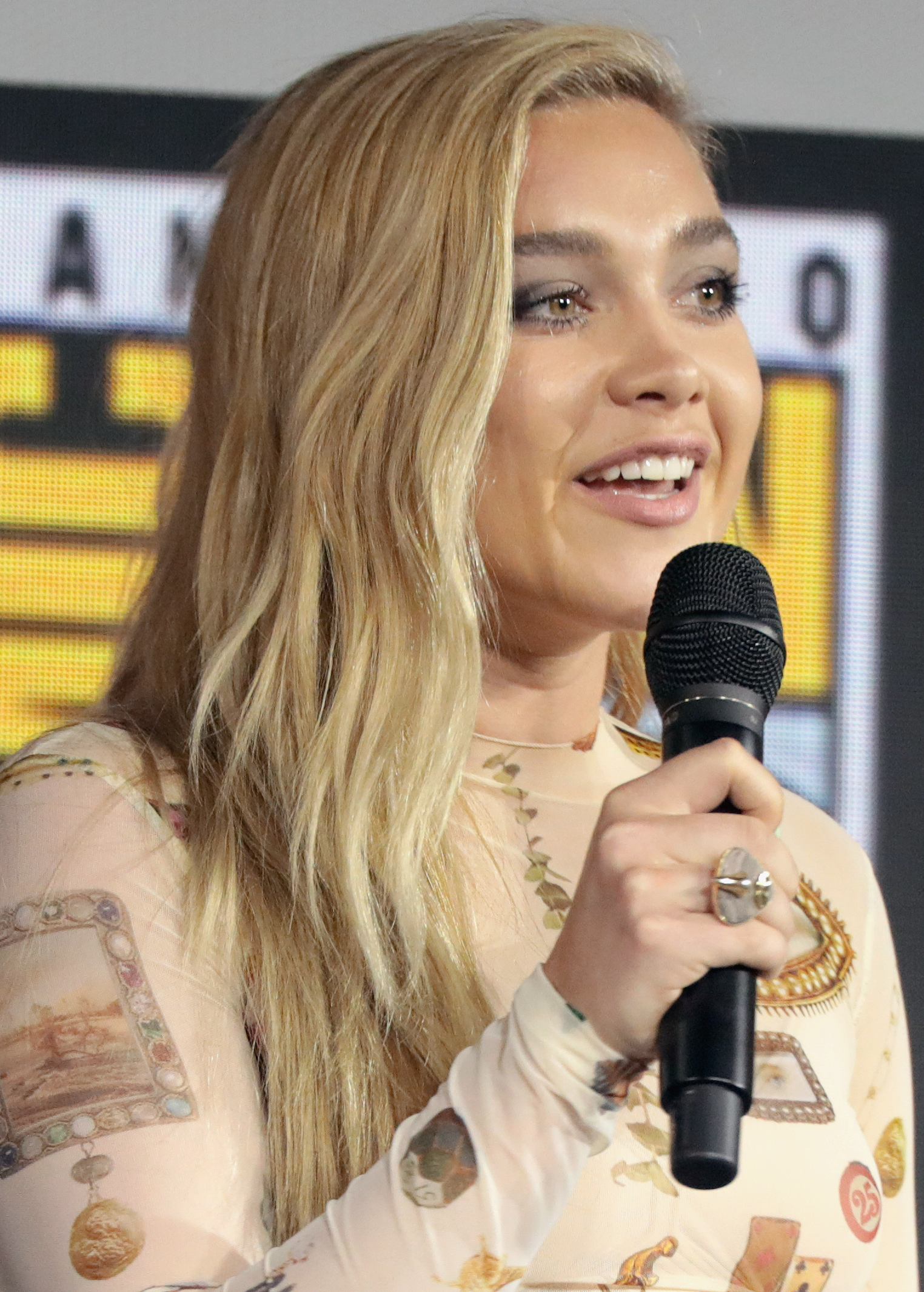
Florence Pugh

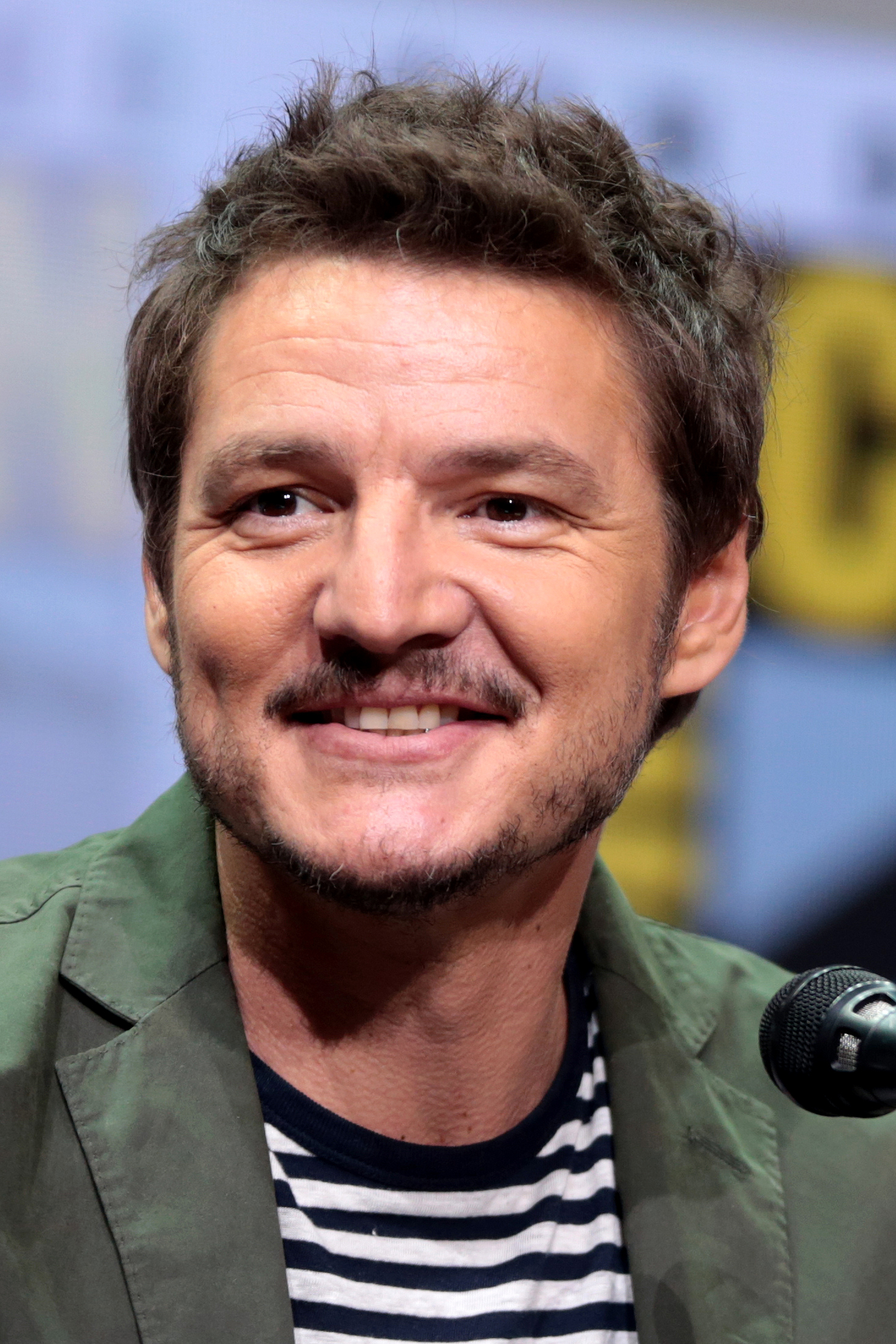
Pedro Pascal

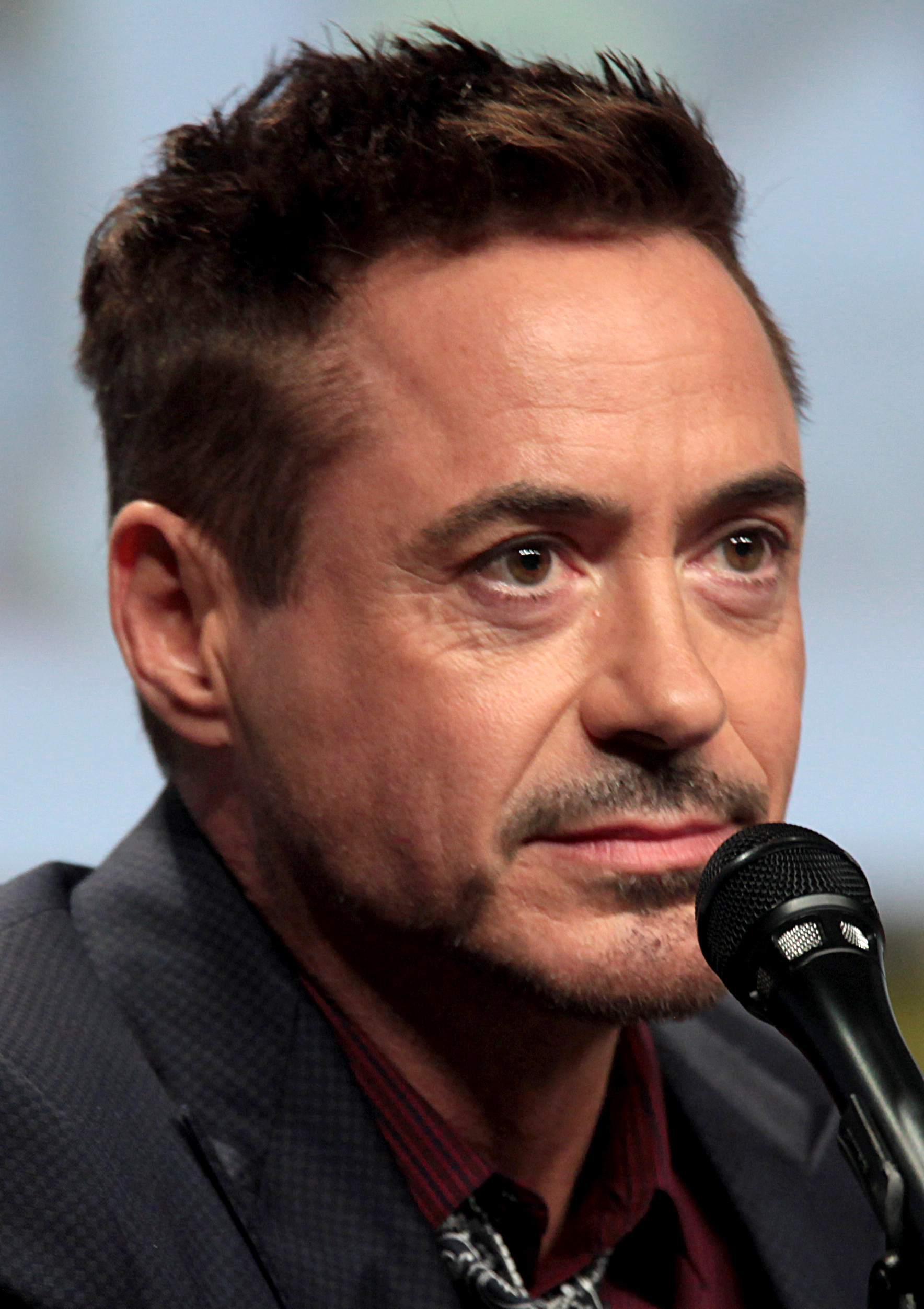
Robert Downey Jr.

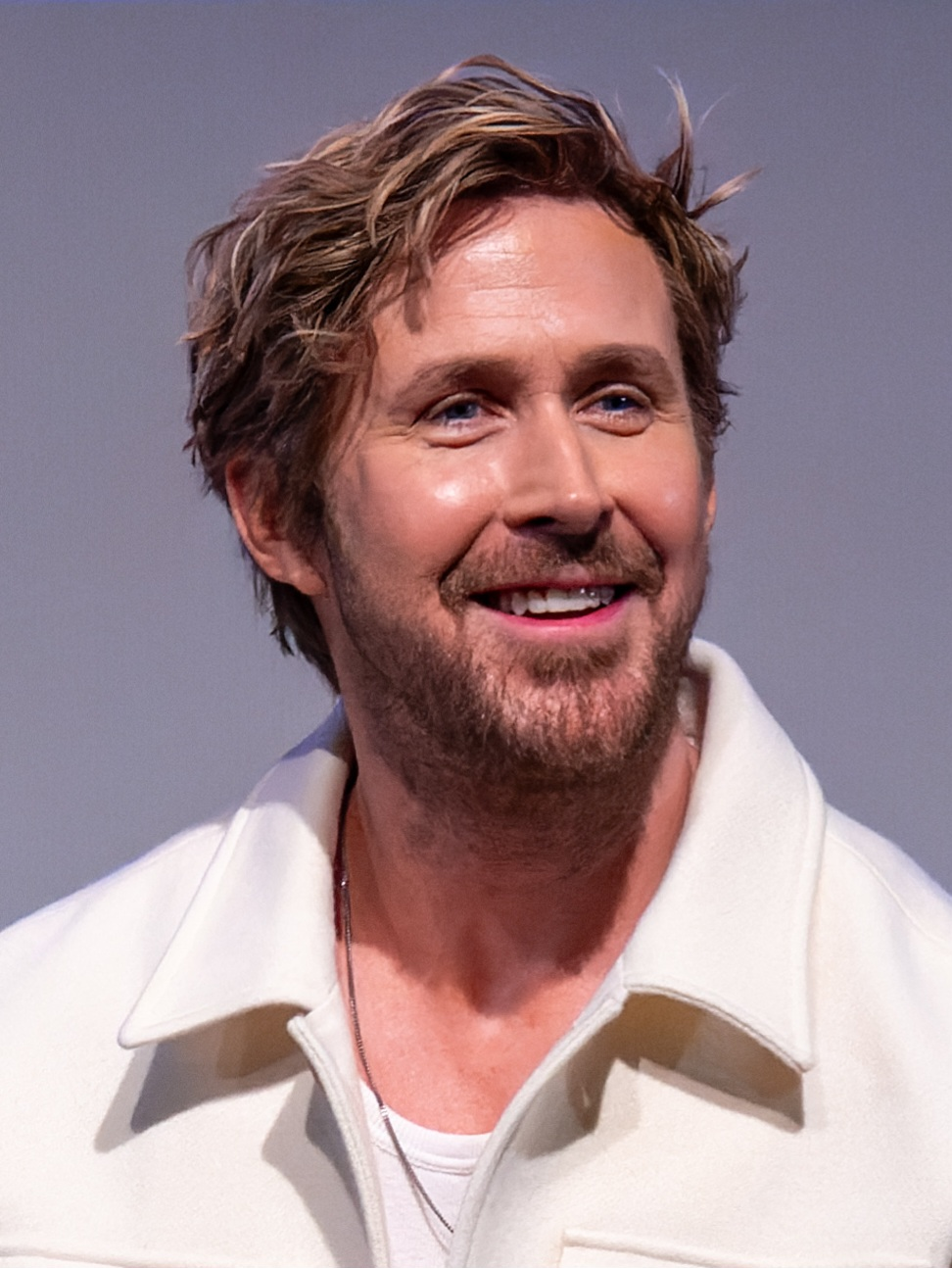
Ryan Gosling

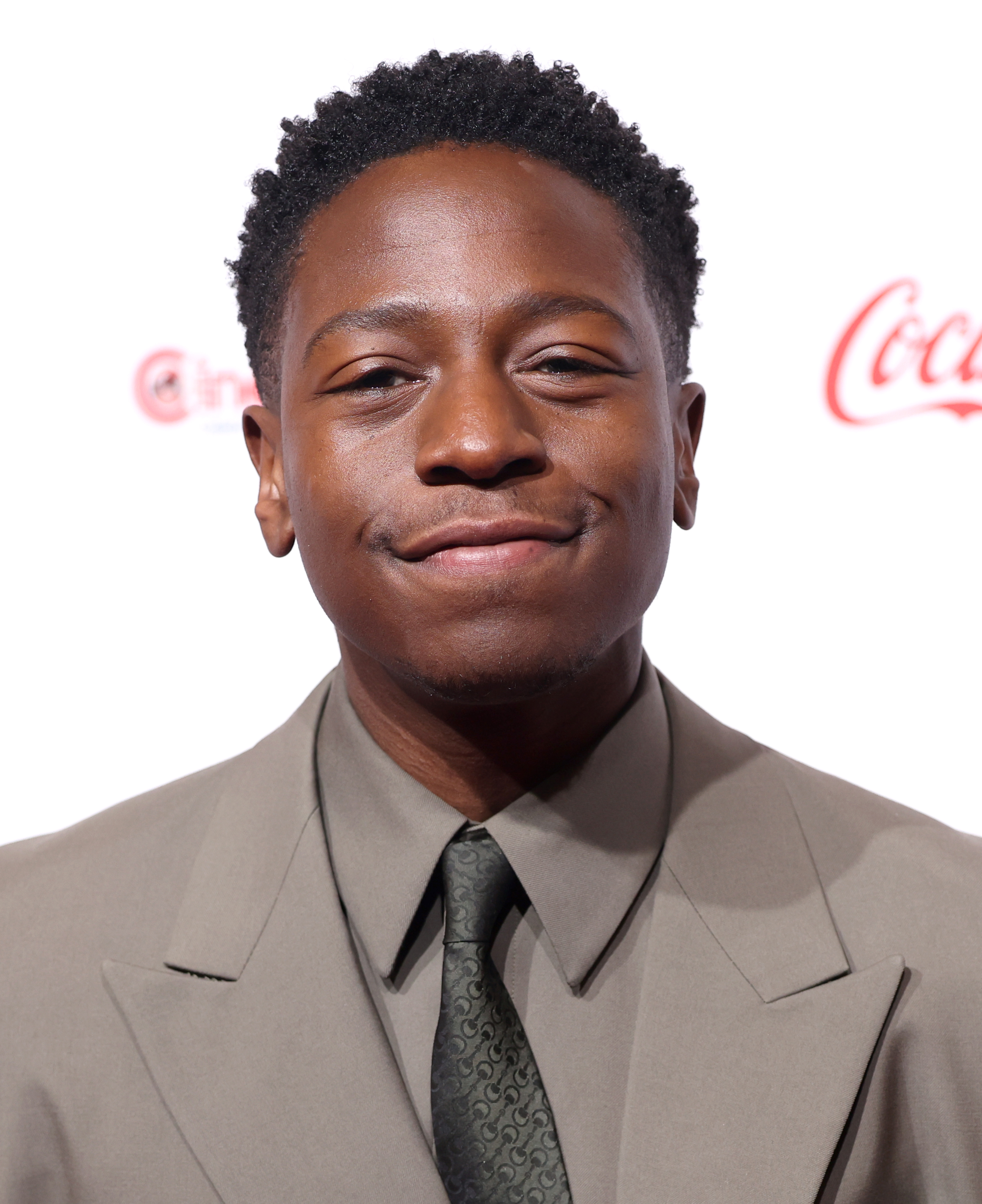
David Jonsson

Hemsworth, Johansson, Pratt, Rudd, Lilly, Cumberbatch, Holland, Larson, Wright, and Mackie return from the Infinity Saga to headline their own films in the Multiverse Saga. New headliners introduced for the Multiverse Saga include Liu and Chan in Phase Four, Vellani, Parris, Reynolds, Jackman, and Pugh in Phase Five, and Pascal in Phase Six. Downey will star as Doctor Doom in Doomsday and Secret Wars. Gosling and Jonsson are set to headline their own films after the Multiverse Saga.

The Marvel Cinematic Universe is a media franchise and shared universe that is the setting of superhero films produced by Marvel Studios, based on characters that appear in Marvel Comics publications. Phases One, Two, and Three, were known as "The Infinity Saga", featuring many franchises and their sequels, and the first four Avengers crossover films. Phase Four features four sequels to earlier films and three new film properties, with Phase Five featuring four sequels and two new properties, and Phase Six intended to feature three sequels and one new property, including the crossover films Avengers: Doomsday (2026) and Avengers: Secret Wars (2027). Phases Four, Five, and Six comprise "The Multiverse Saga".

As the franchise is composed of films adapted from a variety of Marvel Comics properties, there are multiple lead actors. Chris Hemsworth headlined as Thor in the Thor films in the Infinity Saga and again in Thor: Love and Thunder (2022); Chris Pratt portrays the lead character, Peter Quill / Star-Lord, in the Guardians of the Galaxy films and returns for its sequel Guardians of the Galaxy Vol. 3 (2023) and joined Hemsworth in Love and Thunder; Paul Rudd stars as Scott Lang / Ant-Man and Evangeline Lilly co-stars as Hope van Dyne / Wasp in the Ant-Man films, with both actors returning for Ant-Man and the Wasp: Quantumania (2023); Benedict Cumberbatch portrays Stephen Strange and appears again in Doctor Strange in the Multiverse of Madness (2022); Tom Holland portrays Peter Parker / Spider-Man in the Spider-Man films and returns in Spider-Man: No Way Home (2021), where he is joined by Cumberbatch, and Spider-Man: Brand New Day (2026); and Brie Larson portrays Carol Danvers / Captain Marvel and appears again in The Marvels (2023), along with Teyonah Parris as Monica Rambeau and Iman Vellani as Kamala Khan / Ms. Marvel.

Actors who have supporting roles in the Infinity Saga headline their own films in the Multiverse Saga, including Scarlett Johansson as Natasha Romanoff / Black Widow in Black Widow (2021), Letitia Wright as Shuri / Black Panther in Black Panther: Wakanda Forever (2022), and Anthony Mackie as Sam Wilson / Captain America in Captain America: Brave New World (2025). New headliners include Simu Liu as Shang-Chi in Shang-Chi and the Legend of the Ten Rings (2021), Gemma Chan as Sersi in the ensemble film Eternals (2021), Ryan Reynolds as Wade Wilson / Deadpool and Hugh Jackman as James "Logan" Howlett / Wolverine—both reprising their roles from 20th Century Fox's X-Men film series—in Deadpool & Wolverine (2024), Florence Pugh as Yelena Belova / Black Widow in the ensemble film Thunderbolts* (2025), also joining Johansson in Black Widow and Holland in Brand New Day, and Pedro Pascal as Reed Richards / Mister Fantastic in the ensemble film The Fantastic Four: First Steps (2025). Wright, Mackie, Liu, Pugh, and Pascal will appear in Avengers: Doomsday and Avengers: Secret Wars, with Hemsworth and Rudd also appearing in Doomsday. After the Multiverse Saga, Ryan Gosling will star as Johnny Blaze / Ghost Rider in Ghost Rider (2028) after being introduced in Secret Wars, and David Jonsson will headline Black Panther III (2028) as T'Challa II / Black Panther, joined by Wright.

Multiple other cast members recur across multiple films and series within the franchise, while the Multiverse Saga prominently features several actors reprising their roles from prior non-MCU Marvel films produced by Fox, New Line Cinema, and Sony Pictures. In addition to Reynolds and Jackman, these include Thomas Haden Church, Willem Dafoe, Jamie Foxx, Andrew Garfield, Tom Hardy, Rhys Ifans, Tobey Maguire, Alfred Molina, and J. K. Simmons in No Way Home; Patrick Stewart in Multiverse of Madness; Kelsey Grammer in The Marvels; Morena Baccarin, Rob Delaney, Chris Evans, Jennifer Garner, Brianna Hildebrand, Stefan Kapičić, Dafne Keen, Shioli Kutsuna, Tyler Mane, Wesley Snipes, Karan Soni, Aaron Stanford, Lewis Tan, and Leslie Uggams in Deadpool & Wolverine; and Alan Cumming, James Marsden, Ian McKellen, and Rebecca Romijn alongside Stewart and Grammer in Doomsday.

The list below is sorted by film and the character's surname, as some characters have been portrayed by multiple actors. All characters that have made appearances in other MCU media, such as the short films, television series, or digital series, are noted.

== The Infinity Saga ==
Phase One of the franchise includes six films, featuring four different superhero properties, leading up to a crossover in the 2012 film Marvel's The Avengers. The franchise's Phase Two features three sequels to Phase One films, as well as two new film properties, and the crossover Avengers: Age of Ultron, which was released in 2015. Phase Three features four sequels to earlier films, and four new film properties, as well as the crossover films Avengers: Infinity War (2018) and Avengers: Endgame (2019). The films from Phase One through Phase Three are collectively known as "The Infinity Saga".

The Infinity Saga saw multiple lead actors: Robert Downey Jr. stars as Tony Stark / Iron Man; Edward Norton headlined The Incredible Hulk (2008), playing Bruce Banner / Hulk, but did not reprise the role in the future films, being replaced by Mark Ruffalo for all subsequent films involving the character; Chris Evans portrays Steve Rogers / Captain America; Chris Hemsworth plays Thor; Chris Pratt portrays Peter Quill / Star-Lord; Paul Rudd co-stars as Scott Lang / Ant-Man with Evangeline Lilly as Hope van Dyne / Wasp; Benedict Cumberbatch portrays Stephen Strange; Tom Holland portrays Peter Parker / Spider-Man; Chadwick Boseman portrayed T'Challa / Black Panther; and Brie Larson portrays Carol Danvers / Captain Marvel.

Samuel L. Jackson had cameo and supporting appearances as Nick Fury in several of the early films in the franchise, before co-starring in The Avengers; he would continue to have supporting roles in later films as well. Multiple other cast members recur across multiple films within the saga.

== The Multiverse Saga ==
=== Phase Four ===
List indicators
This section includes characters who have appeared in films in the Phase.
- A dark grey cell indicates the character was not in the film.
- A ^{5} indicates the character reappears in a Phase Five film.
- A ^{6} indicates the character reappears in a Phase Six film.
- A ^{617} indicates the character is an alternate version from Earth-617.
- An ^{838} indicates the character is an alternate version from Earth-838.
- An ^{A} indicates an appearance through archival footage.
- A ^{C} indicates an uncredited cameo role.
- A ^{DS} indicates the character appears in a digital series.
- An ^{MC} indicates a motion-capture-only role.
- An ^{MS} indicates the character appears in a Marvel Studios television series.
- An ^{MT} indicates the character appears in a Marvel Television series.
- An ^{OS} indicates the character appears in a One-Shot.
- An ^{SP} indicates the character appears in a Marvel Studios Special Presentation.
- A ^{V} indicates a voice-only role.
- A ^{Y} indicates a younger version of the character.

Character	2021				2022		
Character	Black Widow	Shang-Chi and the Legend of the Ten Rings	Eternals	Spider-Man: No Way Home	Doctor Strange in the Multiverse of Madness	Thor: Love and Thunder	Black Panther: Wakanda Forever
==== Introduced in prior Marvel media ====
Eddie Brock Venom (Note: First appeared in Venom (2018).)				Tom Hardy^{C}			
Curt Connors Lizard				Rhys Ifans			
Max Dillon Electro				Jamie Foxx			
Flint Marko Sandman (Note: First appeared in Spider-Man 3 (2007).)				Thomas Haden Church			
Otto Octavius Doctor Octopus				Alfred Molina			
Norman Osborn Green Goblin				Willem Dafoe			
Peter Parker Spider-Man / "Peter-Three" (Note: First appeared in The Amazing Spider-Man (2012).)				Andrew Garfield			
Peter Parker Spider-Man / "Peter-Two" (Note: First appeared in Spider-Man (2002).)				Tobey Maguire			
==== Introduced in The Infinity Saga ====
Ayo^{MS}							Florence Kasumba
Bruce Banner^{6} ^{MS} ^{OS}		Mark Ruffalo^{C}					
Clint Barton Hawkeye^{6} ^{MS}	Jeremy Renner^{V}^{C}						
Quentin Beck Mysterio				Jake Gyllenhaal^{A}			
Emil Blonsky Abomination^{MS}		Tim Roth^{V}^{C}					
Betty Brant^{DS}				Angourie Rice			
Carol Danvers Captain Marvel^{5} ^{MS}		Brie Larson^{C}					
Julius Dell				J. B. Smoove			
Drax the Destroyer^{5} ^{SP}						Dave Bautista	
E.D.I.T.H.				Dawn Michelle King^{A}^{V}			
Fandral						Zachary Levi^{A}	
Foster				Gary Weeks			
Jane Foster Mighty Thor						Natalie Portman	
Frigga						Rene Russo^{A} Chanique Greyling^{Y}	
Griot							Trevor Noah^{V}
Groot^{5} ^{SP}						Vin Diesel^{V}	
Hamir					Topo Wresniwiro		
Heimdall						Idris Elba	
Roger Harrington				Martin Starr			
Harold "Happy" Hogan				Jon Favreau			
Hogun						Tadanobu Asano^{A}	
J. Jonah Jameson^{DS}				J. K. Simmons			
Michelle "MJ" Jones-Watson				Zendaya			
Korg						Taika Waititi	
Ned Leeds^{DS}				Jacob Batalon			
Darcy Lewis^{MS}						Kat Dennings	
Loki^{6}						Tom Hiddleston^{A}	
Mantis^{5} ^{SP}						Pom Klementieff	
Wanda Maximoff Scarlet Witch^{MS}					Elizabeth Olsen		
M'Baku^{6}							Winston Duke
Nakia							Lupita Nyong'o
Nebula^{5} ^{SP}						Karen Gillan	
N'Jadaka / Erik "Killmonger" Stevens							Michael B. Jordan
Kraglin Obfonteri^{5} ^{SP}						Sean Gunn	
Odin						Anthony Hopkins^{A}	
Okoye^{MS}							Danai Gurira
Christine Palmer					Rachel McAdams		
May Parker^{6}				Marisa Tomei			
Peter Parker Spider-Man^{6} ^{DS}				Tom Holland			
Peter Quill Star-Lord^{5} ^{SP}						Chris Pratt	
Ramonda							Angela Bassett
Rocket^{5} ^{SP}						Bradley Cooper^{V}	
Natasha Romanoff Black Widow	Scarlett Johansson						
Everett K. Ross^{MS}							Martin Freeman
Thaddeus Ross^{5}	William Hurt						
Erik Selvig						Stellan Skarsgård	
Shuri Black Panther^{6}							Letitia Wright
Sif^{MS} ^{MT}						Jaimie Alexander	
Trevor Slattery^{MS} ^{OS}		Ben Kingsley					
Stephen Strange^{6}				Benedict Cumberbatch	Benedict Cumberbatch		
T'Challa							Chadwick Boseman^{A}
Eugene "Flash" Thompson^{DS}				Tony Revolori			
Thor^{6} ^{OS}						Chris Hemsworth	
Valkyrie						Tessa Thompson	
Volstagg						Ray Stevenson^{A}	
Nicodemus West					Michael Stuhlbarg		
Wilson^{DS}				Hannibal Buress			
Wong^{6} ^{MS}		Benedict Wong		Benedict Wong	Benedict Wong		
==== Introduced in Marvel Television series ====
Matt Murdock^{6} ^{MS}				Charlie Cox			
==== Introduced in Phase Four television series ====
Valentina Allegra de Fontaine^{5}	Julia Louis-Dreyfus^{C}						Julia Louis-Dreyfus
==== Introduced in Black Widow ====
Yelena Belova^{5} ^{6} ^{MS}	Florence Pugh						
Antonia Dreykov Taskmaster^{5}	Olga Kurylenko						
Dreykov	Ray Winstone						
Helen Black Widow	Jade Xu	Jade Xu					
Ingrid	Nanna Blondell						
Lerato	Liani Samuel						
Rick Mason^{MS}	O-T Fagbenle						
Oksana	Michelle Lee						
Alexei Shostakov Red Guardian^{5} ^{6}	David Harbour						
Ursa	Olivier Richters						
Melina Vostokoff Black Widow	Rachel Weisz						
==== Introduced in Shang-Chi and the Legend of the Ten Rings ====
Mrs. Chen		Jodi Long					
Death Dealer		Andy Le					
Guang Bo		Yuen Wah					
Hui		Paul He					
John		Kunal Dudhekar					
Jon Jon		Ronny Chieng					
Katy		Awkwafina					
Razor Fist		Florian Munteanu					
Ruihua		Dallas Liu					
Soo		Stephanie Hsu					
Waipo		Tsai Chin					
Xu Shang-Chi / Shaun^{6}		Simu Liu Jaden Zhang^{Y} Arnold Sun^{Y}					
Xu Wenwu		Tony Leung					
Xu Xialing		Meng'er Zhang Elodie Fong^{Y} Harmonie He^{Y}					
Ying Li		Fala Chen					
Ying Nan		Michelle Yeoh					
==== Introduced in Eternals ====
Ajak			Salma Hayek				
Arishem			David Kaye^{V}				
Blade			Mahershala Ali^{C}^{V}				
Druig			Barry Keoghan				
Eros Starfox			Harry Styles				
Gilgamesh			Don Lee				
Ikaris			Richard Madden				
Kingo			Kumail Nanjiani				
Kro			Bill Skarsgård^{V}				
Makkari			Lauren Ridloff				
Karun Patel			Harish Patel				
Phastos			Brian Tyree Henry				
Pip the Troll			Patton Oswalt^{V}				
Sersi			Gemma Chan				
Sprite			Lia McHugh				
Thena			Angelina Jolie				
Dane Whitman			Kit Harington				
==== Introduced in Spider-Man: No Way Home ====
P. Cleary^{MS}				Arian Moayed			
==== Introduced in Doctor Strange in the Multiverse of Madness ====
Blackagar Boltagon Black Bolt^{838}					Anson Mount		
Peggy Carter Captain Carter^{838}					Hayley Atwell		
America Chavez					Xochitl Gomez		
Clea					Charlize Theron		
Billy Maximoff^{838}					Julian Hilliard		
Tommy Maximoff^{838}					Jett Klyne		
Wanda Maximoff^{838}					Elizabeth Olsen		
Karl Mordo^{838}					Chiwetel Ejiofor		
Christine Palmer^{838}					Rachel McAdams		
Maria Rambeau Captain Marvel^{838}					Lashana Lynch		
Reed Richards^{838}					John Krasinski		
Rintrah					Adam Hugill^{V}		
Sara					Sheila Atim		
Stephen Strange Defender Strange^{617}					Benedict Cumberbatch		
Stephen Strange Sinister Strange					Benedict Cumberbatch		
Stephen Strange Supreme Strange^{838}					Benedict Cumberbatch		
Ultron^{838}					Ross Marquand^{V}		
Charles Xavier^{838}					Patrick Stewart		
==== Introduced in Thor: Love and Thunder ====
Axl Heimdallson						Kieron L. Dyer	
Bast						Akosia Sabet	
Dionysus						Simon Russell Beale	
Elaine Foster						Chloé Gouneau	
Gorr the God Butcher						Christian Bale	
Hercules						Brett Goldstein	
Darryl Jacobson						Daley Pearson (Note: Pearson first portrayed the role in Marvel Studios' Team Thor short film series.)	
Jademurai						Kuni Hashimoto	
Love^{6}						India Rose Hemsworth	
Minerva						Carmen Foon	
Rapu						Jonathan Brugh	
Yakan						Stephen Curry	
Zeus						Russell Crowe	
==== Introduced in Black Panther: Wakanda Forever ====
Aneka							Michaela Coel
Attuma^{6}							Alex Livinalli
Fen							María Mercedes Coroy
Graham							Lake Bell
Namor^{6}							Tenoch Huerta Mejía Manuel Chavez^{Y}
Namora^{6}							Mabel Cadena
Smitty							Robert John Burke
T'Challa II / Toussaint							Divine Love Konadu-Sun
Riri Williams^{MS}							Dominique Thorne

=== Phase Five ===
List indicators
This section includes characters who have appeared in films in the Phase.
- A dark grey cell indicates the character was not in the film.
- A ^{6} indicates the character reappears in a Phase Six film.
- An ^{A} indicates an appearance through archival footage.
- A ^{C} indicates an uncredited cameo role.
- A ^{DS} indicates the character appears in a digital series.
- An ^{MS} indicates the character appears in a Marvel Studios television series.
- An ^{MT} indicates the character appears in a Marvel Television series.
- An ^{OS} indicates the character appears in a One-Shot.
- An ^{SP} indicates the character appears in a Marvel Studios Special Presentation.
- A ^{V} indicates a voice-only role.
- A ^{Y} indicates a younger version of the character.

Character	2023			2024	2025	
Character	Ant-Man and the Wasp: Quantumania	Guardians of the Galaxy Vol. 3	The Marvels	Deadpool & Wolverine	Captain America: Brave New World	Thunderbolts*
==== Introduced in prior Marvel media ====
Blind Al (Note: First appeared in Deadpool (2016).)				Leslie Uggams		
John Allerdyce Pyro (Note: First appeared in X2 (2003).)				Aaron Stanford		
Eric Brooks Blade (Note: First appeared in Blade (1998).)				Wesley Snipes		
Buck				Randal Reeder		
Vanessa Carlysle				Morena Baccarin		
Dopinder				Karan Soni		
Laura X-23 (Note: First appeared in Logan (2017).)				Dafne Keen		
Elektra Natchios (Note: First appeared in Daredevil (2003).)				Jennifer Garner		
Negasonic Teenage Warhead				Brianna Hildebrand		
Piotr Rasputin Colossus				Stefan Kapičić^{V}		
Rusty Shatterstar (Note: First appeared in Deadpool 2 (2018).)				Lewis Tan		
Sabretooth (Note: First appeared in X-Men (2000).)				Tyler Mane		
Johnny Storm Human Torch (Note: First appeared in Fantastic Four (2005).)				Chris Evans		
Wade Wilson Deadpool (Note: First appeared in X-Men Origins: Wolverine (2009).)				Ryan Reynolds		
Peter Wisdom				Rob Delaney		
Yukio				Shioli Kutsuna		
==== Introduced in The Infinity Saga ====
Ayesha		Elizabeth Debicki				
James "Bucky" Barnes Winter Soldier^{6} ^{MS}					Sebastian Stan^{C}	Sebastian Stan
Broker		Christopher Fairbank				
Cosmo the Spacedog^{SP}		Maria Bakalova				
Darren Cross M.O.D.O.K.^{DS}	Corey Stoll					
Dale	Gregg Turkington					
Carol Danvers Captain Marvel^{MS}			Brie Larson			
Drax the Destroyer^{SP}		Dave Bautista				
Nick Fury^{MS} ^{MT}			Samuel L. Jackson			
Gamora (Note: This is an alternate version of the character introduced in Avengers: Endgame (2019).)		Zoe Saldaña				
Groot^{SP}		Vin Diesel^{V}				
Harold "Happy" Hogan				Jon Favreau		
Howard the Duck		Seth Green^{V}				
Krugarr		Jared Gore				
Cassie Lang^{6}	Kathryn Newton Abby Ryder Fortson^{A}^{Y}					
Scott Lang Ant-Man^{6} ^{DS}	Paul Rudd					
Loki^{6} ^{MS}	Tom Hiddleston^{C}					
Mainframe		Tara Strong^{V}				
Mantis^{SP}		Pom Klementieff				
Martinex		Michael Rosenbaum				
Nebula^{SP}		Karen Gillan				
Kraglin Obfonteri^{SP}		Sean Gunn				
Stakar Ogord		Sylvester Stallone				
Hank Pym	Michael Douglas					
Jason Quill		Gregg Henry				
Peter Quill Star-Lord^{SP}		Chris Pratt				
Maria Rambeau			Lashana Lynch			
Monica Rambeau^{MS}			Teyonah Parris			
Rocket Raccoon^{SP}		Bradley Cooper^{V} Sean Gunn^{MC}				
Betty Ross					Liv Tyler	
Thaddeus Ross Red Hulk					Harrison Ford	
Ava Starr Ghost^{6}						Hannah John-Kamen
Samuel Sterns					Tim Blake Nelson	
Thor^{6} ^{OS}				Chris Hemsworth^{A}		
Yondu Udonta^{SP}		Michael Rooker				
Valkyrie			Tessa Thompson			
Hope van Dyne Wasp	Evangeline Lilly					
Janet van Dyne	Michelle Pfeiffer					
Sam Wilson Captain America^{6} ^{MS}					Anthony Mackie	
Jimmy Woo^{MS}	Randall Park					
==== Introduced in Phase Four ====
Valentina Allegra de Fontaine^{MS}						Julia Louis-Dreyfus
Yelena Belova^{6} ^{MS}						Florence Pugh Violet McGraw^{Y}
Kate Bishop^{MS}			Hailee Steinfeld			
Isaiah Bradley^{MS}					Carl Lumbly	
Bzermikitokolok^{SP}		Rhett Miller				
Antonia Dreykov Taskmaster						Olga Kurylenko
Aamir Khan^{MS}			Saagar Shaikh			
Kamala Khan Ms. Marvel^{MS}			Iman Vellani			
Muneeba Khan^{MS}			Zenobia Shroff			
Yusuf Khan^{MS}			Mohan Kapur			
Mobius M. Mobius^{MS}	Owen Wilson^{C}					
Hunter B-15^{MS}				Wunmi Mosaku		
Alexei Shostakov Red Guardian^{6}						David Harbour
Steemie^{SP}		Stephen Blackehart				
Joaquin Torres Falcon^{6} ^{MS}					Danny Ramirez	
John Walker U.S. Agent^{6} ^{MS}						Wyatt Russell
Olivia Walker^{MS}						Gabrielle Byndloss
==== Introduced in Ant-Man and the Wasp: Quantumania ====
Council of Kangs	Jonathan Majors^{C}					
Immortus	Jonathan Majors^{C}					
Jentorra	Katy O'Brian					
Kang the Conqueror	Jonathan Majors					
Krylar	Bill Murray					
Quaz	William Jackson Harper					
Rama-Tut	Jonathan Majors^{C}					
Centurion	Jonathan Majors^{C}					
Victor Timely^{MS}	Jonathan Majors^{C}					
Veb	David Dastmalchian^{V}					
Xolum	Jamie Andrew Cutler					
==== Introduced in Guardians of the Galaxy Vol. 3 ====
Blurp		Dee Bradley Baker^{V}				
Floor		Mikaela Hoover^{V}				
High Evolutionary		Chukwudi Iwuji				
Karja		Nathan Fillion				
Kwol		Jennifer Holland				
Lylla		Linda Cardellini^{V}				
Phyla		Kai Zen				
Teefs		Asim Chaudhry^{V}				
Theel		Nico Santos				
Ura		Daniela Melchior				
Vim		Miriam Shor				
Adam Warlock		Will Poulter				
War Pig		Judy Greer^{V}				
==== Introduced in The Marvels ====
Dag			Abraham Popoola			
Dar-Benn			Zawe Ashton			
Dro'ge			Gary Lewis			
Hank McCoy Beast^{6}			Kelsey Grammer			
Maria Rambeau Binary			Lashana Lynch^{C}			
Talia			Leila Farzad			
Ty-Rone			Daniel Ings			
Yan			Park Seo-joon			
==== Introduced in Deadpool & Wolverine ====
Arclight				Jessica Walker^{C}		
Azazel				Eduardo Gago Munoz^{C}		
Babypool				Olin Reynolds		
Blob				Mike Waters		
Bullseye				Curtis Small^{C}		
Callisto				Chloe Kibble^{C}		
Canadapool				Alex Kyshkovych		
"Cavillrine"				Henry Cavill		
Cowboypool				Matthew McConaughey^{V}		
Haroldpool				Harry Holland^{C}		
Headpool				Nathan Fillion^{V}		
James "Logan" Howlett Wolverine				Hugh Jackman (Note: Jackman also portrays six other versions of Wolverine in the film.)		
Juggernaut				Aaron W. Reed		
Kidpool				Inez Reynolds		
Lady Deathstrike				Jade Lye^{C}		
Ladypool				Christiaan Bettridge Blake Lively^{V}		
Remy LeBeau Gambit^{6}				Channing Tatum		
Nicepool				Ryan Reynolds		
Cassandra Nova				Emma Corrin		
Mr. Paradox				Matthew Macfadyen		
Psylocke				Ayesha Hussain^{C}		
Mary Puppins Dogpool				Peggy		
Quill				Nilly Cetin^{C}		
Ralph^{6}				James Dryden		
Roninpool				Hung Dante Dong^{C}		
The Russian				Billy Clements^{C}		
Toad				Daniel Medina Ramos^{C}		
Welshpool				Paul Mullin		
Zenpool				Kevin Fortin^{C}		
==== Introduced in Captain America: Brave New World ====
Ruth Bat-Seraph					Shira Haas	
Copperhead					Jóhannes Haukur Jóhannesson	
Dennis Dunphy					William Mark McCullough	
Leila Taylor					Xosha Roquemore	
Ozaki					Takehiro Hira	
Seth Voelker Sidewinder					Giancarlo Esposito	
==== Introduced in Thunderbolts* ====
Gary						Wendell Pierce
Holt						Chris Bauer
Mel						Geraldine Viswanathan
Bob Reynolds Sentry / Void^{6}						Lewis Pullman

=== Phase Six ===
List indicators
This section includes characters who will appear or have appeared in films in the Phase.
- A dark grey cell indicates the character was not in the film, or that the character's presence has not yet been confirmed.
- A ^{DS} indicates the character appears in a digital series.
- An ^{MS} indicates the character appears in a Marvel Studios television series.
- An ^{MT} indicates the character appears in a Marvel Television series.
- An ^{OS} indicates the character appears in a One-Shot.
- An ^{SP} indicates the character appears in a Marvel Studios Special Presentation.
- A ^{V} indicates a voice-only role.

Character	2025	2026			2027
Character	The Fantastic Four: First Steps (Note: The characters introduced in The Fantastic Four: First Steps are from Earth-828.)	Spider-Man: Brand New Day	Avengers Endgame: Encore (Note: Only actors appearing in new footage from the Encore re-release of Avengers: Endgame.)	Avengers: Doomsday	Avengers: Secret Wars
==== Introduced in The Infinity Saga ====
Bruce Banner Hulk^{MS} ^{OS}		Mark Ruffalo	Mark Ruffalo	Mark Ruffalo	
James "Bucky" Barnes Winter Soldier^{MS}				Sebastian Stan	
Peggy Carter^{MT} ^{OS}			Hayley Atwell	Hayley Atwell	Hayley Atwell
Nick Fury^{MS} ^{MT}					Samuel L. Jackson
Mac Gargan Scorpion		Michael Mando			
Michelle "MJ" Jones-Watson		Zendaya			
Cassie Lang				Kathryn Newton	
Scott Lang Ant-Man^{DS}				Paul Rudd	
Ned Leeds^{DS}		Jacob Batalon			
Loki^{MS}			Tom Hiddleston	Tom Hiddleston	
M'Baku				Winston Duke	
May Parker		Marisa Tomei			
Peter Parker Spider-Man^{DS}		Tom Holland		Tom Holland	
Steve Rogers			Chris Evans	Chris Evans	Chris Evans
Shuri Black Panther				Letitia Wright	Letitia Wright
Ava Starr Ghost				Hannah John-Kamen	
Stephen Strange				Benedict Cumberbatch	Benedict Cumberbatch
Thor^{OS}				Chris Hemsworth	
Vision					Paul Bettany
Sam Wilson Captain America^{MS}				Anthony Mackie	Anthony Mackie
Wong^{MS}				Benedict Wong	
==== Introduced in Marvel Television series ====
Frank Castle Punisher^{MS} ^{SP}		Jon Bernthal			
Claire Temple		Rosario Dawson (Note: Dawson appears in the extended version of Spider-Man: Brand New Day, subtitled [Brand New] Brand New Day.)			
==== Introduced in Phase Four ====
Attuma				Alex Livinalli	
Yelena Belova Black Widow^{MS}		Florence Pugh		Florence Pugh	Florence Pugh
Casey^{MS}			Eugene Cordero^{C}		
Love				India Rose Hemsworth	
Miss Minutes^{MS}			Tara Strong^{C}^{V}		
Mobius M. Mobius^{MS}			Owen Wilson^{C}		
Namor				Tenoch Huerta Mejía	
Namora				Mabel Cadena	
Alexei Shostakov Red Guardian				David Harbour	
Joaquin Torres Falcon^{MS}				Danny Ramirez	
John Walker U.S. Agent^{MS}				Wyatt Russell	
Xu Shang-Chi				Simu Liu	Simu Liu
==== Introduced in Phase Five ====
Remy LeBeau Gambit				Channing Tatum	
Hank McCoy Beast				Kelsey Grammer	
Ouroboros^{MS}			Ke Huy Quan^{C}		
Ralph			James Dryden^{C}		
Bob Reynolds Sentry				Lewis Pullman	
Sheila Rivera^{MS}		Zabryna Guevara			
==== Introduced in The Fantastic Four: First Steps ====
Harvey Elder Mole Man	Paul Walter Hauser				
Galactus	Ralph Ineson				
Ted Gilbert	Mark Gatiss				
Ben Grimm The Thing	Ebon Moss-Bachrach			Ebon Moss-Bachrach	Ebon Moss-Bachrach
Carolyn Haynes	Rebecca Staab				
H.E.R.B.I.E.	Matthew Wood^{V}			TBA	
Lynne Nichols	Sarah Niles				
Power Plant Worker #1	Jay Underwood				
Power Plant Worker #2	Michael Bailey Smith				
Franklin Richards	Ada Scott			TBA	
Reed Richards Mister Fantastic	Pedro Pascal			Pedro Pascal	Pedro Pascal
Rachel Rozman	Natasha Lyonne				
William Russell	Alex Hyde-White				
Shalla-Bal Silver Surfer	Julia Garner				
Johnny Storm Human Torch	Joseph Quinn			Joseph Quinn	Joseph Quinn
Susan Storm Invisible Woman	Vanessa Kirby			Vanessa Kirby	Vanessa Kirby
Victor von Doom Doctor Doom^{MS}	Robert Downey Jr.^{C}		Robert Downey Jr.^{C}	Robert Downey Jr.	Robert Downey Jr.
==== Introduced in Spider-Man: Brand New Day ====
Boomerang		Aidan Kennedy			
Cindy		Shannon Young Cho			
Jean DeWolff		Liza Colón-Zayas			
E.V.		Naomi Watts^{V}			
Jean Grey		Sadie Sink			Sadie Sink
Sara Grey		Olivia Booth-Ford			
Lonnie Lincoln Tombstone		Marvin Jones III			
Bill Metzger		Tramell Tillman			
Paul		Eman Esfandi			
Ramrod		Billy Clements			
Snow		Fan Xiaoshuang			
==== Introduced in Avengers: Doomsday ====
Raven Darkhölme Mystique				Rebecca Romijn	
Erik Lehnsherr Magneto				Ian McKellen	
Scott Summers Cyclops				James Marsden	
Kurt Wagner Nightcrawler				Alan Cumming	
Charles Xavier Professor X				Patrick Stewart	
==== Introduced in Avengers: Secret Wars ====
Johnny Blaze Ghost Rider					Ryan Gosling

== The Mutant Saga ==
=== Phase Seven ===
List indicators

This section includes characters who will appear in films in the Phase.

- A dark grey cell indicates the character's presence in the film has not yet been announced.
- An ^{MS} indicates the character appears in a Marvel Studios television series.

Character	2028		
Character	Untitled X-Men film	Ghost Rider	Black Panther III
==== Introduced in The Infinity Saga ====
M'Baku			Winston Duke
Shuri Black Panther			Letitia Wright
==== Introduced in The Multiverse Saga ====
Johnny Blaze Ghost Rider		Ryan Gosling	
Jean Grey	Sadie Sink		
Mephisto ^{MS}		Sacha Baron Cohen	
T'Challa II / Toussaint Black Panther			David Jonsson
==== Introduced in the untitled X-Men film ====
Emma Frost	Samara Weaving		
Nathaniel Milbury Mister Sinister	Adam Driver		
Ororo Munroe Storm	Maya Boyd		
Rogue	Inde Navarrette		
Scott Summers Cyclops	Kit Connor		
Warren Worthington III Angel	Asa Germann		
Charles Xavier Professor X	Christopher Abbott		

== Future ==
List indicators

This section includes characters who will appear in films in the future.

- A dark grey cell indicates the character's presence in the film has not yet been announced.
- An ^{MS} indicates the character appears in a Marvel Studios television series.

Character	TBA	
Character	Armor Wars	Untitled Shang-Chi and the Legend of the Ten Rings sequel
=== Introduced in The Infinity Saga ===
Sonny Burch	Walton Goggins	
James "Rhodey" Rhodes War Machine	Don Cheadle	
=== Introduced in The Multiverse Saga ===
Riri Williams Ironheart^{MS}	Dominique Thorne	
Xu Shang-Chi		Simu Liu

== See also ==
- Marvel One-Shot actors
- Marvel Studios television series actors
- WHIH Newsfront actors
- The Daily Bugle actors
- Marvel Television series actors
- Stan Lee cameos
