= Fidos Award =

UK entertainment award

- Awarded for: Excellence dog performance in films
- Date: October 28, 2007; 18 years ago
- Location: London
- Country: England
- Website: https://www.fidoawards.com

The FIDOS, or For Incredible Dogs On Screen Award, is a film awards ceremony in the UK founded by Toby Rose. It honors dogs' performances and acknowledges their skills in movies (live or animated). The Palm Dog Award, a related event created by Rose in 2001, takes place at the Cannes Film Festival in France and is considered the sister award to the FIDOS. These awards were created in honor of Rose's late Fox Terrier, Mutt.

== History ==
Toby Rose, a cinema journalist, established the Fido Awards in 2007. The inaugural ceremony was held at the BFI on the South Bank in London during The Times London Film Festival on October 28, 2007.The event has since been moved to March.

The Guardian has described the FIDOS as "the canine Oscars". and as The Observer put it, "the Fidos may well be the 'best in show'." “These little chaps were a pleasure to work with and deserve all the plaudits for their fine performances,” said Dame Helen Mirren, speaking of the FIDOS’ inaugural winners.

== Jury ==
The 2025 FIDO Awards jury comprised film journalists and critics:

- Wendy Mitchell — Editor-at-large, Screen International; author of Citizen Canine.
- Anna Smith — Metro journalist and film critic (Girls on Film podcast).
- Kaleem Aftab — Freelance film writer.
- Rita di Santo — Film writer and reviewer.

The jury was chaired by Toby Rose, founder of the Palm Dog and FIDO Awards.

== Fido Awards collars ==
Like the Palm Dog Award, the Fidos Award also consists of a leather dog collar. However, unlike the Palm Dog Award, the collars shows the name of each category instead of the term "PALM DOG". In 2021, the documentaries, Stray and The Truffle Hunters were the joint winners for the Dog Dox and the Best in World categories.

=== Motion Picture categories ===
- Best in World: Since 2007
- Blockbuster Bowser: Since 2007
- Comedy Canine: Since 2007
- Cupcake Cinema for dogs in a short film: 2007 Only
- Dog Dox: 2021 Only
- Dogs Trust Star Of Tomorrow: 2009 Only
- Festival Fido for film at LFF: 2007 Only
- Fi-Dogumentary: 2018 Only
- FiDogManitarian: Since 2020
- Historical Hound: Since 2007
- Mutt Moment: Since 2008
- Palm Dog USA: 2018 to 2019
- Rom Com Rover: Since 2008
- Special Jury Prize: 2011 Only
- Futuristic Fido: 2022 Only

== Ceremonies ==
=== Winners and nominees ===
Winners are in bold.

2007 Awards
Historical Hound
- **The Queen**
  - Control
  - Molière
Comedy Canine
- **Year of the Dog**
  - The Holiday
  - Feast of Love
Cupcake Cinema for dogs in a short film
- **Dog Flap**
  - Dog Altogether
Festival Fido for film at LFF
- **Far North**
Block Buster Bowser
- **Shooter**
  - The Savages
  - Shoot ‘em Up
Best in World
- **The Queen**

2008 Awards
Historical Hound
- **East Virtue**
  - Charlie Wilson's War
  - The Duchess
Comedy Canine
- **St Trinian's**
  - How to Lose Friends and Alienate People
  - Fred Claus
Mutt Moment
- **What Just Happened**
  - Flashbacks of a Fool
  - Blindness
Rom Com Rover
- **Sex and the City**
  - High School Musical 3: Senior Year
  - Made of Honor
Block Buster Bowser
- **I am Legend**
  - Incredible Hulk
  - American Gangster
Best in World
- **St Trinian's**

2009 Awards
Historical Hound
- **The Young Victoria**
  - Dean Spanley
  - Taking Woodstock
  - W.
Comedy Canine
- **Beverly Hills Chihuahua**
  - Whatever Works
  - Hotel for Dogs
  - Bolt
Mutt Moment
- **Fish Tank**
  - Wendy and Lucy
  - Let the Right One In
  - Sleep Furiously
Rom Com Rover
- **Marley and Me**
  - The Proposal
  - My Best Friend's Girlfriend
  - I Love You, Man
Block Buster Bowser
- **Up**
  - Gran Torino
  - Inglourious Basterds
  - Coraline
Dogs Trust Star Of Tomorrow
- **Paddy (a six-year-old crossbreed rescue dog from Dogs Trust Darlington)**
Best in World
- **The Young Victoria**

2010 Awards
Historical Hound
- **Hachiko A Dog's Story**
  - A Single Man
  - The Immortal
Comedy Canine
- Toy Story 3
- Marmaduke
- Due Date
Mutt Moment
- Precious
- Winter's Bone
- Greenberg
Rom Com Rover
- **Tamara Drewe**
Block Buster Bowser
- Robin Hood
- Wall Street 2
- Sherlock Holmes
Best in World
- **Tamara Drewe**

2011 Awards
Historical Hound
- **The King's Speech**
  - Midnight in Paris
  - Tinker Tailor Soldier Spy
Comedy Canine
- **The Guard**
  - Bridesmaids
  - 3
Mutt Moment
- **Rise of the Planet of the Apes**
  - Tyrannosaur
  - Le Quattro Volte
Rom Com Rover
- **Beginners**
  - Submarine
  - I Don't Know How She Does It
Block Buster Bowser
- **The Adventures of TinTin**
  - Paul
  - Rabbit Hole
Special Jury Prize
- **Rupture** - Hugh Hudson
Best in World
- **The Adventures of TinTin**

2012 Awards
Historical Hound
- **The Artist**
  - Hugo Cabret
  - The Woman in Black
Comedy Canine
- **Sightseers**
  - Le Grand Soir
  - Young Adult
Mutt Moment
- **Frankenweenie**
  - Moonrise Kingdom
  - Le Havre
Rom Com Rover
- **Red Dog**
  - The Lucky One
  - Ruby Sparks
Block Buster Bowser
- **Seven Psychopaths**
  - J. Edgar
  - The Campaign
Best in World
- **Sightseers**

2013 Awards
Historical Hound
- **The Great Gatsby**
  - Rush
  - The Butler
Comedy Canine
- **We’re the Millers**
  - The Heat
  - Small Apartments
Mutt Moment
- **How I Live Now**
  - The Place Beyond the Pines
  - Pain & Gain
Rom Com Rover
- **The Bling Ring**
  - Behind the Candelabra
  - The Big Wedding
Block Buster Bowser
- **Gravity**
  - Man of Steel
  - Broken City
Best in World
- **Gravity**

2014 Awards
Historical Hound
- **A Million Ways to Die in the West**
  - Grand Budapest Hotel
  - The Wolf of Wall Street
Comedy Canine
- **Anchorman 2: The Legend Continues**
  - Pudsey the Movie
  - Paddington
Mutt Moment
- **Calvary**
  - Tracks
  - Joe
Rom Com Rover
- **The Secret Life of Walter Mitty**
  - Sex Tape
  - The Other Woman
Block Buster Bowser
- **The Drop**
  - Lucy
  - Guardians of the Galaxy
Best in World
- **The Drop**

2015\16 Awards
Historical Hound
- **The Danish Girl**
  - Far From the Madding Crowd
  - Saint Laurent
Comedy Canine
- **Absolutely Anything**
  - The Interview
Mutt Moment
- **The Voices**
  - Love and Mercy
  - Joy
  - The Peanuts Movie
Rom Com Rover
- **The Lobster**
  - She's Funny That Way
  - Gemma Bovery
Block Buster Bowser
- **White God**
  - Kingsmen
  - John Wick
Best in World
- **The Voices**

2017 Awards
Historical Hound
- **Hail Caesar**
  - Florence Foster Jenkins
  - Snowden
  - Fantastic Beasts
Comedy Canine
- **Weiner Dog**
  - Toni Erdmann
  - War Dogs
Mutt Moment
- **BFG**
  - Hunt for the Wilderpeople
  - A Street Cat Named Bob
Rom Com Rover
- **Bad Moms**
  - Paterson
  - The Secret Life of Pets
Block Buster Bowser
- **Eye in the Sky**
  - The Nice Guys
  - Triple 9
Best in World
- **Weiner Dog**

2018 Awards
Historical Hound
- **Their Finest**
  - The Death of Stalin
  - Viceroy's House
Comedy Canine
- **Coco**
  - Whisky Galore
  - Going in Style
Mutt Moment
- **The Square**
  - Certain Women
  - The Other Side of Hope
Rom Com Rover
- **Red Dog True Blue**
  - Wilson
  - A Dog's Purpose
Fi-Dogumentary
- **Isle of Dogs** (Wes Anderson)
Block Buster Bowser
- **Bladerunner 2049**
  - Spiderman: Homecoming
  - Valerian
Palm Dog USA
- **Bladerunner 2049**
Best in World
- **Red Dog True Blue**

2019 Awards
Historical Hound
- **Colette**
  - Roma
  - The Favourite
Comedy Canine
- **Paddington 2**
  - Nativity Rocks
  - Patrick
Mutt Moment
- **Dogman**
  - A Star is Born
  - Dog Days
Rom Com Rover
- **Isle of Dogs**
  - Love, Simon
  - Dusty and Me
Fi-Dogmanitarian
- **The Wild at Heart Foundation**
Block Buster Bowser
- **The Meg**
  - Crazy Rich Asians
  - Widows
Palm Dog USA
- **A Star is Born**
Best in World
- **Isle of Dogs**

2020 Awards
Historical Hound
- **The Personal History of David Copperfield**
  - Downton Abbey
  - Judy & Punch
Comedy Canine
- **Farmageddon: A Shaun the Sheep Movie**
  - The Queen's Corgi
  - Playing with Fire
Mutt Moment
- **Greener Grass**
  - A Dog's Journey
  - The Art of Racing in The Rain
Rom Com Rover
- **Little Joe**
  - The Farewell
  - Hope Gap
Block Buster Bowser
- **Call of the Wild**
  - Once Upon a Time in Hollywood
  - John Wick 3
FIDOgManitarian
- **Medical Detection Dogs**
Best in World
- **Little Joe**

2021 Awards
Historical Hound
- **United States Vs Billie Holiday**
  - Rebecca
  - Space Dogs
Comedy Canine
- **One Way to Denmark**
  - Soul
  - Think Like a Dog
Dog Dox
- **Stray** & **The Truffle Hunters**
  - I Am Greta
Mutt Moment
- **Nomadland**
  - Sound of Metal
  - The Human Voice
Rom Com Rover
- **23 Walks**
  - Freshman Year (aka Shithouse)
  - Lady and the Tramp
Block Buster Bowser
- **Spenser Confidential**
  - Love and Monsters
  - Honest Thief
Palm Dog USA
- **Two Distant Strangers**
FiDogManitarian
- **Save Ralph**
Best in World
- **Stray** & **The Truffle Hunters**

2022 Awards
Historical Hound
- **Laika**
  - House of Gucci
  - Spencer
Comedy Canine
- **The Phantom of the Open**
  - Clifford the Big Red Dog
  - Dogtanian and the Three Muskehounds
Mutt Moment
- **The** **Power of the Dog**
  - Don't Look Up
  - Lamb
Rom Com Rover
- **A Castle for Christmas**
  - Souvenir Part 2
  - Red Rocket
Block Buster Bowser
- **Dog**
  - Ghostbusters Afterlife
  - Spider-Man No Way Home
FiDogManitarian
- **Gavin Guest and Eli the West Siberian Laika**
Futuristic Fido
- **Finch**
Best in World
- **Dog**

2023 Awards
Historical Hound
- **Lady Chatterley's Lover**
  - Miss Harris Goes to PARIS
  - Downton Abbey: A New Era
  - Elvis
Comedy Canine
- **Banshees of Inisherin**
  - Paws of Fury: The Legend of Hank
  - DC League of Super-Pets
Mutt Moment
- **Everything Everywhere All at Once**
  - Bones and All
  - Spencer
Rom Com Rover
- **Rescued by Ruby**
  - Heart Parade
  - The Noel Diary
FiDogManitarian
- **Kean Cao, founder of the upcoming International Animal Future Film Festival**
Block Buster Bowser
- **Cocaine Bear**
- John Wick: Chapter 4
- Top Gun: Maverick
Best in World
- **Banshees of Inisherin**

2024 Awards
Historical Hound
- **Napoleon**
  - Priscilla
  - The Zone of Interest
Comedy Canine
- **Poor Things**
  - Meg 2
  - Strays
Mutt Moment
- **Anatomy of a Fall**
  - The Eternal Daughter
  - The Old Oak
Rom Com Rover
- **Barbie**
  - Park Dogs
  - The Old Oak
Block Buster Bowser
- **Guardians of the Galaxy Vol. 3**
  - The Little Mermaid
  - Wonka
FiDogManitarian
- **Bruce Oldfield for Camilla's Coronation Dress embroidered with her rescue bowsers Bluebell and Beth - both Jack Russells**
Best in World
- **Anatomy of a Fall**

2025 Awards
Historical Hound
- **I’m Still Here**
  - Maria
  - The Apprentice
Comedy Canine
- **Deadpool & Wolverine**
  - Wallace and Gromit: Vengeance Most Fowl
  - DogMan
Mutt Moment
- **Babygirl**
  - Wicked
  - Black Dog
Rom Com Rover
- **Bridget Jones: Mad About The Boy**
  - Our Little Secret
  - Prom Dates
Block Buster Bowser
- **The Fall Guy**
  - Inside Out 2
  - Red One
FiDogManitarian
- **Therapy Dogs Nationwide, a charity where volunteers take their own dogs into schools, nursing homes and hospitals to provide comfort and stimulation.**
Best in World
- **Peggy from** **Deadpool & Wolverine**
