= Ceechynaa =

British rapper (born 2003)

- Born: Chelsea Odosamamwen Ode; 29 December 2003 (age 22); London, England
- Origin: Essex, England
- Genre: UK drill
- Occupation: Rapper
- Years active: 2022–present

Chelsea Odosamamwen Ode (born 29 December 2003), known professionally as Ceechynaa, is a British drill rapper based in Essex. Her songs are characterized by sexually dominant lyrics, which often target men and gender stereotypes.

Ceechynaa debuted in 2022 with the song "Legal Baby" and released her next single, "Last Laugh", the subsequent year. The latter, as well as her following single "Peggy" (2024), achieved viral popularity on social media. "Peggy" became her first entry on the UK singles chart, debuting at No. 79.

== Life and career ==
Chelsea Odosamamwen Ode was born on 29 December 2003 in South London to Nigerian parents. She first began writing music at age 14 after attending a studio session with friends, where she was encouraged by the producer to pursue music. At age 15, she gave a speech on beauty standards, during which she took off her false eyelashes and wig to show the "real" her. Videos of the speech later went viral online. Prior to starting her rap career, she was a waitress and worked in retail. She also attended college where studying a media makeup course before choosing to focus on her music career.

Chelsea independently released her debut single as Ceechynaa, "Legal Baby", in 2022. Her follow-up single, "Last Laugh", was released in July 2023 and went viral online, including on TikTok. The associated music video for "Last Laugh" featured her walking through Leicester Square and brought the song to further popularity, while a remix of the song featuring NLE Choppa was released in January the following year. She also performed with Tion Wayne at Reading Festival and appeared on the cover of Dazed in 2023. She took a break from music the following year until releasing the single "Peggy" in December 2024. It became her first entry on the UK Singles Chart, debuting at number 79, while a verse from the song became popular online. As of 2024, she is based in Essex. Following the track's release, she was interviewed for Vogue; shortly afterward, she left the industry to focus on honing her industry expertise. She was listed on Billboard's 2025 British & Irish Artists to Watch listicle.

== Musical style ==
Ceechynaa's music is primarily UK drill. She raps with an Essex accent, which Hits described as her trademark, and draws influences from witch house music. She has cited Nicki Minaj as a major inspiration.

Critics have described Ceechynaa's lyrics and delivery as domineering, provocative, and aggressive. Notion wrote that she had a "confident cadence" and "sharp wordplay", and NME's Alex Rigotti likened her musical style to that of Ivorian Doll and Shaybo. Dominance, gender and sexuality are some of the recurring themes in her songs. According to Ceechynaa, she writes songs in a way that promotes female empowerment and subverts gender stereotypes, rapping about "things that make women feel in control" such as financial domination. Kyle Denis of Billboard said that "few go as far as Ceechynaa" in "proudly waving the sexual liberation flag".

Criticisms of misogynistic tropes in hip hop appear throughout Ceechynaa's discography. In an interview with British Vogue, Ceechynaa said that due to the amount of male rappers who degraded women in their music, she wanted to make rap songs that did the same but with men. The Fader's Raphael Helfand described her as a "challenger to rap's toxic gender norms", and Daniel Rodgers of British Vogue said that her songs were "designed with the specific intention of intimidating the sort of men who perceive feminism to be harmful".

== Discography ==
List of singles, with selected chart positions
Title	Year	Peak chart positions	Album
Title	Year	UK	Album
"Legal Baby"	2022	—	Non-album singles
"Last Laugh"	2023	—	Non-album singles
"Peggy"	2024	59	Non-album singles
