= Pegging report =

A pegging report is a standard output generated by Material Requirements Planning (MRP) systems in manufacturing and supply chain management. It identifies the specific sources of demand—such as customer orders, work orders, or forecasts-that necessitate the procurement or production of lower-level components or raw materials. Pegging is used to trace dependent demand through the Bill of Materials (BOM), establishing a parent–child relationship between assemblies and their required components.

By showing which higher-level items (parents) are responsible for the demand of lower-level items (children), pegging reports provide detailed visibility into the quantity, schedule, and origin of demand for each component. This allows planners to link material requirements directly to end-use items, improving the accuracy of planning and scheduling activities.

Pegging reports are essential tools in multi-level MRP environments and are commonly used in discrete manufacturing, aerospace, automotive, and electronics industries. The information in these reports supports decision-making related to procurement, production scheduling, and Sales and Operations Planning (S&OP), particularly when managing long lead times, fluctuating demand, or constrained supply. Typical data fields include item numbers, demand source type (e.g., work order, sales order), quantities required, due dates, and priority levels.

Pegging is a key function in many Enterprise Resource Planning (ERP) systems, including those developed by SAP, Oracle, and Microsoft Dynamics. Its primary value lies in the ability to perform backward tracing of demand—tracking how each material requirement rolls up into finished goods or customer commitments—allowing organizations to manage material shortages proactively.

== See also ==
- Material Requirements Planning
- Bill of Materials
- Sales and Operations Planning
- Enterprise Resource Planning
