= Peggy (dog) =

Dog actress (born 2018)

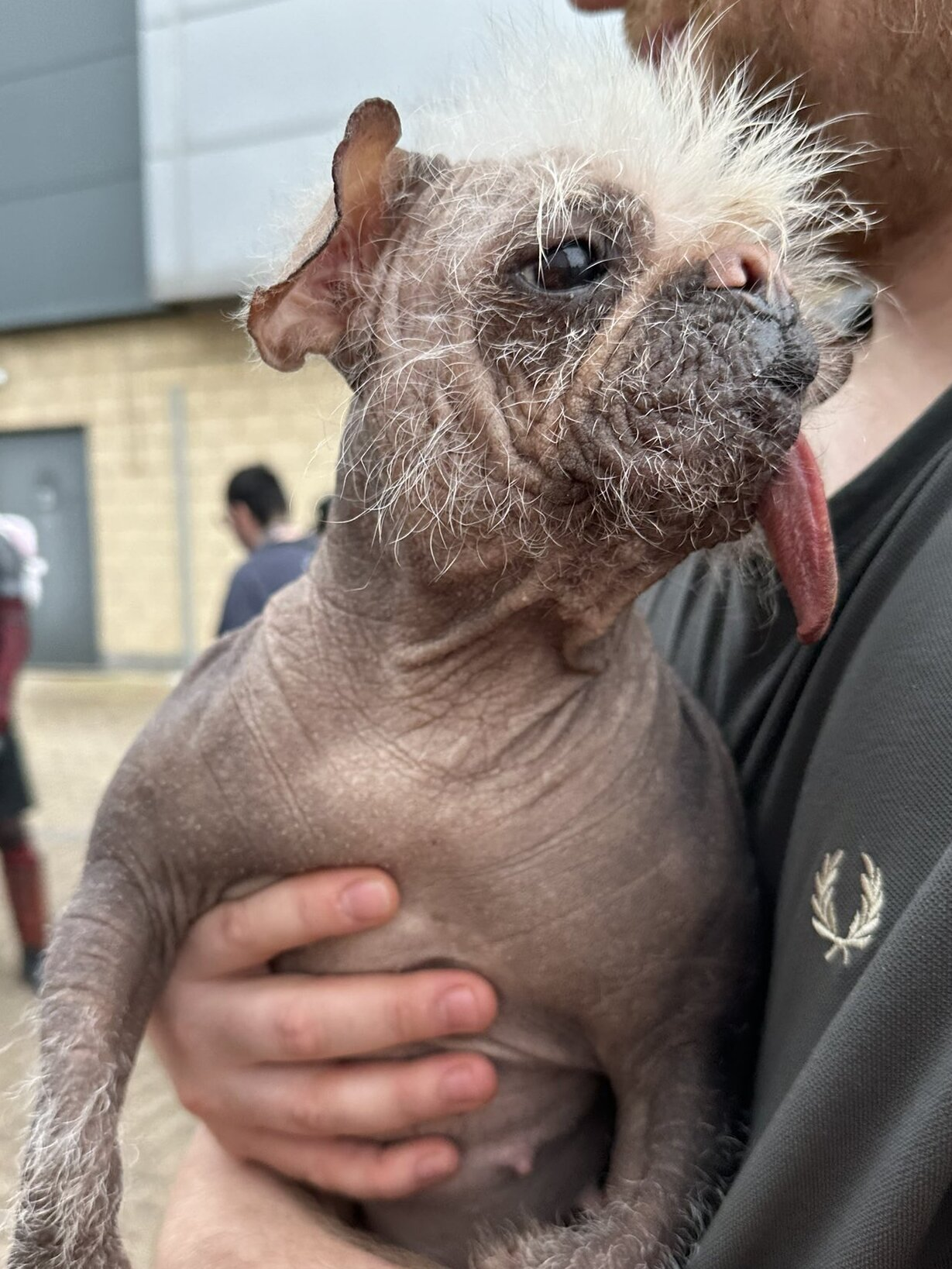
- Peggy at a fan meetup in 2024
- Species: Canis familiaris
- Breed: Pugese
- Sex: Female
- Born: 2018 (age 7–8)
- Occupation: Animal actor
- Notable role: Dogpool
- Known for: Winning the title of Britain's ugliest dog
- Owner: Holly Middleton

Peggy (born c. early 2018) is a British Pugese dog actress. Peggy was born sometime in 2018 as the runt of an accidental litter, being adopted online by Holly Middleton. Peggy achieved notice for winning the title of Britain's ugliest dog, and later made television appearances, gaining popularity for her "ugliness".

After gaining notice from Canadian actor Ryan Reynolds, Peggy made her acting debut as Dogpool in his 2024 film Deadpool & Wolverine, a role she underwent extensive training for. She won two Fidos Awards for her work on the film.

== Early life ==
Holly Middleton adopted Peggy online near the end of 2018. She was six months old at the time, and she was the runt of an accidental litter. Peggy was named after Middleton's great-grandmother. She is a cross between a Pug and a Chinese Crested Dog, also known as a Pugese. In 2023, Peggy was entered into an ugly dog competition held by a photography printing firm called ParrotPrint. She won, earning the title of "Britain's ugliest dog," and the founder of ParrotPrint described Peggy's success as "a classic rags to riches story."

== Film and television career ==
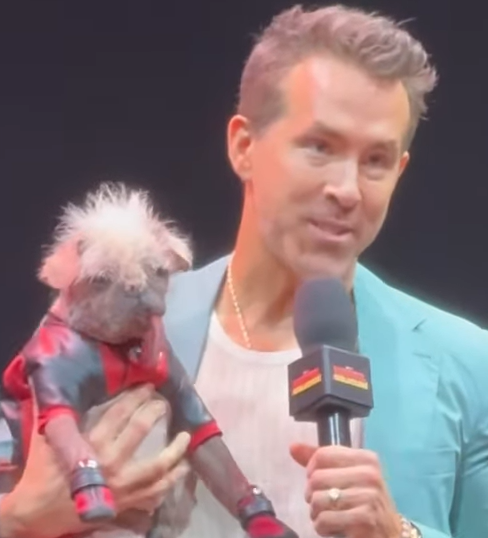
Peggy (in costume as Dogpool) and Ryan Reynolds in 2024.

Due to her success in the ugly dog competition, she appeared on television and eventually entered the film industry. She appeared on This Morning and BBC Breakfast, and later actor Ryan Reynolds posted a picture of Peggy in a Deadpool costume on social media, revealing that she would appear as an animal actor in the 2024 Marvel Cinematic Universe film Deadpool & Wolverine. Reynolds stated that he was a proponent for Peggy's inclusion in the film because "she feels like the animal manifestation of Wade Wilson."

For the film, Peggy was trained by animal trainer Jules Tottman; she had no prior training. According to Reynolds, Peggy underwent more training for the film than his co-star Hugh Jackman. Jumping into Reynolds' arms on command took about eight weeks for her to learn, and she was coaxed into licking his face with cheese. Peggy walked the red carpet with Ryan Reynolds and Hugh Jackman at the film's premiere in London. To celebrate, HMV temporarily replaced the image of Nipper on their logo with Peggy. She also began making appearances at fan events and comic conventions to meet with fans. She also appeared at the 2025 Calgary Expo to help raise awareness and money for animal charities.

In October 2024, Peggy was nominated for a Fidos Award for her work in Deadpool & Wolverine, and appeared with Fidos Awards founder Toby Rose to announce the 2025 longlist. Peggy went on to win the Comedy Canine Award and the BFI Best in World Award at the 2025 Fidos Awards. In December 2024, she appeared as a special guest on The Big Fat Quiz of the Year. Maximum Effort partnered with E & J Gallo Winery in 2025 to release a brand of boxed wine called "Ugly Estates", and Peggy served as the brand's spokesperson in an advertisement.

In 2026, Holly Middleton used Peggy to endorse and promote a petition for the UK government to allow dogs to travel in-cabin on flights entering the country.

== Filmography ==
| Year | Title | Role | Notes | Refs. |
|---|---|---|---|---|
| 2022 | This Morning | Herself (guest) | Magazine programme feature | |
| 2023 | BBC Breakfast | Herself (guest) | Breakfast television feature | |
| 2024 | Deadpool & Wolverine | Dogpool | Peggy's acting debut | |
| 2024 | The Big Fat Quiz of the Year | Herself (guest) | Panel game television feature | |

== Awards and nominations ==
| Year | Award / Festival | Category | Work | Result | Refs. |
|---|---|---|---|---|---|
| 2023 | ParrotPrint ugly dog contest | Britain's ugliest dog | —N/a | Won | |
| 2025 | Fidos Award | Comedy Canine | Deadpool & Wolverine | Won | |
| 2025 | Fidos Award | BFI Best in World | Deadpool & Wolverine | Won | |

== See also ==
- List of animal actors
- List of individual dogs
- List of Marvel Cinematic Universe film actors
