= Peggy (song) =

2024 single by Ceechynaa

Single by Ceechynaa
- Released: 5 December 2024
- Genre: UK hip-hop
- Length: 2:39
- Label: Self-released
- Songwriter: Ceechynaa
- Producers: Rupa Beats; Extendo

Ceechynaa singles chronology
"Last Laugh" (NLE Choppa Remix) (2024)	"Peggy" (2024)

Music video
- "Peggy" on YouTube

"Peggy" is a song by English rapper Ceechynaa. It was released independently on 5 December 2024 and marked her first release since the remix of her 2023 single "Last Laugh" with NLE Choppa. The UK hip-hop song and its accompanying music video gained online attention due to its provocative visuals and raunchy lyrics. "Peggy" became Ceechynaa's first entry on the UK Singles Chart. The song was published through Universal Music Group.

== Music and lyrics ==
"Peggy" was written by Ceechynaa, and co-produced by Rupa Beats with Extendo Beats. Raphael Helfand of The Fader described the song as a deviation from the UK drill beats of her previous singles for something "a bit more horrorcore, setting the stage for a brilliant, Memphis-themed hook." He also praised her for "reversing the misogyny of Juicy J's 'Half on a Sack' bar", stating that Ceechynaa "spits directly in the face of rap fans who'd rather plug their ears than let a fem MC cook." A music video was released on 9 December 2024.

== Reception ==
The song was met with positive reviews by music critics. GRM Daily praised the track, stating that the song "reaffirms her reputation as an artist unafraid to push boundaries and speak her mind, making it well worth the wait for her fans." Raphael Helfand of The Fader included "Peggy" in the magazine "Songs You Need In Your Life This Week" section saying that Ceechynaa digs in even deeper as she "cements her position as a challenger to rap's toxic gender norms." Notion called the track "a fiery anthem packed with unapologetic femme energy" and praised the track for being a "bold statement that reclaims the spotlight and keeps the boys in check." Pitchfork included the track on their December 9, 2024 Pitchfork Selects playlist. SheBOPS Zine described the song as "a no-holds-barred declaration of power" and mentioned that "Ceechynaa’s signature juxtaposition of her posh accent with explicit, empowering lyrics sets her apart, as she weaves high-class elegance with unapologetic grit."

Several lines from the track went viral, including "'Chyna, please have mercy, I ain't gettin' paid 'til the end of the week' / I don’t give a fuck, shut the fuck up / Get on your knees and grease my feet (Pussy)". Cardi B, Ellie Goulding and Charli XCX showed public support to "Peggy" making their own social media posts, with all three lip-syncing to the track.

== Charts ==
Chart performance for "Peggy"
Charts (2024–2025)	Peak position
New Zealand Hot Singles (RMNZ)	13
UK Independent Singles Chart (OCC)	11
UK Independent Singles Breakers Chart (OCC)	2
UK Hip Hop/R&B Singles Chart (OCC)	12
UK Singles (OCC)	59
