= Dogpool =

Marvel Comics superdog

- Dogpool in Prelude to Deadpool Corps #3, illustrated by Philip Bond

Publication information
- Publisher: Marvel Comics
- First appearance: Prelude to Deadpool Corps #3 (March 2010)
- Created by: Victor Gischler; Philip Bond

In-story information
- Alter ego: Wade Wilson
- Species: Canis familiaris
- Place of origin: Earth-103173
- Team affiliations: Deadpool Corps

Dogpool is a superhero dog appearing in American comic books published by Marvel Comics. He first appeared in Prelude to Deadpool Corps #3 (March 2010) and was created by writer Victor Gischler and artist Philip Bond. In the comics, he is a dog counterpart of Deadpool from the alternate universe of Earth‑103173. Originally named Wade Wilson, Dogpool gained regenerative powers after cruel experimentation, later performing in a circus before joining the Deadpool Corps. He befriends other Deadpool variants like Kidpool, though he later dies in Deadpool Kills Deadpool #1.

== Publication history ==
Dogpool first appeared in Prelude to Deadpool Corps #3, serving as a major character in it and the subsequent Deadpool Corps series of comics. This version of Dogpool made his final appearance in Deadpool Kills Deadpool #1 from 2013, wherein he is killed by a villainous alternate universe version of Deadpool.

At the 2024 San Diego Comic-Con, Marvel Comics announced a comic series created by Mackenzie Cadenhead and Enid Balám titled Dogpool, which features Dogpool alongside the debuting characters Catpool and Mousepool.

== Fictional character biography ==
Dogpool is from Earth-103173, a universe in the Marvel Multiverse. In this universe, Wilson the dog was subjected to animal testing by a cosmetics company called Babeline in a project called Mascara-X, which sought to create a product that would grant customers eternal youth. After being horribly mutated by the experiments, he was left in a dumpster to die, but eventually escaped and was recruited by a circus that saw potential in his regenerative abilities.

There, he performed death-defying tricks and adopted the name "Deadpool". He would eventually be rescued by the Deadpool of Earth-616 and join the Deadpool Corps, a superhero team composed of various versions of Deadpool from different universes. Dogpool became close friends with Kidpool, a child version of Deadpool, but would eventually be killed by an evil version of Deadpool.

== In other media ==
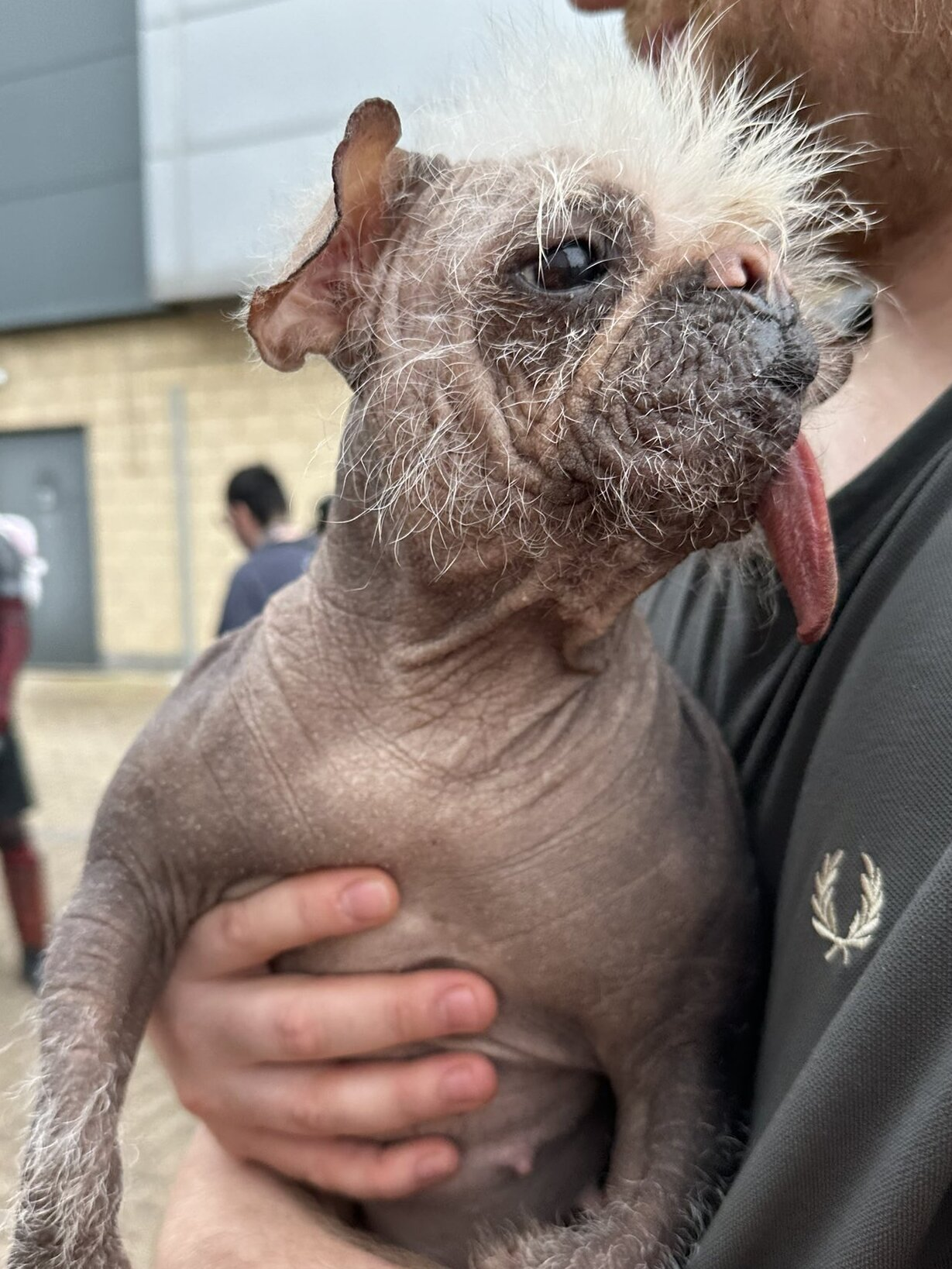
Peggy, the actress of Dogpool in Deadpool & Wolverine

A female incarnation of Dogpool appears in Deadpool & Wolverine, portrayed by dog actress Peggy. Peggy's depiction of Dogpool was popular among fans. An official Instagram account was created to host photographs of Peggy as Dogpool, which garnered over 241,000 followers at the time of the film's release. Ryan Reynolds, the actor for Deadpool, stated that he supported Peggy's inclusion in the film because "she feels like the animal manifestation of Wade Wilson".
