= Peg =

PEG or peg may refer to:

== Devices ==
- Clothes peg, a fastener used to hang up clothes for drying
- Tent peg, a spike driven into the ground for holding a tent to the ground
- Tuning peg, used to hold a string in the pegbox of a stringed instrument
- Piton, a metal spike that is driven into rock to aid climbing
- PEG tube, a medical device, that is, a percutaneous endoscopic gastrostomy tube
- Foot peg, a place to put one's foot on a vehicle such as a motorcycle

== Science and computing ==
- Pegasus (constellation), abbreviated Peg, a constellation in the northern sky
- Percutaneous endoscopic gastrostomy, a medical procedure
- Polyethylene glycol, a chemical polymer
- Parsing expression grammar, a type of formal grammar used in mathematics and computer science
- PCI Express Graphics adapter, an abbreviation commonly used in BIOS settings
- Pneumoencephalography, an obsolete medical procedure for brain imaging

== Recreation ==
- Peg, a rule in the game of backyard cricket
- Peg, a position or post in a driven hunt where a gun will stand
- Peg (fishing), an area set aside for an angler
- Peg solitaire, a board game for one player
- Pegs, pieces from the board game The Game of Life representing people
- Pinnacle Entertainment Group, a game company

== People and fictional characters ==
- Peg (nickname)
- Peg Ryan

== Codes ==
- Pegswood railway station, United Kingdom, National Rail station code PEG
- Perugia San Francesco d'Assisi – Umbria International Airport, Italy, IATA airport code PEG
- Pengo language, spoken in the Nabarangpur district of Odisha, India, ISO 639-3 code peg

== Other uses ==
- Peg (unit), an Indian measure used in preparing alcohol, from 1 to 2 fluid ounces
- PEG or PEGA channels, public, educational, and government access cable TV channels in the United States
- Peg, or fixed exchange-rate system, a system to value currencies
- PEG ratio, price/earnings to growth ratio, a stock price analysis tool
- "Peg" (song), a 1977 song by Steely Dan
- Poetae Epici Graeci, an edition of fragments of ancient Greek literature
- Producer Entertainment Group, a talent agency
- Program for the Exceptionally Gifted, a program at Mary Baldwin College
- Winnipeg, Manitoba, Canada, nicknamed "The Peg"

== See also ==
- Pegging (disambiguation)
- Pegged
