= List of Red Dead Redemption 2 characters =

Characters in the 2018 video game Red Dead Redemption 2

Red Dead Redemption 2, a Western-themed action-adventure game developed and published by Rockstar Games, follows the story of Arthur Morgan, an outlaw and member of the Van der Linde gang. Led by Dutch van der Linde, the gang attempts to survive against government forces and rival gangs while dealing with the decline of the Wild West. Several characters reprise their roles from the 2010 game Red Dead Redemption, to which Red Dead Redemption 2 is a prequel.

The game focuses on Arthur's relationship with several of the gang members, including Dutch's best friend Hosea Matthews, Native American hunter Charles Smith, gunslinger Sadie Adler, experienced outlaw Micah Bell, and Red Dead Redemption protagonist John Marston. Outside of the gang, Arthur also encounters his former partner Mary Linton, as well as Native American tribe members Rains Fall and Eagle Flies. Throughout their adventures, the gang come into direct conflict with several opposing forces, including wealthy oil magnate Leviticus Cornwall, crime lord Angelo Bronte, Dutch's nemesis Colm O'Driscoll, and Pinkerton agents Andrew Milton and Edgar Ross. The game's epilogue focuses on John's relationship with his family—wife Abigail and son Jack—as well as the elderly Uncle, leading into the events of the first game.

Rockstar used motion capture to record the performances of the cast, as well as cameras to capture their facial reactions for later animation. The secretive nature of Rockstar's development processes meant that the actors and the director were unsure of the future of the characters during production; the writers continued to work on the script while the actors shot their scenes in segments. Rockstar wanted a diverse cast of characters within the Van der Linde gang and put particular focus on the individual stories behind each character. The relationships between the characters received praise from several gaming publications, and the acting has resulted in multiple awards and nominations, including a win at The Game Awards.

== Creation and conception ==
A composite of the art designs of each member of the Van der Linde gang, which makes up the main characters of Red Dead Redemption 2. Left to right; back row: Javier, Lenny, Micah, Arthur, Dutch, John, Hosea, Charles, Bill; front row: Pearson, Uncle, Swanson, Sean, Tilly, Grimshaw, Sadie, Molly, Mary-Beth, Karen, Abigail, Jack, Strauss, Trelawny.

Red Dead Redemption 2's recording sessions began in 2013 and lasted a total of 2,200 days, led primarily by motion capture director Rod Edge. The game features 1,200 actors, 700 of whom share the game's 500,000 lines of dialogue. In addition to using motion capture to record the performances, Rockstar Games also used cameras to record their facial reactions for later animation; a total of around 60 or 70 cameras were used. The motion capture sets were typically accurate to the dimensions of the in-game setting, which could be demonstrated in a previsualization format. The secretive nature of Rockstar's development meant that Edge and the actors were unsure about the future of the characters during production; the writers continued to work on the script while the actors shot their scenes in segments.

Rockstar wanted a diverse cast of characters within the Van der Linde gang. Senior creative writer Michael Unsworth noted that the ensemble was advantageous when writing the narrative, as it helped to craft the story and added complexity to the game. The writers put particular focus on the individual stories behind each character, exploring their life before the gang and their reasons for remaining with the group. Unsworth felt that the gang is a "family" that offers "a sense of belonging and purpose", and analyzing each story—and each character's relationship with the protagonist—was important for the narrative. Several characters were cut from the game during development as their personalities failed to add to the narrative. Some lines of dialogue from the first game, Red Dead Redemption, in which gang leader Dutch van der Linde is described as an equitable leader, allowed the team to create a diverse group of characters in the gang. The developers often allowed the actors to take scenes in their own direction to develop the characters in new ways. The actors improvised some additional lines but mostly remained faithful to the script.

The team decided that the player would control one character at a time in Red Dead Redemption 2, as opposed to the three protagonists simultaneously in Rockstar's previous title Grand Theft Auto V (2013), in order to follow the character more personally and understand how the events impact him. They felt that a single character felt more appropriate for the narrative structure of a Western. Nelson felt that the decision to limit to one protagonist shaped the other creative decisions of development. The conversations and sense of life within the gang environment were inspired by Grand Theft Auto V's exploration of the lives of two of the game's playable characters while the player was controlling the other one. Rockstar wanted to grant agency to the player when experiencing the story of Arthur Morgan; Unsworth noted that Arthur is neither controlled by the storytellers or by the player, but by "a delicate push and pull between the two". The team attempted to give the player more freedom with Arthur's relationship with other characters; when the narrative begins, Arthur has already formed relationships with the other gang members, so the team aimed to develop them in a way for the player to respond appropriately.

== Van der Linde gang ==
=== Dutch van der Linde ===
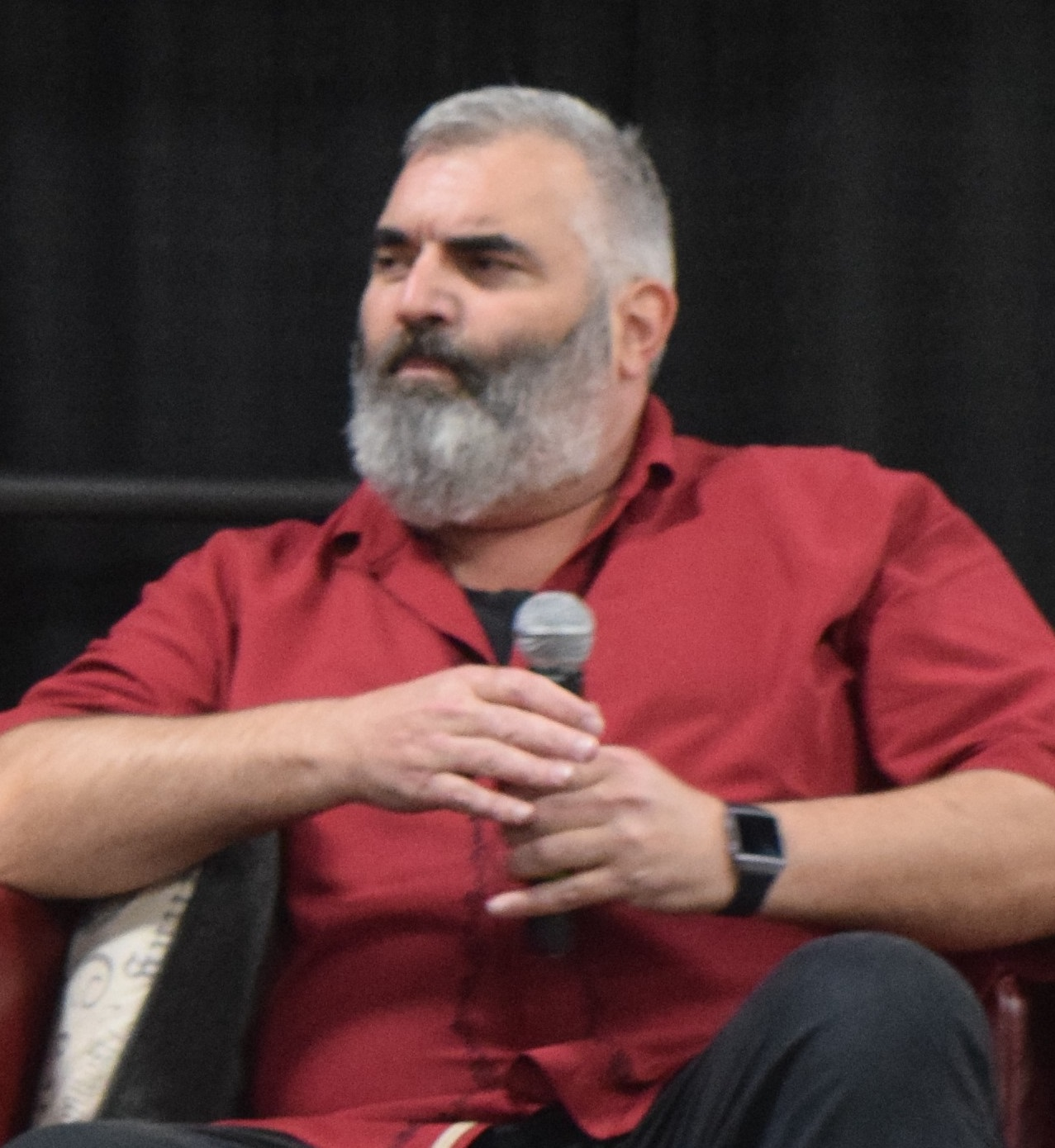
Benjamin Byron Davis reprised his role as Dutch van der Linde in Red Dead Redemption 2.

Dutch van der Linde (Benjamin Byron Davis) is the leader of the Van der Linde gang. He is intently opposed to governmental control, valuing individual liberties and dreaming of an independent life. Dutch's goal is to fight back against a corrupt system of power, and he believes that enough violence will eventually change society's outlook. Early in the gang's history, Dutch took in street kids and orphans, teaching them how to read and establishing the importance of independent thinking and self-worth as they completed tasks for him. Around 1899, Dutch reluctantly begins to realize that his ideals are becoming unrealistic. Shortly before the events of the game, Dutch kills an innocent woman during a botched ferry robbery in Blackwater organized by Micah Bell, forcing the gang into the heart of a blizzard. With the gang, Dutch orchestrates a robbery of a train owned by oil tycoon Leviticus Cornwall. Once the blizzard clears and the gang moves camp to Horseshoe Overlook, Dutch is confronted in the nearby town of Valentine by Cornwall, whose hired guns attack the gang and force them to move to Clemens Point. Dutch befriends Leigh Gray, the sheriff of Rhodes, and is named one of his deputies. Meanwhile, the gang befriends the Braithwaite family, who are rivals to the Gray family. The two families soon discover the betrayal, and the Braithwaites kidnap Jack Marston. Dutch orders an assault on Braithwaite Manor, torching the building and slaughtering the family. The gang moves to Shady Belle and retrieves Jack from businessman and crime boss Angelo Bronte, who gives Dutch a tip that leads to an ambush. Dutch kills Bronte for his betrayal.

After a failed bank heist forces them out of the city of Saint Denis, Dutch and several gang members become shipwrecked on Guarma, an island near Cuba. Dutch murders another woman, prompting Arthur to question his behavior. Dutch befriends revolutionary leader Hercule Fontaine, helping fight with his revolution in exchange for a ship back to the mainland. Reunited with the gang, Dutch begins to grow paranoid, refusing to rescue John Marston from prison; when Arthur Morgan and Sadie Adler rescue him, Dutch becomes furious. He later confronts and kills Cornwall, attends the hanging of his rival Colm O'Driscoll, and helps a group of Native Americans fight against the Army to distract the government from the gang; at one point, he abandons Arthur when he is attacked. After most of the gang leaves, Dutch orchestrates the robbery of a train carrying army payroll but leaves John for dead and Abigail captured at Micah's recommendation. Dutch is later confronted by Arthur, who accuses Micah of betrayal. Dutch turns on Arthur and the newly returned John. Dutch intervenes in a fight between Arthur and Micah, and Arthur convinces him to abandon Micah and leave. In 1907, Dutch meets with Micah before John and Sadie attack Micah's new gang. In a Mexican standoff, Dutch shoots Micah, letting John finish him off, before leaving. During the events of Red Dead Redemption in 1911, John tracks down Dutch, who dies by suicide by backing off a cliff.

When Davis was asked to reprise his role as Dutch, he was unsure of the nature and importance of the role until production began; he first heard about his reprisal in mid-2013, and received about the first 100 pages of the script at the end of the year. As Davis is much taller than Dutch, the animators had to adjust the height from the motion capture performances to fit the character, including eye lines of other characters. Brent Werzner stepped in as a body double for some takes. Davis portrayed Dutch "in his prime"—as a charming, confident man—for about a year before playing the decline of the character. Unsworth felt that Dutch views himself not as a criminal, but somebody fighting against a "corrupt system of power that's been set up to divide and suppress". He noted that Dutch's "anarchic, anti-establishment rhetoric" was compelling for the gang to remain with him.

Davis felt that Dutch was motivated by a "noble drive", believing in the greater good; he described the character as a "principled man", but felt that he began to evolve into a villain particularly when faced against characters who were powerful figures in their areas, such as Catherine Braithwaite and Angelo Bronte. Davis felt that Dutch's downfall takes place when he witnesses the corruption of other people achieving the "utopia" that he wants for his gang and realizes that he does not want the same to happen to him. When Dutch does not have his best friend Hosea Matthews by his side, he is unable to hear criticism, according to Davis; when Arthur tries to help Dutch "see the light", Dutch begins to distrust him, instead turning to the "unwavering [...] support" of Micah". Davis felt that Dutch's dream paradise would be at Horseshoe Overlook, in the game's second chapter, where he was constantly looking to the future. Davis says that Dutch "was a dreamer. The journey was more important than any arrival". Davis felt that, by the end of the game, Dutch was also seeking redemption for his mistakes, which is why he does not harm John or his family.

IGN's Jared Petty compared the strength and downfall of the Van der Linde gang to that of Butch Cassidy's Wild Bunch and the Hole-in-the-Wall Gang. Polygon's Cass Marshall named Dutch one of the greatest characters of the 2010s, citing his complex development.

=== Arthur Morgan ===
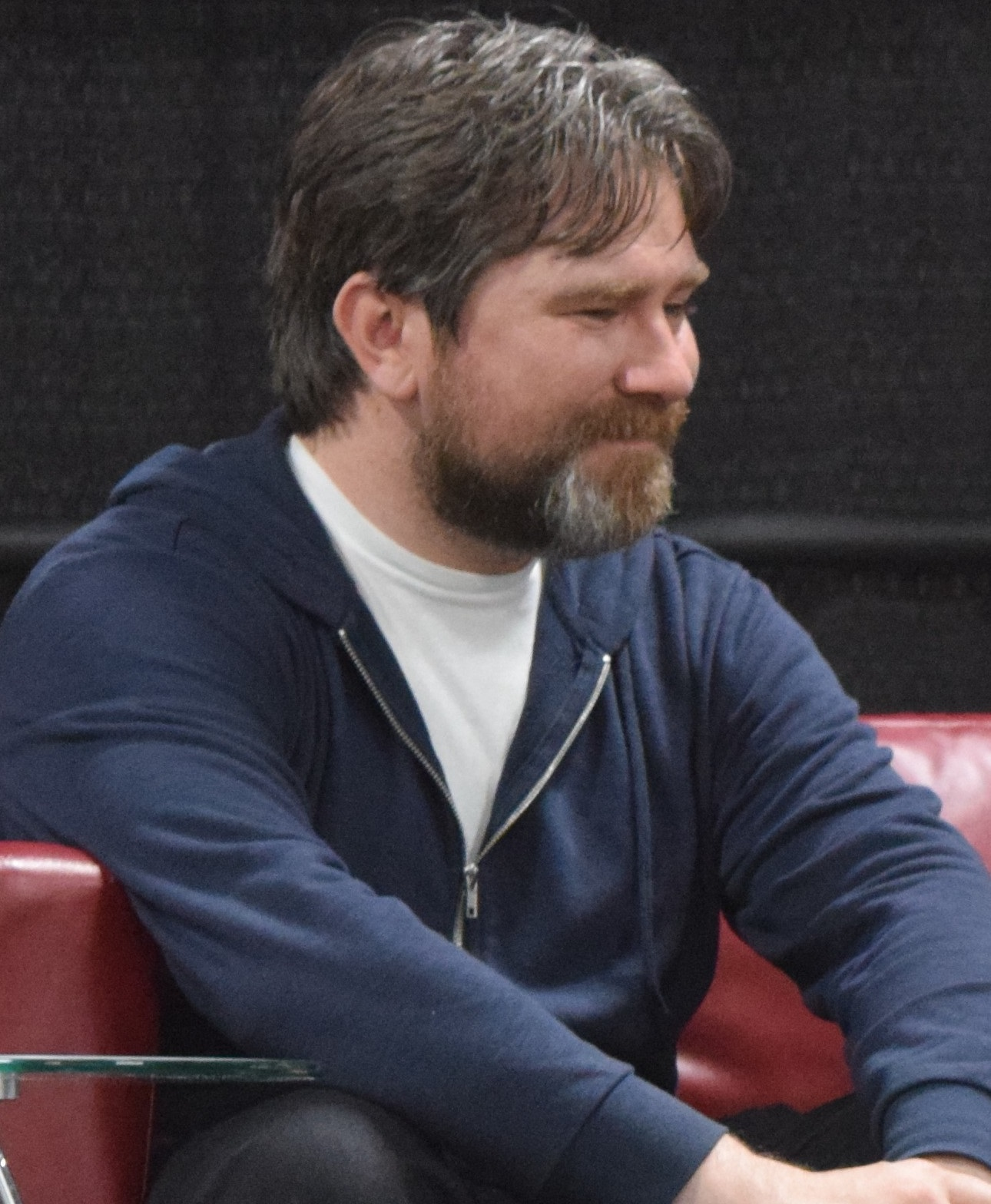
Roger Clark was cast as main playable character Arthur Morgan.

Arthur Morgan (Roger Clark) is the protagonist and main playable character of Red Dead Redemption 2. He joined the Van der Linde gang when he was 14 years old, having lost his parents at a young age, and soon became Dutch's first protégé. Over time, Arthur transformed from a lost cause into Dutch's most dedicated enforcer. He is unwaveringly loyal to the gang, though the failed robbery in Blackwater troubles him. During the events of the game, Arthur helps the gang to survive during a blizzard, moving to Horseshoe Overlook before relocating to Clemens Point. There, Arthur becomes involved in a conflict between the warring Gray and Braithwaite families.

Further exploits lead the gang to Saint Denis where a failed bank heist forces Arthur and some other members of the gang out of town; they soon shipwreck on Guarma, but fight alongside Hercule Fontaine in exchange for a ship back to the mainland. Reuniting with the rest of the gang, Arthur and Sadie save the captured John, much to the disdain of Dutch. Arthur reveals his growing doubts about Dutch. Arthur is soon diagnosed with tuberculosis. Shocked by the grim reality of his imminent death, he contemplates his decisions and reflects on his morals, driving his desire to protect the remnants of the gang. When Dutch ignores Arthur's plea to rescue Abigail, Arthur disavows the gang. Arthur discovers that Micah Bell has been betraying the gang. He informs Dutch, but the latter turns on Arthur and the newly returned John. Arthur and John flee, and Arthur begs John to return to his family. Arthur is soon ambushed by the vengeful Micah, and Dutch intervenes in their fight. Arthur convinces Dutch to abandon Micah and leave. If the player has high honor, Arthur succumbs to his injuries and disease and dies peacefully; if the player has low honor, Micah executes him.

For his portrayal as Arthur, Clark took main inspiration from Toshiro Mifune. He found that Mifune's characters were very stoic while also having a "crazy" sense of humor, a complexity he wanted to portray within Arthur. Clark also took inspiration from The Proposition (2005) as it involved a similar situation to Arthur's, wherein he is forced to betray some of his loyalties. Clark wanted to portray a character that was complex enough for the player to choose his path and still make sense. He aimed to portray vulnerability with Arthur's ego. Clark looked to Rob Wiethoff's portrayal as John in the first game for inspiration with his performance. A second love interest for Arthur was cut from the game during development. Vice President of Creativity Dan Houser was interested in subverting the trope of the protagonist starting as weak and becoming stronger as the story progresses; instead, Arthur is already tough at the beginning of the game, and is "taken on a more intellectual roller coaster when his world view gets taken apart". Houser felt that the decline of the American frontier has a deep impact on Arthur, noting that the character is "caught between the nastiness of nature and the brutality of encroaching industrialization in civilization". Houser avoided meeting Clark on set to avoid hearing his real voice.

=== John Marston ===
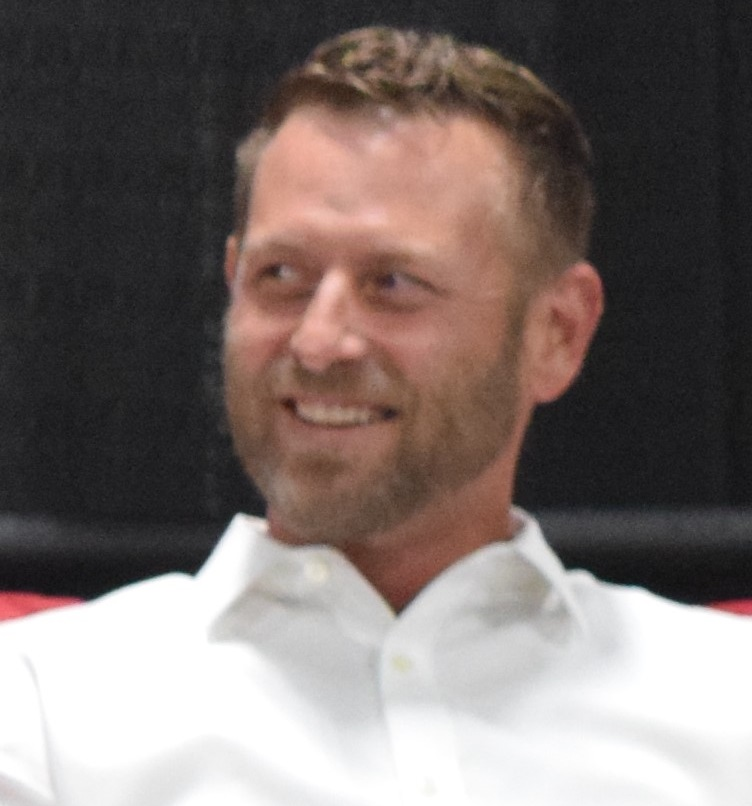
Rob Wiethoff returned for the role of John Marston, the protagonist of the first game.

John Marston (Rob Wiethoff) is the secondary protagonist and playable character of Red Dead Redemption 2. When John was threatened to be lynched after being caught stealing at the age of 12, he was saved by Dutch van der Linde, who took him into his gang and raised him. When Abigail Roberts joined the gang, she and John fell in love and had a son, Jack. During the failed robbery in Blackwater, John is badly wounded. He gets lost after scouting ahead of the gang in the blizzard, and is attacked by wolves, leaving him with facial scars. Arthur Morgan and Javier Escuella save him. Once he has recovered, he joins the gang on some tasks before planning and executing a successful train robbery. During a failed bank robbery, John is captured and incarcerated. Arthur and Sadie rescue him, much to the disdain of Dutch; protective of John's family, Arthur warns John to leave the gang when the time is right. John is later left for dead by Dutch during a train robbery but returns to the camp as Arthur is confronting Dutch and Micah. When Pinkertons invade the camp, Arthur and John flee. John returns to his family at Arthur's wishes.

Eight years later, in 1907, John finds honest work with Abigail, but when John fights back against outlaws threatening his employer, Abigail leaves with Jack. John works to get her back by earning enough money to buy a property at Beecher's Hope. He builds a ranch with the help of Uncle and Charles Smith, while Sadie provides him with bounty hunting jobs to pay off his loans. After Abigail returns, John proposes. With Sadie and Charles, John attacks Micah's new gang, where they find Dutch. In a Mexican standoff, Dutch shoots Micah, letting John finish him off, before leaving. John takes the money from the Blackwater robbery and later marries Abigail at their ranch. During the events of Red Dead Redemption in 1911, John tracks down Bill, Javier, and Dutch, before being killed by the government.

When developing John, who is also the protagonist of the original game, the writers felt that his previous appearance could be limiting to them, since players have already resonated with the character. Wiethoff, who reprises his role as John, looked to his own life when returning to the character; he always looked up to his older sister's male friends for approval in the same way that John looks up to the rest of the gang for validation. He also took inspiration from the "pretty tough dudes" in his home town for John's personality. Game Informer staff felt that, by the end of the game, John had developed into "the man we knew him to be in the original game: loving, faithful, honorable, and tragically doomed".

=== Abigail Roberts ===
Abigail Roberts (Cali Elizabeth Moore) is the wife of John Marston and the mother of Jack. Abigail was an orphan as a child and later earned her money as a prostitute. She was introduced to the gang around 1894 by Uncle and fell pregnant with John's son, Jack, soon afterward. Abigail cares deeply for John and Jack: when John is missing early in the game, she asks Arthur to search for him; and when Jack is abducted by the Braithwaites, she is visibly distraught until his return. She often commits crimes alongside the gang, including distracting the guards during the gang's robbery of the bank in Lemoyne and stealing Hosea's body from police after his death. She also attempts to join Arthur and Sadie as they rescue John from prison, but they refuse. Abigail is later kidnapped from the camp by Agent Milton. Arthur and Sadie attempt to rescue her, but the latter is captured and the former is held at gunpoint by Milton; Abigail breaks free and kills Milton. After they escape, Abigail gives Arthur the key to the gang's money, which she had found at camp, before departing to meet up with Jack.

Eight years later, in 1907, Abigail finds honest work with John, but when John fights back against outlaws threatening his employer, Abigail believes he is unwilling to give up his old ways and leaves with Jack. She returns after John takes out a bank loan and purchases a ranch, but berates him for continuing to work as a bounty hunter with Sadie. John proposes to Abigail and, after John kills Micah and finds the gang's money, the two marry and start their new life on the ranch with Jack and Uncle. Four years later, during the events of Red Dead Redemption in 1911, Abigail and Jack are abducted so John will search for his former comrades; they are returned when he completes his task, and Abigail dies in 1914.

Moore found ease in recording the couple's proposal scene, as both she and Wiethoff remembered their own proposals; she recalled only recording the scene twice, due to the emotion. She noted that both she and Wiethoff started crying during rehearsals for the scene. Moore also became emotional during the scenes in which Jack is returned to the camp, considering if the scenario was applied to her own children.

=== Bill Williamson ===
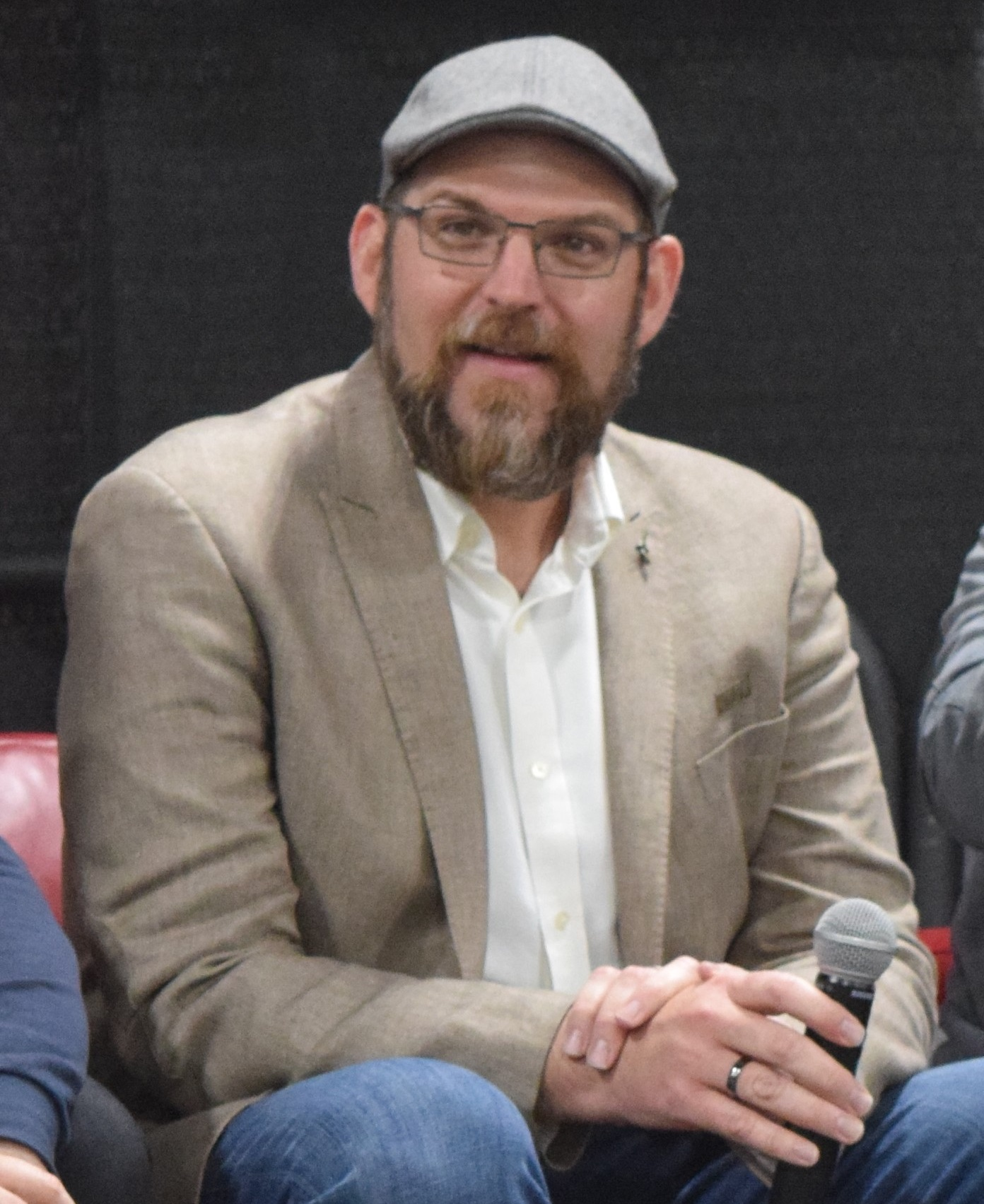
Steve J. Palmer reprised his role as Bill Williamson.

Bill Williamson (Steve J. Palmer) is an enforcer of the Van der Linde gang. Born as Marion Williamson, Bill changed his name due to embarrassment. Bill served in the Army during the later years of the Indian wars. He was dishonorably discharged from military service in 1892 for attempted murder and deviancy, leading to a life of violence and alcoholism. He joined the gang about six years before the events of the game, having been saved by Dutch after trying to rob him and at a low point in his life. Bill is frequently mocked by the rest of the gang due to his short temper, small mindedness, and alcoholism, but remains loyal to the group. He assists the gang on several outings, later coordinating a successful bank heist with Karen Jones in Valentine. Bill accompanies high-ranking members of the gang on several occasions, including the shootout with the Grays, the party at the mayor's mansion, the attack on Angelo Bronte's mansion, and the failed Saint Denis bank robbery, after which he becomes shipwrecked on Guarma with some other members of the gang. Upon their return, Bill continues to assist with robberies. When Arthur confronts Dutch, Bill sides with the latter, eventually escaping. Twelve years later, during the events of Red Dead Redemption in 1911, Bill is hunted down by John and later killed.

Palmer was inspired by a comment made by Abigail in the original game, where she claims that Bill was harmless when she knew him; he found her viewpoint to be interesting and decided to approach his performance in the second game with this in mind. Palmer often referenced his portrayal of Bill in the original game during the production of Red Dead Redemption 2. He considered Bill to be internally insecure, having a lot to say but unable to express himself properly; he found that the most emotionally draining moment of his portrayal was during a campfire scene where Bill manages to express his emotion when explaining how Dutch saved him. Palmer also expanded on a line of John's from the original game stating that Bill knows how to survive at all costs. He felt that Bill was always seeking approval from his fellow gang members and thought that Bill may have chosen a different side in the story if he was told that he was accepted and appreciated within the gang.

=== Charles Smith ===
Charles Smith (Noshir Dalal) is a recent addition to the Van der Linde gang. Born to an African-American father and Native American mother, Charles often struggled to find a place to belong. A quiet and reserved man, Charles is honest, principled, and highly skilled at hunting and tracking, as well as a deadly fighter. He joined the gang about six months before the events of the game as he agreed with their overall ideologies. Charles accompanies the gang on several outings, including the robbery of Cornwall's train, the rescue of Sean MacGuire, and the train robbery orchestrated by John. Charles partakes in the failed bank robbery in Saint Denis, later distracting Pinkerton guards to allow some of the gang members to escape the country. During their absence, Charles and Sadie unite and relocate the gang. Upon their return, Charles and Arthur help the Native Americans in their fight against the army; Charles eventually chooses to stay at the reservation to help protect the Native Americans. Eight years later, in 1907, Charles is participating in fighting tournaments to earn money in Saint Denis. He leaves the city to help John build his house at his new ranch and later accompanies him and Sadie as they track down and kill Micah. Charles attends John and Abigail's wedding before departing the ranch.

Dalal resonated with Charles as he is half-Japanese and half-Parsi. He drew experiences from his personal life when portraying the character. The original actor for Charles was recast as the team felt he did not fit.

=== Hosea Matthews ===
Hosea Matthews (Curzon Dobell) is the co-founder and second-in-command of the Van der Linde gang. Hosea first met Dutch about 20 years before the events of the game when they tried to rob each other on the road to Chicago. They quickly became friends, committing crimes and building a gang together. Valued for his wisdom, along with his skill as a con artist, Hosea regularly advises Dutch as the two share similar ideals. Hosea married a woman named Bessie and attempted to leave the life of crime with her, but drifted back into it. When she died, he was devastated and drank heavily for a year. When the gang's focus changed from helping others to being focused on its survival in violent ways, Hosea began to feel disillusioned with the group but remained a loyal member. By the events of the game in 1899, Hosea is Dutch's most senior lieutenant, often voicing his disapproval of Dutch's methods and preferring to rob peacefully. Hosea barters with Catherine Braithwaite in an attempt to double-cross her and is later present when the gang attacks her manor to save Jack. At a party at the mayor's residence, Hosea discovers two lucrative leads; one is a bank robbery in Saint Denis, which he convinces Dutch to do. Hosea successfully distracts law enforcement but is captured and fatally shot in the chest by Agent Milton in front of the bank.

Dobell worked on the game generally around twice a month for four years. He familiarized himself with the original game about six months into production. Dobell did not take specific information from other media or characters for Hosea, though he used his own acting experience as basis for portraying Hosea's conman theatrics. He found that Hosea was more "reflective" than characters such as Arthur. Dobell felt that Hosea's death left Dutch "exposed", and ultimately led to the gang's demise.

Game Informer staff considered Hosea "most interesting when the cracks in his sweet facade show", such as when he mocks Catherine Braithwaite or pulls a pistol on Bill. They felt that Hosea's death signaled the gang's demise.

=== Jack Marston ===
Jack Marston (Note: In the credits of Red Dead Redemption, Jack's name is listed as John "Jack" Marston Jr.) (Marissa Buccianti and Ted Sutherland) is the son of John Marston and Abigail Roberts. Buccianti portrayed the character as a young child, while Sutherland portrayed Jack as a pre-teen. Jack was born into the gang, who go to great lengths to protect him. He wishes to spend more time with his father, and wants more children to spend time with at camp. During the events of the game, Jack is kidnapped by the Braithwaite family and given to Angelo Bronte, who treats him well and returns him to the gang when confronted. John begins to show more affection towards Jack after he is returned. In the years that follow after the gang's dissolution, Jack and his family regularly move around the country. In 1907, they return to West Elizabeth, being briefly based at Pronghorn Ranch before Jack and his mother leave John. They return to John after he has bought a ranch at Beecher's Hope, bringing a dog named Rufus with them. Four years later, during the events of Red Dead Redemption in 1911, Abigail and Jack are abducted so John will search for his former comrades; they are returned when he completes his task. After John is killed by the Bureau of Investigation in 1911 and Abigail dies in 1914, Jack tracks down and kills the now-retired bureau director Edgar Ross.

Mashable's Jess Joho described Jack as "a representation of innocence contrasting the cruelty of his surroundings", noting that he becomes more fleshed-out in the game's epilogue.

=== Javier Escuella ===
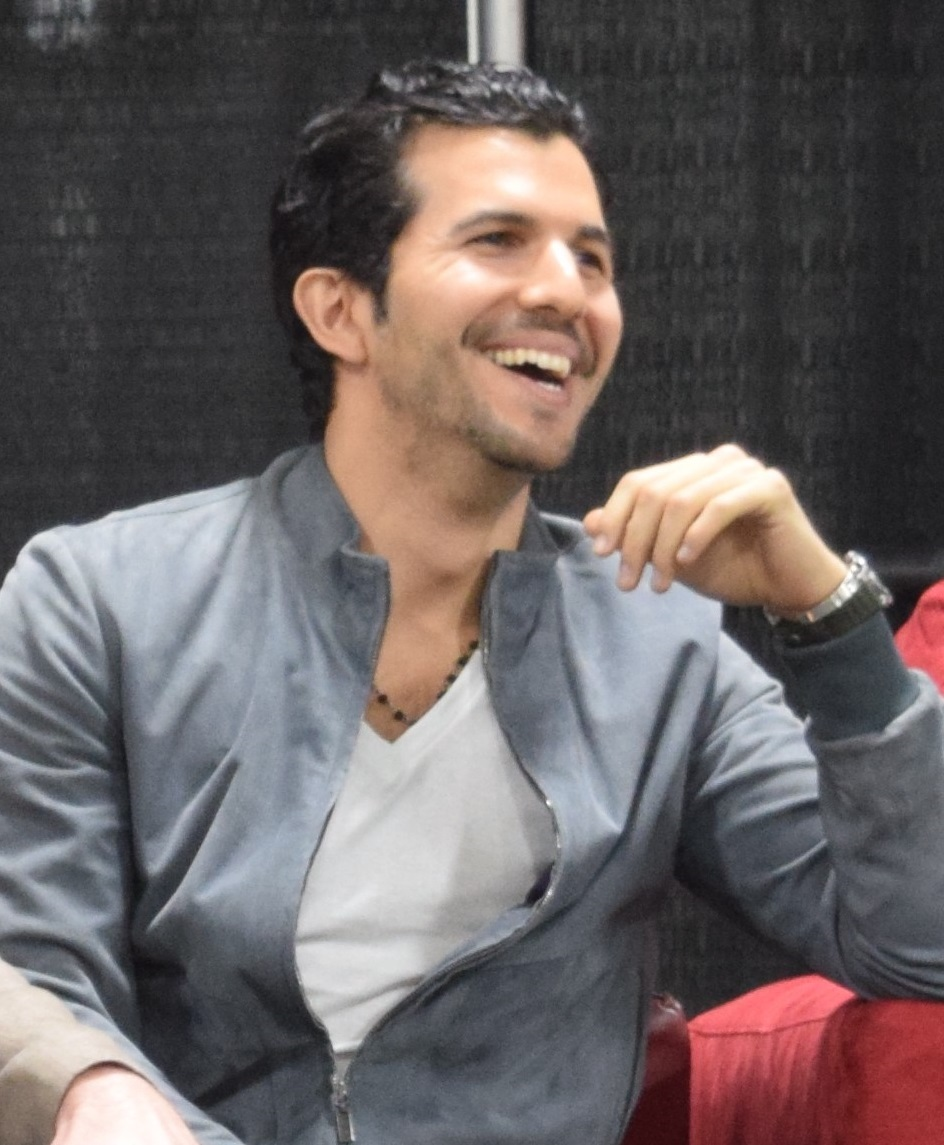
Gabriel Sloyer took over the role of Javier Escuella, who was played by Antonio Jaramillo in the first game.

Javier Escuella (Gabriel Sloyer) is a gunman in the Van der Linde gang. Born in Nuevo Paraíso, Mexico, Javier was forced to flee after killing a high-ranking army official over a woman. He joined Dutch's gang about four years before the events of the game, discovering a strong connection to Dutch's ideologies; as a result, he is incredibly loyal to Dutch. During the events of the game in 1899, Javier joins Arthur on several occasions, including searching for John, robbing Leviticus Cornwall's train, and rescuing Sean. Javier partakes in the Saint Denis bank robbery, after which he becomes shipwrecked on Guarma with some other members of the gang. There, he is shot in the leg and captured by soldiers, but later rescued by Dutch and Arthur. Upon the group's return to America, Javier continues to assist with robberies. When Arthur confronts Dutch, Javier sides with the latter, eventually escaping. Twelve years later, during the events of Red Dead Redemption in 1911, Javier is hunted down by John and captured or killed.

Sloyer wanted players to fight against any preconceived notions about Javier from the first game, so his eventual fight against John was "even more painful". Sloyer felt that Javier is "looking for home, somewhere to belong", feeling torn between grasping at the American Dream and longing for his home in Mexico. Sloyer considered Javier to be a romantic, calling him the "Brad Pitt of the gang". When portraying the character, Sloyer considered the life of his own father, also named Javier, and his experience with immigrating to the United States. Sloyer attempted to emulate real-life Mexican bandit Joaquin Murrieta through the character of Javier, particularly in his quiet, brooding moments wherein he attempts to escape his dark past.

=== Josiah Trelawny ===
Josiah Trelawny (Stephen Gevedon) is a conman and an associate of the Van der Linde gang. A flamboyant conman, Trelawny is allowed to move in and out of Dutch's gang as he likes. He helps Arthur, Javier, and Charles track down Sean, acting as a distraction to some of the guards. Sometime later, he is arrested for involvement in an illegal operation; while being transported to jail, he is freed when Arthur assists lawmen in capturing runaway fugitives. Trelawny orchestrates and participates in several heists with the gang, including a stagecoach robbery with Arthur and a heist on a lavish riverboat with Javier, Arthur, and Strauss. As the gang begins to fall apart, Trelawny quietly leaves the gang permanently with Arthur's blessing.

When Gevedon was cast in the role, he initially did not know that the project was a game, and suspected that recording would take around a week. He was told that Trelawny was much different to the other gang members, wearing better clothes and acting more professionally, but was still "rough around the edges". Gevedon described Trelawny's accent as a "bad Katharine Hepburn, partly because he was too uncomfortable to perform a true English accent around the British crew, as well as to keep the character mysterious. Rockstar told Gevedon that they enjoyed his performance enough to expand Trelawny's role within the game. The secret revelation of the character's wife and children was added in the final years of development.

=== Karen Jones ===
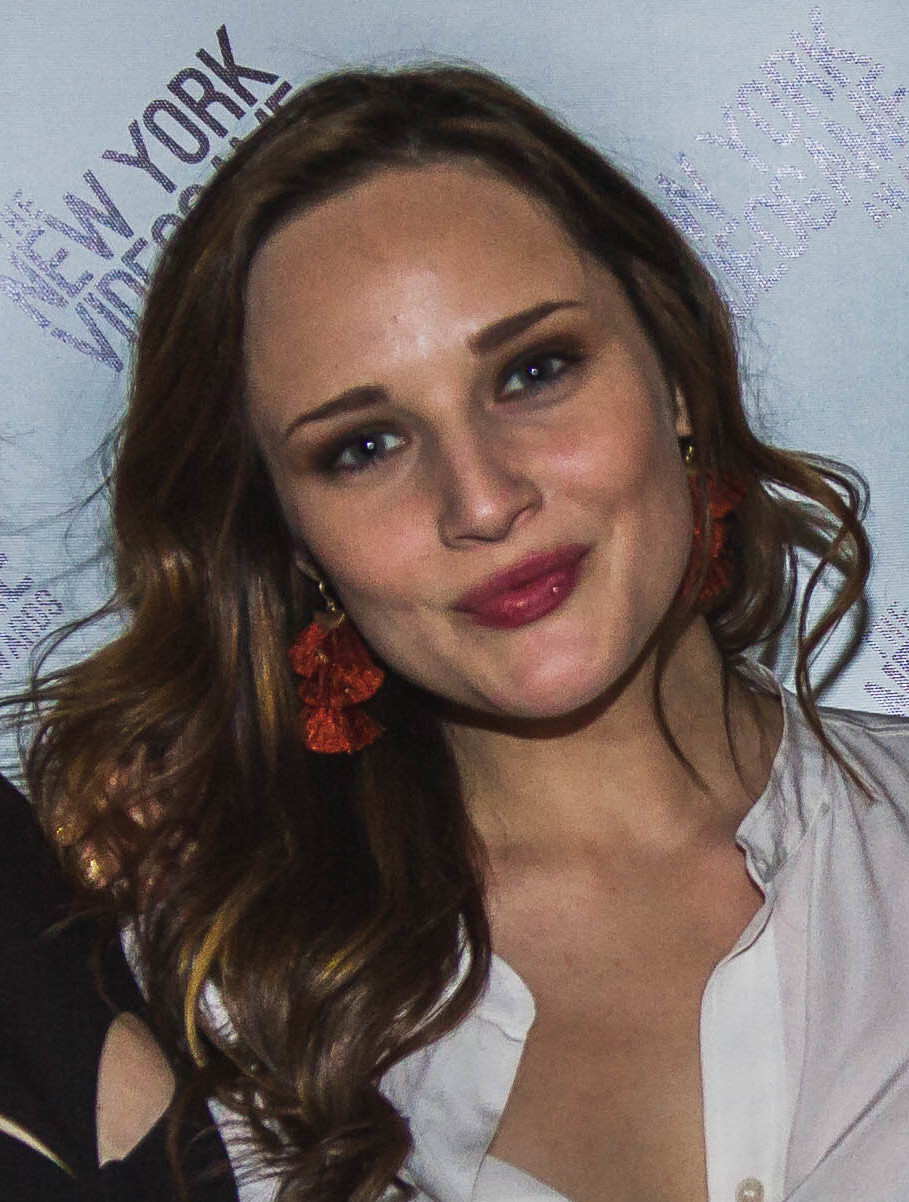
Jo Armeniox portrayed Karen Jones in Red Dead Redemption 2.

Karen Jones (Jo Armeniox) is a thief and gunwoman in the Van der Linde gang. She is big-hearted and looks out for the gang, especially the women, and is not afraid to speak her mind. A keen scam artist, Karen enjoys the outlaw lifestyle. Karen orchestrates and participates in the robbery of the Valentine bank with Arthur, Bill, and Lenny, either pretending to be a drunk harlot or a lost girl. She has a brief love affair with Sean; after his death, Karen's alcoholism worsens and she is usually found intoxicated at camp. Karen eventually leaves the gang during its downfall, and her fate is unknown; Tilly surmises that she drank herself to death.

Armeniox stated that she drew from an "angry, rebellious" side of herself and enjoyed expressing strong emotions through the character that she normally would not show in real life. She particularly appreciated scenes where Karen and Arthur drink and share stories.

=== Kieran Duffy ===
Kieran Duffy (Pico Alexander) is a stable boy. Originally a lowly member of the O'Driscoll gang, Kieran is captured by Arthur and later coerced by Dutch and Bill to turn on his former gang and give up the location of one of their safehouses. During the raid on the safehouse, Kieran shoots an O'Driscoll, saving Arthur's life. He soon becomes a full member of Dutch's gang, but several of its members never truly support him. After some time with the Van der Linde gang, Kieran is captured by the O'Driscolls and tortured until they discover the gang's location at Shady Belle. Kieran is decapitated and has his eyes gouged out, and his corpse is sent back to Dutch's gang on horseback.

=== Lenny Summers ===
Lenny Summers (Harron Atkins) is a young gunman in the Van der Linde gang. He is well educated, having received good schooling as a child from his father and uncle. When Lenny was 15, his father was killed by drunk people while walking home at night; in retaliation, Lenny stole a gun and shot his father's killers. After spending three years on the run, Lenny joined the Van der Linde gang. He is dedicated to working hard and doing his part for the gang, as proven early during the events of the game when he participates in the robbery of Leviticus Cornwall's train. He forms a strong bond with Arthur, particularly when the two get drunk together in Valentine. In Rhodes, Lenny tracks down a group of ex-confederates known as the Lemoyne Raiders; he and Arthur ambush their camp and kill them. Lenny later participates in the robberies of the Valentine bank and the Saint Denis trolley station, and the ambush on Angelo Bronte's mansion. During the Saint Denis bank robbery, Lenny is gunned down and killed by Pinkertons while leading the gang's escape.

Game Informer's Jason Guisao praised Lenny's role in Red Dead Redemption 2, describing him as "a vocal reminder of the heightened racial tensions that plagued the wild frontier". Slate's Jonathan S. Jones appreciated Lenny's "overt commentary about the brutality of life under slavery and Jim Crow".

=== Leopold Strauss ===
Leopold Strauss (Howard Pinhasik) is the bookkeeper and accountant of the Van der Linde gang. He grew up poor in Vienna in the Austro-Hungarian Empire, suffering from health problems during childhood. At the age of 17, Strauss was sent on a boat to America, where he spent several years as a scam artist. He soon joined the Van der Linde gang for protection and is responsible for the gang's money-lending operation. He is typically emotionless and known for being shifty. As the gang moves locations, Strauss continues to operate his loansharking business, tasking Arthur with collecting the money from several debtors each time. He partakes in the robbery of a lavish riverboat in Saint Denis. After being tasked with more loansharking tasks, Arthur decides to banish Strauss from camp for ruining lives with his business. Strauss is later captured by the Pinkertons and interrogated, but is said to have died in custody without revealing any information about the gang.

=== Mary-Beth Gaskill ===
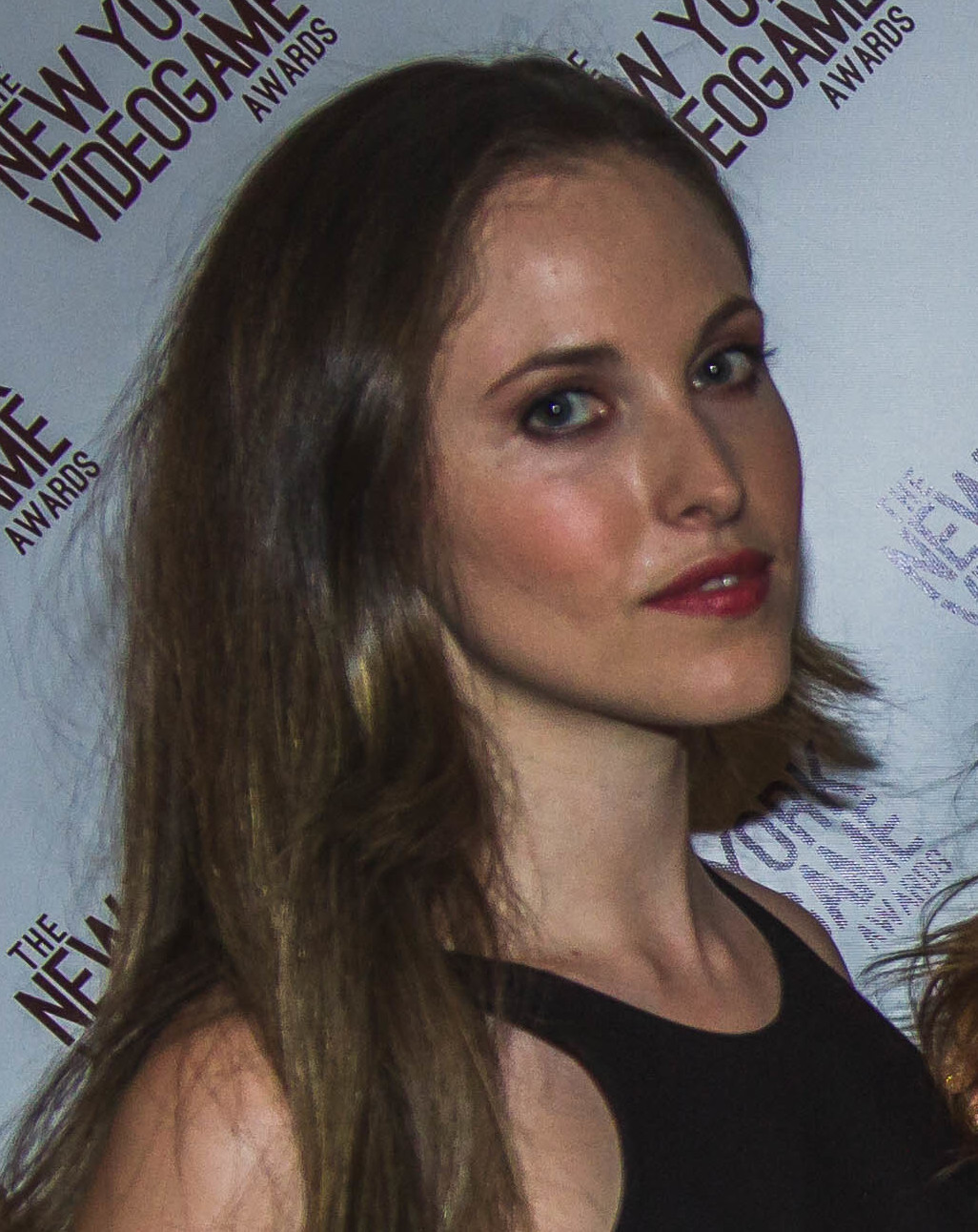
Samantha Strelitz portrayed Mary-Beth Gaskill.

Mary-Beth Gaskill (Samantha Strelitz) is a young pickpocketing thief in the Van der Linde gang. After her mother died of typhoid, Mary-Beth lived in an orphanage at a young age but ran away to take care of herself. She soon became known as a highly skilled pickpocket despite her kind heart and good nature, and encountered the Van der Linde gang while being chased by several men she had pickpocketed. She enjoys reading and writing, and had dreams of becoming a novelist when she was young. During the events of the game, she assists Arthur on some occasions, including finding a lead on a train robbery and distracting a driver during a stagecoach heist. She often talks with Arthur about his life and gives him encouraging words when he tells her about his tuberculosis. As the gang begins to fall apart, Mary-Beth eventually leaves. Eight years later, in 1907, she encounters John in Valentine, revealing she has become a novelist under the pen name "Leslie Dupont". She keeps in close contact with Tilly.

Strelitz worked on the game for around 3–4 years. Strelitz felt that Mary-Beth is a sweet girl who "gets lost in the world of her books". She referred to the character as "the Danielle Steel of 1899" because of her obsession with romance novels, which she noted reflects her personality. Strelitz felt the scene in which Arthur discusses his sickness with Mary-Beth has a "gravitas" for those who play the game, but also "such an innocence ... because if someone tells you that how do you even take that all in?".

=== Micah Bell ===
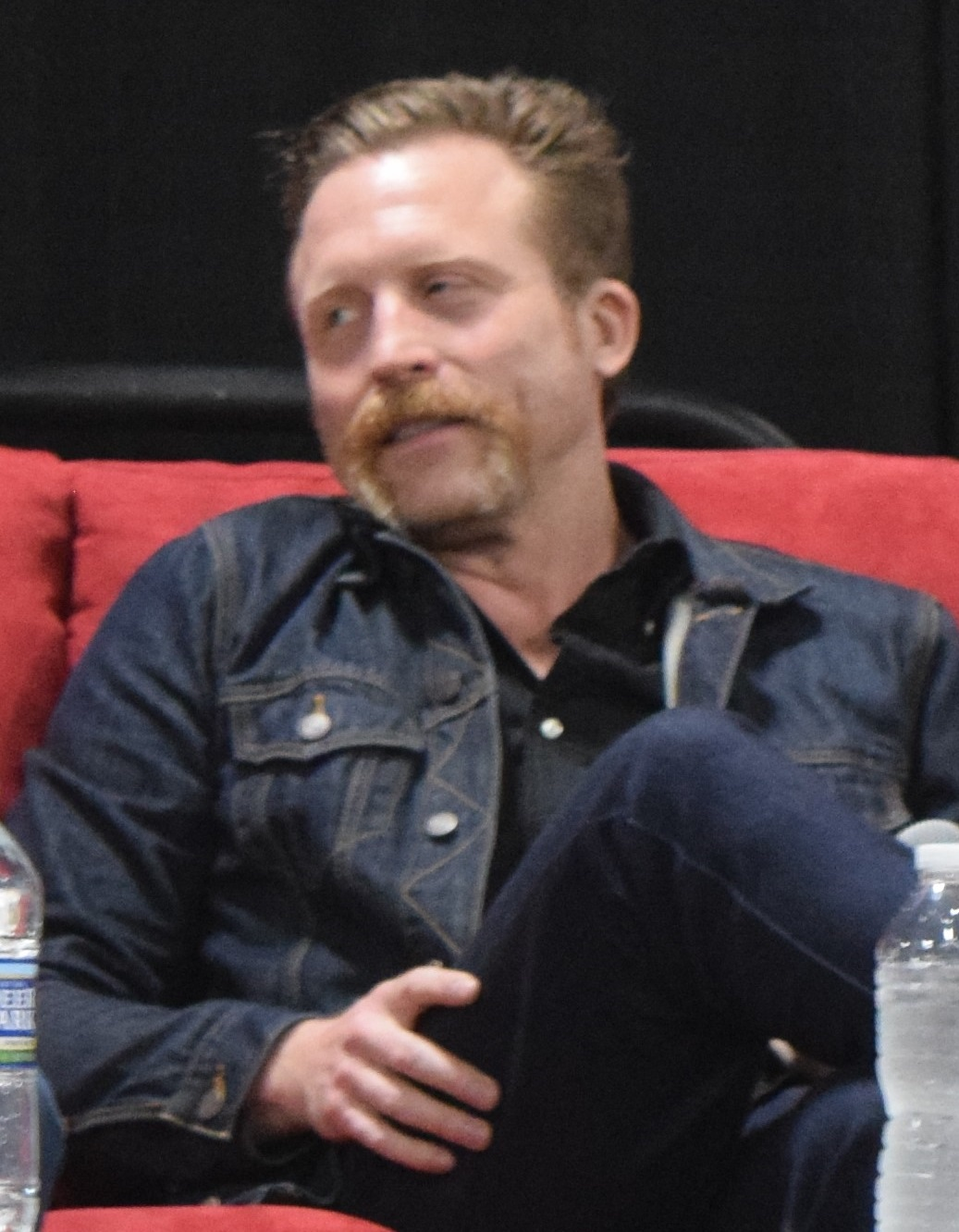
Peter Blomquist, who previously worked with Rockstar on L.A. Noire, was cast as Micah Bell in Red Dead Redemption 2.

Micah Bell (Peter Blomquist) is a gunman and hitman in the Van der Linde gang. Both Micah's father and grandfather, also named Micah Bell, were criminals—his father was once wanted for murder in five counties—while his brother, whom he abhors, lives in California. Micah joined the Van der Linde gang about five months before the game's events after he saved Dutch's life during a botched deal. He consistently approves of Dutch's decisions, and has a vindictive and nihilistic attitude. Micah convinced Dutch to rob a ferry in Blackwater, which ultimately failed and forced the gang to flee to a mining town in the mountains. Micah partakes in the Saint Denis bank robbery, after which he becomes shipwrecked on Guarma with some other members of the gang. Upon their return, Micah begins to have a stronger influence on Dutch, convincing him to confront Cornwall and later to blow up Bacchus Bridge to distract the government. Micah convinces Dutch to ignore Arthur's plea to rescue Abigail after she is kidnapped. Arthur rescues her and returns to the camp to inform Dutch that Micah has been betraying the gang to the Pinkertons; Dutch joins Micah and turns on Arthur. When Pinkertons invade the camp, the group disbands. Micah ambushes Arthur, and Dutch intervenes in their fight. Arthur convinces Dutch to abandon Micah and leave. If the player has low honor, Micah executes Arthur. Eight years later, in 1907, Micah has formed a gang of his own. John, Sadie, and Charles later track him down at his camp. In a Mexican standoff, Dutch shoots Micah, letting John finish him off.

For his audition, Blomquist was required to perform a monologue, which was not related to the game's era but reflected Micah's violent tendencies. About four or five months passed until Blomquist was accepted for the role. He was not aware that Micah was one of the game's main antagonists until late in production. He opted to develop the character from scratch, instead of taking specific inspiration from others. Blomquist felt that his chemistry with other actors, particularly Davis as Dutch and Clark as Arthur, was crucial to the development of the characters' relationships. Blomquist described the character of Micah Bell as a "slimy opportunist", and found the character's villainous nature to be "liberating". He did not anticipate the hatred that the character would receive from players on social media. The recording of the final encounter between Micah and Arthur took place late in production, which Blomquist felt added to the emotions of the actors.

=== Molly O'Shea ===
Molly O'Shea (Penny O'Brien) is Dutch's lover and a member of the gang. Born in Dublin, Ireland to a wealthy family, Molly moved to America in search of excitement. She eventually joined the Van der Linde gang and fell in love with Dutch, but wants more in their relationship than he is prepared to give. She considers herself to be better than other members of the gang, which often leads to her exclusion. She eventually becomes fed up with Dutch ignoring her, and, while drunk, returns to camp and tells the gang that she informed the Pinkertons about their botched bank heist. She is killed by Susan Grimshaw with a gunshot to the chest for disobeying the gang's rules. Arthur later discovers that Molly did not reveal any information to the Pinkertons while interrogated.

O'Brien's audition took place on Saint Patrick's Day in 2015. She was told to audition with a "really Irish" accent and personality. She had not played the original game, but watched videos after receiving the part. O'Brien began to understand the character of Molly around a year into production; she worked on the game for about three years. She described Molly as "a very desperate character set in very extreme circumstances". She found that Molly's relationship with Dutch is echoed in her relationship with the latter's actor, Benjamin Byron Davis. "Some jokes that were made while we were in our tent ... we'll still make together when we're sitting at dinner", she said. When recording one of the arguments between Molly and Dutch, the director spoke with the actors separately about their motivations but did not reveal them to the other; O'Brien found that Davis' in-character ignorance to Molly frustrated her more, adding to the scene. O'Brien felt that Molly did not achieve redemption by the game's end; she stated that Molly left Ireland to move away from its working conditions and barren nature, but by affiliating herself with Dutch, denied herself the opportunity to reach redemption. O'Brien's inspiration for Molly's final moments was a cry for help and a need for Dutch's attention.

=== Mr. Pearson ===
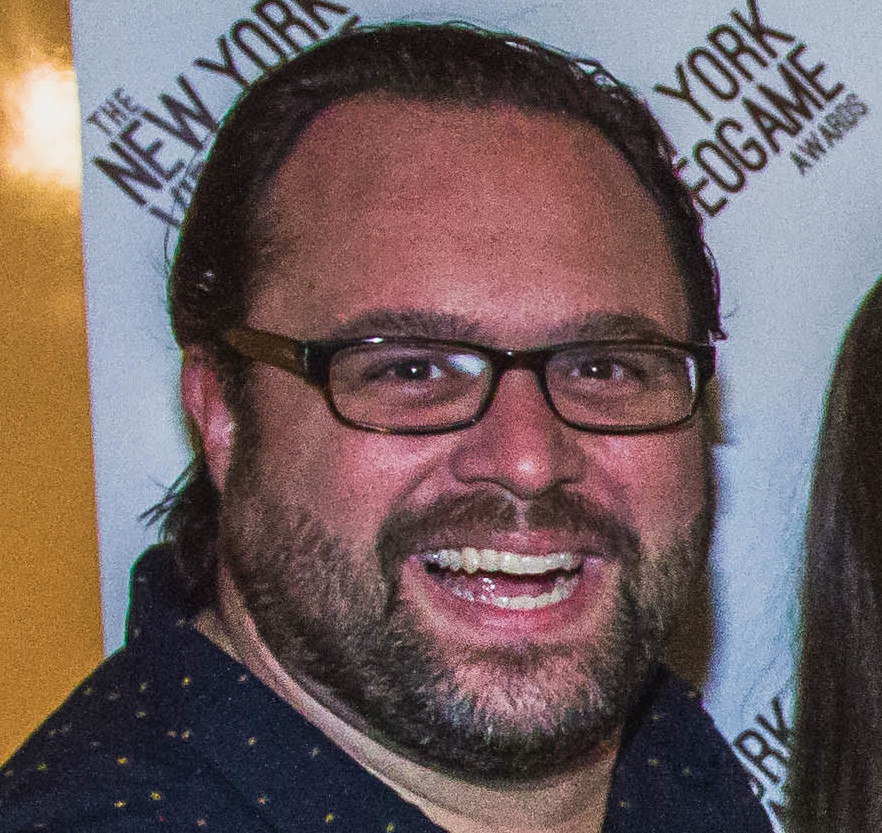
Jim Santangeli played Mr. Pearson in the game.

Simon Pearson (Jim Santangeli) is the cook and butcher of the Van der Linde gang. His father and grandfather were both sperm whale hunters; Pearson wished to follow in their footsteps, but the occupation was obsolete by the time he finished school. For a brief period, he was part of the United States Navy. When he moved out west, he encountered financial trouble; Dutch discovered him and invited him into the gang. Pearson is shocked by his life's circumstances but displays a loud and jolly exterior. He sends Arthur to retrieve food and supplies several times and is responsible for setting up the camp with Susan Grimshaw upon each relocation. When the gang begins to collapse, Pearson becomes unhappy and decides to leave. Eight years later, in 1907, he owns and runs the general store in Rhodes, and is married.

=== Reverend Swanson ===
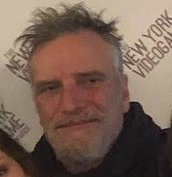
Sean Haberle portrayed Reverend Swanson.

Reverend Orville Swanson (Sean Haberle) is a minister and member of the Van der Linde gang. Once a clergyman, Swanson began to use morphine to ease his pain a few years before the events of the game, eventually leading to his addiction to alcohol. Over time, he has lost his sense of direction, religion, and self-esteem. He once saved Dutch's life, and thus is allowed to remain in the gang. Early during the events of the game, Arthur finds the drunk Swanson and saves him from a fight and an oncoming train. By the time some of the gang return from Guarma, Swanson has become sober and is functioning better. As the gang begins to fall apart, Swanson decides to leave; depending on the player's honor, Swanson may encounter Arthur a final time, bestowing wise words about the latter's path to redemption. Sometime over the next eight years, by 1907, Swanson has moved to New York and become a preacher.

GamesRadar's Paul Walker-Emig noted the egalitarianism of the gang to offer Swanson a home and supplies while recovering from his addiction. Polygon's Campbell criticized the trope of Swanson as the gang's "drunken, self-loathing padre".

=== Sadie Adler ===
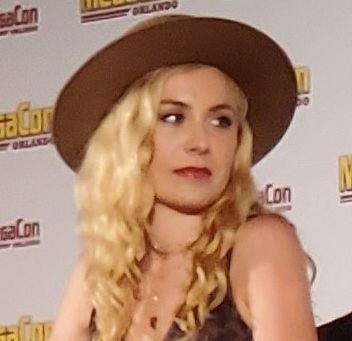
Alex McKenna was cast as Sadie Adler.

Sadie Adler (Alex McKenna) is a gunwoman and bounty hunter. She grew up in the mountains, where she learned to ride, shoot, and hunt. On their farm, she and her husband Jake shared the workload until he was killed by O'Driscolls in their home, where Sadie hid. During the events of the game, Arthur, Dutch, and Micah kill the O'Driscolls, rescuing Sadie and inadvertently setting her house ablaze. She decides to stay with the gang, vowing revenge on the O'Driscolls. Sometime later, when the gang is based at Clemens Point, Sadie becomes dissatisfied with her job of preparing food; Arthur takes her to town to run some errands, but they are attacked by Lemoyne Raiders on their return, prompting the two to fight them off. Afterward, she seeks to be involved in the gang's heists. When the O'Driscolls assault the camp, Sadie refuses Arthur's orders to get to safety and helps the gang kill and drive away from the O'Driscolls.

When the senior members of the gang are in Guarma, Sadie and Charles unite and relocate the remainder of the group, protecting them in the meantime. After their return, Sadie and Arthur resolve to save the captured John, much to the disdain of Dutch. Sadie is present at Colm O'Driscoll's hanging, eventually leading to a firefight with the O'Driscolls. Sometime later, she and Arthur may end the O'Driscoll gang by attacking their ranch, where Sadie finally exacts revenge on the man who killed her husband. She is present during the battle against the Army at Cornwall's refinery and participates in the gang's final robbery of a train. When Abigail is captured by the Pinkertons, Sadie joins Arthur in rescuing her. As Arthur leaves to confront Dutch and Micah, Sadie takes Abigail to meet with Jack and Tilly. Eight years later, in 1907, Sadie has become a successful bounty hunter, employing John for some tasks. She tracks down Micah's new gang and attacks them with Charles and John, but gets stabbed in the stomach. She helps John by distracting Micah, but the latter holds her at gunpoint. After Dutch reveals himself and shoots Micah, John finishes off the latter. Sadie attends John and Abigail's wedding before departing.

McKenna knew very little about the character and project early in development. McKenna felt that she began to truly understand the character of Sadie about three years into the five-year process, only receiving small portions of the script at a time. McKenna said that the scene in which Sadie gets her revenge "haunted [her] a little", as she experienced a lot of Sadie's backstory up to that point. Motion capture director Rod Edge described Sadie as "so feminine but so tough". McKenna appreciated the lack of stereotyping with her character and enjoyed her equality to Arthur instead of a love story. The actors formed a close bond during production, which helped with individual performances. McKenna felt that Sadie continued to travel without settling after the events of the game.

=== Sean MacGuire ===
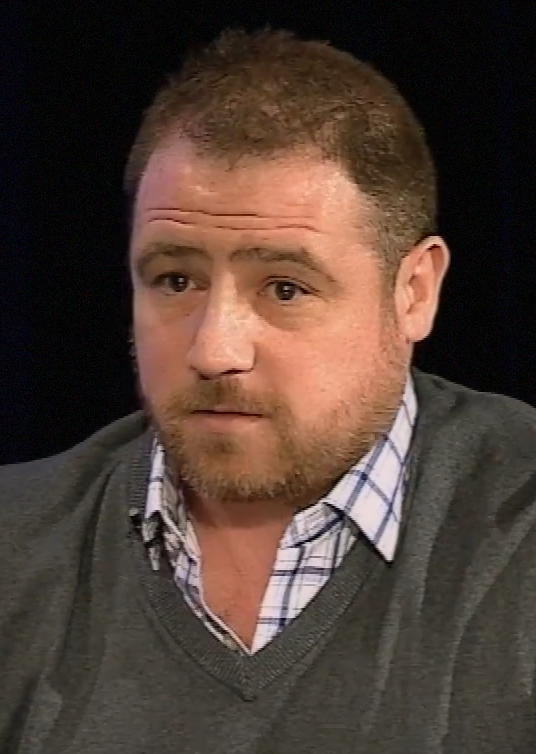
Michael Mellamphy plays Sean MacGuire.

Sean MacGuire (Michael Mellamphy) is a gunman of the Van der Linde gang. A cocky young Irish thief, he is a descendant of several criminals; his father, who was wanted by the government, fled to America with Sean but was caught and killed. After unsuccessfully attempting to steal Dutch's pocket watch in an alleyway, Sean joined the Van der Linde gang. After the gang's botched ferry robbery in Blackwater, Sean is separated and captured by bounty hunters. He is rescued by Arthur, Charles, and Javier, and the gang throws a party to celebrate his return; during the party, he and Karen have sex. Sean later joins the gang on some outings, including a train robbery and burning the Grays' tobacco fields along with Arthur. He joins Arthur, Bill, and Micah on a potential job in Rhodes, but is shot in the head by a sniper while walking the street.

Mellamphy was the second actor to be cast as Sean, replacing the previous actor later in the production. Mellamphy worked on the game for three years, over which the character of Sean developed significantly. He eventually discovered more about the character over time; he initially did not know that Sean was a member of the Van der Linde gang. During the original audition, Mellamphy thought that the developers wanted him to portray an Irish Republican Army member. Mellamphy discovered Sean's fate about halfway through production while recording audio work. He described the character as the player's "little brother".

Eurogamer's Cian Maher described Sean as the "best Irish character in a video game yet", praising the character over previous Irish characters in Rockstar games, such as Red Dead Redemption's Irish and Grand Theft Auto IV's McReary family. Maher also appreciated the historical accuracy of the character's heritage, citing the Great Famine and subsequent emigration to the United States in the 1840s.

=== Susan Grimshaw ===
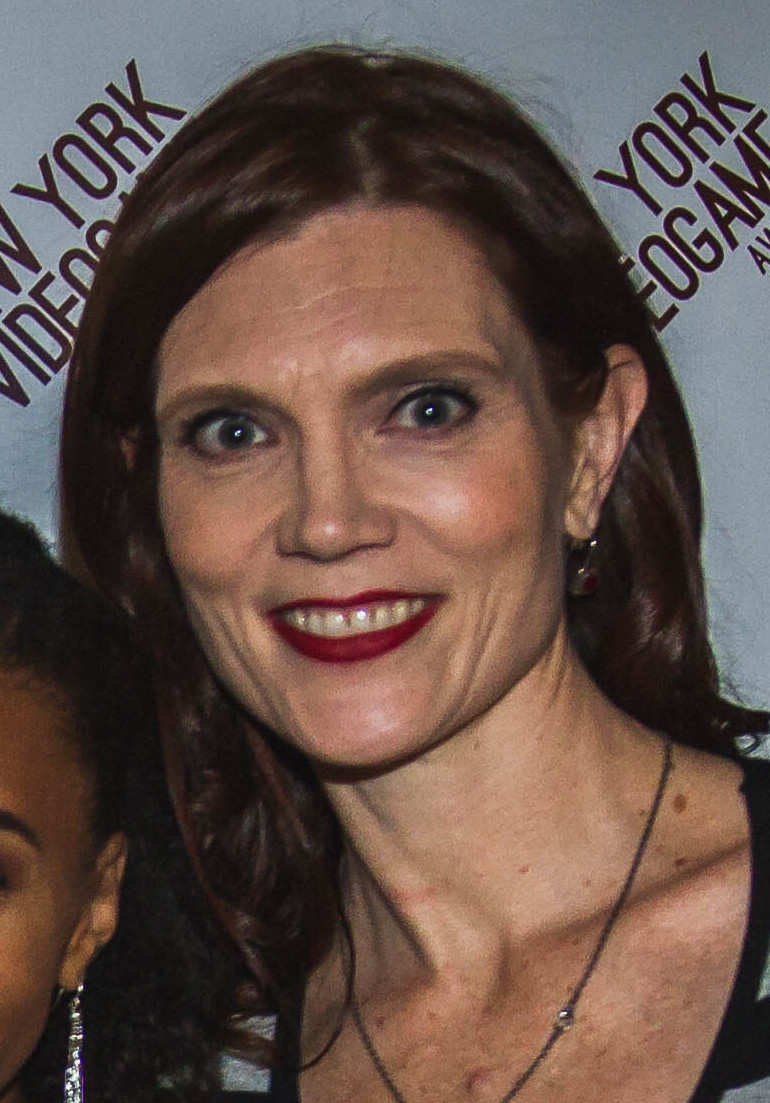
Kaili Vernoff played Susan Grimshaw in the game.

Susan Grimshaw (Kaili Vernoff) is the arbiter of the Van der Linde gang. Formerly in a relationship with Dutch, she has been a member of the gang for as long as Arthur has. After her and Dutch's relationship ended, the two have remained loyal partners. Stern, tenacious, and no-nonsense, she is a leader of the gang, ensuring that work is always completed. Alongside Pearson, she is responsible for setting up the camp following each relocation. When Tilly disappears from camp at Shady Belle, Grimshaw tasks Arthur to help investigate. They track her down to the hideout of the Foreman Brothers, storming the house, killing some of the gang members, and rescuing Tilly. After capturing Anthony Foreman, Grimshaw encourages Arthur to kill him. Sometime later, when Molly claims that she spoke to the Pinkertons about the gang's botched bank heist, Grimshaw shoots and kills Molly for breaking the rules. After the gang falls apart and Arthur reveals Micah to be the traitor, Grimshaw joins Arthur's side; when Grimshaw is distracted, Micah shoots and kills her. Her body is later buried by Charles.

Vernoff worked on the game for about four-and-a-half years. As production continued and she discovered more about the character, she wanted to ensure that she portrayed some of Grimshaw's vulnerabilities; as production continued, she was required to re-record some dialogue as she settled into the role. Vernoff enjoyed the juxtaposition of Grimshaw's character, noting that, despite her viciousness with the girls at camp, she "will go to any lengths to protect [them] and keep them from harm". She felt that Grimshaw was not initially likable to players, which made her more interesting to play. Vernoff felt that Grimshaw believed that the camp would not survive without her. Regarding the character's fate, Vernoff felt that Grimshaw was "defending her family and she wouldn't have it any other way".

Colin Campbell of Polygon described Grimshaw as a "walking cliché", noting that her strength exists only to offer support to the male hero, comparing her to Ma Ingalls in Little House on the Prairie and Mrs. Jorgensen in The Searchers.

=== Tilly Jackson ===
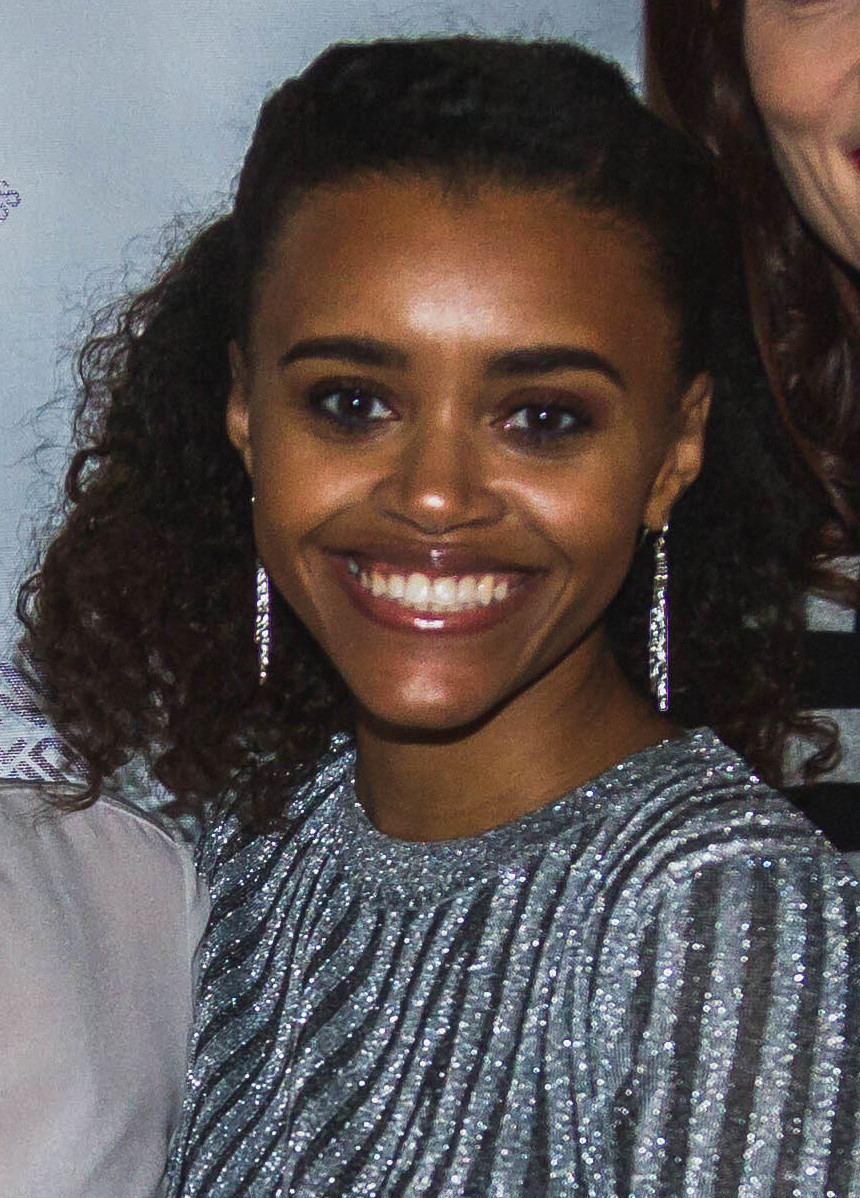
Meeya Davis was cast as Tilly Jackson.

Tilly Jackson (Meeya Davis-Glover) is a handmaiden of the Van der Linde gang. At the age of 12, she was kidnapped from her mother by the Foreman Brothers gang, with whom she ran for several years, enduring abuse. After killing one of the gang members, she fled, getting into more trouble until she was found by Dutch, who brought her into the gang and taught her how to read. Resilient and capable, Tilly is unafraid to speak her mind. She joins Arthur, Uncle, Karen, and Mary-Beth on a trip to explore Valentine, where she is hassled by a member of the Foreman Brothers until Arthur steps in. Sometime later, Tilly is kidnapped by the Foreman Brothers and taken to their safe house; she is rescued by Arthur and Grimshaw. After the gang falls apart and Pinkertons raid their camp, Tilly takes Jack and hides, later reunited with Abigail and Sadie. Eight years later, in 1907, Tilly lives in Saint Denis and has married a lawyer from Haiti, with whom she is having a daughter. She keeps in close contact with Mary-Beth.

Davis-Glover appreciated that the game featured a black woman standing up for herself. She became emotional during the scene in which Tilly discusses killing Anthony Foreman's cousin, noting that "at a young age [Tilly] went through so much". Davis-Glover was also pregnant when recording scenes of Tilly's pregnancy, but admitted that the writers did not intentionally make that connection.

=== Uncle ===
Uncle (John O'Creagh and James McBride) is one of the oldest members of the Van der Linde gang. He is a drunkard who claims to have had several wives and traveled significantly. He also claims to have been a talented gunslinger in his younger age, and contends that he suffers from terminal lumbago. During the events of the game, Uncle joins Arthur, Karen, Mary-Beth, and Tilly to Valentine, where he shows Arthur the local shop and shares with him a bottle of whiskey. Uncle later hears about a supposedly unguarded stagecoach of Leviticus Cornwall, which he robs alongside Arthur, Bill, and Charles; however, after dozens of Cornwall's men fight back, the four hide in a barn and are forced to fight to escape. He also later tells Arthur of a cattle rustling opportunity and discovers Molly at a bar in Saint Denis. When the gang begins to fall apart, Uncle decides to leave.

Eight years later, in 1907, Uncle reunites with John in Blackwater as the latter is buying a property. Uncle tracks down Charles, and the two help John build his ranch. After the house is built, Uncle is captured by the Skinner brothers and tortured, but soon rescued by John and Charles. He recovers and continues to work on the ranch. Four years later, during the events of Red Dead Redemption in 1911, Uncle poorly looks after John's farm in his absence; when soldiers and agents led by Edgar Ross later attack the ranch, Uncle joins John in defending it but is shot and killed.

O'Creagh was cast in the role of Uncle, replacing Spider Madison from Red Dead Redemption. O'Creagh died during production and was replaced by McBride; O'Creagh's singing lines still appear in the game. O'Creagh's Run, a lake located in the Ambarino region of the map, is named after him.

== Supporting characters ==
The gang encounters several allies throughout the game, including Arthur's former partner, Mary Linton (Julie Jesneck), Guarman rebellion leader Hercule Fontaine (Guyviaud Joseph), U.S. Infantry Captain Lyndon Monroe (Jake Silbermann), and lovers Beau Gray (Bjorn Thorstad) and Penelope Braithwaite (Alison Barton).

=== Downes family ===
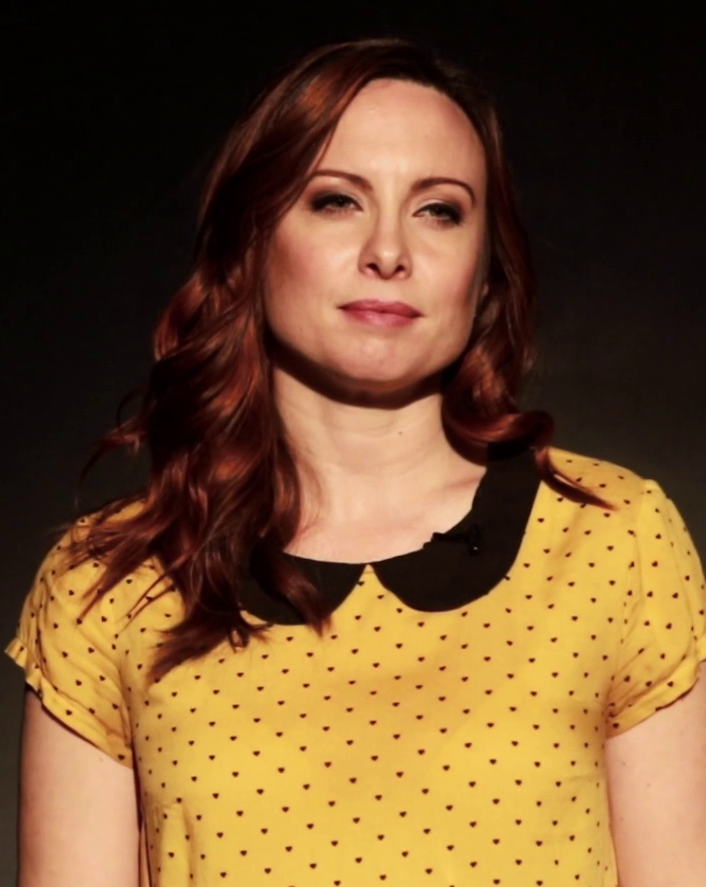
Jayme Lake portrayed Edith Downes in Red Dead Redemption 2.

The Downes family consists of Thomas (Peter Lettre) and Edith (Jayme Lake), and their son Archie (Paul Thode). Thomas obtained a loan from Leopold Strauss due to his financial problems; Arthur is sent to collect the loan and continually beats Thomas until Edith intervenes. After Thomas dies from tuberculosis, Arthur returns and collects the remainder of the loan from Edith. She and Archie move away from their home and eventually become financially unstable. Arthur is later diagnosed with tuberculosis, which he contracted from Thomas. Arthur encounters Edith prostituting in Saint Denis and Annesburg. After he saves her son from being bullied, Arthur goes to Edith, who blames him for Thomas's death, and persuades her to return home. Arthur offers her and Archie money and tells them to start a new life; after some persuasion, she accepts the money and advice, forgiving Arthur before leaving. Eight years later, in 1907, Edith and Archie own several businesses and appear wealthier.

Cade Onder of GameZone wrote that Arthur riding away from the Downes ranch on his first visit is "an interesting choice" by Rockstar to allow the player to "sit there and realize what you just did". Onder felt that Arthur's saving of Edith and Archie was an effective demonstration of his character arc after he is diagnosed with tuberculosis.

=== Eagle Flies ===
Eagle Flies (Jeremiah Bitsui) is the son of Rains Fall, the chieftain of the Wapiti Indians. Arthur helps Eagle Flies and his father on several occasions; after some time, Dutch also agrees to help, hoping that it will distract the Army away from the gang's activities. Dutch later works with Eagle Flies to trap soldiers in a valley to leave a message. When reinforcements attack the Indians, they are forced to fight back; while trying to rescue his friend Paytah, Eagle Flies is captured and taken to Fort Wallace. Arthur and Charles rescue him from the fort. During an attack against the Army, Eagle Flies is mortally wounded while saving Arthur from Colonel Favours. Arthur and Charles take him to his father at the reservation, where he succumbs to his wounds.

Bitsui worked on the game for about three years. IGN's Petty identified young warriors ignoring authority figures to follow their angry peers is a common theme in American tribal culture.

=== Rains Fall ===
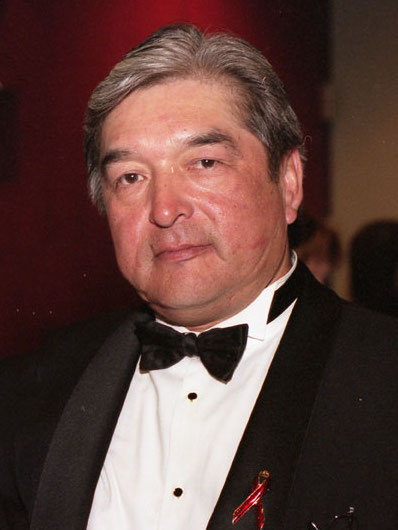
Graham Greene portrayed Rains Fall in Red Dead Redemption 2. Writer Dan Houser felt that Greene's role signified the game's focus on history and politics.

Rains Fall (Graham Greene) is the chieftain of the Wapiti Indians and the father of Eagle Flies. He first meets Arthur in Saint Denis, employing him to steal incriminating documents from Leviticus Cornwall's company, which is trying to move the Indians away from their reservation. Sometime later, Rains Fall rides to the gang's camp and pleads with his son and his men not to fight against the Army; they ignore his pleas, and Eagle Flies is mortally wounded. Arthur and Charles bring his body to Rains Fall, who weeps. Eight years later, in 1907, John can encounter Rains Fall, who tells him that his tribe was forced to flee to Canada.

Houser felt that Greene's role signified all of the game's important points, including history and politics, adding that Greene brought a "great depth" to the game's story. He described the character as a "gentle soul in [a] violent world".

== Antagonists ==
During the game, the gang's criminal acts bring them into conflict with various opposing forces, including the controversial Guarman ruler Colonel Alberto Fussar (Alfredo Narciso) and U.S. Army Colonel Henry Favours (Malachy Cleary). Along their travels, the gang becomes entangled in the warring Gray and Braithwaite families, primarily through their affiliations with Leigh Gray (Tim McGeever), the sheriff of Rhodes, and Catherine Braithwaite (Ellen Harvey), the matriarch of the Braithwaite family. Additional enemies in the game include the Del Lobo Gang, Laramie Gang, Lemoyne Raiders, Murfree Brood, and Skinner Brothers.

=== Pinkertons ===
The Pinkertons serve as Red Dead Redemption 2's main antagonists. They are hired by Leviticus Cornwall to apprehend the Van der Linde gang and protect his business from them. Securitas AB, the parent company of the modern-day Pinkerton agency, issued a cease and desist notice to Rockstar's parent company Take-Two Interactive on December 13, 2018, asserting Red Dead Redemption 2's use of the Pinkerton name and badge imagery was against their trademark and demanded royalties for each copy of the game sold or they would take legal action. Take-Two filed a complaint against Securitas on January 11, 2019, maintaining the Pinkerton name was strongly associated with the Wild West, and its use of the term did not infringe on the Pinkerton trademark. Take-Two sought a summary judgment to declare the use of Pinkerton in the game as allowed fair use. In response to Take-Two's complaint, Pinkerton president Jack Zahran described the game's portrayal of Pinkertons as "baseless" and "inaccurate", noting Pinkerton employees would "have to explain to their young game players why Red Dead Redemption 2 encourages people to murder Pinkertons", but hoped the companies could come to an "amicable solution". By April 2019, Securitas withdrew its claims and Take-Two moved to withdraw its complaint.

==== Andrew Milton ====
Agent Andrew Milton (John Hickok) is a high-ranking member of the Pinkerton Detective Agency. After unsuccessfully offering the Van der Linde gang chances to surrender Dutch in exchange for amnesty, he begins employing violent tactics against them, such as killing Hosea during the Saint Denis bank robbery and assaulting their hideout at Lakay with arsenal that includes a Gatling gun. Milton kidnaps Abigail from camp while the gang commits their final train robbery. Arthur and Sadie attempt to rescue her, but the latter is captured and the former is held at gunpoint by Milton, who reveals that Micah had betrayed the gang by turning informant. Arthur scuffles with Milton, losing as his tuberculosis weakens him, but Abigail breaks free and shoots Milton in the head, killing him.

According to Roger Clark, Milton's voice actor John Hickok is related to Wild Bill Hickok. The historian Robert Whitaker considered Milton's spying and infiltration reminiscent of the Pinkertons' techniques in real life, including their affiliation with the Molly Maguires, while he and Slate's Rebecca Onion compared Milton's violent techniques to the Pinkertons' 1875 raid on Zerelda James's farm and 1892 Homestead strike. Pinkerton president Jack Zahran considered the violence misrepresentative of Pinkertons' pursuit methods.

==== Edgar Ross ====
Agent Edgar Ross (Jim Bentley) is the right-hand man of Agent Milton. By 1907, Ross has become the local director of the Bureau of Investigation. He investigates Micah's murder, which leads to him tracking down John. During the events of Red Dead Redemption in 1911, Ross forces John to hunt down the remnants of his former gang before letting him return to his family ranch, and later kills him. Three years later, in 1914, the retired Ross is killed in a duel by Jack.

In Red Dead Redemption 2, Milton and Ross are first seen approaching Arthur and Jack as they are fishing. After Arthur refuses to cooperate, Ross mockingly tells Jack to enjoy fishing while he can, foreshadowing their final encounter in Red Dead Redemption. Ross represents civilization, the end of the Wild West, and government and police corruption during the era. Robert Whitaker compared Ross's methods of dealing with gangsters and shaping public perception on law enforcement to the tactics of J. Edgar Hoover. He wrote that "the duplicity, viciousness, and consistency of Edgar Ross's character makes him an incredibly effective villain, and also a deeply satisfying final enemy".

=== Angelo Bronte ===
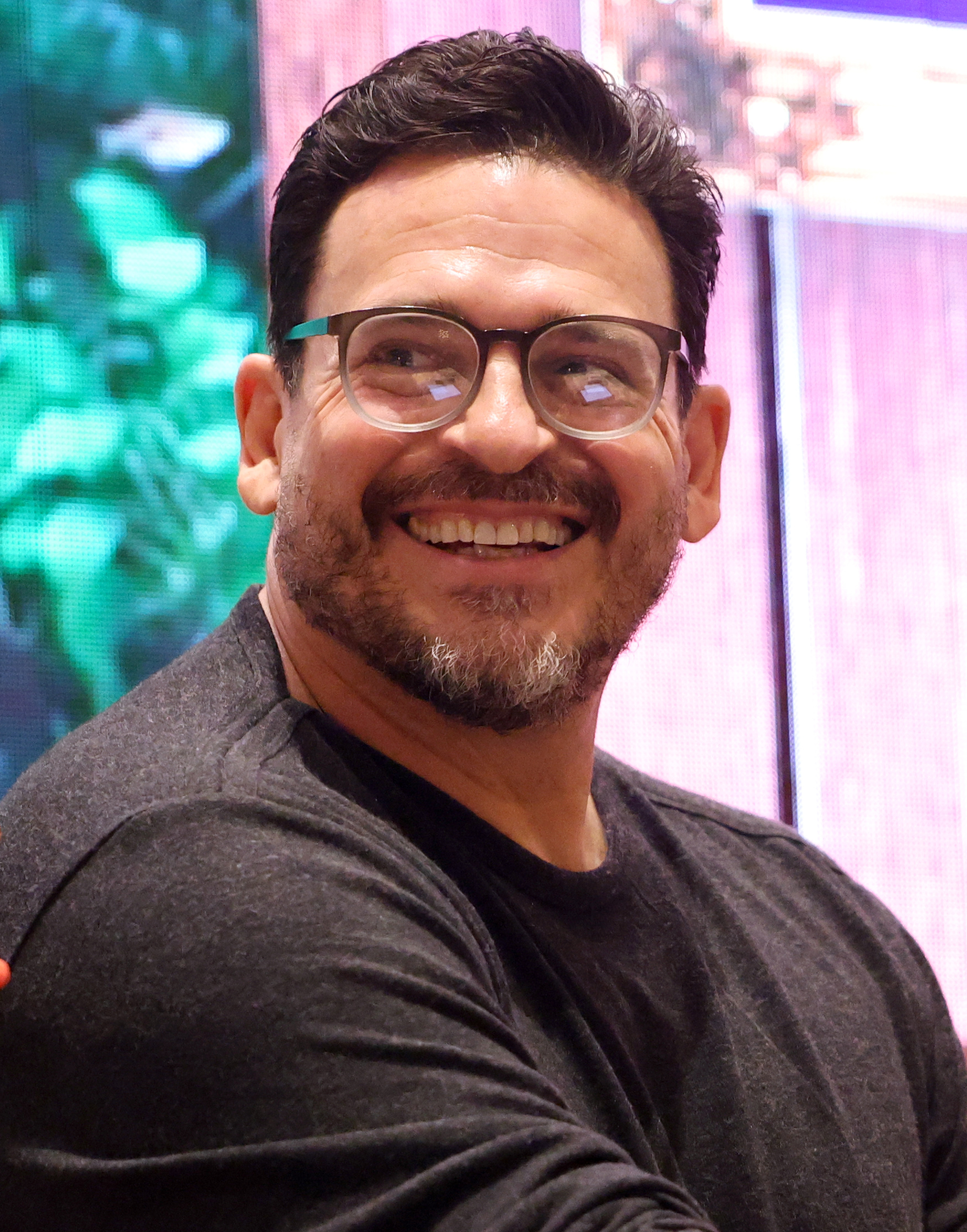
Jim Pirri portrayed Angelo Bronte.

Angelo Bronte (Jim Pirri) is a wealthy Italian businessman and crime lord from Saint Denis. Bronte bought Jack Marston from the Braithwaite family after the latter abducted him; Arthur, Dutch, and John meet with Bronte and orchestrate his safe return. Bronte informs Dutch about a wealth of money at the trolley station, giving his blessing to rob it. However, the heist is a trap; the money is minimal and police are awaiting the gang. After they escape, Dutch vows revenge on Bronte. With some other gang members, he assaults Bronte's mansion, capturing him and drowning him before feeding him to an alligator.

Benjamin Byron Davis claimed that the developer took some time to find an actor for Bronte before ultimately selecting Pirri. Davis felt that Bronte was the man that Dutch wanted to be, which led to the later events between the two.

=== Colm O'Driscoll ===
Colm O'Driscoll (Andrew Berg) is the leader of the O'Driscoll Boys, an Irish American outlaw gang and the rivals of the Van der Linde gang. Originally a friend of Dutch, they became enemies when Dutch killed Colm's brother and Colm killed Dutch's lover Annabelle in retaliation. Colm turned the O'Driscoll Boys into one of the largest and most dangerous gangs in America. He kidnaps Arthur while distracting Dutch with a fake truce, intending to use him as bait to capture the Van der Linde gang and turn them in to the Pinkertons, but Arthur escapes. Colm is later arrested and hanged in Saint Denis, after Dutch, Arthur and Sadie foil his attempt to escape his execution.

Colm's name is commonly mispronounced in the game based on the spelling. Sean is the only character to pronounce it correctly—in a way that sounds closer to the word "column"—and aggressively corrects Kieran over the pronunciation. Roger Clark, who is Irish American, stated his only regret in production was saying "Colm" incorrectly; he told Rockstar of the error, but they insisted he pronounce it otherwise. Upon the release of Red Dead Redemption 2, a man from Ireland sharing the same name as the character was reported to have received hate messages from players. The O'Driscoll Boys may have been based on the Dalton Gang.

=== Leviticus Cornwall ===
Leviticus Cornwall (John Rue) is a wealthy man responsible for several businesses. While the gang is hiding in the mountains, they rob a train belonging to Cornwall; in response, Cornwall funds and commissions the Pinkertons to bring down the gang. Cornwall tracks down Dutch in Valentine, holding John and Strauss as hostages and demanding Dutch to face him; he soon leaves, and Arthur and Dutch fight off his men. When some of the gang is on Guarma, they discover that Cornwall had close business ties with Fussar due to the island's sugar plantations. Cornwall is also responsible for driving the Wapiti Indians away from their reservations in search of oil. In Annesburg, Cornwall has a brief meeting with Pinkerton agents Milton and Ross, scolding them for their lack of progress in capturing the gang. Once the Pinkertons depart, Dutch approaches Cornwall; when Cornwall refuses his demands, Dutch shoots and kills him. His businesses continue to operate, but minimal oil was ultimately found on the Indian reservations, halting the operations.

IGN's Petty found Cornwall to be a parody of rich and powerful men of the era such as Andrew Carnegie, J. P. Morgan, and George Washington Vanderbilt II. Scholars Hilary Jane Locke and Thomas Mackay identified Cornwall as a metaphor for American capitalism, noting a resemblance with "robber barons" like Morgan and John D. Rockefeller.

== Reception ==
The characters received critical acclaim. GameSpot's Kallie Plagge wrote that the new characters in the game contribute significantly to the quality of the story. Mike Williams of USgamer felt that the secondary characters "feel like actual people" due to their varied personalities, and the player feels a closer connection when events occur in the game. IGN's Luke Reilly praised the cultural variety within the cast of characters and the game's avoidance of caricatures. Giant Bomb's Alex Navarro echoed this sentiment, noting that the characters possess humanity often lacking in other Rockstar games, particularly in the thoughtful portrayal of Arthur's internal conflicts. Keza MacDonald of The Guardian felt that the characters felt more believable due to the "excellent performances with unexpected range". Polygon's Chris Plante found the game's portrayal of Native American characters, inspired by a "mashing together of real-world people, locations, and groups into single entities", to be insensitive and confusing, but that the game's political commentary shined when focusing on the entitlement and power of the Braithwaite and Gray families. Campbell of Polygon considered many of the game's characters to be cliché, including Strauss as a "sinister money lender complete with a German accent" and Trelawny as "a gentleman thief with swell togs and a crisp English accent".

The introduction of Arthur Morgan as the protagonist was generally well received. Electronic Gaming Monthly's Nick Plessas found the journey of redemption for Arthur Morgan to be "far more redeeming" than John Marston's in Red Dead Redemption, noting that his sins heightened his sympathy for the character. Javy Gwaltney of Game Informer felt that Arthur was a better protagonist than Marston, particularly citing his overall development and character arc. Laurence Mozafari of Digital Spy also found Arthur a far better character than Marston, submitting that he had perfectly encapsulated the feeling of the Old West. Conversely, Eurogamer's Martin Robinson considered Arthur to be less compelling than Marston, leading to a confusing narrative as a result. Patrick Klepek noted a dissonance in Arthur's character inside and outside of the main story missions, making it difficult to connect with the game. Campbell of Polygon wrote that Arthur "barely registers as a coherent personality", rendering the overall narrative confusing.

The character performances also received praise, with Game Informer's Matt Bertz noting that they kept the story "grounded". Bill Lavoy of Shacknews felt that the quality of the voice acting made every character "distinct and believable". Dean Takahashi of VentureBeat described the performances of Benjamin Byron Davis and Roger Clark as "first-rate", praising the immersion of the acting and facial animation. Colm Ahern of VideoGamer.com similarly praised the two actors, noting that their performances "would feel at home in a top HBO drama". For his role as Arthur, Roger Clark won Best Performance at The Game Awards 2018, and was awarded gold from PlayStation Blog. He also received nominations at the 15th British Academy Games Awards, the 18th Annual NAVGTR Awards, and the 8th Annual New York Game Awards. Cali Elizabeth Moore was nominated for the Great White Way Award for Best Acting in a Game at the New York Game Awards for her portrayal of Abigail, while Alex McKenna was nominated for Performance in a Drama, Supporting at the NAVGTR Awards for her role as Sadie.

== Bibliography ==
- Locke, Hilary Jane; Mackay, Thomas Ashley (2021). ""You Are a True Progressive": Red Dead Redemption 2 and the Depiction and Reception of Progressive Era Politics". The Journal of the Gilded Age and Progressive Era. 20. Cambridge University Press: 174–193. doi:10.1017/S153778142000064X. S2CID 230642268.
- Price, James, ed. (October 26, 2018). Red Dead Redemption 2: The Complete Official Guide — Collector's Edition. United States of America: Piggyback. ISBN 978-1-911015-56-7.
- Whitaker, Robert (March 30, 2023). "The Last Enemy That Shall Be Considered: Law and Order in Red Dead". In Wills, John; Wright, Esther (eds.). Red Dead Redemption: History, Myth, and Violence in the Video Game West. University of Oklahoma Press. pp. 59–73. ISBN 978-0-8061-9185-0.
