= List of accolades received by Red Dead Redemption 2 =

Awards received by the 2018 video game Red Dead Redemption 2

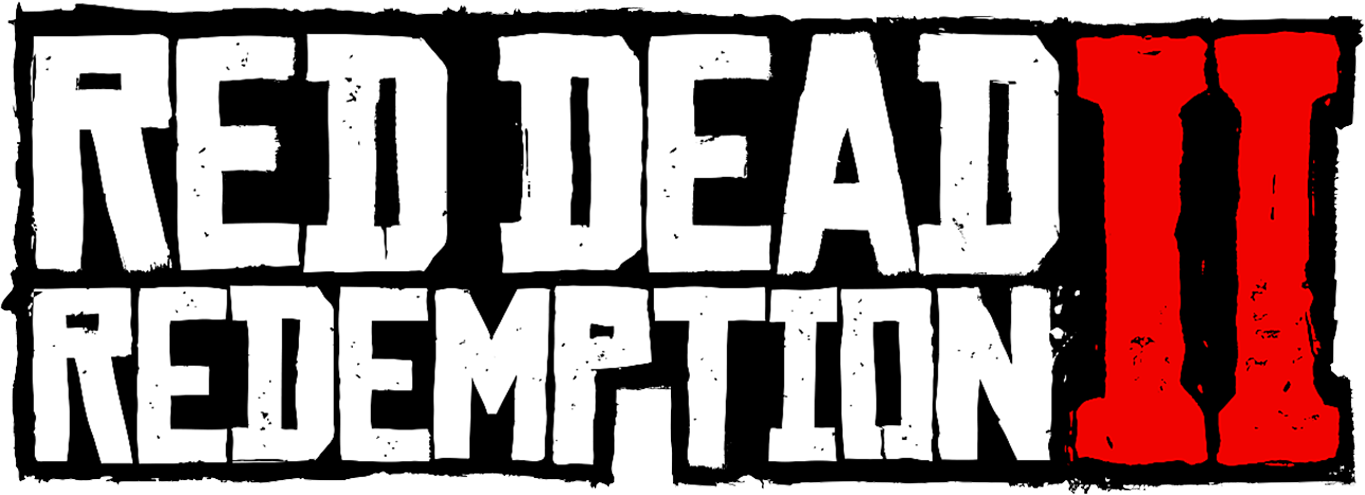
Awards and nominations
Award	Wins	Nominations
British Academy Games Awards	0	6
D.I.C.E. Awards	1	8
Dragon Awards	1	1
Game Audio Network Guild Awards	0	1
The Game Awards	4	10
Game Developers Choice Awards	1	7
Gamers' Choice Awards	1	2
Golden Joystick Awards	1	4
Guild of Music Supervisors Awards	1	1
Hollywood Music in Media Awards	1	2
Italian Video Game Awards	3	7
Japan Game Awards	1	1
New York Game Awards	2	6
The Steam Awards	3	3
SXSW Gaming Awards	3	8
Titanium Awards	3	6

Totals (Note: Certain award groups do not simply award one winner. They acknowledge several different recipients, have runners-up, and have third place. Since this is a specific recognition and is different from losing an award, runner-up mentions are considered wins in this award tally. For simplification and to avoid errors, each award in this list has been presumed to have had a prior nomination.)
- Wins: 25
- Nominations: 72

Red Dead Redemption 2 is a Western-themed 2018 action-adventure game developed and published by Rockstar Games. A prequel to the 2010 game Red Dead Redemption, the game is set in 1899 in a fictionalized representation of the Western, Midwestern and Southern United States and follows outlaw Arthur Morgan, a member of the Van der Linde gang. Arthur must deal with the decline of the Wild West whilst attempting to survive against government forces, rival gangs, and other enemies. The game was announced on October 18, 2016, and was widely anticipated. It was nominated for Most Anticipated Game at The Game Awards in 2016 and 2017, and for Most Wanted Game at the Golden Joystick Awards.

The game was released worldwide on October 26, 2018, for the PlayStation 4 and Xbox One consoles. Red Dead Redemption 2 received "universal acclaim" from critics, according to review aggregator Metacritic; it is one of the highest-rated games on Metacritic, and the highest-rated PlayStation 4 and Xbox One game alongside Rockstar's Grand Theft Auto V. The game had the largest opening weekend in the history of entertainment, making over US$725 million in three days, and had the second highest-grossing entertainment launch (behind Grand Theft Auto V). It set records for most pre-orders, largest first-day sales, and largest sales for the first three days in market on PlayStation Network.

Red Dead Redemption 2 won over 175 Game of the Year awards, receiving wins at the Australian Games Awards, Brazil Game Awards, Fun & Serious Game Festival, IGN Australia Select Awards, and Italian Video Game Awards, and from outlets such as 4Players, AusGamers, Complex, Digital Trends, Edge, Electronic Gaming Monthly, Gamereactor, GameSpot, The Guardian, Hot Press, news.com.au, Official Xbox Magazine, The Telegraph, USgamer, and Vulture; it was named runner-up by several other publications. The game was named among the best games of the 2010s by Entertainment.ie, The Hollywood Reporter, Metacritic, National Post, NME, Stuff, Thrillist, VG247, and Wired UK. Red Dead Redemption 2 was ranked among the best games of its generation by Game Informer, GamesRadar+, and IGN.

The game garnered awards and nominations in a variety of categories with particular praise for its story, performances, music, and graphical design. At The Game Awards 2018, the game received eight nominations and went on to win four awards: Best Audio Design, Best Narrative, Best Score/Music, and Best Performance for Roger Clark as Arthur Morgan. At IGN's Best of 2018, the game garnered seven nominations; it won two awards and was named runner-up in four (behind God of War). The game earned eight nominations at the 22nd Annual D.I.C.E. Awards, including Game of the Year. At the 6th SXSW Gaming Awards, Red Dead Redemption 2 was named the Trending Game of the Year and won for Excellence in SFX and Technical Achievement. The game received seven nominations at the 19th Game Developers Choice Awards, and six at the 15th British Academy Games Awards.

== Accolades ==
Award	Date	Category	Recipient(s) and nominee(s)	Result	Ref.
British Academy Games Awards	April 4, 2019	Best Game	Red Dead Redemption 2	Nominated	
British Academy Games Awards	April 4, 2019	Artistic Achievement	Red Dead Redemption 2	Nominated	
British Academy Games Awards	April 4, 2019	Audio Achievement	Red Dead Redemption 2	Nominated	
British Academy Games Awards	April 4, 2019	British Game	Red Dead Redemption 2	Nominated	
British Academy Games Awards	April 4, 2019	Narrative	Red Dead Redemption 2	Nominated	
British Academy Games Awards	April 4, 2019	Performer	Roger Clark as Arthur Morgan	Nominated	
D.I.C.E. Awards	February 14, 2019	Outstanding Technical Achievement	Rob Nelson, Imran Sarwar, Aaron Garbut, Phil Hooker, Stuart Petri, and Dave Hynd	Won	
D.I.C.E. Awards	February 14, 2019	Game of the Year	Sam Houser, Dan Houser, Rob Nelson, Aaron Garbut, and Phil Hooker	Nominated	
D.I.C.E. Awards	February 14, 2019	Adventure Game of the Year	Sam Houser, Dan Houser, Rob Nelson, Aaron Garbut, and Phil Hooker	Nominated	
D.I.C.E. Awards	February 14, 2019	Online Game of the Year	Josh Needleman, Tarek Hamad, and John Sripan	Nominated	
D.I.C.E. Awards	February 14, 2019	Outstanding Achievement in Game Direction	Sam Houser, Dan Houser, Aaron Garbut, Rob Nelson, and Phil Hooker	Nominated	
D.I.C.E. Awards	February 14, 2019	Outstanding Achievement in Animation	Jim Jagger and Mark Tennant	Nominated	
D.I.C.E. Awards	February 14, 2019	Outstanding Achievement in Art Direction	Aaron Garbut, Paul MacPherson, and Josh Bass	Nominated	
D.I.C.E. Awards	February 14, 2019	Outstanding Achievement in Character	Arthur Morgan (portrayed by Roger Clark; written by Dan Houser, Michael Unsworth, and Rupert Humphries)	Nominated	
Dragon Awards	September 2, 2019	Best Science Fiction or Fantasy PC / Console Game	Red Dead Redemption 2	Won	
Game Audio Network Guild Awards	March 21, 2019	G.A.N.G. / MAGFEST People's Choice Award	Red Dead Redemption 2	Nominated	
The Game Awards	December 1, 2016	Most Anticipated Game	Red Dead Redemption 2	Nominated	
The Game Awards	December 7, 2017	Most Anticipated Game	Red Dead Redemption 2	Nominated	
The Game Awards	December 6, 2018	Best Audio Design	Red Dead Redemption 2	Won	
The Game Awards	December 6, 2018	Best Narrative	Red Dead Redemption 2	Won	
The Game Awards	December 6, 2018	Best Performance	Roger Clark as Arthur Morgan	Won	
The Game Awards	December 6, 2018	Best Score/Music	Red Dead Redemption 2	Won	
The Game Awards	December 6, 2018	Game of the Year	Red Dead Redemption 2	Nominated	
The Game Awards	December 6, 2018	Best Action/Adventure Game	Red Dead Redemption 2	Nominated	
The Game Awards	December 6, 2018	Best Art Direction	Red Dead Redemption 2	Nominated	
The Game Awards	December 6, 2018	Best Game Direction	Red Dead Redemption 2	Nominated	
Game Developers Choice Awards	March 20, 2019	Best Technology	Red Dead Redemption 2	Won	
Game Developers Choice Awards	March 20, 2019	Game of the Year	Red Dead Redemption 2	Nominated	
Game Developers Choice Awards	March 20, 2019	Best Audio	Red Dead Redemption 2	Nominated	
Game Developers Choice Awards	March 20, 2019	Best Design	Red Dead Redemption 2	Nominated	
Game Developers Choice Awards	March 20, 2019	Best Narrative	Red Dead Redemption 2	Nominated	
Game Developers Choice Awards	March 20, 2019	Best Visual Art	Red Dead Redemption 2	Nominated	
Game Developers Choice Awards	March 20, 2019	Innovation Award	Red Dead Redemption 2	Nominated	
Gamers' Choice Awards	December 9, 2018	Fan Favorite Fall Release	Red Dead Redemption 2	Won	
Gamers' Choice Awards	December 9, 2018	Gaming Moment of the Year	Red Dead Redemption 2 has the biggest opening weekend of any entertainment property	Nominated	
Golden Joystick Awards	November 17, 2017	Most Wanted Game	Red Dead Redemption 2	Nominated	
Golden Joystick Awards	November 16, 2018	Critics Choice Award	Red Dead Redemption 2	Won	
Golden Joystick Awards	November 16, 2018	Ultimate Game of the Year	Red Dead Redemption 2	Nominated	
Golden Joystick Awards	November 15, 2019	Best Multiplayer Game	Red Dead Online	Nominated	
Guild of Music Supervisors Awards	February 13, 2019	Best Music Supervision in a Video Game	Ivan Pavlovich	Won	
Hollywood Music in Media Awards	November 20, 2019	Soundtrack Album	Red Dead Redemption 2 – VA OST	Won	
Hollywood Music in Media Awards	November 20, 2019	Original Song — Video Game	"That's the Way It Is", written and performed by Daniel Lanois	Nominated	
Italian Video Game Awards	April 12, 2019	Game of the Year	Red Dead Redemption 2	Won	
Italian Video Game Awards	April 12, 2019	Best Art Direction	Red Dead Redemption 2	Won	
Italian Video Game Awards	April 12, 2019	Best Audio	Red Dead Redemption 2	Won	
Italian Video Game Awards	April 12, 2019	Best Character	Arthur Morgan	Nominated	
Italian Video Game Awards	April 12, 2019	Best Game Design	Red Dead Redemption 2	Nominated	
Italian Video Game Awards	April 12, 2019	Best Narrative	Red Dead Redemption 2	Nominated	
Italian Video Game Awards	April 12, 2019	People's Choice	Red Dead Redemption 2	Nominated	
Japan Game Awards	September 12, 2019	Global Award, Foreign Product	Red Dead Redemption 2	Won	
New York Game Awards	January 22, 2019	Herman Melville Award for Best Writing	Red Dead Redemption 2	Won	
New York Game Awards	January 22, 2019	Statue of Liberty Award for Best World	Red Dead Redemption 2	Won	
New York Game Awards	January 22, 2019	Big Apple Award for Best Game of the Year	Red Dead Redemption 2	Nominated	
New York Game Awards	January 22, 2019	Great White Way Award for Best Acting in a Game	Roger Clark as Arthur Morgan	Nominated	
New York Game Awards	January 22, 2019	Great White Way Award for Best Acting in a Game	Cali Elizabeth Moore as Abigail Roberts	Nominated	
New York Game Awards	January 22, 2019	Tin Pan Alley Award for Best Music in a Game	Red Dead Redemption 2	Nominated	
The Steam Awards	January 3, 2021	Game of the Year	Red Dead Redemption 2	Won	
The Steam Awards	January 3, 2021	Outstanding Story-Rich Game	Red Dead Redemption 2	Won	
The Steam Awards	January 2, 2024	Labor of Love Award	Red Dead Redemption 2	Won	
SXSW Gaming Awards	March 16, 2019	Excellence in SFX	Red Dead Redemption 2	Won	
SXSW Gaming Awards	March 16, 2019	Excellence in Technical Achievement	Red Dead Redemption 2	Won	
SXSW Gaming Awards	March 16, 2019	Trending Game of the Year	Red Dead Redemption 2	Won	
SXSW Gaming Awards	March 16, 2019	Video Game of the Year	Red Dead Redemption 2	Nominated	
SXSW Gaming Awards	March 16, 2019	Excellence in Animation	Red Dead Redemption 2	Nominated	
SXSW Gaming Awards	March 16, 2019	Excellence in Design	Red Dead Redemption 2	Nominated	
SXSW Gaming Awards	March 16, 2019	Excellence in Musical Score	Red Dead Redemption 2	Nominated	
SXSW Gaming Awards	March 16, 2019	Excellence in Visual Achievement	Red Dead Redemption 2	Nominated	
Titanium Awards	December 10, 2018	Game of the Year	Red Dead Redemption 2	Won	
Titanium Awards	December 10, 2018	Best Game Design	Red Dead Redemption 2	Won	
Titanium Awards	December 10, 2018	Best Original Soundtrack	Woody Jackson	Won	
Titanium Awards	December 10, 2018	Best Adventure Game	Red Dead Redemption 2	Nominated	
Titanium Awards	December 10, 2018	Best Artistic Design	Red Dead Redemption 2	Nominated	
Titanium Awards	December 10, 2018	Best Narrative Design	Red Dead Redemption 2	Nominated	
