= Arthur Morgan =

Video game character

- Red Dead character
- First appearance: Red Dead Redemption 2 (2018)
- Created by: Rockstar Games
- Portrayed by: Roger Clark

In-universe information
- Affiliation: Van der Linde gang
- Children: Isaac
- Nationality: American

Arthur Morgan is a character and the main playable protagonist of the video game Red Dead Redemption 2. A high-ranking member of the Van der Linde gang, Arthur deals with the decline of the Wild West while attempting to survive against government forces and other adversaries in a fictionalized representation of the American frontier. He is portrayed by Roger Clark through performance capture.

Rockstar Games decided to focus the game on one character to follow him more personally, finding it more appropriate for a Western's narrative structure. Subverting narrative tropes, Arthur begins strong and has his worldview challenged. Clark wanted to play Arthur in a manner complex enough for the player to choose any path and still make sense. He took inspiration from actors such as Toshiro Mifune, John Wayne, and Rob Wiethoff, who played John Marston in the game and its predecessor.

Arthur received acclaim from critics, with his complexity and path to redemption most frequently the subject of praise. Reviewers lauded him for bringing the world and other characters to life, and ranked him among the most iconic video game characters. For his work, Clark accrued numerous nominations and was awarded Best Performance at the Game Awards.

== Creation ==
The development team at Rockstar Games determined that Red Dead Redemption 2 (2018) would feature one playable protagonist—unlike the three in their previous title, Grand Theft Auto V (2013)—to better understand how events affect him. They felt a Western's narrative structure necessitated a single perspective. Writer Dan Houser wanted to subvert the trope of protagonists starting weak and becoming stronger; Arthur is tough at the beginning and is "taken on a more intellectual roller coaster when his world view gets taken apart". The character was originally nastier in the game's opening, acting unsympathetic to his occasional girlfriend with whom he had recently lost a baby; Houser considered it more interesting for Arthur's redemptive arc, but it was reworked to make the character less hateable. Houser felt the American frontier's decline deeply affected Arthur, noting he is "caught between the nastiness of nature and the brutality of encroaching industrialization in civilization".

Actor Roger Clark portrayed Arthur. The performance capture process involved simultaneous recording of movement and speech, with a small part done in a voice-over booth. Clark's main inspiration was Toshiro Mifune, whose characters' stoic but humorous demeanor held intricacies he wanted in Arthur. He gained insight from The Proposition (2005) as it contained a similar character arc to Arthur's, and watched films like High Noon (1952) and the work of John Wayne; he viewed the Dollars Trilogy (1964–1966) but did not derive from Clint Eastwood's Man with No Name as he felt Arthur was more talkative. Clark regularly listened to Don Edwards's "Coyotes" (1993) during production.

Houser did not want to meet Clark on set to avoid hearing his real voice. Clark wanted his portrayal to be complex enough for the player to make decisions without them feeling uncharacteristic. He initially faced difficulty with this concept, as the high honor execution was different from the low honor, but he realized Arthur was someone who could easily contradict himself. Aiming to show the vulnerability of the character's ego, Clark observed that Arthur's resentment of John Marston for having a family fell apart as he eventually sought to help them. Rob Wiethoff's performance as John in the first game influenced his own. A second love interest for Arthur was cut for want of a desired effect.

== Appearances ==
Arthur is the main playable protagonist of Red Dead Redemption 2. His backstory establishes that he joined Dutch van der Linde's gang when he was fourteen, having lost his parents at a young age, and soon became Dutch's first protégé. Arthur had a son, Isaac, with a waitress named Eliza; he supported them financially until they were killed in a robbery. Over time, Arthur transformed into Dutch's most dedicated enforcer as they moved throughout the Western United States. When an unsuccessful ferry heist forces them to flee east across the mountains, Arthur helps to find supplies and later tracks down fellow gang member John Marston. He helps rob a train owned by oil tycoon Leviticus Cornwall and, after moving to Horseshoe Overlook, fights against Cornwall's hired mercenaries.

Leaving for Clemens Point, Arthur and the gang become involved in a conflict between two warring families, leading to the capture of John's son, Jack. Arthur retrieves Jack from the supervision of crime lord Angelo Bronte and helps retaliate against Bronte after he ushered them into a trap. Dutch drowns Bronte; Arthur finds Dutch's violent outburst uncharacteristic. In Saint Denis, a failed bank heist forces some gang members, including Arthur, out of town; they are shipwrecked on Guarma, an island near Cuba, and battle alongside a revolutionary in exchange for a ship to return home. Reuniting with the gang, Arthur resolves to save the now captured John, much to the disdain of Dutch. Shortly afterward, Arthur becomes ill and faints. A doctor diagnoses him with tuberculosis and recommends rest, but Arthur says he cannot. Upon saving John, Arthur reveals his doubts about Dutch, unable to accept his leader's growing obsessions. Aware his disease will eventually kill him, Arthur reflects on his decisions and morals, led further by his friendship with Native American leader Rains Fall. This drives his desire to protect the remnants of the gang, particularly John and his family.

Dutch seemingly abandons Arthur during an assault on an oil refinery and leaves John for dead when he is shot during a train robbery. When Dutch ignores Arthur's plea to rescue John's wife Abigail from Pinkerton detectives, Arthur disavows the gang. Upon rescuing Abigail, Arthur discovers that Micah Bell has betrayed the gang by acting as an informant for the Pinkertons. He returns to Dutch to inform him of this, but Dutch turns on Arthur and the newly returned John. As Pinkertons invade the camp, Arthur and John flee. At Arthur's insistence, John returns to his family. The vengeful Micah soon ambushes him, and Dutch intervenes. Arthur convinces Dutch to abandon Micah and leave. If the player has low honor, Arthur is executed by Micah; with high honor, he succumbs to his injuries and disease, dying peacefully while watching the sunrise.

== Reception ==
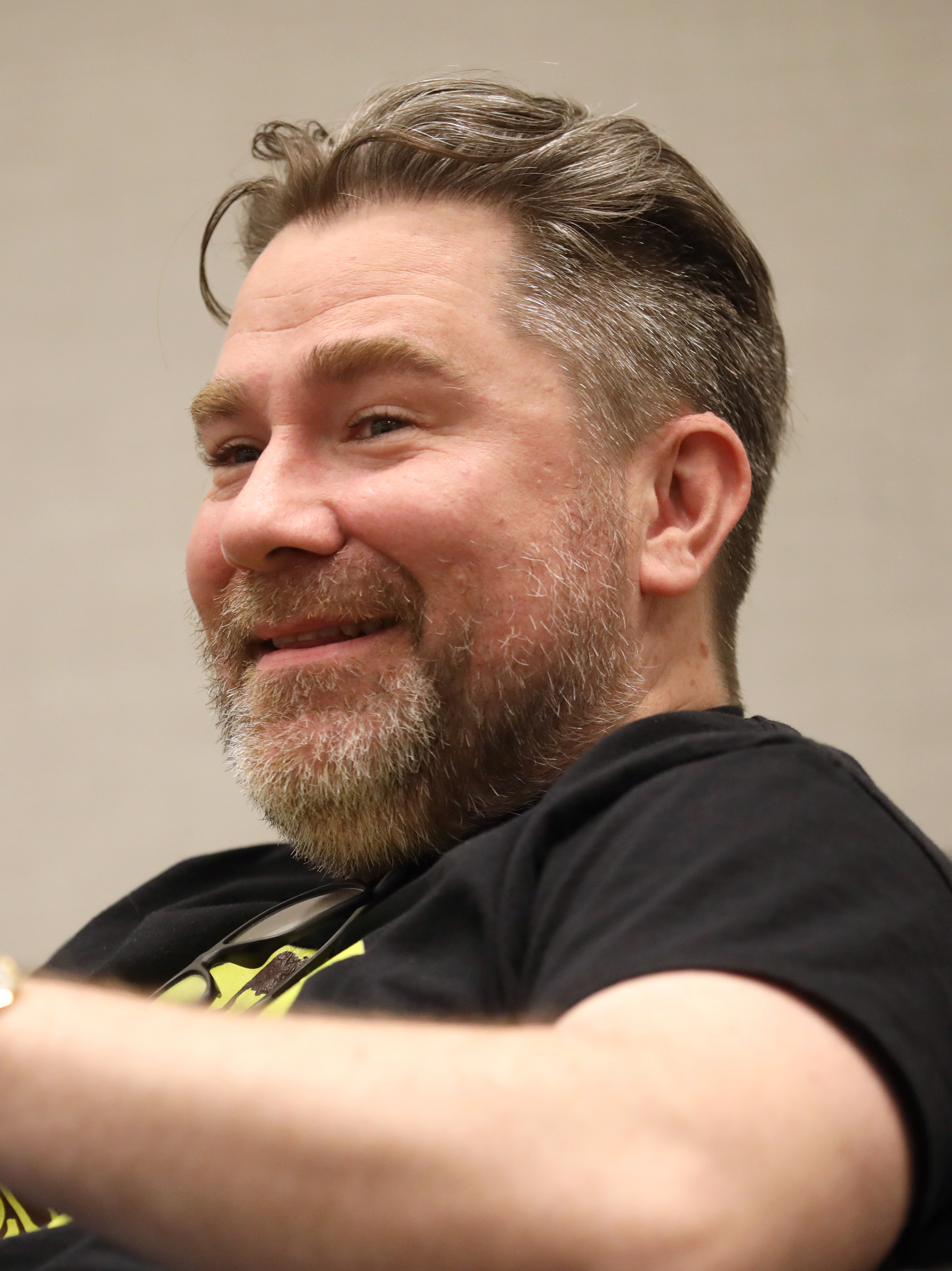
Roger Clark's performance as Arthur Morgan received praise from several gaming publications and awards ceremonies.

The character of Arthur Morgan received critical acclaim. Giant Bomb's Alex Navarro wrote that the thoughtful portrayal of Arthur's internal conflicts possessed humanity often lacking in Rockstar's other games. LevelSkip's Kyle Atwood called him a "character of tragedy and, most importantly, humanity". Kotaku's Kirk Hamilton opined that Arthur initially seemed unremarkable but became more intriguing because of Clark's performance. Ars Technica's Daniel Starkey felt that, while Arthur's story can be considered "poignant and memorable", some may see it as a typical tale about a "'bad man' who isn't necessarily in control".

GamesRadar+'s Tom Power believed the account of Arthur's life in Red Dead Redemption 2 reflected a Shakespearean tragedy, with various chapters representing the five stages of grief. Electronic Gaming Monthly's Nick Plessas found his journey "far more redeeming" than John Marston's in Red Dead Redemption, noting Arthur's shortcomings evoked a sense of sympathy. Game Informer's Javy Gwaltney echoed this sentiment, describing the arc as a "fantastic take on memento mori and how ruthlessly messy and complex redemption can be". Conversely, Eurogamer's Martin Robinson considered Arthur less compelling than John, thus confusing his experience.

The Guardian's Paul Walker-Emig thought Arthur's journal made him appear "like a real person with his own inner life, rather than a puppet who does our bidding", and The Mary Sue's Madeline Carpou lauded the journal for demonstrating Arthur's sensitive personality. The New York Times's Peter Suderman felt the player connected with Arthur "because his choices are, in fact, your own", and Paste's Holly Green respected Arthur's awareness of his own faults and misdeeds. Digital Spy's Laurence Mozafari submitted that Arthur perfectly encapsulated the feeling of the Old West. VentureBeat's Dean Takahashi praised Clark's contribution for adding immersion to the game and depth to his character. IGN's Luke Reilly hailed Arthur's voice as having an "infectious authenticity", and Destructoid's Noelle Warner found it made him a "quintessential southern American country boy".

For his role, Clark won Best Performance at the Game Awards 2018, and was a runner-up for the same category at PlayStation Blog; he also received nominations at the 15th British Academy Games Awards, NAVGTR Awards, and New York Game Awards. Arthur was nominated at the 22nd Annual D.I.C.E. Awards and Italian Video Game Awards. In November 2021, GamesRadar+ ranked Arthur 29th on its list of iconic video game characters, citing the character's ability to "bring a nourishing sense of humanity to almost everything he does". In May 2022, GamingBolt named Arthur the best video game protagonist of all time, praising the writing, Clark's performance, and the character's personal narrative and relationships. In 2024, Arthur was ranked the eleventh most iconic game character in a poll with over 4,000 respondents by BAFTA.
