= Roger Clark (actor, born 1978) =

Irish-American actor

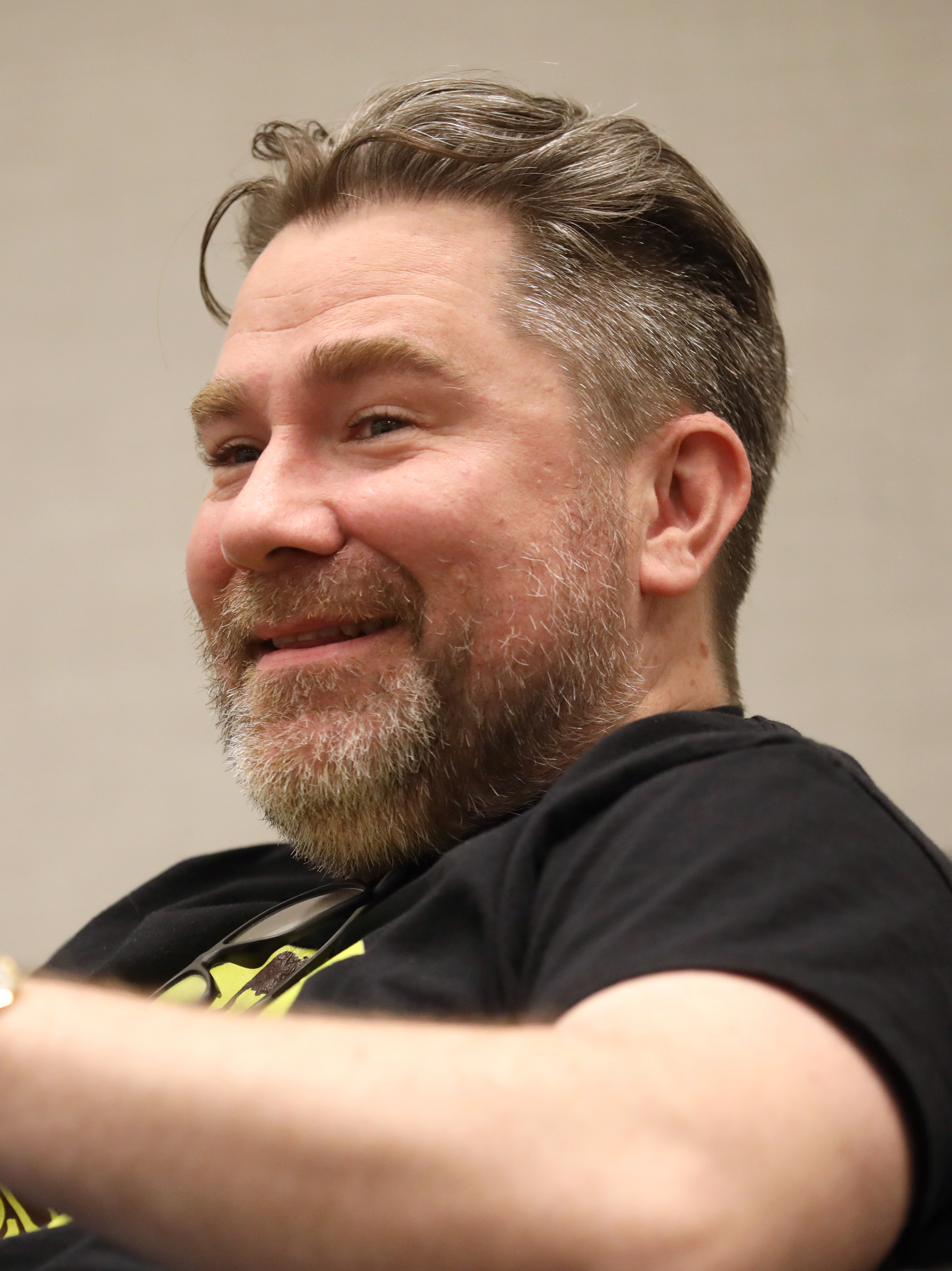
- Clark in 2024
- Born: July 14, 1978 (age 48); United States
- Citizenship: American; Irish
- Education: University of Glamorgan
- Occupations: Actor; voice actor
- Years active: 2000–present
- Spouse: Molly Clark (m. 2014)
- Children: 2

Roger Clark (born July 14, 1978) is an Irish-American actor and voice actor. He is best known for portraying Arthur Morgan through performance capture in the 2018 video game Red Dead Redemption 2, a role which garnered him critical acclaim and numerous accolades.

== Early life ==
Roger Clark was born on July 14, 1978, in the United States, the son of an Irish mother and an Irish American father. The family spent each summer vacationing in his mother's hometown of Sligo in Ireland. When he was 12 years old, the family permanently moved to Sligo, where he later completed his Leaving Certificate. He later moved to Wales to study theatre, media, and drama at the University of Glamorgan. After living and working in London for several years, he relocated to New York City in the early 2010s.

== Career ==
Clark provided the performance capture for Arthur Morgan, the protagonist of the 2018 video game Red Dead Redemption 2. His performance earned him numerous awards and nominations. He also has a successful stage career and has narrated more than 180 audiobooks.

== Personal life ==
Clark has dual American and Irish citizenship. He married his wife, Molly, on April 25, 2014. They have two sons.

== Filmography ==
=== Film ===
Year	Title	Role	Notes
2009	Max & Helena	Narrator	Short
2013	Good	Narrator	Short
2013	The Pervenche Game	Narrator	Short
2014	A Midsummer Night's Dream	Duke Theseus	
2016	A Writer's Retreat	Randolph Blythe	Short
2017	Float	Roger	Short
2018	Happy Birthday to Me	The Boss	Short
2019	Rawmouth	Guard #1	Short
2022	Hazardous	Roger	Short
2022	Bunker	Cpl. Miller	
2023	A Death To Die For	Brian McNeely	Short
2024	Damn Handy	Roger	Short
2025	Round the Decay	Whelan Newport	
2025	The Red Admiral	—N/a	
2025	A Debt to Die For	Brian McNeely	Short

=== Television ===
Year	Title	Role	Notes
2005	I Shouldn't Be Alive	Brad	Episode: "Shark Survivor"
2006	Perfect Disaster	Chuck Brewer	Episode: "Super Typhoon"
2007	The Wild West	Captain Weir	Episode: "Custer's Last Stand"
2008	True Heroes	—N/a	Episode: "Death Trap"
2011	Thor & Loki: Blood Brothers	Various characters (voice)	Episode: "Part 1 & 4"
2013	Zero Hour	Patron	Episode: "Chain"

=== Video games ===
Year	Title	Role	Notes
2009	Shellshock 2: Blood Trails	Sgt. Jack Griffin / Zombies	Voice
2014	Smite	Dreamweaver Ganesha	Voice
2018	Red Dead Redemption 2	Arthur Morgan	Performance capture
2021	Back 4 Blood	Additional cast	Voice
2022	Tactics Ogre: Reborn	Additional voices	Voice; English version
2023	Fort Solis	Jack Leary	Performance capture
2025	Rosewater	Phillip Boylan / Timothy King / Thug	Voice
2026	Marathon	General Davic Reed	Voice
2026	Starfinder: Afterlight	Narrator	Voice
TBA	Evolutis: Duality	Ricky Peril	Voice

== Awards and honors ==
Year	Award	Category	Work	Result
2018	The Game Awards	Best Performance	Red Dead Redemption 2	Won
2019	New York Game Awards	Best Acting in a Game	Red Dead Redemption 2	Nominated
2019	NAVGTR Awards	Performance in a Drama	Red Dead Redemption 2	Nominated
2019	D.I.C.E. Awards	Outstanding Achievement in Character	Red Dead Redemption 2	Nominated
2019	British Academy Games Awards	Performer	Red Dead Redemption 2	Nominated
