= Comic Con Liverpool =

Fan convention in Liverpool, England

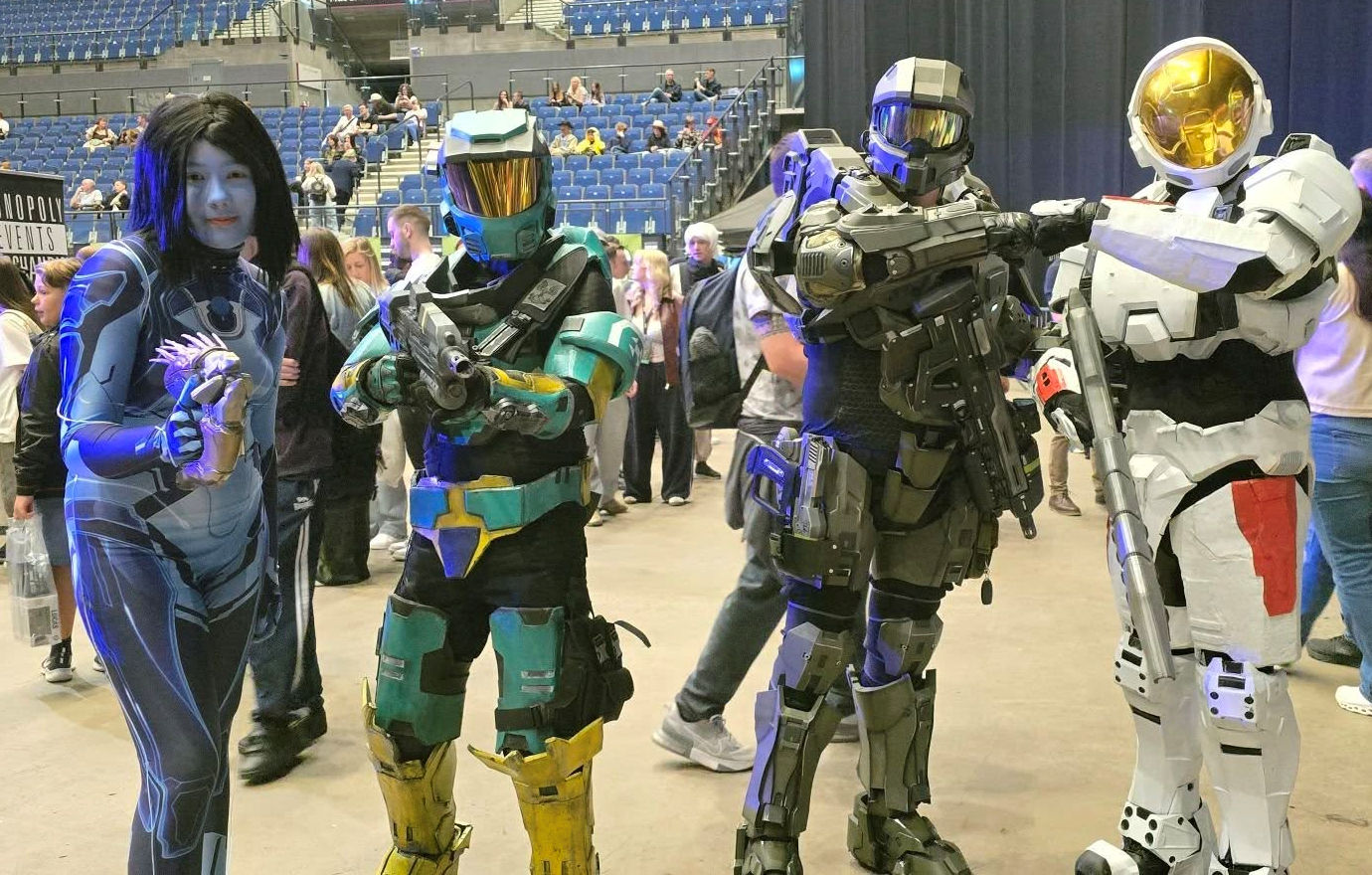
- Cosplayers at Comic Con Liverpool in May 2026
- Status: Active
- Genre: Multigenre, covering popular culture elements including sci-fi, horror, fantasy, mainstream, wrestling and more
- Venue: Exhibition Centre Liverpool, Liverpool Experience Campus
- Locations: Liverpool, England
- Inaugurated: 10–11 March 2018
- Most recent: 10–11 October 2026
- Next event: 24–25 April 2027
- Attendance: 40,000k+ (May 2025 event)
- Organiser: Monopoly Events
- Website: www.comicconventionliverpool.co.uk

Comic Con Liverpool is a fan convention held twice per year in the city of Liverpool, England, attracting 40,000+ attendees across three large venues situated along the Liverpool waterfront, that celebrates films, popular culture, cult television, video gaming, anime, cosplay and comic books which is organised by UK Events company Monopoly Events.

== History and Organisation ==
Comic Con Liverpool began its annual run of events in 2018 after the Movie Comic Media (MCM) Expo Group ceased their own annual comic convention event in Liverpool after hosting it since 2015. Monopoly Events CEO Andy Kleek was approached by Exhibition Centre Liverpool who wanted to continue hosting an annual event for the people of the city and its surrounding areas.

Monopoly Events is a Manchester-based event organization company that specializes in events held in the North West of England and Scotland. Along with the Liverpool event, they are also responsible for organizing Comic Con Scotland, Comic Con Scotland Aberdeen, Comic Con Wales, Comic Con Manchester, Comic Con Northern Ireland, Comic Con North East, Comic Con Midlands Telford, Comic Con Midlands Birmingham, Comic Con London, Comic Con Ireland, For the Love of Wrestling, For the Love of Horror, For the Love of MMA, For the Love of Cosplay, For the Love of Darts, For the Love of Vampire Diaries, For the Love of Anime, For the Love of Time & Space, For the Love of Supernatural, For the Love of Retro, For the Love of The Force, For the Love of Time and Space, Comic Con Czech Republic, Comic Con Poland and formerly Comic Con Yorkshire, For the Love of Sci-Fi and For the Love of Fantasy, there are also plans for further expansion across the UK including organizing Comic Con South West, Comic Con South East and Comic Con East Anglia in the future.

Originally a three-day event, Monopoly Events reduced it to run over two consecutive days. The convention includes celebrity guest appearances from various film, television, video gaming, anime and comic book series including The Vampire Diaries, The Walking Dead, Cobra Kai, My Hero Academia, Overwatch, Doctor Who, Star Trek, Star Wars, Harry Potter, Red Dwarf, Stranger Things, The Lord of the Rings, Glee, Wednesday, Red Dead Redemption 2, Mighty Morphin Power Rangers, Genshin Impact, Shadowhunters, Sons of Anarchy, The Goonies, Supernatural, The Lost Boys, Doctor Who, Torchwood, Star Trek: Strange New Worlds, Pretty Little Liars, X-Men, The Office, The Flash, Ahsoka, Starship Troopers, Aliens, Bluey, Grimm, Smallville, Gen V, The X Files and many others.

The convention is run between three exhibition halls and an atrium which are opened out to become one large space, and as of the 2020 event, another mezzanine area, and three large auditoriums. In 2021 the event expanded again to include the adjoining ACC Liverpool. The main exhibition hall features a large dealers zone selling movie, comic, and science fiction related memorabilia, artwork, and collectibles as well as various film props and sets (something for which the Monopoly Events is famous for, making their event experiences very different from others like them within the UK), vehicles from different franchises, a four-screen LED which projects guest talk panels live from the auditoriums, celebrity guest professional photoshoots and autograph sessions, cosplay events, and other displays.

In 2018, at the very first Comic Con Liverpool hosted by Monopoly Events in March 2018, actor Verne Troyer made his last comic con appearance before his death just over a month later.

Future plans for Comic Con Liverpool include expansion out across all three venues within the M&S Bank Arena, incorporating a festival-style atmosphere, and increasing capacity dramatically.

== Venue ==
Comic Con Liverpool was held at Exhibition Centre Liverpool within the King's Docks, part of Liverpool's famous port area. As of November 2021, the event expanded into the adjoined ACC Liverpool due to the sheer growth of the event as a whole. As of October 2026, Comic Con Liverpool is now held at Liverpool Experience Campus due to the sheer growth of the event as a whole. Situated in the newly extended area were more guests, props and sets, and a children's activities area which included fairground attractions. At the same time organizers, Monopoly Events announced that they would begin hosting two events a year instead of one as per the previous years, one in May and another in November of each year due to overwhelming popularity. In 2023, these dates were altered to April and October. In 2024, these dates were altered back to May and November. In 2024, the event added a 3rd adjoined part of the venue, the M&S Bank Arena. In 2026, the date for November was switched back to October. In 2027, the date for May was switched back to April.

== 2023 SAG-AFTRA Strike ==
The SAG-AFTRA Strike of 2023, affected many fan conventions worldwide. During the strike, SAG guidelines for appearances at fan conventions had to be followed by both guests and the convention organisers. Whilst appearing at any event, guests were unable to discuss any past, present or future work projects as they would normally do when meeting fans, they were also unable to answer questions regarding work projects whilst on stage during Q&A panels. Event artwork had to be altered significantly so as to not display anything other than the actors actual facial likeness instead of including images of characters played while other issues included the actors not being allowed to have character images to sign for fans on their tables, and instead headshots were used. All of these changes marked a significant change from the normal comic convention experience.

== Show features ==
=== Celebrity guests ===
As with many other fan convention events, celebrity guests from past and present popular media are regularly invited to Comic Con Liverpool and are an extremely popular part of the event, posing for professional photographs with fans and providing autographs as well as giving fans the chance to meet them and chat in person. Monopoly Events is well known for bringing first-time guests to the UK, as well as guests that are from older cult film and television shows of past decades such as the 1980s and 1990s. Sometimes the celebrities involved will use their appearances to raise awareness and funds for a charity or cause important to them, while others use the opportunity to promote upcoming projects such as new films or television shows. The event has a history of featuring guests that have never appeared at a UK convention before such as Ralph Fiennes and Helena Bonham Carter, the same sell-out event that featured Carter, also featured Jensen Ackles and Misha Collins who sold out of tickets within days of going on sale.

=== Celebrity panels ===
Most, if not all, of the celebrity guests at Comic Con Liverpool appear on stage at some point throughout the course of the event, answering both host and fan questions alike. In previous years the stage was set up in the main exhibition hall where the other event features also took place, however, at the 2020 event, to cope with increased demand for seats, the panels were moved into three auditoriums with tiered seating for more comfort and to provide a more intimate experience for fans. The panels were streamed live from the auditoriums into the main exhibition halls onto four large LED screens hung above the center of the hall for other attendees to see.

=== Photographs ===
Comic Con Liverpool includes a professional photoshoot area where fans can have their photo taken with their favourite guest or guests before collecting them at the exit of the area. Some headliner guests (such as The Vampire Diaries stars Paul Wesley and Ian Somerhalder in October 2022 and April 2023 and Supernatural stars Jensen Ackles and Misha Collins as well as Helena Bonham Carter in October 2023), have their own exclusive area for photographs and autographs, this prevents queuing time and size issues and timeslots are issued for fans to be able to meet the guests.

=== Autographs ===
The event also includes an autograph area where celebrity guests from film and TV sign items for the public and spend a few minutes chatting with their fans.

=== Cosplay ===
A large part of the event is devoted to the cosplay hobby where members of the public are allowed, and encouraged, to take part in dressing up as characters from popular genres such as film and television. Cosplaying has become one of the most popular parts of many fan conventions around the world and can be used as a platform to showcase the costumer's latest handywork, to show devotion to their favourite characters, or engage in role-play with other cosplayers in the same series, as well as to meet new people with mutual interests as themselves. The Comic Con Liverpool event, like all of the Monopoly Events shows, hosts a cosplay competition every year with both adult and child participation encouraged and prizes given for the best costumes.

=== Prop and set exhibits ===
Visitors of Comic Con Liverpool can find exhibits such as, a full-sized X-wing fighter from Star Wars, the Tardis from Doctor Who, the DeLorean Time Machine from Back to the Future, a full-sized Peterbilt Truck from Transformers, a talking Falkor head from The NeverEnding Story film (which guests could sit atop of and have a photograph taken), as well as the Swamp of Sadness from the same film, Del Boy's flat from the cult British television show Only Fools and Horses, and much more.

New props and sets which have been introduced since the November 2022 event include, the Mystic Grill from The Vampire Diaries, the Cobra Kai dojo from Cobra Kai as well as the Myagi-Do dojo, the Fiat Cinquecento from The Inbetweeners, and more.

=== Retro gaming area and other attractions ===
Comic Con Liverpool has an area dedicated to retro gaming consoles for visitors to play, in 2020 the event moved this feature into a larger area upstairs and included tournaments and big-screen battles and races between gamers. In May 2022 new areas were created, offering the public opportunities to play tabletop board games, Dungeons & Dragons, Warhammer and more. April 2023 saw the introduction of eSports at the event, offering tournaments, live streaming and more.

=== Trader zone ===
Within the main ECL exhibition hall, there is a trader zone that contains hundreds of dealers selling film and television, comic and science fiction-related memorabilia, comics, games, artwork, toys, and collectibles. As of April 2023, a smaller "Artists and Makers" zone was added to the event in the ACC Liverpool foyer area, featuring arts and crafts for sale in a smaller area by independent artists and small businesses specialising in small handmade items.

=== Artists alley ===
The event has a large Artists Alley section which is situated inside the ECL Liverpool, where the public can meet published comic book artists and authors, and buy pieces of their work.

== Location, dates and notable guests ==
Dates	Location	Notable guests
10–11 March 2018	Exhibition Centre Liverpool	Dirk Benedict (first UK convention appearance), Lou Ferrigno, Verne Troyer (last ever convention appearance), Adam 'Edge' Copeland, Gail Kim, Manu Bennett, Paul McGann, Sophie Aldred, Ian McNeice (first UK convention appearance), Hattie Hayridge, Jorgito Vargas Jr. (first UK convention appearance), Jeremy Bulloch, Joonas Suotamo (first UK convention appearance), Spencer Wilding, Dave Taylor (first UK convention appearance), Nigel Parkinson
8–10 March 2019	Exhibition Centre Liverpool	Teri Hatcher (first UK convention appearance), Dean Cain, wrestler Sting (first UK convention appearance), Peter Facinelli, Sean Maher, Adam Baldwin, Burt Young (first UK convention appearance), Eric Roberts (first UK convention appearance), John Challis, Spencer Wilding, Jeff East, Azim Rizk (first UK convention appearance), Blake Foster, Jeff Parazzo, Zoë Robins (first UK convention appearance), Tracy Lynn Cruz (first UK convention appearance), Steve Cardenas, Selwyn Ward, Jason Faunt, Nico Greetham (first UK convention appearance), Michael Copon, Ciara Hanna (first UK convention appearance), Kevin Duhaney, Jason Narvy, Paul Schrier
6–8 March 2020	Exhibition Centre Liverpool	Elijah Wood, David Harbour, Lori Petty (first UK convention appearance), Ryan Hurst, Melissa Joan Hart (first UK convention appearance), Jenna Leigh Green (first UK convention appearance), Beth Broderick (first UK convention appearance), Frank Welker (first UK convention appearance), Peter Cullen (first UK convention appearance), Sophie McShera, Jamie Marchi (first UK convention appearance), J. Michael Tatum, Brandon McInnis, Monica Rial, Jen Cohn (first UK convention appearance), Lucie Pohl, Doug Cockle, Chris Klein (first UK convention appearance), Shannon Elizabeth (first UK convention appearance), Chris Owen (first UK convention appearance), Thomas Ian Nicholas (first UK convention appearance), Sam J. Jones, Brian Blessed, Karyn Parsons, Ross Bagley (first ever convention appearance), Noah Hathaway, Tami Stronach (first UK convention appearance), Jason David Frank (last UK convention appearance), Sophie McShera (first ever convention appearance), Erika Eleniak, Bob Gale, Stanislav Ianevski, Josh Herdman, John Challis, Sue Holderness, Philip Pope (first ever convention appearance)
13–14 November 2021	Exhibition Centre Liverpool	Daniel Gillies, Michael Malarkey, Charles Michael Davis, Zach Roerig, Sara Canning, Phoebe Tonkin, Kayla Ewell, Summer Fontana, Tom Hopper, Emmy Raver-Lampman, Dominic Purcell, Bonnie Wright, Michael Cudlitz, Steven Ogg, Chandler Riggs, Alec Utgoff, Tommy Flanagan, Kim Coates, Ron Perlman, Ryan Hurst, Mark Boone Jr., Jerome Flynn, Clive Russell, Henry Ian Cusick, Alan Ritchson, Ed Westwick, Ron Thomas, Sean Kanan, Darryl Vidal, Simon Bird, Joe Thomas, James Buckley, David Schaal, David Koechner, Kate Flannery, Tim Rose, Silas Carson, Paul Blake, Gwyneth Strong, Tessa Peake-Jones, Philip Pope, Vas Blackwood, Steve Cardenas, Carlos Ferro, Jeannie Bolet, Luci Christian, Alexis Tipton, Brittney Karbowski, Diane Youdale
21–22 May 2022	Exhibition Centre Liverpool	Candice King, Michael Trevino, Michael Malarkey, David Anders, Steven Krueger, Danielle Rose Russell, Summer Fontana, Peyton List, Martin Kove, Jacob Bertrand, Gianni DeCenzo, Courtney Henggeler, Vanessa Rubio, Joe Seo, Jesse Kove, Robin Lord Taylor, Sean Pertwee, Drew Powell, Michael Rooker, Peter Weller, Nolan North, Ian Ziering, Tara Reid, Nadia Hilker, Ross Marquand, Seth Gilliam, Dan Fogler, Laura Vandervoort, Sam Jones III, Matthew Morrison, Kevin McHale, Heather Morris, Max Adler, Josh Sussman, David Bradley, Peter Davison, Paul McGann, Eddie McClintock, Hero Fiennes Tiffin, Ricky Whittle, Barry Pearl, Michael Tucci, Kelly Ward, Jamie Donnelly, Dinah Manoff, Randal Kleiser, Joey Cramer, Andy Secombe, Tia Ballard, Clifford Chapin, Kristen McGuire, Felecia Angelle, Carolina Ravassa, Mark Lester
19–20 November 2022	Exhibition Centre Liverpool	Ian Somerhalder, Paul Wesley, Arielle Kebbel, Nathaniel Buzolic, Sebastian Roche, Riley Voelkel, Luke Evans, Katheryn Winnick, Charlie Hunnam, Ryan Hurst, Emilo Rivera, Taryn Manning, Gaten Matarazzo, Tom Wlaschiha, Raphael Luce, Gwydion Lashlee-Walton, Trey Best, Grant Goodman, Xolo Maridueña, Mary Mouser, Tanner Buchanan, Hannah Kepple, Annalisa Cochrane, Paul Walter Hauser, Paul Anderson, Chad Michael Murray, Peter Facinelli, Ashley Greene, Jackson Rathbone, Kellan Lutz, Lucas Grabeel, Giancarlo Esposito, Sam Witwer, Christian Navarro, James Marsters, Joey Pantoliano, Robert Davi, Bonnie Piesse, Emily Neves, Dawn M. Bennett, Jenny Yokobori, Amber Lee-Connors, Mara Wilson
1–2 April 2023	Exhibition Centre Liverpool	Matt Smith, Paddy Considine, Ian Somerhalder, Paul Wesley, Joseph Morgan, Persia White, David Harbour, Matthew Modine, Jamie Campbell Bower, Grace Van Dien, Alec Utgoff, Cameron Bright, Christopher Heyerdahl, Taylor Lautner, Christopher Mintz-Plasse, Emma Myers, Hunter Doohan, Victor Dorobantu, Jason Patric, Corey Feldman, Jamison Newlander, Mark Williams, Michelle Gomez, Josh Dallas, Alex Hogh Andersen, Peter Serafinowicz, Richard Harmon, Steven Ogg, Roger Clark, Rob Wiethoff, Benjamin Byron Davis, Alex McKenna, G. W. Bailey, Lance Kinsey, Linda Larkin, Jonathan Freeman, Zachary Gordon
21–22 October 2023	Exhibition Centre Liverpool	Helena Bonham Carter, Jensen Ackles, Misha Collins, Bella Ramsey, Simon Pegg, Nick Frost, Gwendoline Christie, Alexander Ludwig, Amy Jo Johnson, Annabelle Davis, Cary Elwes, Charlie Heaton, Cooper Andrews, Danielle Campbell, David Labrava, DJ Qualls, Eduardo Franco, Gabriella Pizzolo, Gabriel Luna, Georgie Farmer, Harrison Davis, Jamie McShane, Joseph Morgan, Kat Graham, Mark Sheppard, Matt Ryan, Michael Ironside, Mick Foley, Natalia Dyer, Nell Campbell, Persia White, Ruth Connell, Samantha Smith, Sean Maguire, Shameik Moore, Tom Payne, Warwick Davis
4–5 May 2024	Exhibition Centre Liverpool	Orlando Bloom, Elijah Wood, Andy Serkis, Sean Astin, Dominic Monaghan, Billy Boyd, Jared Padalecki, Mark Sheppard, John Cleese, Kevin Smith, Jason Mewes, Jennifer Schwalbach Smith, Katey Sagal, Martha Plimpton, Kerri Green, Costas Mandylor, Dominic Sherwood, Matthew Daddario, Alan van Sprang, Craig Fairbrass, Geoff Bell, Billy Wirth, Jamison Newlander, Charisma Carpenter, Jim Cummings, Walter Jones, David Yost, Tim Downie, Tracy Wiles, Tami Stronach, Craig Charles, Chris Barrie, Danny John-Jules, Robert Llewellyn, Hattie Hayridge, Erika Harlacher, Sarah Miller-Crews, Jimmy Vee, Mike Quinn, Paul Blake, Tim Rose, Alan Ruscoe, Brian Muir
9–10 November 2024	Exhibition Centre Liverpool	Ralph Fiennes, Jason Isaacs, Rupert Grint, Warwick Davis, Mark Williams, Chris Rankin, Harry Melling, Devon Murray, Jessie Cave, Nick Moran, Sebastian Stan, Liv Tyler, Craig Parker, Miranda Otto, Jim Beaver, Felicia Day, Alaina Huffman, Mark Pellegrino, David Haydn-Jones, Elliot Page, Brandon Routh, Matt Ryan, Freya Allan, Ricky Tomlinson, Nadji Jeter, Steve Whitmire, Neil Newbon, Jennifer English, Devora Wilde, Theo Solomon, Aliona Baranova, Peyton List, Babs Olusanmokun, Melissa Navia, John Barrowman, Gareth David-Lloyd, Kai Owen, Lucas Grabeel, Troian Bellisario, Keegan Allen, Sasha Pieterse, Tyler Blackburn, Zach Galligan & Gizmo, Alex Vincent, Annabelle Davis, Peggy (a.k.a. Dogpool)
3–4 May 2025	Exhibition Centre Liverpool	Hayden Christensen, Rosario Dawson, Eman Esfandi, Ralph Macchio, William Zabka, Bryce Dallas Howard, Grant Gustin, Danielle Panabaker, Tom Cavanagh, Shantel VanSanten, James McAvoy, Ioan Gruffudd, Michael Chiklis, Aaron Moten, Jon Heder, Efren Ramirez, Rainn Wilson, Leslie David Baker, Kate Flannery, Cameron Monaghan, Emily Swallow, Jamie Campbell Bower, Paul Reiser, Jenette Goldstein, Mark Rolston, William Hope, Daniel Kash, Ricco Ross, John Hannah, Jonathan Hyde, Dirk Benedict, Denise Richards, Casper Van Dien, Dina Meyer, Michael Ironside, Jake Busey, Patrick Muldoon, Richard Chaves, Rex Smith, Michael Winslow, Jack Veal, Leigh Francis, Emmanuel Sonubi
15–16 November 2025	Exhibition Centre Liverpool	Brie Larson, John Cena, Freddie Stroma, Emilia Clarke, Iain Glen, Kristian Nairn, Katee Sackhoff, Temuera Morrison, Daniel Logan, John Boyega, Joonas Suotamo, Genevieve O'Reilly, Alastair Mackenzie, Kyle Soller, Alistair Petrie, Geena Davis, Heather Graham, Elisabeth Shue, Luis Guzmán, Georgie Farmer, Jennifer Grey, Kat Graham, David Giuntoli, Elizabeth Tulloch, Tom Welling, Michael Rosenbaum, Erica Durance, Laura Vandervoort, John Schneider, Aaron Ashmore, Eric Johnson, Sarah Drew, Miriam Margolyes, Christian Coulson, Julie Benz, Samantha Béart, Devora Wilde, Maggie Robertson, April Stewart, Mona Marshall, David McCormack, Melanie Zanetti, Eliza Taylor, Bob Morley, Ted DiBiase, Matt King, Robert Wuhl, Tony Robinson
2–3 May 2026	Exhibition Centre Liverpool	Noah Schnapp, Caleb McLaughlin, Priah Ferguson, Nell Fisher, Jake Connelly, Amybeth McNulty, Shannon Purser, Cara Buono, Joe Chrest, Matt Smith, Karen Gillan, Arthur Darvill, William Shatner, Gillian Anderson, Annabeth Gish, Nicholas Lea, Brian Thompson, Yuji Okumoto, Robyn Lively, Dallas Dupree Young, Griffin Santopietro, Alicia Hannah-Kim, Brandon H. Lee, Alicia Silverstone, Dexter Sol Ansell, Taylor Schilling, Laura Prepon, Dascha Polanco, Cal Dodd, George Buza, Lenore Zann, Ross Marquand, Taylor Gray, Tiya Sircar, Steven Ogg, Ned Luke, Shawn Fonteno, Billy West, Phil LaMarr, Peggy (a.k.a. Dogpool), Heather Matarazzo, Natalia Tena, Andy Linden, Emmett J. Scanlan, Mary Lynn Rajskub, Gil Bellows, Bart Johnson, Zach Galligan & Gizmo, Spencer Wilding
10–11 October 2026	Liverpool Experience Campus	Jude Law, David Harbour, Randy Havens, Christopher Lloyd, Harry Waters Jr., Donald "Don" Fullilove, Peter Capaldi, Christopher Eccleston, Catherine Tate, Jenna Coleman, Pearl Mackie, Emilia Clarke, John Bradley, Alfie Allen, Gemma Whelan, Jerome Flynn, Rory McCann, Tom Wlaschiha, Carice van Houten, Isaac Hempstead-Wright, Art Parkinson, Ellie Kendrick, Paul Kaye, Ian McElhinney, Daniel Portman, Vladimir Furdik, Eugene Simon, Maggie Siff, Lea Thompson, WWE Superstar Paige (a.k.a. Saraya Bevis), Jennifer Carpenter, David Zayas, Julie Benz, Erik King, Billy Zane, Mira Sorvino, Kevin Durand, Maggie Wheeler, Omari Hardwick, Rick Hoffman, Marie Avgeropoulos, Zach McGowan, Christopher Lambert, David Morrissey, Steven Bauer, Pam Grier, Nick Pauley (a.k.a. Dancepool), Geoff Hurst, Robin Shou, Linden Ashby, Sean Pertwee, Darren Morfitt, Joel David Moore, Tom McKay, Luke Dale, Josh Keaton, Matt Ryan, Spencer Wilding, Tim McInnerny, Alan Fletcher
24–25 April 2027	Liverpool Experience Campus	

== See also ==
- List of comic book conventions
- Comic book convention
- List of multigenre conventions
