= Imagine (song) =

1971 single by John Lennon

- UK picture sleeve

Single by John Lennon

from the album Imagine
- B-side: "It's So Hard"
- Released: 11 October 1971
- Recorded: 27 May – 4 July 1971
- Studio: Ascot Sound, Ascot; Record Plant East, New York City
- Genre: Soft rock
- Length: 3:03
- Label: Apple
- Composer: John Lennon
- Lyricists: John Lennon; Yoko Ono (Note: The original single initially credited Lennon as the sole songwriter, as did Imagine in its liner notes. In 2017, the credits for its lyrics were revised by the National Music Publishers Association to include Ono.)
- Producers: John Lennon; Yoko Ono; Phil Spector

John Lennon US singles chronology
"Power to the People" (1971)	"Imagine" (1971)	"Happy Xmas (War Is Over)" (1971)

John Lennon UK singles chronology
"Stand by Me" (1975)	"Imagine" (1975)	"(Just Like) Starting Over" (1980)

Music video
- "IMAGINE. (Ultimate Mix, 2020) - John Lennon & The Plastic Ono Band (with the Flux Fiddlers) HD" on YouTube

"Imagine" is a song by the English musician John Lennon from his 1971 album of the same name. The lyrics encourage listeners to imagine a world of peace, beginning with living without religion and its concepts, without economic materialism, and without borders separating nations. Shortly before his death, Lennon said that much of the song's lyrics and content came from his wife, Yoko Ono; in 2017, she received credit as a co-writer.

Lennon and Ono co-produced the song with Phil Spector. Recording began at Lennon's home studio at Tittenhurst Park, England, in May 1971, with final overdubs taking place at the Record Plant, in New York City, during July. In October, Lennon released "Imagine" as a single in the United States, where it peaked at number one on the Record World Top 100, number two on the Cashbox Top 100 and number three on the Billboard Hot 100. The song was first issued as a single in Britain in 1975, to promote the compilation Shaved Fish, and reached number six on the UK Singles Chart that year. It later topped the chart following Lennon's murder in 1980.

"Imagine" has consistently been widely praised since its release, while also garnering controversy due to its lyrics. BMI named "Imagine" one of the 100 most performed songs of the 20th century. In 1999, it was ranked number 30 on the RIAA's list of the 365 "Songs of the Century", earned a Grammy Hall of Fame Award, and was inducted into the Rock and Roll Hall of Fame's "500 Songs that Shaped Rock and Roll". Rolling Stone ranked it number 3 in its 2004 list of the "500 Greatest Songs of All Time", repositioned to number 19 in the 2021 revision. Meanwhile, a UK survey conducted by the Guinness World Records British Hit Singles Book in 2002 named it the second-best single of all time. Since 2005, the song has been either played or performed in the final minutes leading up to the New Year's Times Square Ball Drop event in New York City. In 2023, the song was selected for preservation in the United States National Recording Registry by the Library of Congress as being "culturally, historically, or aesthetically significant".

"Imagine" is the best-selling single of Lennon's solo career. It has sold more than 1.7 million copies in the UK. More than 200 artists have performed or covered the song, including Madonna, Stevie Wonder, Joan Baez, Lady Gaga, David Bowie, Elton John, Dolly Parton, and Diana Ross. After "Imagine" was featured at the 2012 Summer Olympics, the song re-entered the UK Top 40, reaching number 18, and was presented as a theme song in the opening ceremony of the 2022 Winter Olympics. The song has remained a source of controversy since its initial release over its lyrics.

== Composition and writing ==
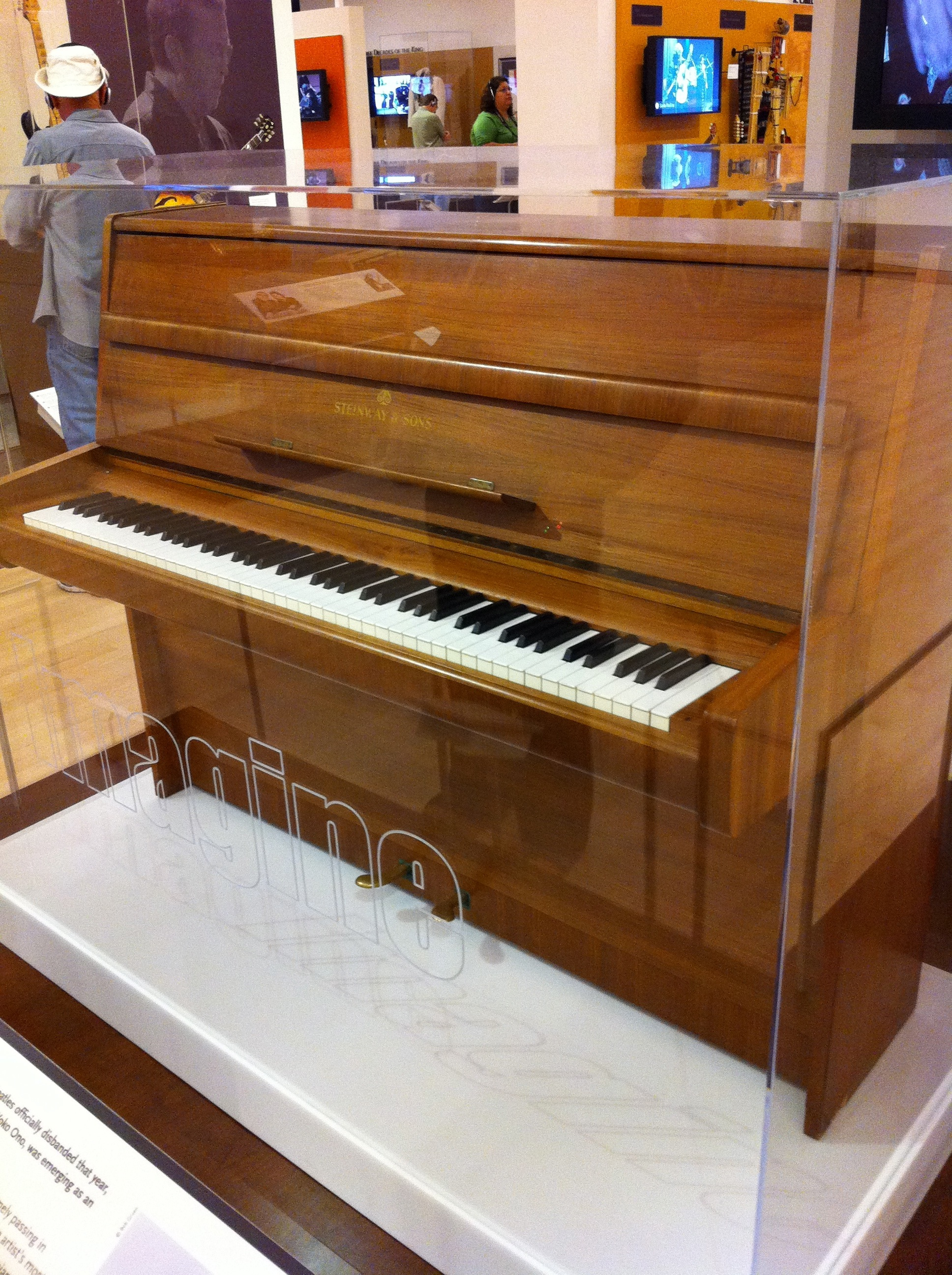
Lennon's Steinway piano, on which he composed "Imagine", was bought by singer George Michael in 2000 to keep it in the UK.

Several poems from Yoko Ono's 1964 book Grapefruit inspired Lennon to write the lyrics for "Imagine"—in particular, one which Capitol Records reproduced on the back cover of the original Imagine LP titled "Cloud Piece", reads: "Imagine the clouds dripping, dig a hole in your garden to put them in." Lennon later said the composition "should be credited as a Lennon/Ono song. A lot of it—the lyric and the concept—came from Yoko, but in those days I was a bit more selfish, a bit more macho, and I sort of omitted her contribution, but it was right out of Grapefruit." When asked about the song's meaning during a December 1980 interview with David Sheff for Playboy magazine, Lennon told Sheff that Dick Gregory had given Ono and him a Christian prayer book, which inspired the concept behind "Imagine".

The concept of positive prayer ... If you can imagine a world at peace, with no denominations of religion—not without religion but without this my God-is-bigger-than-your-God thing—then it can be true ... the World Church called me once and asked, "Can we use the lyrics to 'Imagine' and just change it to 'Imagine one religion'?" That showed [me] they didn't understand it at all. It would defeat the whole purpose of the song, the whole idea.

"Imagine"
An excerpt from the second chorus

With the combined influence of "Cloud Piece" and the prayer book given to him by Gregory, Lennon wrote what author John Blaney described as "a humanistic paean for the people". Blaney wrote, "Lennon contends that global harmony is within our reach, but only if we reject the mechanisms of social control that restrict human potential." Rolling Stone's David Fricke commented: "[Lennon] calls for a unity and equality built upon the complete elimination of modern social order: geopolitical borders, organised religion, [and] economic class."

Another possible source for the song has been documented by historian Sarah Carter. She wrote that it seems likely that John Lennon was aware of a protest by an Indigenous Canadian woman, Lillian Piché Shirt, in Edmonton, and Shirt herself later recounted how in 1969 Lennon and she chatted on radio. During the on-radio chat, she reportedly shared a saying told her by her grandmother "Keespin esa Kasakehetoyah, Kasetos-katoyah, Kawechehetoyah, Namoya Ka-no-tin-to-nanhoyo." ("Imagine that if, there was no hate, if we loved each other, we loved one another, that there would be no war between us").

Lennon stated, with hesitation, that "'Imagine', which says: 'Imagine that there was no more religion, no more country, no more politics,' is virtually The Communist Manifesto, even though I'm not particularly a Communist and I do not belong to any movement." He elaborated on this to NME, saying that "[t]here is no real Communist state in the world; you must realise that. The Socialism I speak about ... [is] not the way some daft Russian might do it, or the Chinese might do it." Ono, on the other hand, succinctly described the lyrical statement of "Imagine" as "just what John believed: that we are all one country, one world, one people." Rolling Stone described its lyrics as "22 lines of graceful, plain-spoken faith in the power of a world, united in purpose, to repair and change itself". (Note: The lyrical content of "Imagine" relates to Lennon's concept of Nutopia: The Country of Peace, which he invented in 1973. Lennon included a symbolically mute anthem to this country on his album Mind Games released later that year.)

An original piano musical motif, later called "John's Piano Piece", close to the final one was created in January 1969 during the Let It Be sessions. Lennon finished composing "Imagine" one morning in early 1971, on a Steinway piano, in a bedroom at his Tittenhurst Park estate in Ascot, Berkshire, England. Ono watched as he composed the melody, chord structure and almost all the lyrics, nearly completing the song in one brief writing session. Described as a piano ballad performed in the soft rock genre, the song is in the key of C major. Its 4-bar piano introduction begins with a C chord then moves to Cmaj7 before changing to F. Each repetition of this pattern is rounded with a short, distinctive piano riff that ascends chromatically from A to B. The 12-bar verses also follow this chord progression, with their last 4 bars moving from Am/E to Dm and Dm/C, finishing with G, G11 then G7, before resolving back to C. The 8-bar choruses progress from F to G to C, then Cmaj7 and E before ending on E7, a C chord substituted for E7 in the final bar. The 4-bar outro begins with F, then G, before resolving on C. With a duration of 3 minutes and 3 seconds and a time signature of 4/4, the song's tempo falls around 75 beats per minute.

== Recording and commercial reception ==
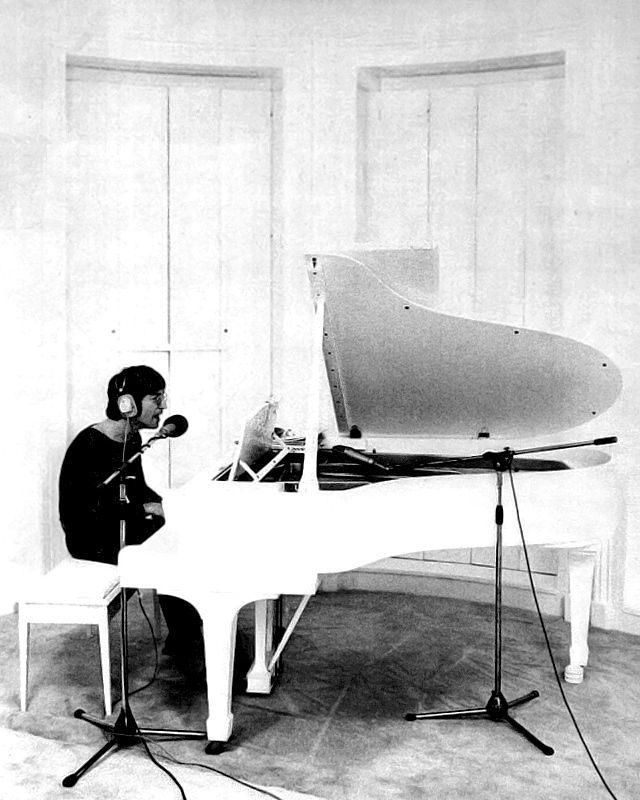
A 1971 Billboard advertisement for "Imagine"

Lennon and Ono co-produced the song and album with Phil Spector. Spector commented that with Lennon's intent in mind, he "knew what we were going to do ... It was going to be John making a political statement, but a very commercial one as well ... I always thought that 'Imagine' was like the national anthem." Lennon described his working arrangement with Ono and Spector: "Phil doesn't arrange or anything like that—[Ono] and Phil will just sit in the other room and shout comments like, 'Why don't you try this sound' or 'You're not playing the piano too well' ... I'll get the initial idea and ... we'll just find a sound from [there]."

Recording took place on 27 May 1971 at Ascot Sound Studios, Lennon's newly built home studio at Tittenhurst Park, with string overdubs taking place on 4 July 1971 at the Record Plant, in New York City. The sessions began during the late morning, running to just before dinner in the early evening. Lennon taught the musicians the chord progression and a working arrangement for "Imagine", rehearsing the song until he believed the musicians were ready to record. In his attempt to recreate Lennon's desired sound, Spector had some early tapings feature Lennon and Nicky Hopkins playing in different octaves on one piano. He also initially attempted to record the piano part with Lennon playing the white baby grand in the couple's all-white room. However, after having deemed the room's acoustics unsuitable, Spector abandoned the idea in favour of the superior environment of Lennon's home studio. They completed the session in minutes, recording three takes and choosing the second one for release. The finished recording featured Lennon on piano and vocal, Klaus Voormann on bass guitar, Alan White on drums and the Flux Fiddlers on strings. The string arrangement was written by Torrie Zito.

Issued by Apple Records in the United States in October 1971, "Imagine" became the best-selling single of Lennon's solo career. It peaked at number three on the Billboard Hot 100 and reached number one in Canada on the RPM national singles chart, remaining there for two weeks. Upon its release the song's lyrics upset some religious groups, particularly the line: "Imagine there's no heaven". When asked about the song during one of his final interviews, Lennon said he considered it to be as strong a composition as any he had written with the Beatles. He described the song's meaning and explicated its commercial appeal: "Anti-religious, anti-nationalistic, anti-conventional, anti-capitalistic, but because it is sugarcoated it is accepted ... Now I understand what you have to do. Put your political message across with a little honey." In an open letter to Paul McCartney published in Melody Maker, Lennon said that "Imagine" was "'Working Class Hero' with sugar on it for conservatives like yourself". On 30 November 1971, the Imagine LP reached number one on the UK chart. It became the most commercially successful and critically acclaimed album of Lennon's solo career.

== Film and re-releases ==
In 1972, Lennon and Ono released an 81-minute film to accompany the Imagine album which featured footage of the couple in their home, garden and the recording studio of their Berkshire property at Tittenhurst Park as well as in New York City. A full-length documentary rock video, the film's first scene features a shot of Lennon and Ono walking through a thick fog, arriving at their house as the song "Imagine" begins. Above the front door to their house is a sign that reads: "This Is Not Here", the title of Ono's then New York art show. The next scene shows Lennon sitting at a white grand piano in a dimly lit, all-white room. Ono gradually walks around opening shutters that allow in light, making the room brighter with the song's progression. At the song's conclusion, Ono sits beside Lennon at the piano; they gaze at one another, and then kiss briefly.

Several celebrities appeared in the film, including Andy Warhol, Fred Astaire, Jack Palance, Dick Cavett and George Harrison. Derided by critics as "the most expensive home movie of all time", it premiered to an American audience in 1972. In 1986, Zbigniew Rybczyński made a music video for the song, and in 1987, it won both the "Silver Lion" award for Best Clip at Cannes and the Festival Award at the Rio International Film Festival.

Released as a single in the United Kingdom in 1975 in conjunction with the album Shaved Fish, "Imagine" peaked at number six on the UK Singles Chart. The photograph on the sleeve was taken by May Pang in 1974. Following Lennon's murder in 1980, the single re-entered the UK chart, reaching number one, where it remained for four weeks in January 1981. "Imagine" was re-released as a single in the UK in 1988, peaking at number 45, and again in 1999, reaching number three. As of June 2013, it had sold over 1.64 million copies in the UK, making it Lennon's best-selling single there. In 1999, on National Poetry Day in the United Kingdom, the BBC announced that listeners had voted "Imagine" Britain's favourite song lyric. In 2003, it reached number 33 as the B-side to a re-release of "Happy Xmas (War Is Over)".

== Reception and criticism ==
Rolling Stone described "Imagine" as Lennon's "greatest musical gift to the world", praising "the serene melody; the pillowy chord progression; [and] that beckoning, four-note [piano] figure". Robert Christgau called it "both a hymn for the Movement and a love song for his wife, celebrating a Yokoism and a Marcusianism simultaneously". Record World said it was "perhaps [Lennon's] most beautiful composition to date."

Included in several song polls, in 1999, BMI named it one of the top 100 most-performed songs of the 20th century. Also that year, it received the Grammy Hall of Fame Award and an induction into the Rock and Roll Hall of Fame's 500 Songs that Shaped Rock and Roll. "Imagine" ranked number 23 in the list of best-selling singles of all time in the UK, in 2000. In 2002, a UK survey conducted by the Guinness World Records British Hit Singles Book ranked it the second best single of all time behind Queen's "Bohemian Rhapsody". Gold Radio ranked the song number three on its "Gold's greatest 1000 hits" list.

Rolling Stone ranked "Imagine" number three on its list of "The 500 Greatest Songs of All Time", describing it as "an enduring hymn of solace and promise that has carried us through extreme grief, from the shock of Lennon's own death in 1980 to the unspeakable horror of September 11. It is now impossible to imagine a world without 'Imagine', and we need it more than he ever dreamed." Despite that sentiment, Clear Channel Communications (now known today as iHeartMedia) included the song on its post-9/11 "do not play" list. (Note: In 1991, the BBC restricted "Imagine" from airplay during the Gulf War.)

On 1 January 2005, the Canadian Broadcasting Corporation named "Imagine" the greatest song in the past 100 years as voted by listeners on the show 50 Tracks. The song ranked number 30 on the Recording Industry Association of America's list of the 365 Songs of the Century bearing the most historical significance. Virgin Radio conducted a UK favourite song survey in December 2005, and listeners voted "Imagine" number one. Australians selected it the greatest song of all time on the Nine Network's 20 to 1 countdown show on 12 September 2006. They voted it eleventh in the youth radio network Triple J's Hottest 100 Of All Time on 11 July 2009.

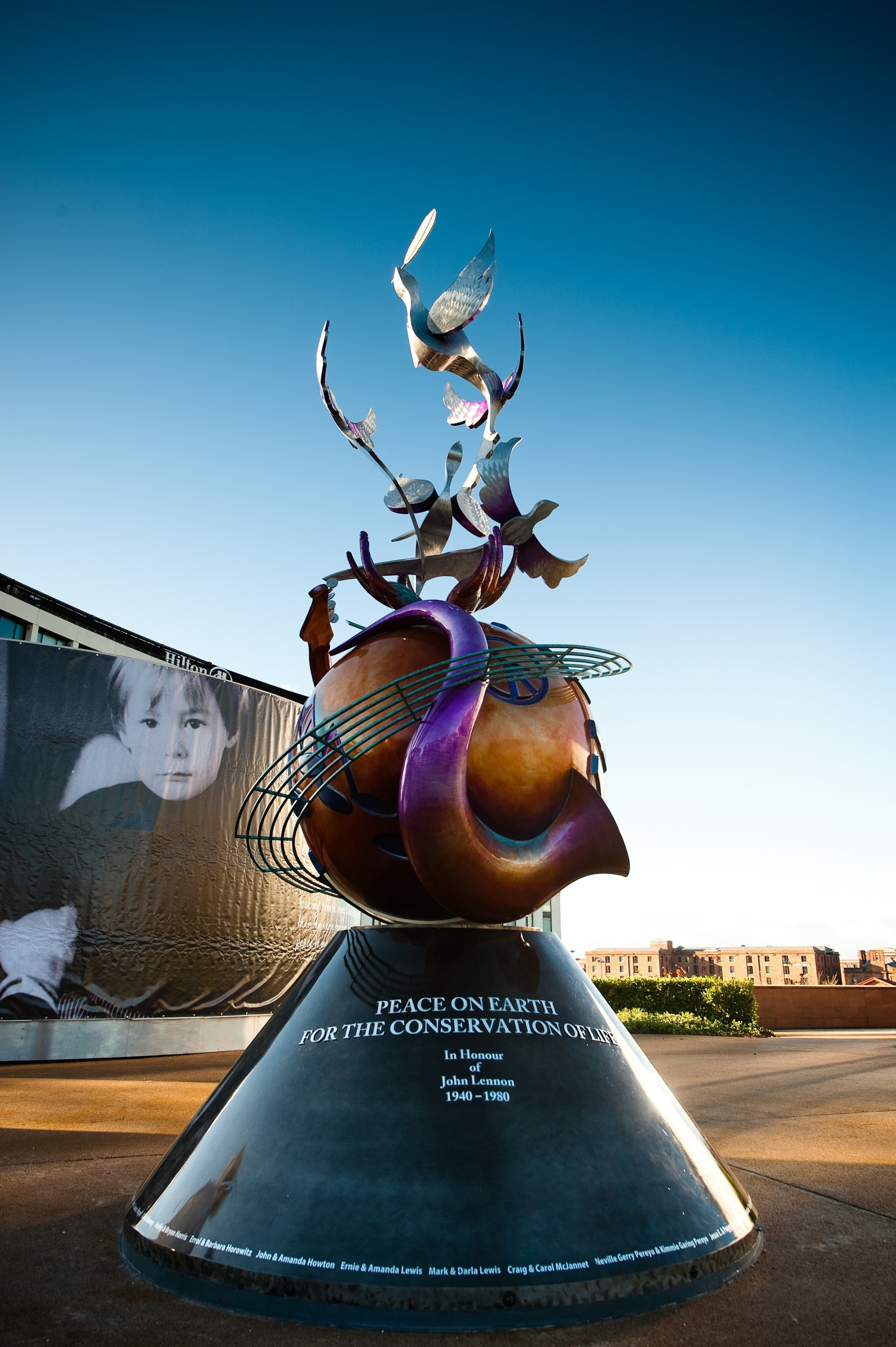
Peace & Harmony, John Lennon Peace Monument in Liverpool

Former US President Jimmy Carter gave the anecdote that "in many countries around the world—my wife and I have visited about 125 countries—you hear John Lennon's song 'Imagine' used almost equally with national anthems." (Note: Yoko Ono dedicated the Imagine Peace Tower in Iceland in 2007.) On 9 October 2010, which would have been Lennon's 70th birthday, the Liverpool Singing Choir performed "Imagine" along with other Lennon songs at the unveiling of the John Lennon Peace Monument in Chavasse Park, Liverpool. Beatles producer George Martin praised Lennon's solo work, singling out the composition: "My favourite song of all was 'Imagine'". Music critic Paul Du Noyer described "Imagine" as Lennon's "most revered" post-Beatles song. Authors Ben Urish and Ken Bielen called it "the most subversive pop song recorded to achieve classic status". Fricke commented: "'Imagine' is a subtly contentious song, Lennon's greatest combined achievement as a balladeer and agitator."

Urish and Bielen criticised the song's instrumental music as overly sentimental and melodramatic, comparing it to the music of the pre-rock era and describing the vocal melody as understated. According to Blaney, Lennon's lyrics describe hypothetical possibilities that offer no practical solutions; lyrics that are at times nebulous and contradictory, asking the listener to abandon political systems while encouraging one similar to communism. Author Chris Ingham indicated the hypocrisy in Lennon, the millionaire rock star living in a mansion, encouraging listeners to imagine living their lives without possessions, a sentiment that Elvis Costello echoed in his 1991 single "The Other Side of Summer". (Note: Elton John, who became a friend of Lennon in the 1970s, privately parodied the song, singing: "Imagine six apartments / It isn't hard to do / One is full of fur coats / Another's full of shoes".) Others argue that Lennon intended the song's lyrics to inspire listeners to imagine if the world could live without possessions, not as an explicit call to give them up. Blaney commented: "Lennon knew he had nothing concrete to offer, so instead he offers a dream, a concept to be built upon."

Blaney considered the song to be "riddled with contradictions. Its hymn-like setting sits uncomfortably alongside its author's plea for us to envision a world without religion." Urish and Bielen described Lennon's "dream world" without a heaven or hell as a call to "make the best world we can here and now, since this is all this is or will be". In their opinion, "because we are asked merely to imagine—to play a 'what if' game, Lennon can escape the harshest criticisms". Former Beatle Ringo Starr defended the song's lyrics during a 1981 interview with Barbara Walters, stating: "[Lennon] said 'imagine', that's all. Just imagine it."

Stereogum contributors Timothy and Elizabeth Bracy did not include "Imagine" as one of Lennon's top 10 solo songs, saying "Lennon's astounding facility for writing instantly memorable hooks meets head on with his occasional weakness for pandering polemics on 'Imagine,' resulting in a tune that everyone can sing along with, even as many can't believe the trite silliness of the lyrics in question. This is yet more proof of Lennon's capacity as a master craftsman, but it doesn't necessarily make it a great song or one that has aged well outside of its vintage."

The morning after the November 2015 Paris attacks, German pianist Davide Martello brought a grand piano to the street out in front of the Bataclan, where 89 concertgoers had been shot dead the night before, and performed an instrumental version to honour the victims of the attacks; video of his performance went viral. This led Katy Waldman of Slate to ponder why "Imagine" had become so frequently performed as a response to tragedy. In addition to its general popularity, she noted its musical simplicity, its key of C major, "the plainest and least complicated key, with no sharps or flats" aside from one passage with "a plaintive major seventh chord that allows a tiny bit of E minor into the tonic". That piano part, "gentle as a rocking chair", underpins lyrics that, Waldman says, "[belong] to the tradition of hymns or spirituals that visualise a glorious afterlife without prophesising any immediate end to suffering on earth". This understanding is also compounded by the historical context of Lennon's own violent death, "remind[ing] us that the universe can run ramshod over idealistic people". Ultimately, the song "captures the fragility of our hope after a violent or destructive event ... [bu]t also reveals its tenacity".

In June 2017, the US National Music Publishers Association awarded "Imagine" a Centennial Song Award and recognised Lennon's desire to add Yoko Ono as a co-author of the song.

"Imagine" was selected by the Library of Congress for preservation in the National Recording Registry in 2023.

Three New York City radio stations have played the song prior to switching longtime formats as a form of farewell: WABC upon moving to a talk format from popular music in 1982, WPLJ when transitioning from popular music to K-Love in 2019, and WCBS-AM before signing off its all-news format and becoming sports radio WHSQ in 2024.

== Performances and cover versions ==
Elton John performed the song regularly on his world tour in 1980, including at his free concert in Central Park, a few blocks away from Lennon's apartment in The Dakota. On 9 December 1980, the day after Lennon's murder, Queen performed "Imagine" as a tribute to him during their Wembley Arena show in London. In 1983, David Bowie performed it in Hong Kong during his Serious Moonlight Tour, on the third anniversary of Lennon's death. On 9 October 1990, more than one billion people listened to a broadcast of the song on what would have been Lennon's 50th birthday. Ratau Mike Makhalemele covered the song on an EP of Lennon covers in 1990. In 1991–92, Liza Minnelli performed the song in her show at Radio City Music Hall. Stevie Wonder gave his rendition of the song, with the Morehouse College Glee Club, during the closing ceremony of the 1996 Summer Olympics as a tribute to the victims of the Centennial Olympic Park bombing. In 2001, Neil Young performed it during the benefit concert America: A Tribute to Heroes. Madonna performed "Imagine" during the benefit Tsunami Aid: A Concert of Hope. (Note: Madonna included the song in her set list of her 2004 Re-Invention World Tour and released it on the live album and DVD documentary I'm Going to Tell You a Secret in 2006.) Peter Gabriel performed the song during the 2006 Winter Olympics opening ceremony. Herman Cain, then the CEO of Godfather's Pizza, performed a parody of "Imagine", identified as "Imagine There's No Pizza", before the Omaha Press Club in 1991, which became a viral video when he ran for President of the United States 20 years later.

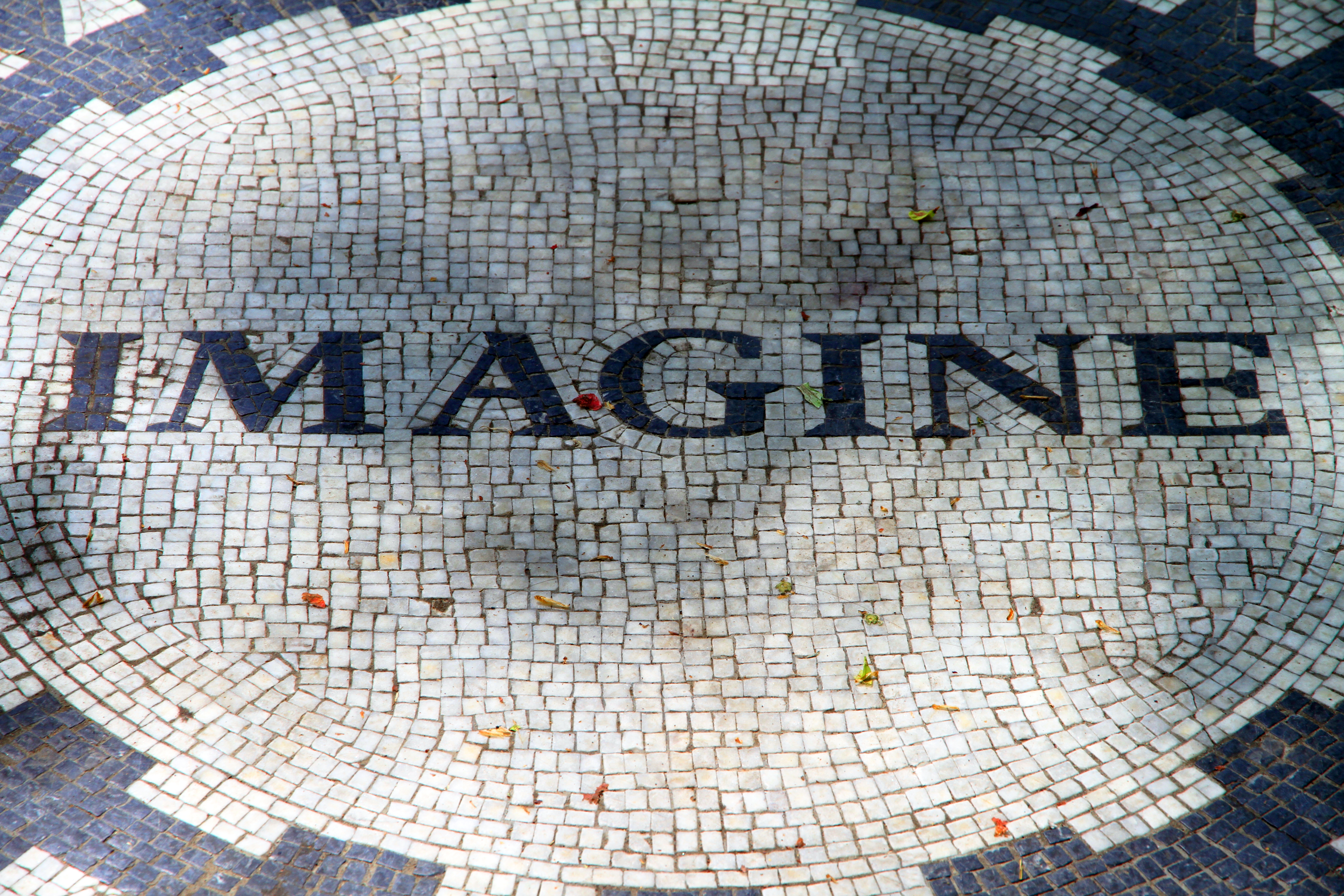
Strawberry Fields Memorial in Central Park to honour John Lennon with the word "Imagine" on it

Since 2005, "Imagine" has been played at 11:55 p.m before the New Year's Eve ball drop at New York City's Times Square. Beginning in 2010, the song has been performed live by the headlining artist; first by Taio Cruz, then in 2011 by CeeLo Green, in 2012 by Train, in 2013 by Melissa Etheridge, in 2014 by O.A.R., in 2015 by Jessie J, in 2016 by Rachel Platten, in 2017 by Andy Grammer, in 2018 by Bebe Rexha, in 2019 by X Ambassadors, in 2020 by Andra Day, in 2021 by KT Tunstall, in 2022 by Chelsea Cutler, in 2023 by Paul Anka, in 2024 by Mickey Guyton, and in 2025 by Tones And I. However, Green received criticism for changing the lyric "and no religion too" to "and all religions true", resulting in an immediate backlash from fans who believed that he had disrespected Lennon's legacy by changing the lyrics of his most iconic song. Green defended the change by saying it meant to represent "a world [where you] could believe what [you] wanted". The event got media attention outside of the US, with Britain's The Guardian stating "Lennon's original lyrics don't praise pluralism or interchangeable religious truths—they damn them".

Numerous artists have recorded cover versions of "Imagine". Joan Baez included it on 1972's Come from the Shadows and Diana Ross recorded a version for her 1973 album, Touch Me in the Morning. In 1995, Blues Traveler recorded the song for the Working Class Hero: A Tribute to John Lennon album and Dave Matthews has performed the song live with them. American singer and guitarist Eva Cassidy recorded a version for her 2002 album of the same name; this version failed to reach the top 100 in the United Kingdom but peaked at number 35 on the UK Indie Chart. A Perfect Circle released a rendition of the song on their 2004 album Emotive. Dolly Parton recorded the song for her 2005 covers album Those Were the Days. David Archuleta reached number 36 in US and number 31 in Canada with his rendition. A cover version of the song, performed by Italian singer Marco Carta, entered the top 20 in Italy in 2009, peaking at number 13.

Seal, Pink, India.Arie, Jeff Beck, Konono Nº1, Oumou Sangaré and others recorded a version for Herbie Hancock's 2010 album The Imagine Project. In February 2011, the recording won a Grammy award for Best Pop Vocal Collaboration.

"Imagine" was performed as part of the closing ceremony of the 2012 Summer Olympics. Performed by the Liverpool Philharmonic Youth Choir and the Liverpool Signing Choir, the choirs sang the first verse and accompanied Lennon's original vocals during the rest of the song. (Note: The first adaptation of the original 8-track recording of "Imagine", Lennon also appeared in video.) A cover performed by Emeli Sandé was also used by the BBC for a closing montage that ended its coverage. "Imagine" subsequently re-entered the UK Top 40, reaching number 18.

In 2014, to celebrate 25 years of UNICEF's Convention on the Rights of the Child, the organisation launched an initiative using the song. Performers including Ono, Hugh Jackman and ABBA announced the initiative at an event at the UN General Assembly in New York, with the intention of spreading the message that every voice matters. To do this, various celebrities and singers recorded cover versions of the song, which can be played on a downloadable app for people around the world to virtually sing with the celebrities and then share the videos on social media with related hashtags.

In 2015, American singer and songwriter Lady Gaga performed the song at the 2015 European Games opening ceremony. The song was played for 70,000 people in Baku, Azerbaijan, that served as host of the event. In 2018, the song was performed at the 2018 Winter Olympics opening ceremony in Pyeongchang (South Korea). The same year Yoko Ono released a solo rendition of the song, the first since she received credit as co-writer.

In 2020, amid the first COVID-19 lockdowns, Gal Gadot and a number of other celebrities performed an online version of the song intended to raise morale in the face of the pandemic. The performance was poorly received by audiences, many of whom criticized it for being a tone-deaf message from a group of socialites and members of the international elite who were largely unaffected by the pandemic. In June 2020, actor Chris O'Dowd, who appeared in the online version of the song, said the criticisms of the project were "justified", referring to the video as "creative diarrhoea".

A pre-recorded version of the song performed by John Legend, Keith Urban, Alejandro Sanz and Angélique Kidjo, with musical arrangement by Hans Zimmer, was featured in the opening ceremony for the 2020 Summer Olympics in Tokyo in July 2021, and another pre-recorded cover version again as a theme song in the opening ceremony of the 2022 Winter Olympics in Beijing in February 2022.

During the 2022 Russian invasion of Ukraine, Lennon's son Julian Lennon for the first time covered his father's song, calling on world leaders and everyone who believes in the song's sentiment of hope and peace to stand up for refugees.

Garth Brooks and Trisha Yearwood covered the song in November 2023 during the funeral for Former First Lady of the United States, Rosalynn Carter. On January 9, 2025, Brooks and Yearwood covered the song again during the State Funeral of Former President Jimmy Carter.

An abridged version of the song was performed by Filipino cardinal Luis Antonio Tagle in 2019 at the Araneta Coliseum garnered controversy when the fake news site LifeSiteNews unearthed a video of Tagle in 2025 as part of a by ultraconservative politicians and Catholics to elect a conservative pope, insinuating that Tagle was condoning the song's anti-religious message. The rendition has since been revealed to be an abridged version where he skipped the opening verses and begun at the chorus, as well as replacing the line "A brotherhood of man" with "A brotherhood for all" in the final verse.

== Personnel ==
- John Lennon – vocals, piano
- Klaus Voormann – bass
- Alan White – drums
- The Flux Fiddlers – strings

== Charts ==
=== Weekly charts ===
==== Original release ====
Chart (1971–1972)	Peak position
Australia (Go-Set National Top 40)	1
Australia (Kent Music Report)	1
Belgium (Ultratop 50 Flanders)	12
Canada Top Singles (RPM)	1
Canada Adult Contemporary (RPM)	4
Italy (Musica e dischi)	3
Japan (Oricon)	14
Netherlands (Dutch Top 40)	6
Netherlands (Single Top 100)	5
New Zealand (Listener)	1
Norway (VG-lista)	6
South Africa (Springbok Radio)	1
Switzerland (Schweizer Hitparade)	5
US Billboard Hot 100	3
US Easy Listening (Billboard)	7
US Top Singles (Cash Box)	2
US Top Singles (Record World)	1
West Germany (GfK)	18

==== 1975 release ====
Chart (1975)	Peak position
Ireland (IRMA)	1
Sweden (Sverigetopplistan)	19
UK Singles (Official Charts)	6

==== Posthumous releases ====
Chart (1981)	Peak position
Australia (Kent Music Report)	43
Austria (Ö3 Austria Top 40)	4
Belgium (Ultratop 50 Flanders)	6
Finland (Suomen virallinen lista)	16
Ireland (IRMA)	1
Luxembourg (Radio Luxembourg)	1
Netherlands (Single Top 100)	5
New Zealand (Recorded Music NZ)	23
Norway (VG-lista)	3
Switzerland (Schweizer Hitparade)	2
UK Singles (Official Charts)	1
West Germany (GfK)	7

Year	Chart (1986–2013)	Peak position
1986	US Top Rock Tracks (Billboard) (Note: Album track from Live in New York City.)	20
1988	Ireland (IRMA)	29
1988	Italy Airplay (Music & Media)	1
1988	UK Singles (Official Charts)	45
1989	Australia (ARIA)	21
1989	Netherlands (Single Top 100)	83
1990	France (SNEP)	88
1994	France (SNEP)	9
1999–2000	Canada (Canadian Singles Chart)	10
1999–2000	Ireland (IRMA)	3
1999–2000	Italy (FIMI)	12
1999–2000	Netherlands (Single Top 100)	56
1999–2000	Spain (Promusicae)	5
1999–2000	UK Singles (Official Charts)	3
2007	Canada (Hot Canadian Digital Singles)	47
2007	Netherlands (Single Top 100)	37
2007	Switzerland (Schweizer Hitparade)	59
2007	UK Singles (Official Charts)	75
2007	US Hot Digital Songs (Billboard)	47
2008	Australia (ARIA)	94
2010	Australia (ARIA)	85
2010	Austria (Ö3 Austria Top 40)	66
2010	Germany (GfK)	94
2010	Spain (Promusicae)	49
2010	Sweden (Sverigetopplistan)	46
2010	Switzerland (Schweizer Hitparade)	50
2012	Spain (Promusicae)	42
2012	UK Singles (Official Charts)	18
2013	Spain (Promusicae)	44
2015	France (SNEP)	11
2015	Netherlands (Single Top 100)	67
2015	Spain (Promusicae)	40
2015	Switzerland (Schweizer Hitparade)	61
2016	France (SNEP)	169

=== Year-end charts ===
Chart (1971)	Rank
Canada Top Singles (RPM)	15
Netherlands (Dutch Top 40)	67
Netherlands (Single Top 100)	82

Chart (1972)	Rank
Australia (Kent Music Report)	19
Japan (Oricon)	98
South Africa (Springbok Radio)	5

Chart (1981)	Rank
Belgium (Ultratop 50 Flanders)	86
Netherlands (Dutch Top 40)	70
Netherlands (Single Top 100)	73

Chart (1999)	Rank
UK Singles (OCC)	65

=== Decade-end charts ===
Chart (1980–1989)	Rank
UK Singles (OCC)	25

=== All-time charts ===
Chart (1952–2013)	Rank
UK Singles (OCC)	19

== Certifications and sales ==
Region	Certification	Certified units/sales
Brazil (Pro-Música Brasil)	Platinum	60,000^{‡}
Denmark (IFPI Danmark)	Platinum	90,000^{‡}
Germany (BVMI)	Gold	250,000^{‡}
Italy (FIMI) sales since 2009	Platinum	50,000^{‡}
Japan	—	118,000
New Zealand (RMNZ)	2× Platinum	60,000^{‡}
South Africa	—	25,000
Spain (Promusicae)	Platinum	60,000^{‡}
United Kingdom (BPI) 1975 release	Platinum	1,000,000^{^}
United Kingdom (BPI) 2007 release	2× Platinum	1,200,000^{‡}
United States (RIAA)	3× Platinum	3,000,000^{‡}
^{^} Shipments figures based on certification alone.^{‡} Sales+streaming figures based on certification alone.

== See also ==
- Imagine, 1972 film featuring Lennon and Ono
- Imagine Piano Peace Project
- List of anti-war songs
- List of best-selling singles in the United Kingdom
- List of best-selling singles of the 1980s in the United Kingdom
- List of Billboard Hot 100 top 10 singles in 1971
- List of number-one singles in Australia during the 1970s
- List of number-one singles of 1971 (Canada)
- List of number-one singles of 1975 (Ireland)
- List of number-one singles of 1981 (Ireland)
- List of number-one hits (Italy)
- List of UK Singles Chart number ones of the 1980s

== Bibliography ==
- Blaney, John (2007). Lennon and McCartney: Together Alone (1st ed.). Jawbone Press. ISBN 978-1-906002-02-2.
- Du Noyer, Paul (1971). Imagine (Media notes). John Lennon. Capitol Records.
- Ingham, Chris (2009). The Rough Guide to the Beatles (3rd ed.). Rough Guides. ISBN 978-1-84836-525-4.
- Fricke, David (2012) [2002]. "The Making of 'Imagine'". In Wenner, Jann (ed.). John Lennon: The Ultimate Guide to His Life, Music, and Legend. Rolling Stone. ISBN 978-7-09-893419-6.
- Harry, Bill (2000). The John Lennon Encyclopedia. Virgin. ISBN 978-0-7535-0404-8.
- Levy, Joe, ed. (2005). Rolling Stone's 500 Greatest Albums of All Time (First Paperback ed.). Wenner Books. ISBN 978-1-932958-61-4.
- Lennon, John (1983). The John Lennon Collection. Hal Leonard Corporation. ISBN 978-0-7935-0265-3.
- Madinger, Chip; Raile, Scott (2015). Lennonology Strange Days Indeed – A Scrapbook of Madness. Chesterfield, MO: Open Your Books, LLC. ISBN 978-1-63110-175-5.
- Pang, May (2008). Instamatic Karma. St. Martin's Press (Hardcover). ISBN 978-0-312-37741-0.
- Roberts, David, ed. (2005). British Hit Singles & Albums (18 ed.). Guinness World Records Limited. ISBN 978-1-904994-00-8.
- Rodriguez, Robert (2010). Fab Four FAQ 2.0: The Beatles' Solo Years, 1970–1980. Milwaukee, WI: Backbeat Books. ISBN 978-1-4165-9093-4.
- Sheff, David (1981). Golson, G. Barry (ed.). All We Are Saying: The Last Major Interview with John Lennon and Yoko Ono (2000 ed.). St Martin's Griffin. ISBN 978-0-312-25464-3.
- Urish, Ben; Bielen, Ken (2007). The Words and Music of John Lennon. Praeger. ISBN 978-0-275-99180-7.
- Wenner, Jann (2010) [2004]. 500 Greatest Songs of All Time. OCLC 641731526.

== Documentaries ==
- Yoko Ono, Phil Spector (Producers) (2000). Gimme Some Truth – The Making of John Lennon's "Imagine" (DVD). Capitol. ASIN B000AYELY2.
- Andrew Solt (Director) (2005). Imagine: John Lennon (DVD). Warner Home Video. ASIN 6305847118.
