= Liverpool Summer Pops =

Former annual music festival held in Liverpool, England

Coordinates: 53°23′51″N 2°59′29.7″W

The Liverpool Summer Pops is a summer music event in Liverpool. Now being branded as "Liverpool Summer Pops Festival", the event features performances by bands and artists in one venue over consecutive nights, as well as some events in other 'fringe' venues.

== History ==
The Summer Pops was established in 1993 by the Royal Liverpool Philharmonic Society under the Artistic Direction of conductor Carl Davis. The event was created to give the RLPO somewhere to play in the summers of 1993–1995 while the Philharmonic Hall was being refurbished.

The event proved popular and was continued, with artists other than the RLPO performing, but by 2001 the costs of running the event had become too much for the RLPS, so Liverpool City Council asked promoter CMP Entertainment to run the event.

== Venue ==
The original venue for the Summer Pops was a green and yellow Big Top tent situated on King's Dock in Liverpool. In 2005, the tent was moved to nearby Trafalgar Dock to make way for the construction of an Arena, ACC Liverpool on the King's Dock site. In 2007, the event moved to the pavilion at Aintree racecourse, and in 2008 the Pops moved to the Arena built on its former home on Kings Dock.

== Performers ==
A variety of acts are booked to perform each year, including Gloria Estefan, the RLPO, Elton John, Paul McCartney, The Corrs, The Who, James Brown, Paul Simon, Bob Dylan, Diana Ross, Jools Holland, Tom Jones, Bryan Ferry, Westlife, Alice Cooper, Julio Iglesias, Sugababes, ZZ Top, Eric Clapton, Pet Shop Boys, Corinne Bailey Rae, Bryan Adams, Il Divo and Blink-182
