= Exhibition Centre Liverpool =

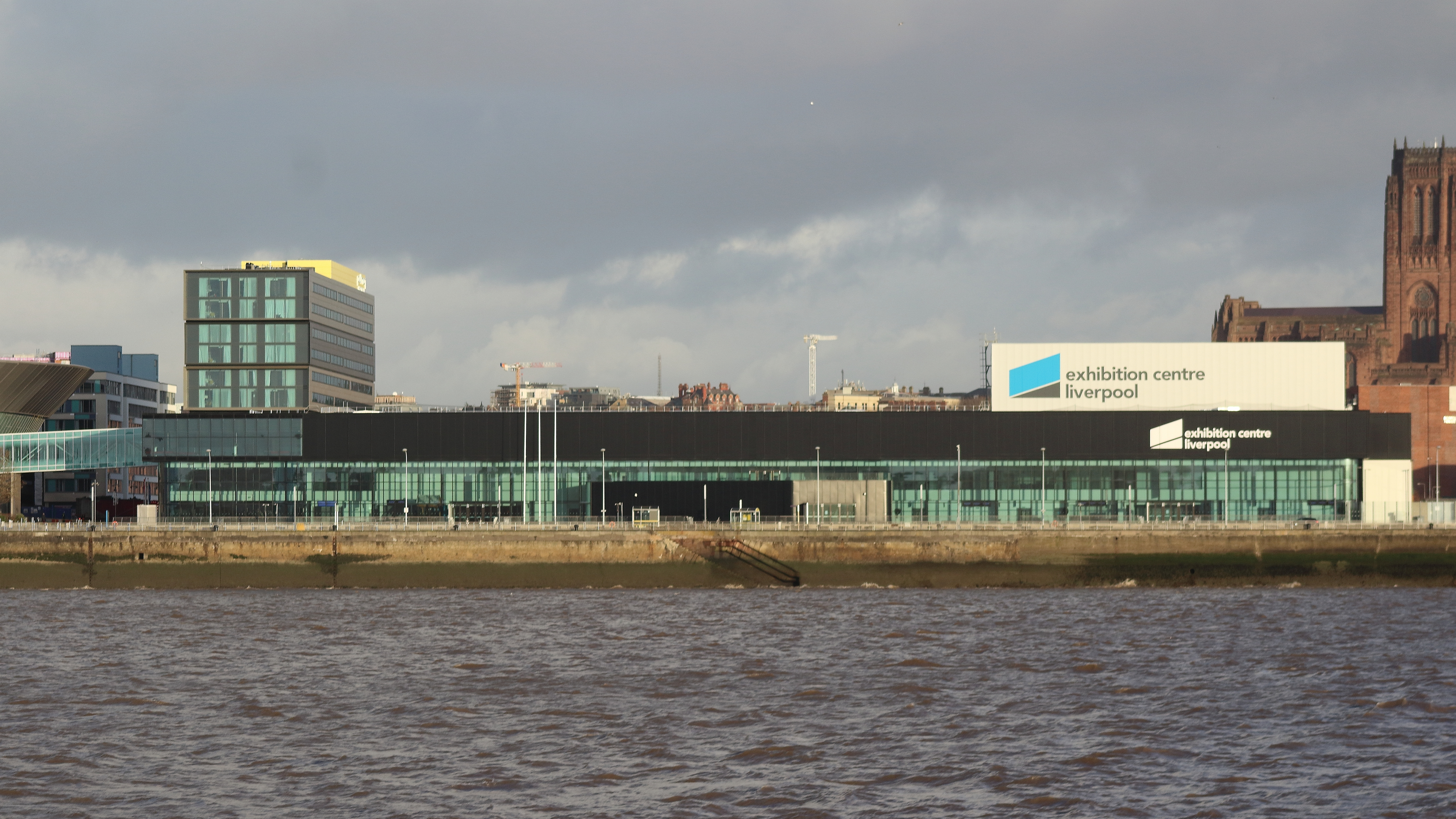
- Interactive map of Exhibition Centre Liverpool
- Location: Kings Dock, Liverpool, England
- Coordinates: 53.39527°N 2.99016°W

Construction
- Groundbreaking: January 2014
- Opened: September 2015
- Architects: Populous (design); Denton Corker Marshall (executive)
- Structural engineer: Booth King

Exhibition Centre Liverpool is a multi-million pound exhibition centre, the latest addition to Liverpool event campus, alongside interconnected sister venues ACC Liverpool and M&S Bank Arena.

== History ==
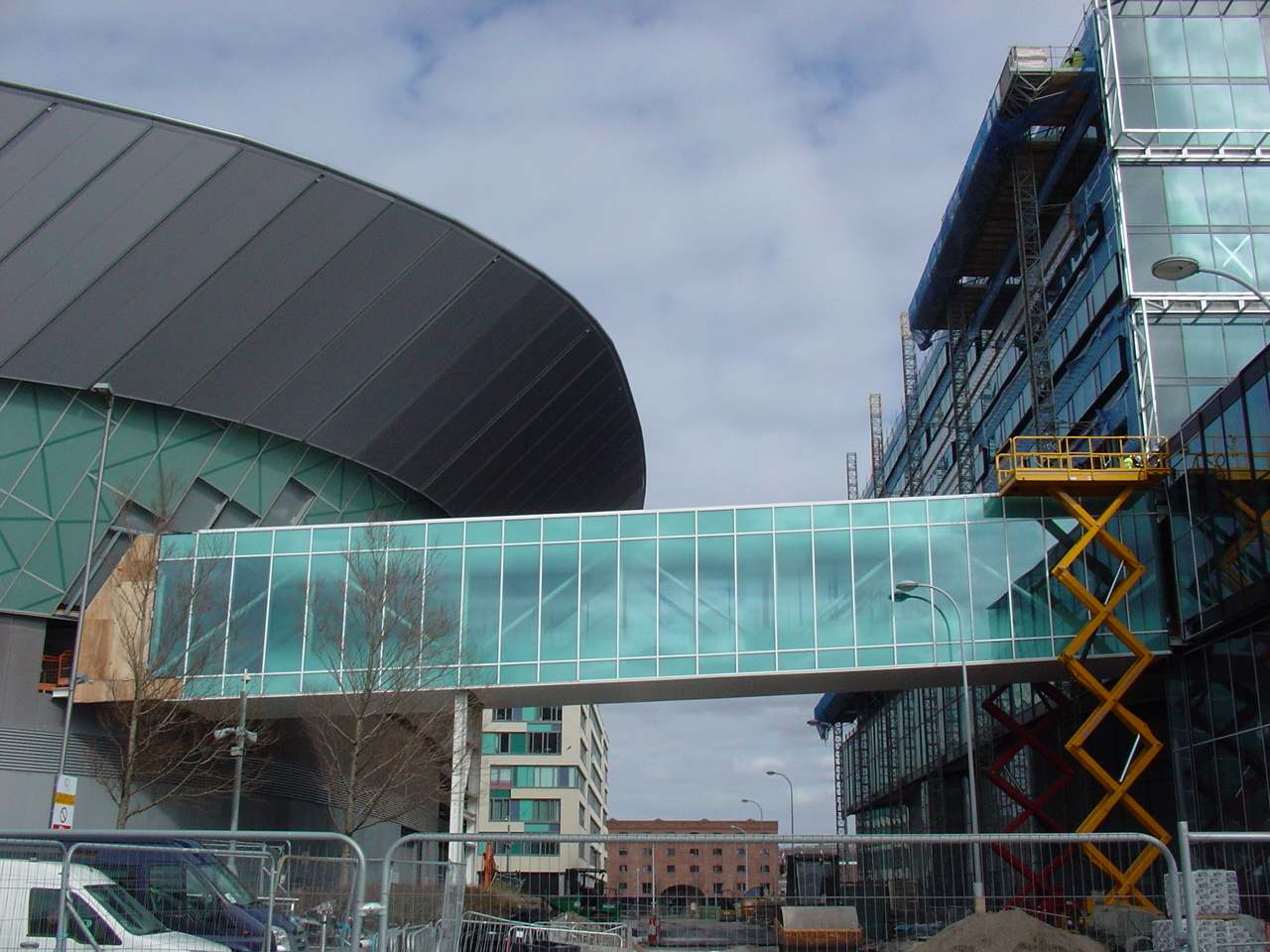
The 'sky bridge' connecting the two venues (March 2015)

The 8,100m^{2} exhibition centre was constructed from January 2014 and opened in September 2015. A sky bridge connecting the building to the adjacent convention centre was completed in September 2015, in turn creating the only purpose built interconnected arena, convention centre and exhibition facility in the UK. During its first year of opening, the Exhibition Centre welcomed more than 113,000 visitors over 100 different exhibitions.

The venue can also be utilised for standing concerts for up to 7,000, with the introduction of Space by M&S Bank Arena Liverpool, Exhibition Centre Liverpool's sister venue.

== Events ==
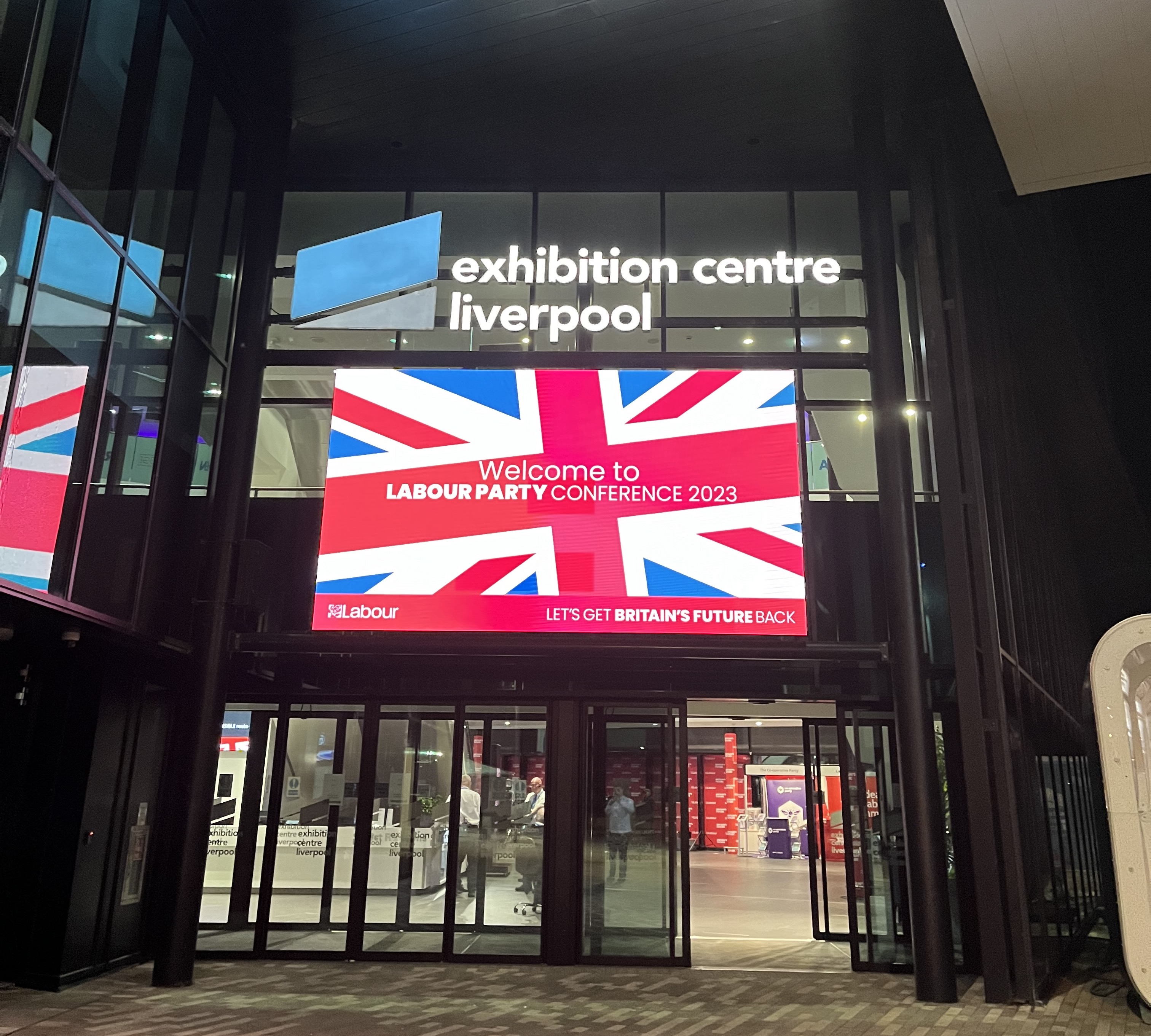
Labour Party conference in 2023

Since 2011, Exhibition Centre Liverpool has regularly hosted the Labour Party's annual conference. Alternating between venues and locations, Exhibition Centre Liverpool along with its interconnecting sister venues, ACC Liverpool and Liverpool Arena, has hosted Labour Party conference five times to 2023. In 2023, the conference was attended by 18,000 party members, businesses, and visitors drawing in an estimated £29m for the local economy.

== See also ==
- ACC Liverpool
