= Imagine Piano Peace Project =

Exhibition of John Lennon's piano

The "Imagine Piano" at the Crittenden County Courthouse in Marion, Arkansas, 2007. It was there in relation to the West Memphis Three.

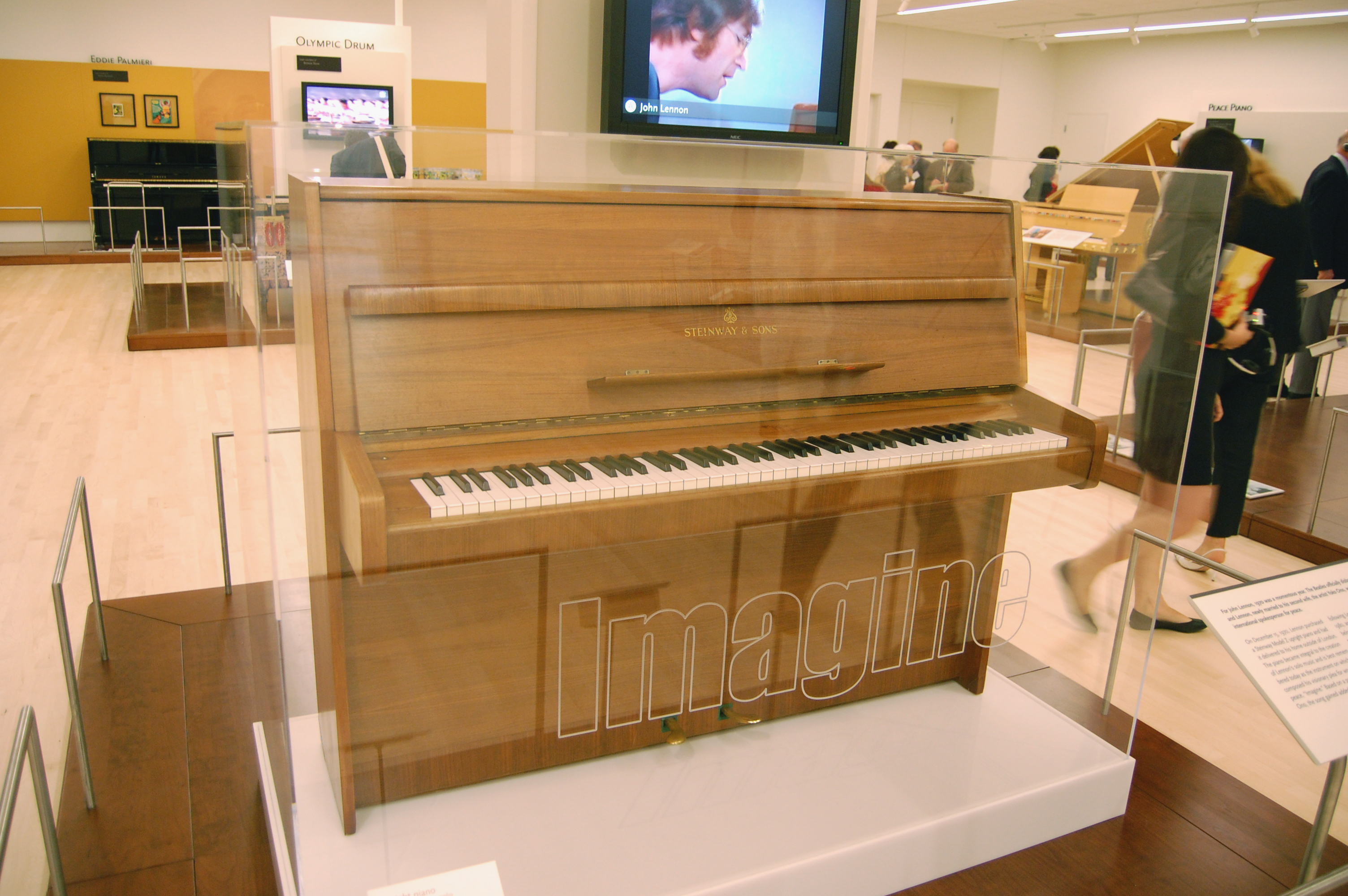
The "Imagine Piano" on display at the Musical Instrument Museum, Phoenix, Arizona

The Imagine Piano Peace Project was a peaceful demonstration against violence in which a piano associated with nonviolence was exhibited at various U.S. sites of infamous violence. The piano, a Steinway upright, was purchased new by John Lennon in December 1970 and delivered to the recording studio in his home in Berkshire, England. There, in 1971, he composed and recorded the song "Imagine" on the piano, and was filmed using it to play the song to his wife Yoko Ono.

A private collector bought the "Imagine piano" in 1992 and allowed the Beatles' Story museum in Liverpool, England, to exhibit it from February to October 2000, when it was sold by the auction house Fleetwood Owen, a business partnership of musician Mick Fleetwood and auctioneer Ted Owen that sold other Beatles memorabilia in the same auction.

In the 2000 auction, English singer-songwriter George Michael and his American domestic partner Kenny Goss bought the piano for £1.45 million. They allowed the piano to be exhibited at a peace protest on November 22, 2006, at "The Grassy Knoll" in Dallas, Texas, U.S., where President John F. Kennedy was assassinated on November 22, 1963, and from April through May 2007 the piano was on a "tour" of U.S. places where significant acts of violence had taken place: At each site, someone played (and sometimes sang) the song Imagine, and the owners' employees videotaped and photographed the event for future publications to benefit charity. Throughout the tour, the piano stopped at locations such as the Federal Building in Oklahoma City, Waco, Texas, the Lorraine Motel, and Ford's Theater.

In late May 2007, Michael and Goss donated the "Imagine piano" to the victims of the shootings on the campus of Virginia Tech on April 16, 2007, and the piano was delivered to that school.

The piano was on display at the Musical Instrument Museum in Phoenix, Arizona in 2010.

The tour ended in 2019, with the last stop being the Goss-Michael Foundation in Dallas, Texas. In October 2020, the piano was put on display at the Strawberry Field exhibition in Liverpool to celebrate what would have been Lennon’s 80th birthday on 9 October.

== See also ==
- Imagine Peace Tower
