= Imagine Peace Tower =

Memorial to John Lennon near Reykjavík

Coordinates: 64°9′47.66″N 21°51′34.08″W

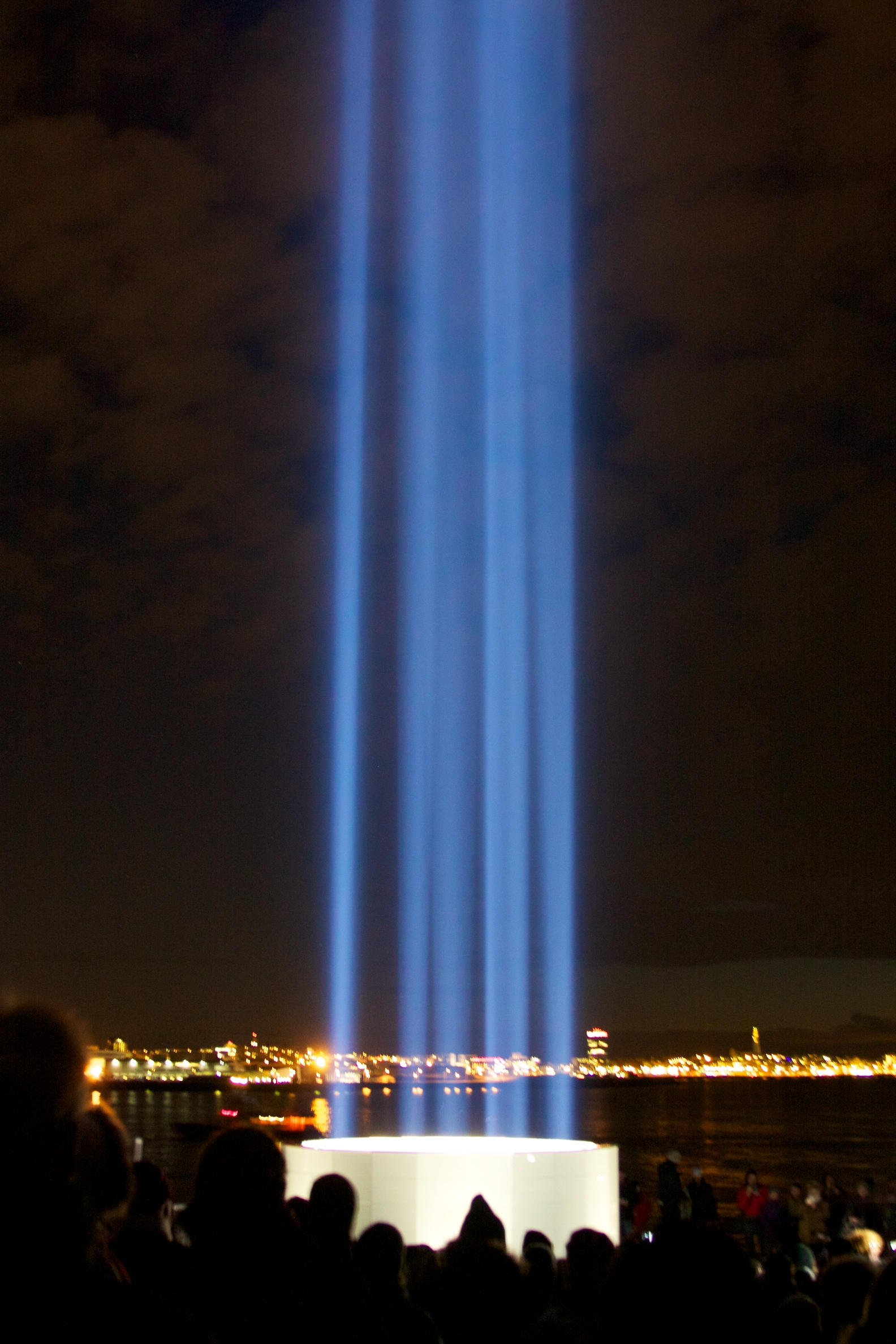
- Imagine Peace Tower with lights on
- Interactive map of Imagine Peace Tower
- Location: Viðey Island in Kollafjörður Bay near Reykjavík, Iceland
- Opening date: 2007
- Dedicated to: John Lennon

The Imagine Peace Tower (Icelandic: Friðarsúlan [ˈfrɪːðarˌsuːlan], lit. 'the peace column') is a memorial to John Lennon from his widow, Yoko Ono, located on Viðey Island in Kollafjörður Bay near Reykjavík, Iceland. Installed in 2007, it consists of a tall tower of light, projected from a white stone monument that has the words "Imagine Peace" carved into it in 24 languages. These words, and the name of the tower, are a reference to Lennon's campaign for peace, and his 1971 song "Imagine".

== Description ==
The Tower consists of 15 searchlights with prisms that act as mirrors, reflecting the column of light vertically into the sky from a 10-metre wide wishing well. It often reaches cloudbase and indeed can be seen penetrating the cloud cover. On a clear night, it appears to reach an altitude of at least 4,000 metres. The power for the lights is provided by Iceland's unique geothermal energy grid. It uses approximately 75 kW of power.

Buried underneath the light tower are over 1 million written wishes that Ono gathered over the years for another project called Wish Trees. Iceland was selected for the project because of its beauty and its eco-friendly use of geothermal energy.

== Construction ==
Construction of the tower started on 9 October 2006, on what would have been Lennon's 66th birthday when Ono dedicated the location, and it was officially unveiled on the same date in 2007. The ceremony was broadcast internationally to numerous television networks. In attendance with Ono were son Sean Lennon, bandmate Ringo Starr, Olivia Harrison, widow of George Harrison, and Olivia's son Dhani Harrison. Paul McCartney was invited, but could not attend due to a court case. Ono said on the day of the inauguration that the tower was the best thing that she and John had ever done.

== Operation ==
The tower is lit every year from 9 October, Lennon's birthday, to 8 December, the date he was shot, from 31 December until 6 January (an Icelandic new year period), and for one week around the spring equinox.

On 9 October 2021, it was lit for the 15th time on John Lennon's birthday. The monument was lit on 24 February 2022, with Ono saying the lighting was "to show solidarity with Ukraine and emphasize the call for peace."

== Languages on the tower ==
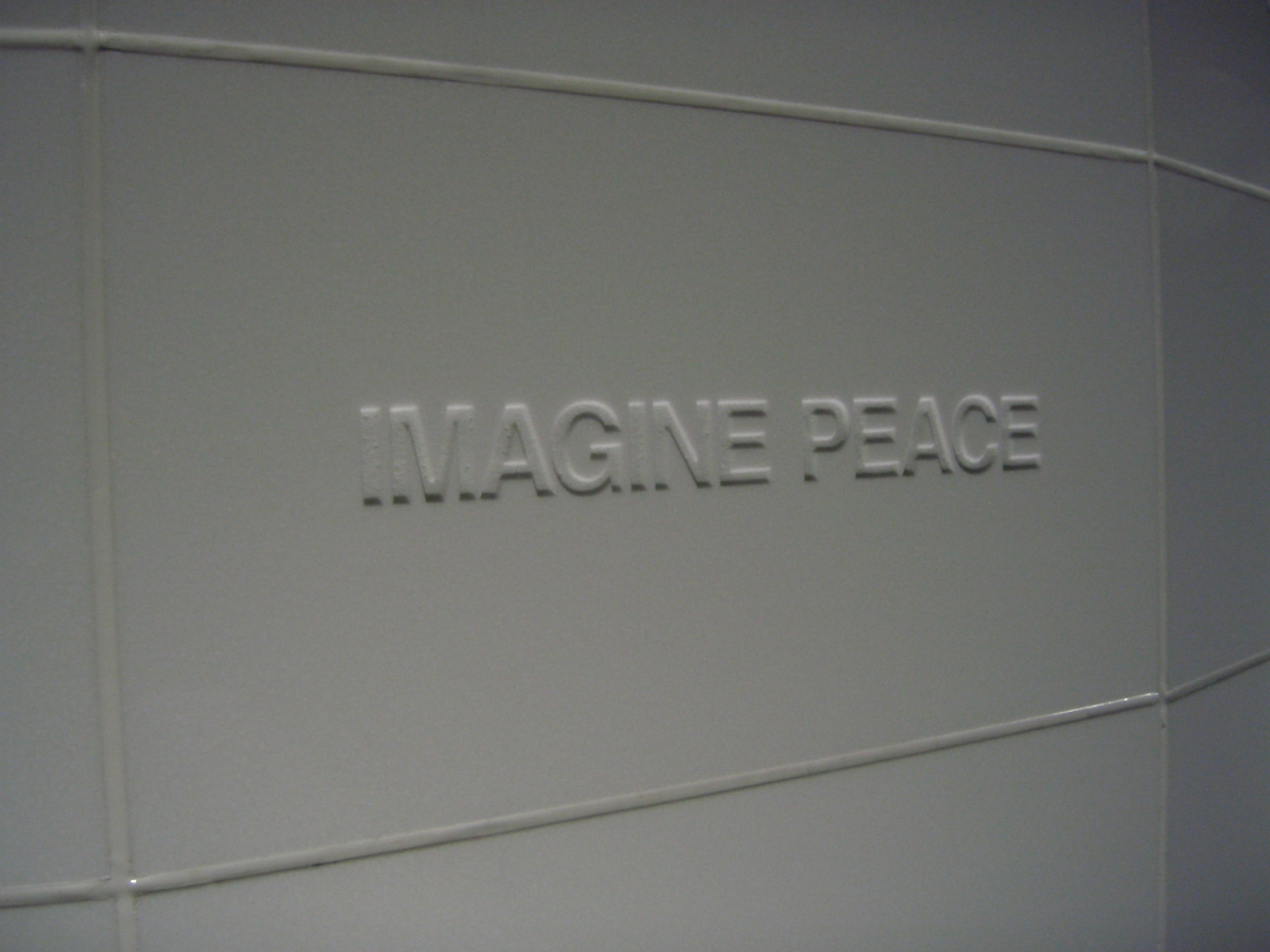
Imagine Peace message.

The words on the tower are written in 24 world languages:

English: IMAGINE PEACE	Swahili: TUFIKIRIENI AMANI
Japanese: 平和な世界を想像してごらん	Icelandic: HUGSA SÉR FRIÐ
Korean: 평화를 꿈꾸자	Turkish: BARIŞI DÜŞLE
Chinese: 想像世界有了和平	Persian: رویای صلح
Arabic: احلم سلام	Filipino: ILARAWAN ANG MUNDONG MAPAYAPA
Portuguese: IMAGINE A PAZ	Tamil: சமாதானத்தை நினையுங்கள்
Russian: ПРЕДСТАВЬТЕ СЕБЕ МИР	Hungarian: KÉPZELD EL A BÉKÉT
Hindi: शान्ति की कल्पना करें	Finnish: KUVITTELE RAUHA
German: STELL DIR VOR ES IST FRIEDEN	Georgian: წარმოიდგინეთ მშვიდობა
Italian: IMMAGINA LA PACE	Standard Tibetan: ཞི་བ་སྒོམས།
French: IMAGINEZ LA PAIX	Hebrew: חלום שלום
Spanish: IMAGINA LA PAZ	Inuktitut: ᓴᐃᒪᖃᑎᒌᑦᑕ

An additional panel reads:

I dedicate this light tower to John Lennon

my love for you is forever
yoko ono
October 9th 2007

== See also ==
- Imagine Piano Peace Project
- Cathedral of Light – Feature of the Nazi Party rallies in Nuremberg
- Spectra (installation) – Series of art installations by Ryoji Ikeda
- Tribute in Light – Annual tribute to 9/11 victims
