= King's Dock, Port of Liverpool =

Former dock in Liverpool, England

King's Dock

Location
- Location: Liverpool, United Kingdom
- Coordinates: 53.3967°N 2.9900°W
- OS grid: SJ342893

Details
- Opened: 1785
- Closed: 1972
- Type: Wet dock
- Area: 7 acres (2.8 ha), 3,896 sq yd (3,258 m^{2}) (in 1859)
- Width at entrance: 42 ft (13 m) (in 1859)
- Quay length: 875 yd (800 m) (in 1859)

King's Dock was a dock on the River Mersey in England and part of the Port of Liverpool. It was situated in the southern dock system, connected to Wapping Dock to the north and Queen's Dock to the south. It consisted of two branch docks.

== History ==
The dock was designed by Henry Berry and opened in 1785. Further warehouse buildings were added by John Foster Sr. The dock was closed in 1972 and the branch docks have been filled in.

== After closure ==
The open space was often used as a concert venue, when a large tent and stage was erected. The Royal Liverpool Philharmonic Orchestra played their Summer Pops concert series here. Everton FC had proposed to build a new stadium here, but those plans fell through in 2003. On 28 July 2004, Irish vocal pop band Westlife held a concert for their Turnaround Tour supporting their album Turnaround.

In 2008 completed regeneration of King's Waterfront, adjacent to the Albert Dock, became an exemplary case of successful brownfield land development. As a result of this project, leisure, residential and conference facilities have been developed including 11,000-seat capacity Echo Arena Liverpool and convention centre officially opened in January 2008 when Liverpool's year of European Capital of Culture began, 3,600 square metre multi-purpose hall, 1,350 seat conference auditorium with associated breakout rooms, 1,600 space multi-storey car park, central public plaza, 1,800 residential housing units, and two 3-star plus hotels, along with the 4-star luxury Pullman Liverpool Hotel.

The John Lennon Peace Monument is located here, unveiled in 2010.

On New Year's Eve 2017, the car park caught fire, and around 1,400 cars burned and damaged the structure.
