= John Lennon Peace Monument =

Monument in Liverpool, England

Coordinates: 53°23′48″N 2°59′27.45″W

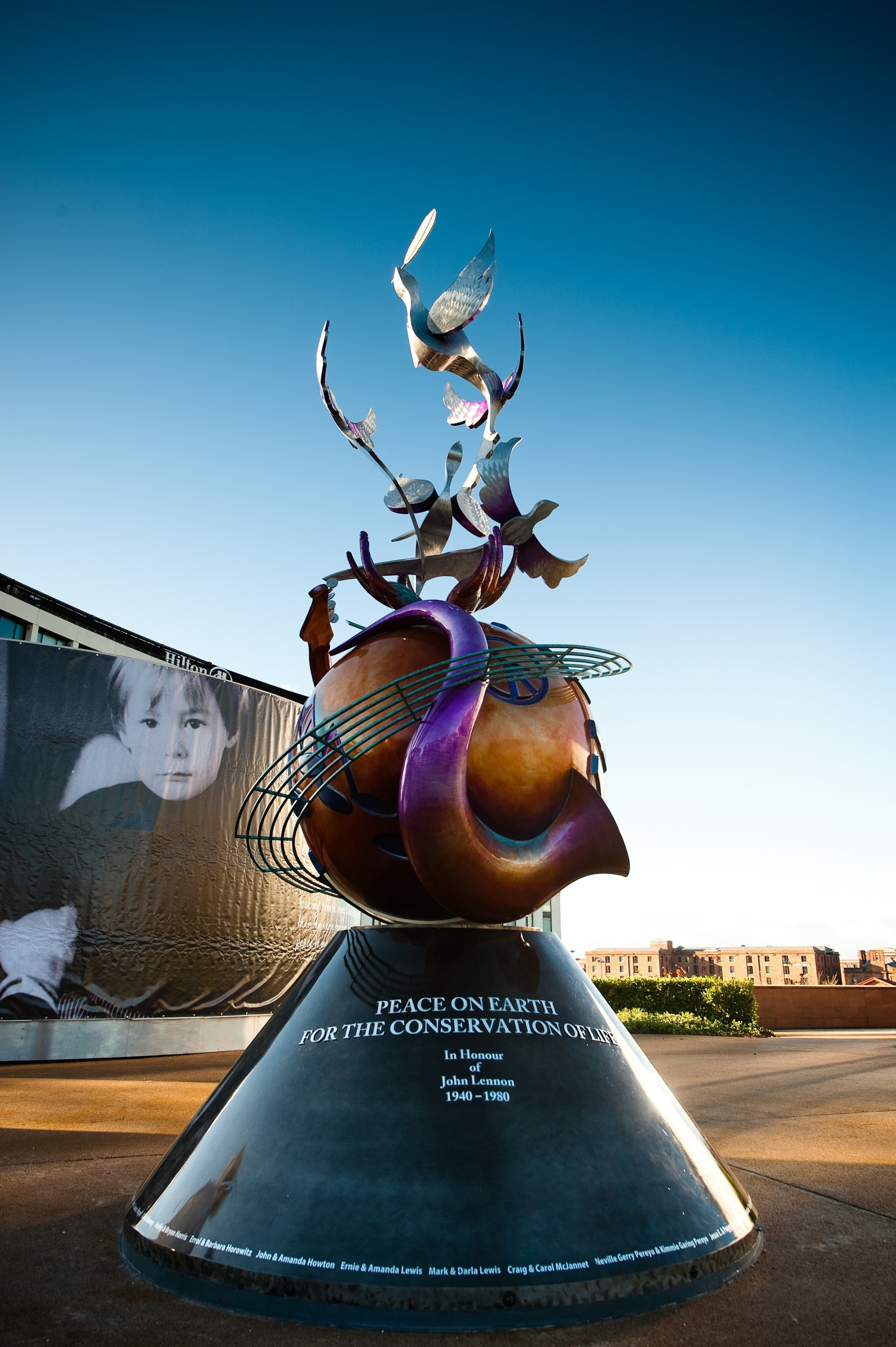
Peace & Harmony by Lauren Voiers

The John Lennon Peace Monument, also known as the European Peace Monument, is a peace monument entitled Peace & Harmony in Liverpool, England, dedicated to the memory of John Lennon. Peace & Harmony was unveiled by Julian and Cynthia Lennon at a ceremony in Chavasse Park, Liverpool, on Saturday 9 October 2010 to celebrate what would have been John Lennon's 70th birthday. The monument is now on the waterfront adjacent to ACC Liverpool at Kings Dock.

== The monument ==
The 18-foot sculpture was created by Lauren Voiers, a 19-year-old American artist, and fabricated by Lyle London and Shannon Owen at Art in Metal USA in Tempe, Arizona. Voiers was commissioned by the Global Peace Initiative to create the monument from her original painting, Peace & Harmony, as part of the Global Peace Initiative to position sculptures of peace on each continent.

The artwork was originally in a five-acre green space in Chavasse Park, but is now in the public space alongside ACC Liverpool, offering a geographical point where people can gather to remember John Lennon and contemplate his quest for world peace. The sculpture is hand-painted metal with a white glass feather placed at the top. Artist Voiers describes the essence of the monument as it relates to John Lennon, "His overall message is of people for people. When I was starting the monument I decided to incorporate music as the overall theme. There are a lot of healing powers to music, and Lennon captured that through his whole career and in dedicating himself to peace and bringing people together."

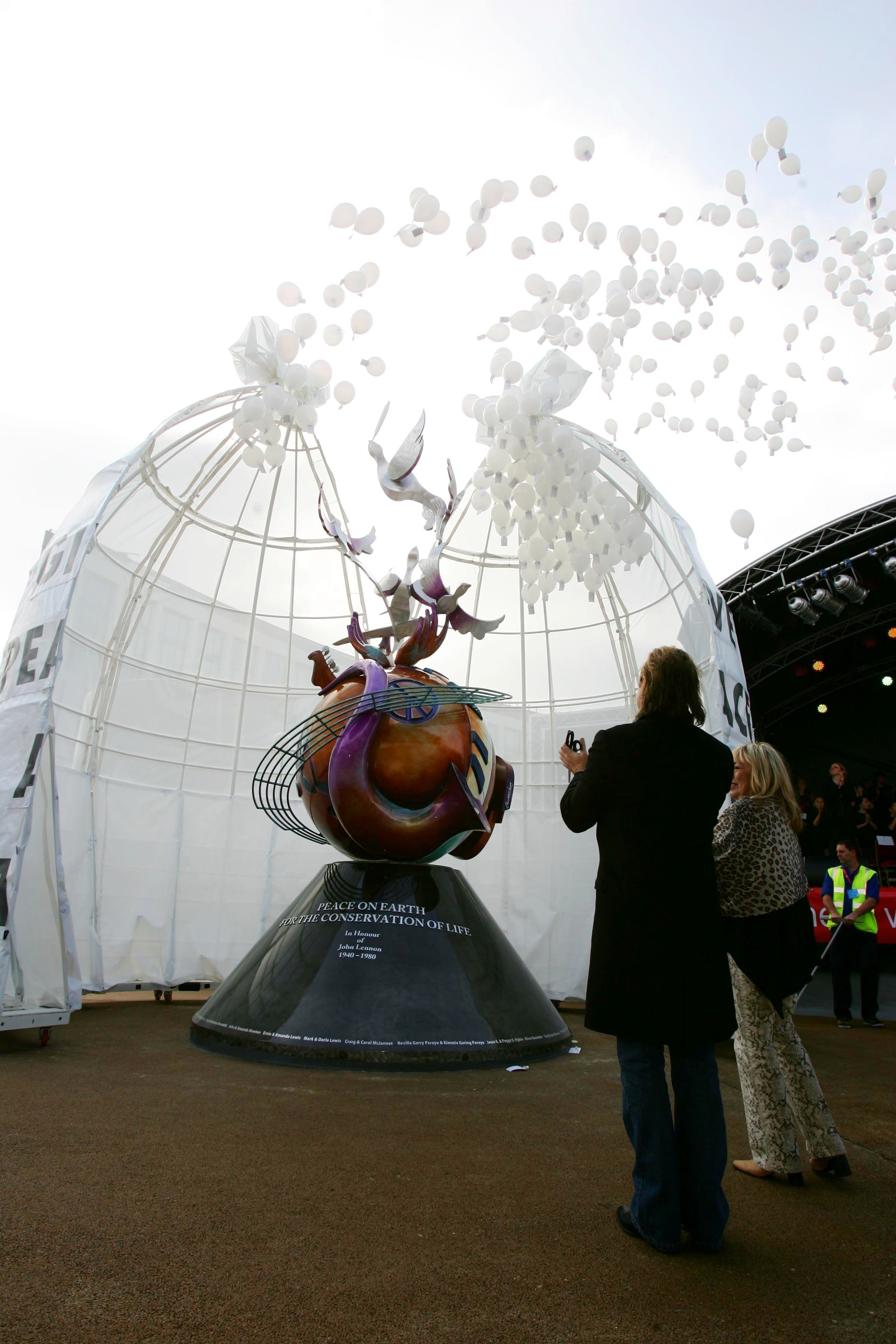
Unveiling by Julian and Cynthia Lennon, 9 October 2010

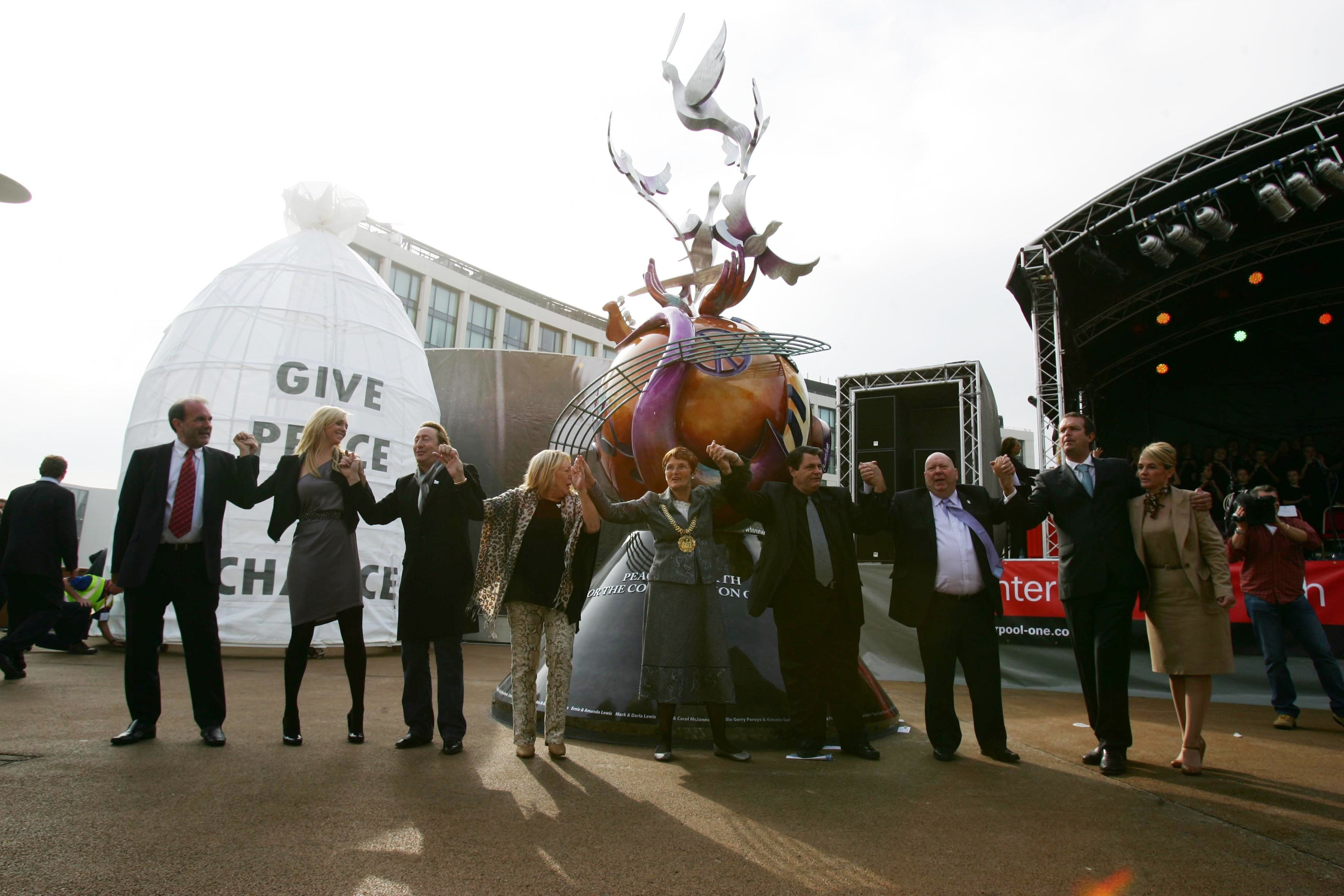
Unveiling: Julian and Cynthia Lennon and artist Lauren Voiers, 9 October 2010

The significance of the white feather is explained by Julian Lennon, "Dad once said to me that should he pass away, if there was some way of letting me know he was going to be OK – that we were all going to be OK – the message would come to me in the form of a white feather."

Jerry Goldman, managing director of The Beatles Story, Liverpool, comments:

Lennon’s message of peace is timeless and is one that is now more relevant than ever. We hope that this imposing monument dedicated to John will become a place that people from all over the world will visit to contemplate peace and John Lennon’s contribution to it through his music.
Liverpool is the only ideal destination for such a remarkable monument and we feel sure that it will take on a global significance as word travels round the world that there is a place to go to in England where people can meet under the timeless banner of peace.

The monument is the second peace monument to be gifted by the Global Peace Initiative; the first being the peace monument for Asia which has a permanent home in Singapore. There are plans for a third monument to be gifted to the people of South America as part of a pledge by the Global Peace Initiative to reach out to all continents.

At the unveiling ceremony at Chavasse Park in 2010, Liverpool City Council leader Joe Anderson said:

The statue is there as a celebration of John's legacy.
The Global Peace Initiative picking John and wanting the monument in Liverpool is a real mark of the great man's incredible achievements and the fact he touched millions and millions of lives.

At the same event, Julian Lennon told the crowd, which included European ambassadors, Beatles former drummer Pete Best and hundreds of Liverpudlians:

We come here with our hearts to honour Dad and pray for peace and say thank you to everybody who is celebrating today.

Cynthia Lennon said:

I think the mourning is over for John. I think it’s time to celebrate which is what we’re doing, thinking about his life which was positive and good, enjoying the joy he had and we all have from hearing his music.

== Vigil ==
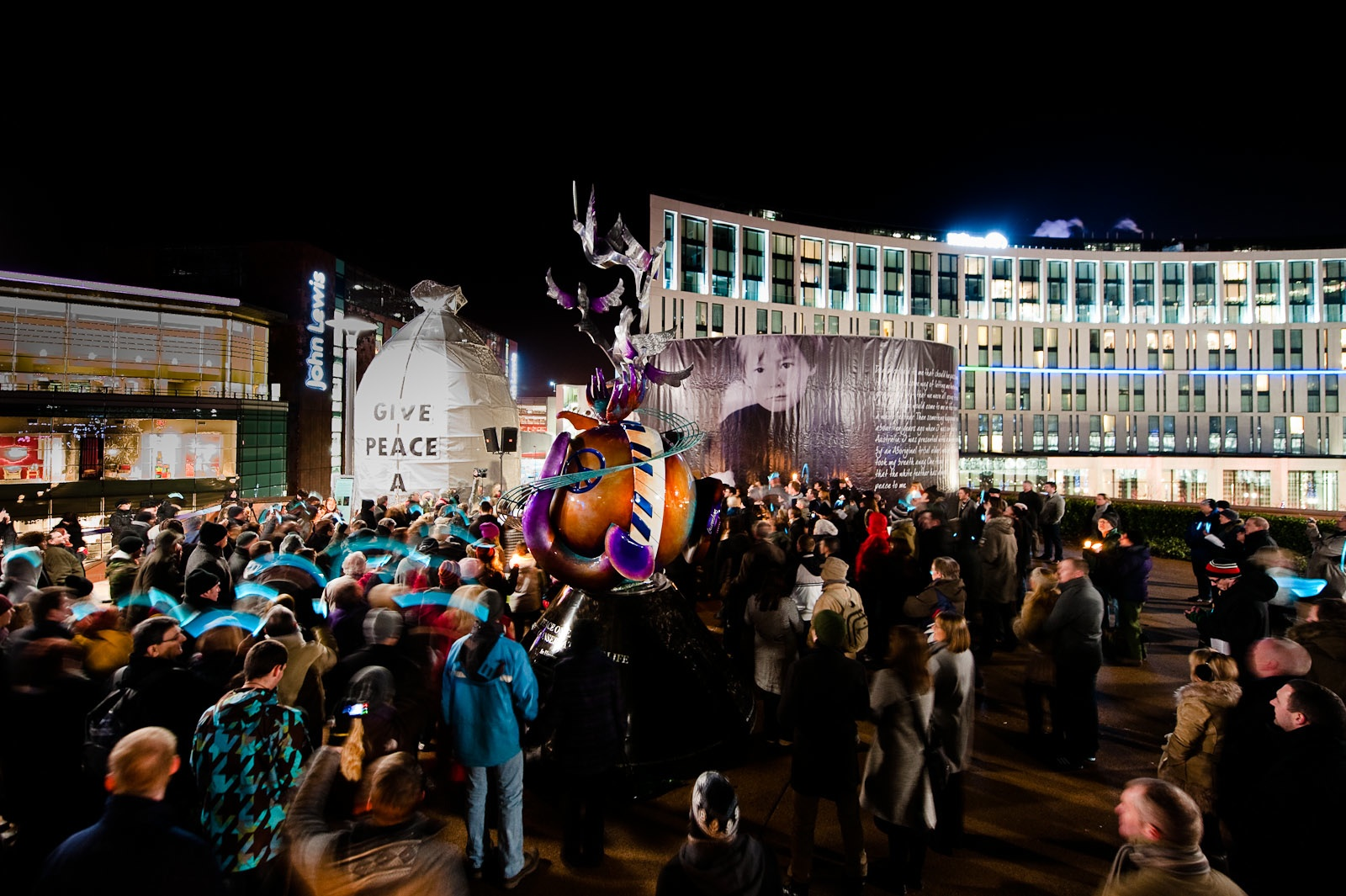
Vigil, 8 December 2010

Fans made their way to Liverpool on 8 December 2010 to mark the 30th anniversary of John Lennon's death with a candlelit vigil at the Peace Monument.
