= Liverpool Experience Campus =

Multi-purpose event and conference facility in Liverpool, England

- Liverpool Experience Campus

General information
- Type: Exhibition and conference eentre
- Location: Kings Dock, Liverpool, England
- Coordinates: 53.3971°N 2.9912°W
- Opening: 22 May 2008
- Cost: £164 million
- Owner: Liverpool City Council

Design and construction
- Architect: Wilkinson Eyre
- Structural engineer: Buro Happold

Liverpool Experience Campus (abbreviated LEX) is a multi-purpose event complex on the former Kings Dock, Liverpool, England. Formerly known as ACC Liverpool, it opened in May 2008 and consists of the interconnected Liverpool Arena, convention and exhibition centre, positioned on the banks of Liverpool's heritage waterfront.

In 2016, the four-star Pullman Liverpool Hotel was opened within the complex, offering luxury accommodation with its 216 bedrooms.

== History ==
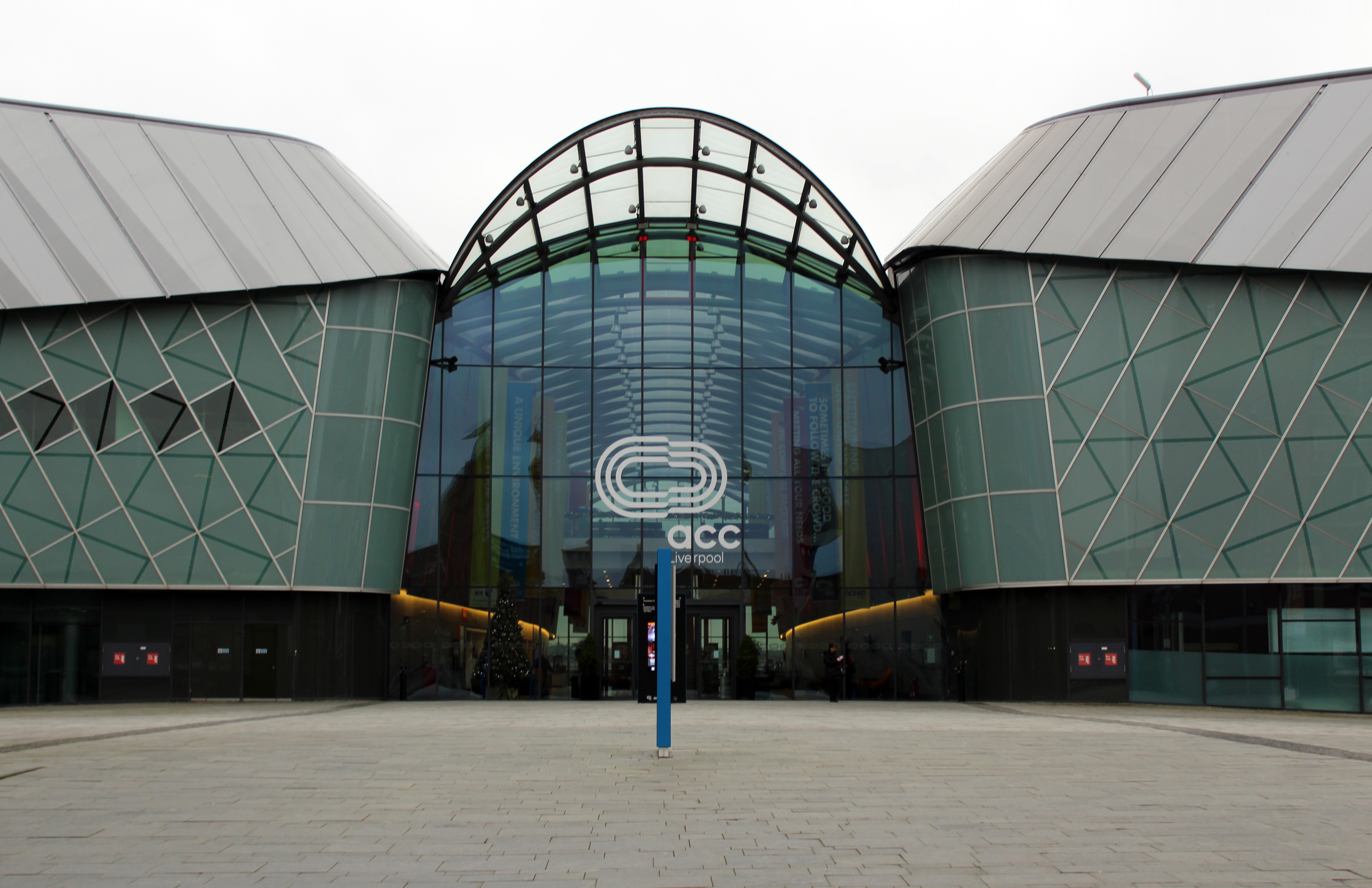
The entrance to the ACC Liverpool (December 2017)

ACC Liverpool was officially opened by Queen Elizabeth II and Prince Philip on 22 May 2008.

On the evening of 31 December 2017, a fire broke out in the car park and as a consequence, the Liverpool International Horse Show, taking place at the arena, had to be cancelled. The horses were safely evacuated from temporary stabling built on the ground floor level of the car park, and held on the arena floor and the land surrounding the building. The fire continued into the small hours of 1 January 2018. The structure had to be demolished later and cars were removed. Virtually all of the 1,400 cars there were destroyed, but no serious harm to people or horses was reported.

== Facilities ==
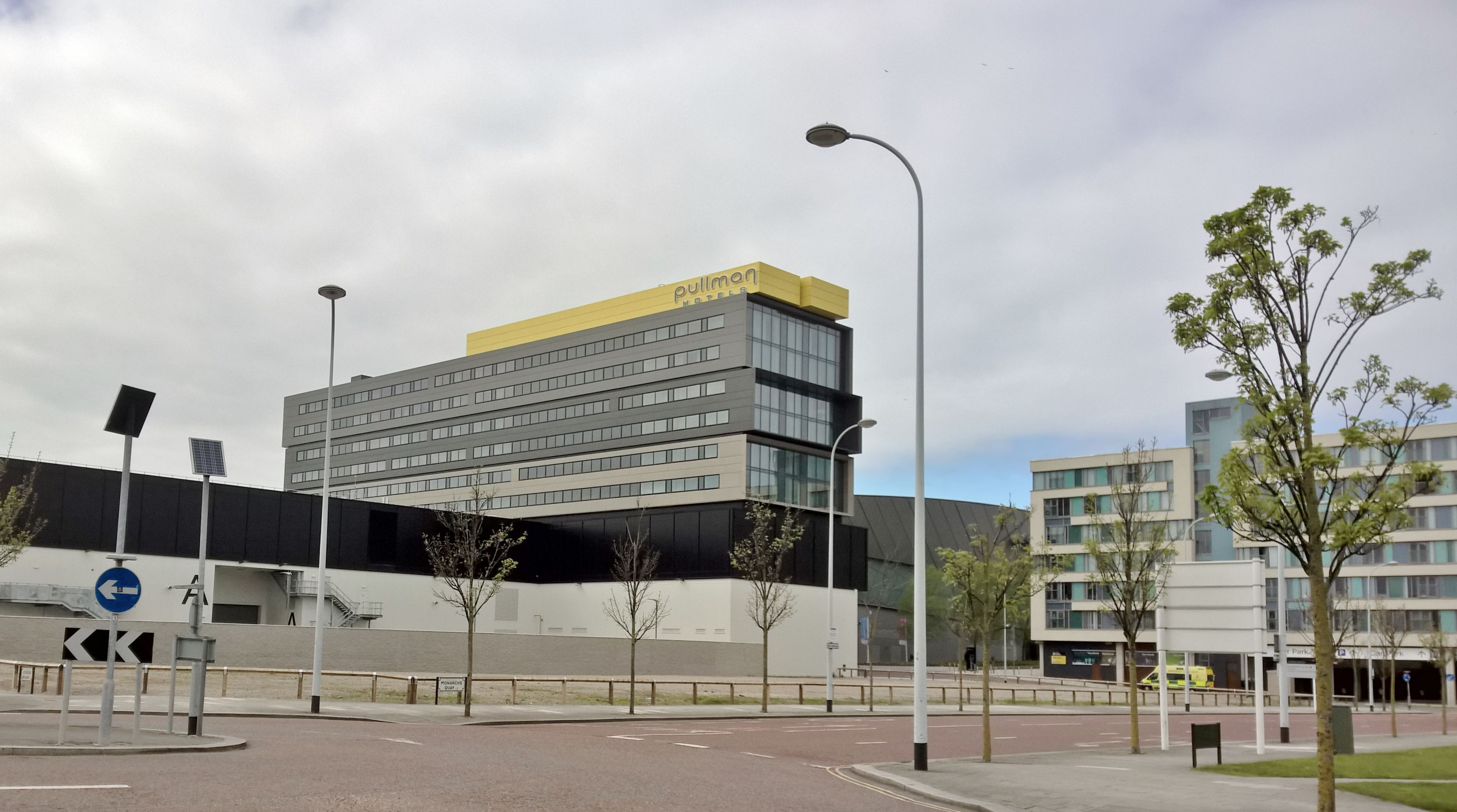
Pullman Hotel in April 2017

The building, designed by Wilkinson Eyre, Sport Concepts and Buro Happold, has a 3,725 square metre multipurpose hall on the ground floor, with a 1,500 capacity auditorium and 21 break out rooms above. The arena has capacity for 10,600 people.

Large events can take advantage of the Liverpool Experience Campus' interconnected facilities. By using the connecting lower Galleria, it is possible to extend exhibitions into the arena's 3,400m2 open floor area. This gives a total exhibition floor space of 7,125m2.

Exhibition Centre Liverpool, connected by a covered bridge, gives an additional 8,100m2 of multi-purpose exhibition space. The exhibition centre is also linked internally to the onsite 4* Pullman Liverpool hotel.

The John Lennon Peace Monument (Peace & Harmony) is a sculpture by Lauren Voiers exhibited on the waterfront adjacent to ACC Liverpool. It is also referred to as the European Peace Monument.

== Events ==
Since 2011, Liverpool Experience Campus has regularly hosted the Labour Party's annual conference. Alternating between venues and locations, the Convention Centre in Liverpool along with its interconnecting sister venues, Liverpool Arena and Exhibition Centre Liverpool part of Liverpool Experience Campus, has hosted Labour Party conference five times to 2023. In 2023, the conference was attended by 18,000 party members, businesses, and visitors drawing in an estimated £29m for the local economy.
