= Grand Theft Auto: London 1969 =

Mission pack for Grand Theft Auto

- Developer: Rockstar Canada (Note: PlayStation port developed by Runecraft)
- Publisher: Rockstar Games
- Director: Greg Bick
- Producers: Dan Houser; Lucien King
- Designers: Greg Bick; Sergei Kuprejanov; Blair Renaud
- Programmers: Kevin Hoare; Gary J. Foreman
- Artists: Ray Larabie; Adam Holbrough; Pete Armstrong
- Writer: Dan Houser
- Series: Grand Theft Auto
- Platforms: MS-DOS; PlayStation; Windows
- Release: 30 April 1999
- Genre: Action-adventure
- Mode: Single-player

Grand Theft Auto Mission Pack #1: London 1969 is an expansion pack for the 1997 action-adventure game Grand Theft Auto, developed by Rockstar Canada and published by Rockstar Games. It was released for PC (MS-DOS and Windows) and PlayStation in April 1999. The expansion adheres to the same gameplay mechanics as the main game and takes place in a fictionalised version of London during the 1960s. Players assume the role of a criminal who works for several London-based crime syndicates, and complete levels by achieving a set score, within an open world environment that allows them to do whatever they wish alongside linear jobs to achieve their goal.

The expansion pack was met with mixed reviews. It won the 1999 BAFTA Interactive Entertainment Award in the "Sound" category. A second, freeware expansion, Grand Theft Auto Mission Pack #2: London 1961, was released for PC in July 1999, to coincide with the release of the Grand Theft Auto games on the internet. It is much shorter in length, and features the same map and characters as London 1969, but takes place eight years prior.

== Gameplay ==
Like Grand Theft Auto, the expansion pack consists of several levels which the player must complete, to unlock the next one in the chain. All elements from the main game persist in London 1969, including achieving a target score to complete a level, doing jobs by initiating them at ringing phone-boxes, earning a multiplier for successful jobs, and making points from any form of action in the game. However, in contrast to the main game's three settings, the expansion pack focuses on a single location – the real-life city of London during the late 1960s – and incorporates aesthetic elements from the setting's period, such as vehicles and British slang ("Busted", the title used for being arrested, is replaced with the British equivalent, "Nicked", for example).

== Development and release ==
Grand Theft Auto: London 1969 was developed by Rockstar Games through its Rockstar Canada studio. The game's assets were made using GTACars, a third-party utility used for modding the original Grand Theft Auto. The PlayStation port was handled by Runecraft. The game features the voice of art critic and novelist John Berger, who voiced the Crisp Twins in one of the game's cutscenes.

Announced in February 1999 by Take-Two Interactive, Rockstar Games' parent company, London 1969 was marketed as the first add-on pack to be released for the PlayStation and had a tentative release date of April that year. The pack was originally due to be published by Gathering of Developers, another Take-Two label. The PC version was released to manufacturing by 22 April 1999 and set to release in the week thereafter. Both the PC and PlayStation versions were released by Rockstar Games on 30 April 1999, both as a standalone purchase and as part of Grand Theft Auto: Director's Cut, a compilation also including the original Grand Theft Auto.

A freeware, downloadable expansion for London 1969, titled Grand Theft Auto: London 1961, was announced in June 1999. It was released on 1 July 1999 in tandem with and through the website for Grand Theft Auto 2.

=== Special Edition ===
A stand-alone version of London 1969, called Grand Theft Auto: London – Special Edition, was released for PlayStation in 2000 in the United Kingdom. This version of the game can be played without requiring a copy of the original Grand Theft Auto disc to operate.

== Reception ==
Reception

Aggregate score
Aggregator	Score
GameRankings	PC: 75% PS1: 69%

Review scores
Publication	Score
Eurogamer	PC: 9/10
GameSpot	PC: 5.9/10; PS1: 5.9/10
IGN	PC: 7.8/10; PS1: 7.5/10
Next Generation	3/5

Grand Theft Auto: London 1969 was released to mixed reviews. GameRankings, which assigns a normalised rating out of 100, calculated an average score of 75% based on nine reviews for the PC version, while the PlayStation port scored 69% based on eleven reviews.

Next Generation reviewed the PlayStation version of the game, rating it three stars out of five, and stated that it was "an enjoyable, if short lived, romp on the seamier side of the hippie-era Brit night life."

The expansion was generally seen as having very little in the way of improvement upon the original Grand Theft Auto. Jeff Gerstmann of GameSpot thought the game "still manages to be reasonably fun" but concluded it "really doesn't hold a candle to GTA's original three cities". Ron Dulin, also of GameSpot, found "there isn't much new in Grand Theft Auto: London 1969" other than cosmetic changes and that "all of the gameplay problems [from the base game] remain". He criticised the lack of development citing "poor control, frustrating mission design, and mediocre graphics". A reviewer for Eurogamer agreed saying "like the original game, is not a great looker. The graphics are highly pixelated and scrolling isn't the smoothest". In a more positive review for IGN, Jay Boor highlighted that "GTA London 1969 boasts 36 new missions, 30 new vehicles and most importantly, unlimited criminal opportunity" though admitted "the open ended gameplay doesn't really have you doing anything different [from the original GTA]".

In contrast to the controls and visuals, the audio was universally well received. IGN's Doug Perry declared it "the very best attraction to GTA London [with] its accurate, retro '60s sound". Boor agreed stating "the soundtrack creates an amazing London vibe" while in a review for Eurogamer it was stated "the superb music" is what "makes the game tick".

=== Sales ===
London 1969 topped the UK charts in its first two weeks of availability.
