= Grand Theft Auto modding =

Modification in the video game series

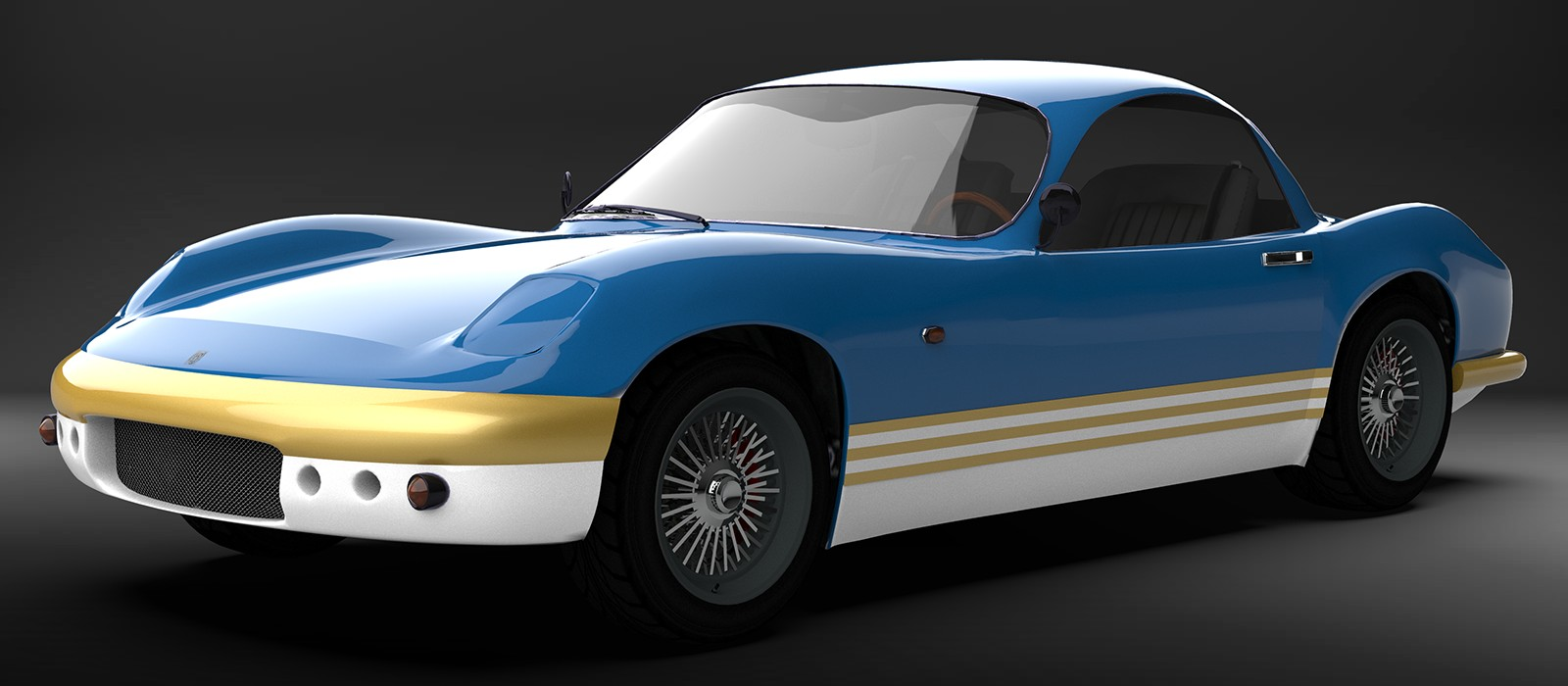
While vehicles in the Grand Theft Auto series are loosely based on real-world makes and models, custom vehicle models are a popular form of modification throughout the GTA community.

User modification, or modding, of video games in the open world sandbox Grand Theft Auto series is a popular trend in the PC gaming community. These unofficial modifications are made by altering gameplay logic and asset files within a user's game installation, and can change the player's experience to varying degrees. Frequently created by anonymous modders, modifications are presented in the form of downloadable files or archives. Third-party software has been indispensable for building Grand Theft Auto mods, due to the lack of official editing tools from the developer, Rockstar Games. Mods for Grand Theft Auto are generally developed for use on the PC versions of the games, since the platform does not prevent modifications to installed software; however, similar content for console and mobile phone versions does exist to an extent.

== Background ==
While mods for Grand Theft Auto have been developed by hobbyists since the release of the first game, mods only became more accessible and popular with the release of Grand Theft Auto III on Microsoft Windows in May 2002. The use of a 3D game engine (the first in the series) allowed development of custom vehicles, textures and character models, followed by new missions and map modifications; the success of these new types of mods started to attract widespread attention. In the following years, the modding scene became more sophisticated and complex, as various aspects of the game's internals were gradually being discovered and documented by hackers. One of the best-known examples is the iCEnhancer graphics modification for Grand Theft Auto IV by Hayssam Keilany, praised by reviewers and labelled as "arguably one of the best mods of all time" by Polygon.

In most of the games, certain data files were stored in simple archives or plain text files, allowing modders to edit them using basic tools. However, more complex modifications, such as changes to the gameplay mechanics or the addition of custom models and/or maps, were not possible without more advanced tools specific to GTA, along with commercial-grade modelling programs such as SketchUp, 3ds Max, Blender and Zmodeler. For this reason, modders would often collaborate on various fan sites, pooling resources and sharing documentation with one another. In a quote by Patrick Wildenborg, the modder responsible for unlocking the Hot Coffee minigame, he stated that "the modding community felt like a bunch of friends trying to solve a mystery".

== Online modding communities ==
We know for a fact that there is a significant percentage of GTA fans who only buy the game for the PC because of the open-ended modification possibilities.

— Unnamed modder cited in Jacked: The Outlaw Story of Grand Theft Auto

Grand Theft Auto fan communities have been essential to the growth of the modding scene. Modders were able to exchange knowledge and team up in order to create new tools, mods and documentation. GTA communities, Internet forums, and fan sites have also been essential, as they serve as hosts for mods. Besides YouTube, sites such as GTANet, GTAinside, GTA V Mods and The GTA Place serve as platforms for content exchange and discussion about modding and the Grand Theft Auto series in general.

=== FiveM ===
FiveM, an alternative multiplayer and role-playing modification for Grand Theft Auto V, amassed a concurrent player count of 250,000 on Steam in April 2021, surpassing that of the base game. Earlier in February, Grand Theft Auto V became the most-watched category on Twitch due to an update for NoPixel, one of FiveM's largest servers which costs around $10,000 monthly in hosting costs.

On 11 August 2023, Rockstar Games announced that it had acquired Cfx.re, the developers of FiveM. In the announcement, Rockstar stated it would "help [Cfx.re] find new ways to support this incredible community and improve the services they provide to their developers and players".

In February 2025, a comprehensive document titled "The Fall of FiveM" was published, detailing internal conflicts, management issues, and the departure of the original developers following Rockstar Games' acquisition of Cfx.re in 2023. The document also discusses the development of the Rockstar Online Modding Engine (ROME), an official modding platform, which is speculated to eventually replace FiveM.

=== LCPDFR and LSPDFR ===
LCPDFR and LSPDFR are modifications released for Grand Theft Auto IV and Grand Theft Auto V that convert their respective games into a law enforcement simulator. The mod's developers, G17 Media, also develop RDRFR, a similar law enforcement simulator conversion for Red Dead Redemption 2. As of January 2022, LSPDFR has almost 12 million downloads, and LCPDFR has 2.5 million downloads; the mods' website, LCPDFR.com, also hosts over 42,000 additional third-party mod files and has over 732,000 registered users.

LCPDFR and LSPDFR made news in Australia in 2017, when New South Wales Police Minister Troy Grant denounced the mods on Seven News, calling the ability to install addons based on the NSW Police and harm in-game NSW Police officers or potentially commit police brutality as them "perverse" and "inaccurate". Grant's statements were met with criticism from the LSPDFR community, including a developer of one of the NSW Police mods, who said their content was harmless and that they "inspired kids to think of a career in the emergency services field".

==== Decision-making study ====
Researchers at Brigham Young University and UBC Sauder School of Business conducted a decision-making study in partnership with LSPDFR, with the goal of studying how players behave in law-enforcement situations. The study included a survey and optional data collection of players while using the modification. The study has since closed and results are being analyzed.

== Aspects of GTA modding ==
Grand Theft Auto V's release on the PC offers many advantages over the console release. Yet all of these pale in comparison to the most important advantage of all; modifications.

— Matthew S. Smith and Gabe Gurwin of Digital Trends, 9 May 2015

Mods are a part of the Grand Theft Auto franchise's success on PCs. Their popularity added on to the longevity and further success of the GTA series, and complex modifications such as Zombie Alarm and LSPDFR offer entirely new experiences. Modding served as one of main channels for innovations in gameplay. The best example of this is arguably Grand Theft Auto: San Andreas, which boasts one of the largest modding communities in PC gaming. New modifications are still released for the game decades after its release.

When Grand Theft Auto V was released on PC in 2015, the breakthrough of new mods depended on the creation of new GTA V-specific modification tools. While GTA IV already had many mods and tools due to its age, GTA V modders had difficulties creating mods until completely new tools were made. One of the most notable tools created was OpenIV, a file exploring and editing program allowing for easy manipulation of the game files.

As GTA Online is built as a component of GTA V, it has been a subject of mods which intentionally caused negative effects on players' experiences. Because many mods in the form of in-game cheats were added to GTA Online, Rockstar developed an isolated section where those who used cheats in GTA Online would temporarily be placed. Prior to Grand Theft Auto IV and GTA Online, mods such as San Andreas Multiplayer and Multi Theft Auto were developed in lieu of an official multiplayer component for previous titles.

Although major mod hosting websites (such as GTAinside or GTAGarage) often check mods for possible malware, content infected with viruses and rogue software occasionally slip through. As such, modding websites began to screen content owners and their works for any malicious content or similar quality or security issues.

=== Reaction from Rockstar Games ===
Our primary focus is on protecting GTA Online against modifications that could give players an unfair advantage, disrupt gameplay, or cause griefing.

— Rockstar Games, Asked & Answered from 7 May 2015

Modification of Grand Theft Auto is not endorsed by Rockstar and as such there is no official editor tool that allows manipulation of in-game files. In an answer to a question made by a fan, Rockstar expressed their views on GTA modification, stating that they have always appreciated the efforts of the modding community and still gladly remember classic mods like Zombie Invasion or the original Grand Theft Auto III map on Grand Theft Auto IV. They also declared that their modding policy has not changed and is same as for GTA IV. The end-user licence agreement contradicts this however, as it states users may not "reverse engineer, decompile, disassemble, display, perform, prepare derivative works based on, or otherwise modify the Software, in whole or in part".

For the release of Grand Theft Auto V for PC, Rockstar indicated that its primary focus was ensuring that Grand Theft Auto Online was free of possible hacks and exploits, and that therefore modding would not be allowed in Online.

In August 2015, several members of the FiveM team had their Rockstar Games Social Club accounts suspended due to their involvement in an alternative multiplayer client for Grand Theft Auto V. Upon being contacted by Kotaku regarding the issue, Rockstar stated that the FiveM client was an unauthorized modification "designed to facilitate piracy" and that as such, it violated the terms of use and therefore members were banned from the Social Club service.

While Rockstar has previously provided some support with the original Grand Theft Auto and Grand Theft Auto 2, and even used a third-party utility for developing the Grand Theft Auto: London expansion packs, the only official modification tool Rockstar has released is Rockstar Editor, a tool which allows users to record and edit videos in-game. Options such as effects, audio, speed, cameras, and navigation tools are made available to the player.

In August 2023, Rockstar announced they were acquiring FiveM as part of an acquisition of Cfx.re.

=== Impact of the Hot Coffee mod ===
Before NIMF and [Leland] Yee warned everybody about Hot Coffee, we only had a couple of thousand downloads on the mod, after the media panic, over a million! In late summer of last year, our server was pushing like 7 TB of data a month.

— Illspirit, a modder and administrator from GTAGarage (where Hot Coffee first appeared), speaking with Gamasutra

Hot Coffee is a normally inaccessible mini-game in Grand Theft Auto: San Andreas. The mini-game portrays crudely animated sexual intercourse between the game's protagonist, Carl Johnson, and a chosen partner. After Patrick Wildenborg, a software engineer who also went by the alias "PatrickW", modified the game to make the mini-game accessible, Hot Coffee quickly gained notoriety worldwide, impacting consumer culture, politics and the video game industry as a whole.

Rockstar initially blamed a "determined group of hackers" for hacking the base game and creating the mini-game from scratch. This claim was eventually refuted, as the mini-game's code and assets had been developed by Rockstar and were already present, unfinished and abandoned, on the game disc: the mod simply made the existing content available to players. Rockstar would go on to indicate that they expected the ESRB rating to remain unchanged, as they had no control over the modifications applied to the game post-release. However, the ESRB chose to have the rating changed to Adults Only, with the modding community taking the blame. The ESRB later called on the video game industry to "proactively protect their games from illegal modifications by third parties, particularly when they serve to undermine the accuracy of the rating". In his interview for CNET, David Kushner explained that some modders were "scared" that Rockstar would prevent modifications to their games after Hot Coffee, but noted that once the controversy had passed the outcome was of refined ESRB guidelines rather that increased regulation, and a renewed public appreciation for mature content in video games. Of the controversy and eventual fallout, Gamasutra wrote that "The treatment left many in the GTA mod community with mixed feelings".

=== Brazilian modifications ===
In 2011, a 2009 modification for San Andreas known as "GTA Torcidas" was criticized by the Brazilian media. In the game, player-controlled characters with clothes changed to real football clubs could attack rival fans in several different places while escaping from the police and other authorities. This led to a ban of the original game in several cities, such as Goiânia, for being seen as in "bad taste". When questioned about the content, the mod's creators claimed they did not intend to promote violence and that "Torcidas" was made for entertainment purposes. However, football groups and law experts rejected the idea, claiming it incited real crimes.

The PlayStation 2 versions of Vice City and San Andreas gained popularity in Brazil as they served as the basis for numerous bootleg mods which are distributed by street vendors and other such resellers in the country. The most famous of these are reskins and total conversions produced by a team known as Geomatrix, such as a mod for Vice City which allows players to play as Jason and Lucia from Grand Theft Auto VI ahead of the game's release.

=== Other legal issues ===
A weapon replacement for GTA V, which replaces the game's sticky bomb weapon with an exploding Samsung Galaxy Note 7 as a parody of the phone's battery explosion issue and subsequent recall, attracted controversy when Samsung Electronics America, Inc. reportedly issued takedown notices to YouTube demanding that videos depicting the phone be taken down as an alleged violation of its copyrights. The Verge called this "bogus", and a "ridiculous overreach and misuse of the DMCA", while it was also believed that these takedowns would only draw further attention to the content. Although Samsung has attempted to take down videos depicting the mod, it has not targeted websites hosting the mod itself.

On 14 June 2017, Take-Two Interactive sent a cease and desist to the developers of OpenIV, a program that allows users to install modifications for various Rockstar titles such as Grand Theft Auto IV, Max Payne 3 and Grand Theft Auto V, claiming that OpenIV allowed third-parties to modify and defeat the security features of its software. Rockstar later responded by saying that "Take-Two's actions were not specifically targeting single player mods... We are working to figure out how we can continue to support the creative community without negatively impacting our players." In a statement on 23 June, Rockstar said that Take-Two had agreed not to take legal action against third-party single-player modding projects involving Rockstar's games on PC. Rockstar also contacted the developers of OpenIV, in an effort to resolve the dispute. Although the details of said meeting remain undisclosed, shortly afterwards OpenIV was made available to download – and received a minor update – indicating the conversation with Rockstar was successful. The cease and desist led to a review bomb from users, and caused a chilling effect with some mod developers discontinuing support for the game due to perceived legal ramifications with modding Grand Theft Auto V.

On 19 February 2021, representatives claiming to be from Take-Two Interactive sent DMCA takedown notices to the team behind re3 and reVC, which were source code recreations of Grand Theft Auto III and Grand Theft Auto: Vice City respectively, whose goal was a modernised and improved version of the games which can be ported and played on contemporary and future platforms. The representatives alleged that the source code recreations were an act of copyright infringement, stating that "The work is not licensed in any way," and had their respective GitHub repositories taken down as a result. Project leader aap cited the Super Mario 64 source code recreation as a precedent for the source code projects, noting that the Super Mario 64 repository is, as of 2021, still available despite Nintendo's reputation for aggressive litigation against copyright infringers. In April, Theo, a New Zealand-based developer who maintained a fork of the source code, filed a counter-notice on GitHub, claiming that the code does not contain any original work owned by Take-Two; per DMCA rules regarding disputes, Theo's content was restored after two weeks, though the original repository and other forks remained unavailable. In September 2021, Take-Two filed a lawsuit in California against the programmers, asserting that they "are well aware that they do not possess the right to copy, adapt, or distribute derivative GTA source code, or the audiovisual elements of the games, and that doing so constitutes copyright infringement".

On 16 January 2025, Liberty City Preservation Project mod—which sought to recreate Grand Theft Auto IV's Liberty City in Grand Theft Auto V—was shut down after its developers were contacted by Rockstar. The developers of the LCPP mod doubt that the takedown request was genuine.

On 23 January 2025, the YouTube channel of Revolution Team, developer of Grand Theft Auto IV mod Vice City: The Next-Gen Edition, a mod which sought to recreate Grand Theft Auto: Vice City in Grand Theft Auto IV, was taken down after an appeal from Take-Two Interactive. The mod itself remains available and released as a standalone title at that time of YouTube channel takedown.

=== Military use ===
In 2026 amidst the ongoing Russo-Ukrainian War, the Ukrainian combat drone training center WeTrueGun utilised the Quadcopter-Redux mod through the FiveM framework to help drone operators with navigation and targeting in urban environments. Though the game was used as part of drone pilot training, WeTrueGun emphasized that the use of Grand Theft Auto V was intended as a supplementary tool and as stress relief for operators rather than as a replacement for dedicated simulators.
