= Grand Theft Auto Advance =

2004 video game

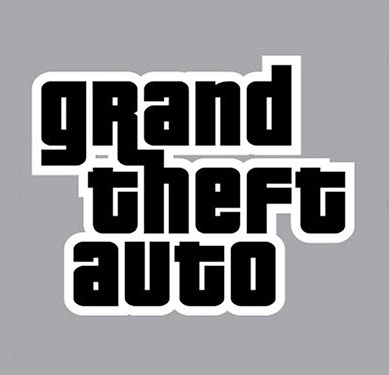
- Developer: Digital Eclipse
- Publisher: Rockstar Games
- Director: Michael Mika Sr.
- Producers: James Stanley; William S. Schmitt
- Programmer: Cathryn Mataga
- Artists: Boyd Burggrabe; Daniel Shallock
- Writer: James Stanley
- Series: Grand Theft Auto
- Platform: Game Boy Advance
- Release: NA: 26 October 2004; EU: 29 October 2004
- Genre: Action-adventure
- Mode: Single-player

Grand Theft Auto Advance (also marketed as Grand Theft Auto) is a 2004 action-adventure game developed by Digital Eclipse and published by Rockstar Games. The eighth entry in the Grand Theft Auto series, it was released for the Game Boy Advance in October 2004. The game takes place in Liberty City (a fictional parody of New York City), the same setting used for Grand Theft Auto III, to which it serves as a prequel. Set one year before Grand Theft Auto III's events, the story follows criminal Mike's quest for revenge after his partner's supposed death, which leads him to become entangled in a world of organised crime, gang warfare, and corruption.

The game is played from a top-down perspective, similar to the style used in Grand Theft Auto and Grand Theft Auto 2; despite this, it is part of the series' "3D universe" canon, sharing continuity with the three-dimensional games of the franchise. It also features most gameplay elements of the 3D Grand Theft Auto games, including the vehicle-based side missions, most weapons, the use of safe houses, and the style of the heads-up display. The game received mixed reviews from critics and was followed by Grand Theft Auto: Liberty City Stories, another Grand Theft Auto III prequel, in 2005.

== Gameplay ==
Title screen

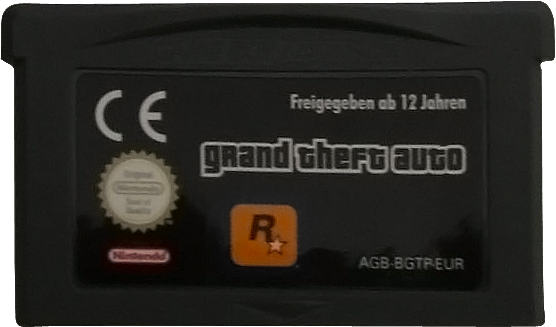
Game cartridge

Grand Theft Auto Advance is an action-adventure game set in an open world environment and played from a top-down perspective. The game had to be adapted to the Game Boy Advance's hardware limitations; as a result, it does not have animated cutscenes, nor does it have Grand Theft Auto III's pedestrian dialogue. All cutscenes are text-only, featuring hand-drawn pictures of the characters' faces and a thematic backdrop. The art style is consistent with that used for the cover and loading art of the three-dimensional releases in the series. Replacing the pedestrian dialogue, some soundbites taken from Grand Theft Auto III are played when the player hits someone's car. Short police radio voiceovers will announce the player's location and vehicle type when the player commits a crime.

The game does not feature radio channels. Like the Game Boy Color ports of Grand Theft Auto and Grand Theft Auto 2, each car has one fixed tune that is constantly repeated and cannot be changed. These include parts of some familiar Grand Theft Auto, Grand Theft Auto 2 and Grand Theft Auto III tunes, in instrumental versions. Despite this, billboards for the radio stations featured in Grand Theft Auto III can be seen throughout Liberty City.

== Synopsis ==
=== Setting and characters ===
The game is set in 2000 within Liberty City, the same setting used for Grand Theft Auto III. As the setting had to be recreated for the Game Boy Advance, much of it was noticeably changed in its conversion, including elements that were impossible to interpret from the game's top-view perspective. As a result of these changes, players familiar with the original setting have to explore it afresh in Grand Theft Auto Advance.

As a prequel to Grand Theft Auto III, the game features both new and returning characters. The protagonist is an original character named Mike, who in his quest to avenge the supposed death of his partner, Vinnie, crosses paths with several prominent criminals that offer him assistance. These include explosives expert and firearms trader 8-Ball, Yardies leader King Courtney, and yakuza co-leader Asuka Kasen, all previously featured in Grand Theft Auto III, although their characters received significant changes in appearance and lifestyle to reflect who they were one year prior.

=== Plot ===
Small-time criminal Mike works with the more connected criminal Vinnie in hopes of leaving Liberty City together and retiring from their life of crime. Vinnie convinces Mike to do work for the Mafia to achieve this goal. However, after several jobs, Vinnie is seemingly killed in a car bomb explosion, which also destroys all of their money. Mike vows revenge, and quickly falls out with the Mafia as he investigates Vinnie's murder. After carrying out some jobs for 8-Ball, an explosives expert and old acquaintance of Vinnie's, he points Mike to a bartender named Jonnie, who maintains connections with the city's criminal underworld and might help him find the answers he seeks. Jonnie hires Mike for several jobs while they investigate Vinnie's murder together, until the former is suddenly killed midway through the investigation.

While searching for the killer, Mike spots some Yardies leaving Jonnie's bar in a rush, and follows them to their leader, King Courtney. Courtney denies involvement in Jonnie's murder, claiming that his men were only sent to collect money Jonnie owed to him, and offers to help find the true culprit. After carrying out some jobs for him, Courtney points Mike to Colombian Cartel leader Cisco. When Mike confronts Cisco, however, he quickly realises that the man is innocent and that Courtney has been using him to eliminate his rivals. Mike then begins working separately for the Cartel and their main rivals, the yakuza, led by Asuka Kasen, in hopes either gang will aid his investigation. After Cisco is suddenly killed, Mike pursues the murderer and is shocked to find a still-living Vinnie, who reveals that he faked his own death to flee Liberty City with their money, and killed both Jonnie and Cisco to ensure Mike never learned the truth. Enraged at his former partner's betrayal, Mike kills Vinnie and takes his money, despite Vinnie's warnings that every criminal in the city will now target him for his wealth.

While meeting with 8-Ball to tell him how his investigation ended, Mike is attacked by the Cartel, who mistakenly assumed that he had killed Cisco. Although Mike escapes the ambush, 8-Ball is injured during the shootout and subsequently arrested by the police. After dealing with the Cartel's new leader, Mike learns that Courtney plans to kill him and steal his money, and meets with Asuka one final time to organise an attack on Courtney's hideout. Aided by the yakuza, Mike storms the hideout and fends off waves of Yardies before confronting and injuring Courtney. As the police arrive at the hideout, Mike is forced to escape before he can finish off Courtney. Evading the police, Mike heads to the airport and leaves Liberty City in Cisco's private jet. He reminisces about his fallen friends and heads to Colombia to start a new life with his wealth.

== Reception ==
Reception

Aggregate score
Aggregator	Score
Metacritic	68/100

Review scores
Publication	Score
Game Informer	7.5/10
GameSpot	6.5/10
IGN	8.5/10

Grand Theft Auto Advance received "mixed or average" reviews, according to review aggregator website Metacritic.

The graphics of the game received mixed to positive commentary from critics, who likened it to other Game Boy Advance games. Craig Harris of IGN said that the game "does a good job of looking like the old GTA games." Loki of Game Chronicles said that the game uses "plenty of tricks" to give it a "3D feel," and that there is a "real sense of depth and perspective as you gaze down upon Liberty City." Conversely, 1UP staff said that the game has "flat visuals" that are a "poor leap" compared to previous games in the Grand Theft Auto series.

The game's music received mixed reactions. IGN's Craig Harris said that the songs on the radio stations in the vehicles are "pretty repetitive and aren't so great." 1UP.com's Scott Sharkey stated that the music is "pretty bad," and named the radio tracks "very short and repetitive." Jeff Gerstmann of GameSpot commented on the camera movements while driving, and that it "doesn't zoom out far enough to give you a good view of the road."
