= Multi Theft Auto =

Grand Theft Auto multiplayer modification

- Developer: MTA Team
- Release: 9 February 2003; 23 years ago
- Stable release: 1.6.0 / 16 June 2023; 3 years ago
- Written in: C++ and Lua
- Engine: RenderWare
- Operating system: Microsoft Windows; Linux
- Type: Third-person shooter multiplayer mod
- License: GNU General Public License v3
- Website: multitheftauto.com
- Repository: github.com/multitheftauto/

Multi Theft Auto (MTA) is a multiplayer modification for the Microsoft Windows version of Rockstar North games Grand Theft Auto III, Grand Theft Auto: Vice City and Grand Theft Auto: San Andreas that adds online multiplayer functionality. For Grand Theft Auto: San Andreas, the mod also serves as a derivative engine to Rockstar's interpretation of RenderWare.

== History ==
=== Background ===
The release of Grand Theft Auto III, a critically acclaimed sandbox-style action-adventure computer and video game developed by DMA Design (now Rockstar North) represented the first 3D title in the Grand Theft Auto (GTA) series. Despite its success, it was the first Grand Theft Auto game to ship without the network multiplayer gameplay features that were present in earlier titles, which allowed players to connect through a computer network and play the game with others.

The first version of Multi Theft Auto, dubbed Grand Theft Auto III: Alternative Multiplayer, attempted to fill in this gap by extending an already existing cheating tool with functionality that allowed the game to be played with a very crude form of two-player racing over a computer network purely as a proof of concept, similar to how the now-defunct XBAND service worked by manipulating game memory in order to add online multiplayer functionality. Newer versions of Multi Theft Auto with increasingly better gameplay and other improvements were released based on the same concept of game manipulation, by a small team of developers.

With the introduction of successor Grand Theft Auto: Vice City, it became clear that this computer game title also lacked any form of network gameplay. The Multi Theft Auto software was subsequently extended to include support for this title, and eventually shifted its entire focus towards this title and the concept of a new software framework dubbed Blue. As the original concept (of game manipulation by memory) was prone to various problems with performance and stability that often resulted in application crashes, this new framework was created as a successor and laid the foundation of all future Multi Theft Auto software.

=== Development ===
A screenshot of one of the earlier closed MTA:SA deathmatch (alpha version)

The latest Multi Theft Auto version is based on code injection and hooking techniques whereby the game is manipulated without altering any original files supplied with the game. The software functions as a game engine that installs itself as an extension of the original game, adding core functionality such as networking and GUI rendering while exposing the original game's engine functionality through a scripting language.

The Multi Theft Auto: San Andreas project was revised and relaunched as an open-source project, leaving all prior versions behind. The source code was licensed under the GPLv3 license and made available on GitHub.

== Multi Theft Auto: San Andreas ==
Multi Theft Auto's latest release is for the game Grand Theft Auto: San Andreas and is built upon a now open source game engine that has been in development for several years and is the only project that is still actively maintained. The engine provides users with all the necessary tools they need to create their own game modes and maps by exposing a large part of the original game functionality through a Lua scripting machine.

The initial version of the software was dubbed "Race" and unveiled on Sunday 22 January 2006, when the first playable content was released. This version featured a networked vehicle racing game mode and a map editor that allowed users to create custom environments and races. The advanced nature of the engine's early incarnation allowed the developers to develop a sophisticated integrated WYSIWYG editor for adding gameplay elements such as checkpoints, spawn points, power-ups and various objects ranging from ramps to exploding barrels.

The successor release, dubbed "Deathmatch", was designed to improve upon "Race" by providing minimal sandbox style gameplay that could be extended by users and developers. The production on this release started shortly after the initial release, but stagnated due to what is seen as a lack of focus by the development team. As many new features were being introduced, the continuous introduction of these features delayed a stable and final version of the modification. Instead, several on-line facilities were introduced during the development phase to allow visitors to track the development process of the software as changes were made to the code repository, illustrating any notable updates to the progress of the modification.

The first "Deathmatch" successor was introduced as a fully playable version on 2 January 2008 and tagged as "Developer Preview" to promote the third-party development of custom gameplay content and utilities. This version was followed by a second "Developer Preview" that introduced several new features and fixes and was subsequently followed by a period of major code restructuring that led to the open-source relaunch on Friday, 21 November 2008 under the GPLv3 License.

On Saturday, 22 August, Multi Theft Auto: San Andreas v1.0 was officially distributed as the first open source release. This release abandoned the now obsolete "Deathmatch" tag in the product name to emphasize on the versatility of the software. Gameplay functionality is solely provided by the scripting language, so users can choose or develop their own combination of scripts and other contents to customize and host their own type of game.

=== Content delivery and development ===
A third-party race track "resource" in Multi Theft Auto

The initial "Deathmatch" version and its underlying engine presented a series of relevant changes to the functionality of the modification as well as the introduction of an online community content delivery system. Through the use of this website, registered users (such as players, server administrators or developers) can accumulate in-game statistics whilst playing on servers or share custom created content with other users.

Third party content is made possible through the addition of the Lua scripting language in both the server hosting the game (e.g. providing functionality for a specific game mode), as well as the client playing the game (e.g. providing a graphical front end or user-specific local content to the game mode). Different scripts can then be run in parallel on either of these, communicating to each other through the use of events.

The custom created content is grouped into "resources" that are hosted server-side. This is a package-based system that packs all script files, custom content (e.g. images, 3D models, textures and collision files) and metadata files inside a single archive or directory. Specific content can then be marked to be uploaded to every connected player, to enable client-side execution of Lua code. This system allows for package dependency and inheritance of functions between different packages, easy management and distribution.

=== Feature summary ===
A third-party minigame "resource" that transforms the game into a poker match

- Multi Theft Auto uses a modular platform to separate several facilities such as the GUI, network, game and scripting code and loads these into the game instead of injecting code into its memory process. This improves stability, speed and allows a better file management.
- Uses the freeware CEGUI system, replacing the original Grand Theft Auto GUI, allowing Multi Theft Auto to draw its own widgets for any in-game user interaction such as the server-browser and allows scripting from any third-party resource.
- A versatile set of scripting functions. By building upon Grand Theft Auto's own class-based design, implementing this into the client and server and synchronizing between these two, a third-party developer can control almost any aspect of every player's game by means of the Lua scripting language: native elements such as animations, explosions, particles, skins, weapons, vehicles, objects and players, as well as new elements such as custom 3D models are controllable.

== Gameplay ==
Deathmatch, roleplay and race gameplay options are available. Some gameplay elements include checkpoints, spawn points, power-ups, weapons and various objects ranging from ramps to exploding barrels. Many online servers contain custom game modes which use the scripting engine supplied with Multi Theft Auto. As example a few game modes in MTA:SA like Freeroam, where players can roam free in San Andreas all across the map, or competitive game-modes like Race, Destruction/Demolition Derby, Team Deathmatch, and Fallout, where players spawn their characters in the air, on a platform of glass plates, which will suddenly fall down after indicating it, where the players have to jump from a falling piece to an intact one, and the last surviving player wins. The principle of Fallout is similar to Hay, where players have to climb and be on top of a haystack first. The last modes also indicates how many game modes and scripts are possible to create on the MTA scripting engine, with endless possibilities and variation.

There are many genres of specific game servers and communities, like real-life role-playing, classic RPGs, and gaming communities that serve a wide variation of different gamemodes, sometimes all together in one server. Today, the average amount of game servers the San Andreas version of Multi Theft Auto (MTA:SA) contains, is 3,000 to 4,000 servers, with over 600,000 players monthly, spread over the servers. The most popular game servers have a constant average of 200 to 1,000 online players in-game.

== Reception ==
The Multi Theft Auto project has also been the subject in multiple articles in different media. The most prominent being a coverage on G4 TV, an exclusive release for Fileplanet with coverage on its frontpage, and features in published magazines such as PC Gamer and Total PC Gaming.
