= Grand Theft Auto III =

2001 video game

- North American cover art
- Developer: DMA Design (Note: All releases other than the original PlayStation 2 version were released under the studio's new name, Rockstar North. Ported to Xbox by Rockstar Vienna. 10 Year Anniversary Edition developed by War Drum Studios.)
- Publisher: Rockstar Games
- Producer: Leslie Benzies
- Programmers: Obbe Vermeij; Adam Fowler
- Artist: Aaron Garbut
- Writers: James Worrall; Paul Kurowski; Dan Houser
- Composers: Craig Conner; Stuart Ross
- Series: Grand Theft Auto
- Engine: RenderWare
- Platforms: PlayStation 2: Windows; Xbox; Mac OS X; Android; iOS; Fire OS
- Release: 23 October 2001: PlayStation 2; NA: 23 October 2001; PAL: 26 October 2001; Windows; NA: 21 May 2002; PAL: 24 May 2002; Xbox; NA: 4 November 2003; PAL: 2 January 2004; Mac OS X; WW: 12 November 2010; Android, iOS; WW: 15 December 2011; Fire OS; WW: 15 May 2014
- Genre: Action-adventure
- Mode: Single-player

Grand Theft Auto III is a 2001 action-adventure game developed by DMA Design and published by Rockstar Games. It is the first 3D game in the Grand Theft Auto series. Set in Liberty City, loosely based on New York City, the game follows Claude, a silent protagonist who becomes entangled in a world of crime, drugs, gang warfare, and corruption while pursuing revenge against his ex-girlfriend Catalina. The game is played from a third-person perspective and its world is navigated on foot or by vehicle. Its open world design lets the player freely roam Liberty City, which consists of three islands.

The core 23-person team at DMA Design, based in Edinburgh, worked closely with Rockstar Games in New York City. Development involved transforming popular Grand Theft Auto elements into a fully 3D world for the first time. The game was delayed following the 11 September attacks to allow the team to change references and gameplay deemed inappropriate. Grand Theft Auto III was released in October 2001 for the PlayStation 2, in May 2002 for Windows, and in November 2003 for the Xbox. Mobile ports were released for the tenth anniversary in 2011, followed by a remastered version for the twentieth in 2021.

Grand Theft Auto III received acclaim for its concept, gameplay, sound design, and visual fidelity, but generated controversies for its violent and sexual content. It received year-end accolades from several gaming publications, and it is considered a landmark game in the open world concept, one of the most significant games of the sixth generation of consoles, and among the best video games ever made. It was the best-selling video game of 2001, and among the best-selling PlayStation 2 games with over 11.6 million copies sold; it has sold over 14.5 million copies overall. The game was followed by Grand Theft Auto: Vice City (2002) and two prequels, Advance (2004) and Liberty City Stories (2005).

== Gameplay ==
The player can freely roam the game's world and use weapons to accomplish tasks.

Grand Theft Auto III is an action-adventure game played from a third-person perspective. The player completes missions—linear scenarios with set objectives—to progress through the story. It is possible to have several missions available to select from at a time, as some missions require the player to wait for further instructions or events. Outside of missions, the player can freely roam the open world and complete optional side missions. They begin in the borough of Portland, and as they progress through the storyline, they unlock Staunton Island and Shoreside Vale.

The player may run, jump, or use vehicles to navigate the game world. In combat, auto-aim can be used as assistance against enemies. Should the player take damage, they can regenerate their health meter with health pick-ups. Body armour can be used to absorb gunshots and explosive damage, but is depleted in the process. When health is completely depleted, gameplay stops and the player respawns at the nearest hospital, at the expense of losing armour, weapons, and an amount of money.

If the player commits crimes, law enforcement agencies may respond as indicated by a "wanted" meter in the head-up display (HUD). On the meter, the displayed stars indicate the current wanted level; for example, at the maximum six-star level, efforts by law enforcement to incapacitate the player become very aggressive. Law enforcement officers will search for the player as they leave the wanted vicinity. The wanted meter enters a cooldown mode and eventually recedes when the player is hidden from the officers' line of sight.

The player controls the mute criminal Claude. Throughout the story, Claude meets various characters from the criminal underworld. As the player completes missions for different gangs and criminal organisations, fellow gang members will often defend them, while rival gang members will recognise them and shoot on sight. While free roaming the world, the player may engage in activities such as a vigilante minigame, a firefighting activity, a paramedic service and a taxi service. Completion of these activities grants context-specific rewards to the player; for example, completing the vigilante mission allows them to bribe police after committing a crime, reducing the wanted level by one star per bribe.

Combat in Grand Theft Auto III was reworked to allow the player to perform drive-by shootings by viewing sideways in a car.

The player can use melee attacks, firearms and explosives to fight enemies. The firearms include weapons such as the Micro Uzi, an M16 rifle and a flamethrower. The three-dimensional environment allows a first-person view while aiming with the sniper rifle, rocket launcher and the M16 rifle. In addition, combat was reworked to allow the player to commit drive-by shootings by facing sideways in a vehicle. The player is given a wide variety of weapon options—they can be purchased from local firearms dealers, found on the ground, retrieved from dead enemies, or found scattered around the city.

== Plot ==
Small-time criminal Claude is betrayed and shot by his girlfriend Catalina (voiced by Cynthia Farrell) during a bank heist in Liberty City. Claude survives, but is arrested and convicted; en route to prison, his transport is attacked by members of the Colombian Cartel, who abduct another prisoner. Claude escapes with a fellow convict, explosives expert 8-Ball (Guru), who introduces him to the Leone Mafia family. Claude begins working for the Mafia, running various errands and eventually helping them win a gang war against the local Triads, which earns him the respect of Don Salvatore Leone (Frank Vincent). After learning the Cartel are creating and selling a new street drug called SPANK to fund their expansion into Liberty City, Salvatore orders Claude to destroy their floating drug lab, which he accomplishes with 8-Ball's help.

Salvatore later instructs Claude to dispose of a car, but his trophy wife Maria (Debi Mazar), who has taken a liking to Claude, reveals it to be a set-up. Maria claims she told Salvatore that she was having an affair with Claude to make him jealous, leading Salvatore to rig the car with explosives. Claude escapes to Staunton Island with Maria and her friend Asuka Kasen (Lianna Pai), the co-leader of the yakuza. After killing Salvatore to cut ties with the Mafia, Claude begins working for the yakuza. During this time, he also provides assistance to corrupt police inspector Ray Machowski (Robert Loggia), whom he eventually helps flee the city, and influential businessman Donald Love (Kyle MacLachlan), who hires him to rescue the convict abducted by the Cartel earlier. Love later sends Claude to kill Asuka's brother Kenji (Les J.N. Mau) under the guise of a Cartel attack to start a gang war between the Yakuza and the Cartel, which will lower real estate prices.

While retrieving a package from the Cartel on Love's behalf, Claude encounters Catalina, now the leader of the Cartel, at a construction site; she escapes after betraying and shooting her partner, Miguel (Al Espinosa). Asuka, blaming the Cartel for Kenji's death, seizes the construction site and captures the wounded Miguel, torturing him for information on Cartel operations. After Claude sabotages the Cartel's SPANK distribution network, Catalina kills Asuka and Miguel in retaliation and kidnaps Maria, demanding $500,000 for her release. During this time, Claude continues to work for Love, until he, the convict, and the package all mysteriously disappear. After raising the ransom money, Claude meets with Catalina to rescue Maria, but Catalina double-crosses him and flees with the money, leaving Claude trapped within the Cartel's stronghold. He escapes, frees Maria, and shoots down Catalina's getaway helicopter, killing her. As Claude and Maria leave the scene, Maria begins to complain about the kidnapping before her rant is abruptly silenced by a gunshot. (Note: The sound of a gunshot, and the silencing of Maria's voice, has led to speculation that Claude fired the shot to kill Maria or just to silence her; Rockstar said they are unsure which interpretation is correct.)

== Development ==
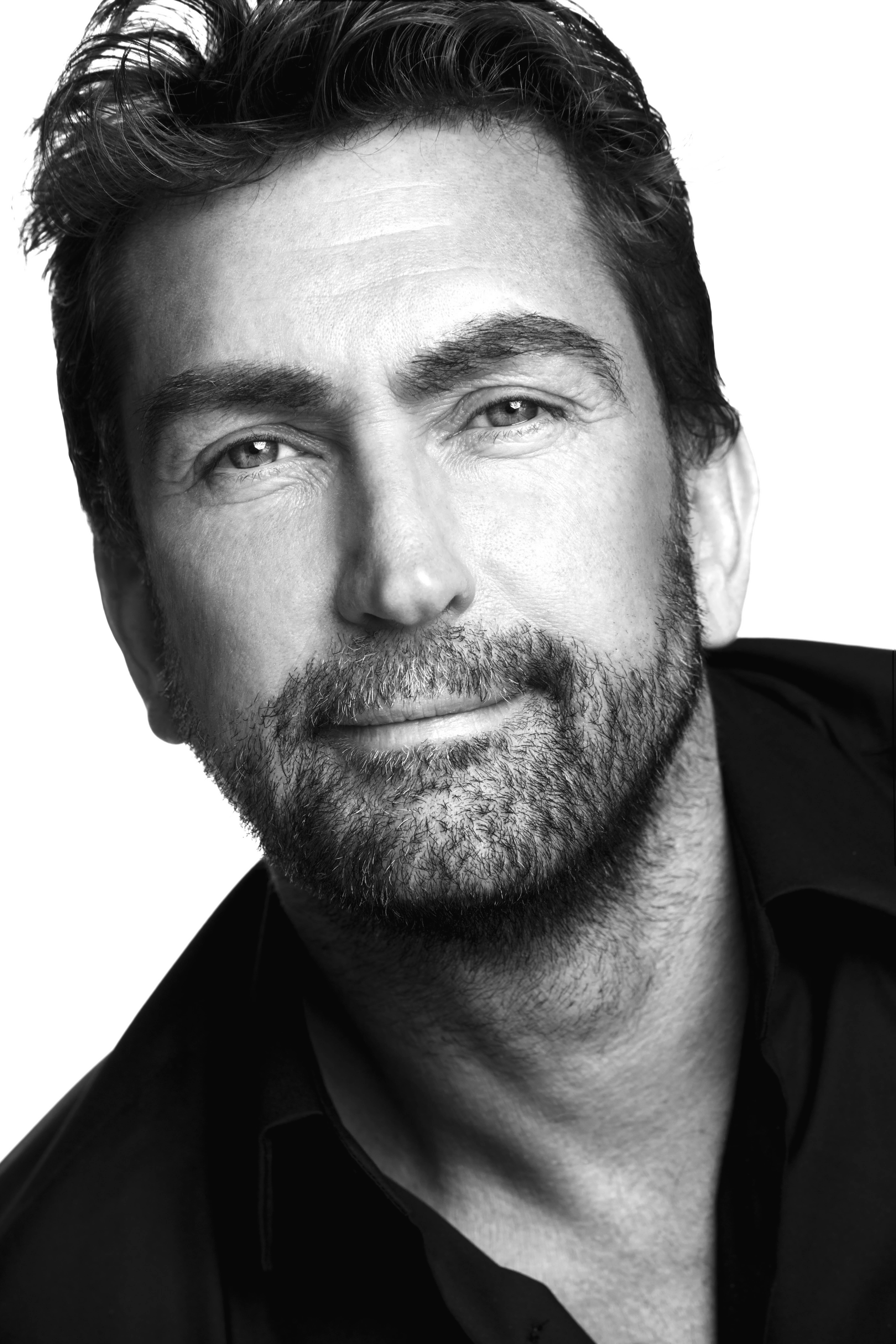
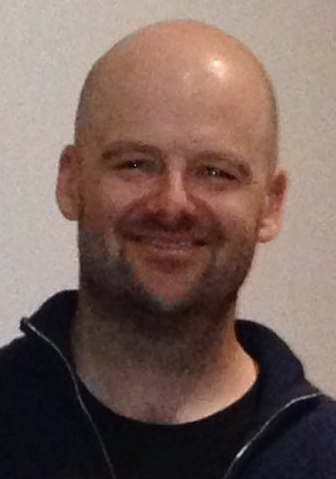
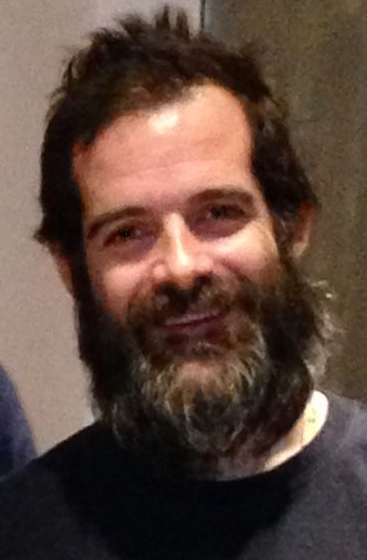
Leslie Benzies (left) produced the game alongside Dan Houser (centre), who also co-wrote the story. Sam Houser (right), president of Rockstar Games, executive-produced the game.

The core development team of Grand Theft Auto III consisted of about 23 people at DMA Design in Edinburgh, who worked closely with publisher Rockstar Games in New York City. The original tech demo was created on Sega's Dreamcast around the end of Grand Theft Auto 2's development in 1999. Rockstar had been pressuring its teams to create a 3D open world, and the DMA group behind Space Station Silicon Valley (1998) began working on a project separate from the Grand Theft Auto 2 team. Alan Jack, a DMA support engineer, described it as combining Body Harvest's (1998) exploration with Space Station Silicon Valley's city level.

The team decided against using the Grand Theft Auto branding to avoid conflict with the Grand Theft Auto 2 team and began developing their game as a Godzilla project. After Take-Two Interactive acquired DMA from Infogrames in September 1999, the Space Station Silicon Valley and Grand Theft Auto 2 teams were combined. The combined team initially began developing Grand Theft Auto III for the Dreamcast but shifted to the PlayStation 2 after four months. Technical director Obbe Vermeij said the shift was not due to hardware constraints, but because it became clear the Dreamcast was not commercially viable. He described the decision as disappointing, noting the DMA Design staff were big fans of Phantasy Star Online (2000).

During the Dreamcast phase, DMA Design developed city blocks with brownstones, docks, and retail areas, alongside vehicles and pedestrians. By early 2001, the team had designed the city, cars and some weapons. Producer Leslie Benzies described Grand Theft Auto III as a "crime simulation game". Rockstar offered Grand Theft Auto III to Microsoft Game Studios as an Xbox exclusive, but Microsoft declined due to its adult nature and the poor sales of its predecessors. The game was released for the PlayStation 2 on 23 October 2001 in North America. The team delayed the Windows version until after the PlayStation 2 release to ensure it was a high quality port, citing issues with the simultaneous platform release of previous Grand Theft Auto games. Zoo Corporation published the English version of the game in Japan for Windows on 28 June 2002; after the publishing deal expired, Capcom published a Japanese-language version for the PlayStation 2 and Windows on 25 September 2003.

=== Design ===
Grand Theft Auto III is the first 3D game in the series, using Criterion Games's game engine, RenderWare. Executive producer Sam Houser had always wanted the series to move to 3D, and DMA Design had experimented with 3D worlds in games like Body Harvest and Space Station Silicon Valley. With the release of the PlayStation 2 in 2000, the team believed a large 3D world was finally possible. Art director Aaron Garbut felt other video games at the time "were a thing you played", whereas he wanted Grand Theft Auto III to be "a place you lived in". A planned online multiplayer mode was dropped due to time and resource limitations.

Grand Theft Auto III is the first game in the series to use a third-person perspective view, positioning the camera closer to the player character.

The development team expanded upon concepts introduced in the previous Grand Theft Auto games. Benzies said the intent was to recreate the "freedom and diversity" of the previous games in a "living, breathing 3D world", using the power of the PlayStation 2. The console's support for DVDs, an upgrade from the PlayStation's compact disc format, gave the developers more storage space for animations, music and environments. Despite this, the team felt constrained by the PlayStation 2's 32 megabytes of RAM, due to the scale of the game. Its size also created difficulties for the testers, due to the variety of scenarios they needed to validate. Benzies believed that creating a living city was the "underlying principle" of the game's concept during development. Sam Houser felt the 3D element allowed the "chemistry of the team [to come] together perfectly for the first time".

The developers encountered difficulty with integrating all facets of the game into a fully 3D world, such as the sounds and radio stations, as well as designing and voicing the large number of non-player characters present in the open world. Producer Dan Houser said there were about 8,000 lines of recorded dialogue, while audio programmer Raymond Usher estimated about 18,000. The developers had the basic technical elements working together by mid-2000, with a prototype of the carjacking mechanic and a stable streaming model. Streaming was initially intended only for loading music and the map geometry, but its scope expanded to include other elements when the team realised there was more game data to process.

For the design of the game world, the developers initially created a "hybrid city", which Dan Houser described as "a post industrial Midwest slash east coast generic" city. Once the team began developing within this world, they realised that basing the design on a real location meant "you have a lot of things you can say about it". As a result, they redesigned Liberty City, which had been previously featured in the first Grand Theft Auto (1997), to be loosely based on New York City. DMA Design worked with a team at Rockstar in New York for cultural references; the Rockstar team regularly worked long hours for entire weeks to ensure the references, such as in-game car manufacturers, were appropriate to the city.

The city is broken into three islands: an industrial section representing Brooklyn and Queens, a commercial centre resembling Manhattan, and suburbs similar to New Jersey. The islands unlock as the story progresses; the team wanted the player to "start out feeling poor and work to being richer". Dan Houser described Liberty City as a "hybrid of a generic American city", including Chicago, Pittsburgh, Detroit, New York, and Philadelphia. He felt the parallel realism of the world allowed the team to make more social commentary. Sam Houser cited films and shows like Heat (1995) and The Sopranos (1999–2007) as inspiration for the setting and wanted to emulate them in the game. He also cited the influence of the Legend of Zelda franchise, the video game Super Mario 64 (1996), and the film Goodfellas (1990), describing Grand Theft Auto III as "a cross between a gangster movie and an RPG".

=== Story and characters ===
The team developed the story and game design simultaneously. Dan Houser said, "we use the story to expose the mechanics, and we use the mechanics to tell the story". However, he found it difficult to create the narrative, as the game is focused on giving the player freedom of choice. He wanted the story to be more nuanced and interesting than the generic "rise and fall and rise again of a superhero bad guy". The script was focused on mission objectives, attempting to implement high amounts of interactivity. Dan Houser felt each mission was "its own short story" and part of an "overarching story". He and co-writer James Worrall drew influence from films like The Warriors, Taxi Driver, Scarface, and Payback, and the depiction of mafiosos featured in Martin Scorsese's films. When writing the story, Dan Houser and Worrall regularly met with the designers, filling a room with post-it notes to construct the plot to shape the game.

Many characters were animated using motion capture, which was filmed at a rented studio at the Brooklyn Navy Yard, though this was limited by technical constraints. The character movement was also treated as being cinematic, though limited polygons heavily inhibited this. Animating non-player characters entering and driving cars proved to be difficult for the team, due to the variety of vehicle designs. "It involved chaining together dozens of different animations and altering key frames in code", recalled software engineer Alan Campbell. The team used varying camera angles when animating cutscenes to evoke different emotions. For the voice acting, the team wanted "natural, subtle performances", which proved difficult as many of the actors "had in their head the idea that because video games are animated, their performances needed to be animated", according to motion capture director Navid Khonsari.

Claude is unnamed in Grand Theft Auto III, and his name is not officially revealed until his appearance in Grand Theft Auto: San Andreas (2004). He is a silent protagonist, never speaking throughout his appearances in the series. The team made the decision primarily because it "did not seem like a major issue" compared to other challenges they faced during development, and also partly to help the player identify with the character and make him whoever they wanted him to be. The developers did not have "any one single inspiration" for Claude; they liked the idea of a "strong, silent killer, who would be juxtaposed with all of these neurotic and verbose mobsters".

=== Sound and radio design ===
Grand Theft Auto III features about three and a half hours of in-game radio material. The team sought a broad diversity of music to give the player the ability to hop between stations like in real life, reflecting the gangster movie culture invoked by the game. The team used the talk radio stations to add character to the city and provide a "unique take on American life"; Sam Houser described it as "a very iconoclastic look at America". The team cast real DJs for the in-game stations and wrote unusual dialogue for them, seeking the effect of "high production values and absurd content". Music director Craig Conner assembled the assets of the radio station—music, advertisements, DJ dialogue, and station imaging.

Chatterbox FM, one of the game's radio stations, is entirely talk radio hosted by Lazlow Jones, who met Rockstar's managing director Terry Donovan in 2001 as they were both preparing to travel to Los Angeles for E3. Donovan invited Jones to Rockstar's offices in Manhattan, where he met the development team, including Dan and Sam Houser and producer Jamie King, and they invited him to work on the game. The writing sessions took place at Dan Houser's apartment, and the entire process, including editing and recording, took around four to five months. With the station's guests and callers, the writers wanted to satirise American lifestyles, and they focused on creating fictional stories rather than basing them on news stories of the time that would quickly become outdated. Jones found the conversations to be natural, having worked in radio for several years. The roles of the guests were portrayed by Jones's friends and neighbours, including his father, and were recorded in New York.

=== Cuts and changes ===
Changes to the game after the 11 September attacks included the police cars' colour schemes to avoid resembling the NYPD (left), and the original cover art (right), which was still used for its European release.

[We] felt that a full content review of all our titles and the marketing materials we use to represent them was absolutely necessary for us ... we have come across certain small contextual references that we were no longer comfortable with, as well as a couple of very rare gameplay instances that no longer felt appropriate to us.

— Terry Donovan, Rockstar managing director

Several modifications were made to the game prior to its release, many of which were attributed to the 11 September attacks in New York City and around Washington, D.C. On 19 September 2001, Rockstar delayed the release by three weeks, citing the attacks as an influencing factor: Paul Eibeler, then president of Take-Two Interactive, said "Everyone had someone who had an uncle or brother" who was impacted by the attack.

One of the changes made after the attacks was the colour scheme of the police cars. Originally blue with white stripes, resembling the livery of the New York City Police Department, it was changed to a black-and-white design common among several police departments in the United States. Other changes included altering the flight path of a plane to avoid appearing to fly into or behind a skyscraper and removing a mission referencing terrorists, as well as some changes to pedestrian dialogue and talk radio. Another cut was the character of Darkel, a revolutionary urchin who vowed to bring down the city's economy. When references to Darkel were found in the code, speculation arose that he was related to 9/11, but Dan Houser explained the character had been cut "months before [release]". There were reports and previews stating the game featured schoolchildren as pedestrians prior to release, although Rockstar dismissed such rumours as "nonsense".

Rockstar said the game was "about 1% different" after 9/11, and the biggest change was the cover art. They felt the original cover, which was still used for its release in Europe, was "too raw" after 9/11, and it was changed to what became the "signature style" of the series. Sam Houser said the cover was designed in an evening and was instantly preferred over the original cover. The cover was inspired by the movie posters for 1960s films, such as The Thomas Crown Affair (1968).

== Reception ==
=== Critical response ===
PlayStation 2 version reception

Aggregate score
Aggregator	Score
Metacritic	97/100

Review scores
Publication	Score
1Up.com	A+
AllGame	5/5
Edge	8/10
Eurogamer	10/10
Game Informer	9.5/10
GamePro	5/5
GameRevolution	A
GameSpot	9.6/10
GameSpy	94/100
IGN	9.6/10

Grand Theft Auto III was released to critical acclaim. Metacritic calculated an average score of 97 out of 100, indicating "universal acclaim", based on 56 reviews. It is tied with Tony Hawk's Pro Skater 3 as the highest-rated PlayStation 2 game on the site and tied with a number of others as the sixth-highest-rated game overall. Reviewers liked the sound, gameplay, and open world design, though some criticism was directed at the controls. Tom Bramwell of Eurogamer called Grand Theft Auto III "a luscious, sprawling epic", and Official PlayStation Magazine named it "the most innovative, outlandish, brilliant video game". GameSpot's Jeff Gerstmann described the game as "an incredible experience that shouldn't be missed by anyone"; IGN's Doug Perry named it "one of the best titles of the year, on PlayStation 2, or on any system".

Many reviewers found the 3D graphics a welcome change from the 2D of the previous games. GameSpot's Gerstmann particularly praised the character and vehicle models, and the overall texture quality of the city. GameSpy's Andrei Alupului found the graphics "really rather impressive", describing the car models as "greatly improved" over those in Midnight Club. Eurogamer's Bramwell considered the graphics "generally pleasant to look at", but considered it inferior to games like Gran Turismo 3 and Ico. Justin Leeper of Game Informer described the game world as "stunning in scope and detail", and Perry of IGN found it to be "on a scale that's truly epic". Game Revolution's Ben Silverman called the city a "technological marvel ... that captures the essence of gritty city life in amazing detail".

IGN's Perry considered the sound "unbelievably and meticulously delivered", particularly praising the soundtrack, voice acting and sound design, stating it was "really approached as if it were done for a movie". Eurogamer's Bramwell echoed those sentiments, describing the city sounds as "perfect" and the soundtrack as "monstrous". The sound was described as "terrific" by GameSpot's Gerstmann and Game Revolution's Silverman, and 1UP.com appreciated the subtlety of the in-game radio stations. AllGame's Scott Alan Marriott named the music "the true star".

Reviewers considered the style of the missions to be a welcoming departure from those in previous games. 1UP.com described the missions as "wonderfully creative", while GamesMaster appreciated the diversity. IGN's Perry similarly appreciated the variety and scale of the missions, and praised the amount of available side missions. GameSpy's Alupului described the story as "well-paced" and "coherent", featuring plot elements akin to a mob film. GameSpot's Gerstmann found the missions entertaining and challenging, but noted exploring the world also offers "a great deal of fun".

Reactions to controls were mixed. Alupului of GameSpy found the game "controls beautifully", both while driving and on-foot. Game Revolution's Silverman identified the control issues as the game's only flaw, although he praised the responsiveness of the driving mechanics. Matt Helgeson of Game Informer similarly described the driving as "great", but noted "clunky" combat. GamePro's Four-Eyed Dragon found the cars simple to manoeuvre. Edge described the combat as "an awkward system that stymies play". 1UP.com noted particular flaws in the targeting system, explaining it "often focuses on the wrong guy".

==== Windows version ====
Windows version reception

Aggregate score
Aggregator	Score
Metacritic	93/100

Review scores
Publication	Score
Game Informer	9.5/10
GameSpot	9.3/10
GameSpy	94/100
IGN	9.4/10
PC Gamer (US)	92%
X-Play	4/5

When Grand Theft Auto III was released for Windows in May 2002, it received similar acclaim. Metacritic calculated an average score of 93 out of 100, indicating "universal acclaim", based on 20 reviews; it is the highest-rated 2002 Windows game on Metacritic. Reviewers liked the visual enhancements and control improvements, but criticised the port for its demanding system requirements.

The in-game features and controls in the port were generally well received. IGN's Tal Blevins praised the higher precision of the mouse controls, finding the aiming mechanic more precise. GameSpot's Erik Wolpaw also commended the mouse controls, but disapproved the replay system, particularly due to the lack of options with timing and camera controls. Extended Play's Andrew Bub appreciated the addition of a custom radio station, as well as the availability of custom skins. Daniel Morris of PC Gamer praised the gameplay tweaks provided by the port but criticised the lack of major additional features, such as an overhead map of the in-game city.

The port's visuals received a positive response from reviewers. GameSpot's Wolpaw praised the port's reworked textures but criticised the frequent popup and the advanced system requirements. IGN's Blevins similarly criticised the necessity of an advanced system for stable play, but ultimately felt the port looks "a bit nicer" than the original game. GameSpy's Sal Accardo felt the port "looks much sharper" than the PlayStation 2 version, though noted some "choppy" animations. Extended Play's Bub mentioned the advanced settings resulted in slowdown and crashes. Game Informer's Matt Helgeson noticed little difference between the visuals of the original and the port.

==== Mobile version ====
Mobile version reception

Aggregate score
Aggregator	Score
Metacritic	80/100

Review scores
Publication	Score
Destructoid	7/10
Eurogamer	5/10
GameSpot	7/10
IGN	7.5/10
Pocket Gamer	9/10

When Grand Theft Auto III was released to mobile devices in December 2011, it received generally positive reviews. Metacritic calculated an average score of 80 out of 100, based on 26 reviews. Reviewers liked the enhanced visuals, but criticism was directed at the touchscreen controls.

IGN's Peter Eykemans commended the port's smoother textures, especially condensed on a mobile screen, while Destructoid's James Stephanie Sterling noted improvements in the character and vehicle models. Mark Walton of GameSpot wrote the game runs well on high-end devices like the Motorola Xoom and Samsung Galaxy S II, but noticed significant frame rate and texture issues on the Xperia Play. Pocket Gamer's Mark Brown identified the short draw distance leading to sudden popup, although still found the models and textures "have been given a tune-up" in the port.

The touchscreen controls received a mixed response. Eurogamer's Dan Whitehead appreciated the driving mechanics, but felt moving on-foot is "a flaky way of navigating" the world, and criticised the "clumsy" shooting mechanics as most of the guns cannot be manually targeted. IGN's Eykemans felt the controls "make half the experience frustrating", and Destructoid's Sterling described them as "by far the biggest barrier toward enjoying" the port. Brown of Pocket Gamer found the touchscreen "hasn't hindered [the game] too drastically", commending simple movement and "effortless" driving mechanics. Some critics identified better controls upon the use of external gamepads, but felt they hinder the game's portability.

=== Accolades ===
Grand Theft Auto III received multiple nominations and awards from gaming publications. It was awarded Game of the Year at the 2nd Game Developers Choice Awards, and from GameSpot and GameSpy. It was named the Best PlayStation 2 Game by Game Revolution, GameSpot, GameSpy, and IGN. It also won Best Action Game from Game Revolution, GameSpot, and IGN; Most Innovative from GameSpot; and Excellence in Game Design at the Game Developers Choice Awards. GameSpy also awarded the game Most Offensive, Best Use of Radio, and tied for Best Artificial Intelligence. At the 5th Annual Interactive Achievement Awards, Grand Theft Auto III won Outstanding Achievement in Game Design and Outstanding Achievement in Game Play Engineering, and was nominated for Console Action/Adventure Game of the Year. The following year at the 6th Annual Interactive Achievement Awards, the Windows version won Computer Action/Adventure Game of the Year and was nominated for Outstanding Innovation in Computer Gaming. The game was among ten honourees of the Award for Excellence at the 8th CESA Game Awards in 2004.

== Sales ==
In the United States, Grand Theft Auto III was the highest-selling game of 2001, selling over 1.4 million units by December and two million by February 2002. Take-Two stock significantly increased, and the game was included in PlayStation's Greatest Hits selection. Within a year, the game had sold six million copies and generated over US$250 million in revenue; by January 2003, it had sold seven million and generated over US$350 million. It was the second-best-selling game of 2002, behind only its sequel, Grand Theft Auto: Vice City. In the United States, the game had sold 5.35 million units by June 2004, and 6.55 million units by December 2007. The Windows version accounted for 420,000 sales and $16.9 million in earnings by August 2006 in the United States, where it was the 34th-best-selling computer game in the preceding 6.5 years.

European sales of Grand Theft Auto III rivalled its American figures by December 2001. It was the first game to receive a "Diamond" award in the United Kingdom, indicating over one million sales. In Italy, the game sold 75,000 copies in its first three months, more than fivefold its distributor's expectations. In Japan, it sold around 75,000 copies in its first day, 120,000 in its first week, roughly 300,000 by December 2003, and more than 350,000 by January 2008. Grand Theft Auto: Double Pack—a bundle containing Grand Theft Auto III and Vice City—became one of the best-selling Xbox games with over 1.59 million copies sold in the United States and over 1.25 million in Japan. The game became one of the best-selling PlayStation 2 games with 11.6 million copies sold, and sold 14.5 million units overall by March 2008.

== Controversies ==
Grand Theft Auto III generated several controversies. GameSpy awarded it "Most Offensive Game of the Year"; calling it "absolutely reprehensible", they wrote the game rewards the player for "causing mayhem" and "killing innocent people by the dozen", questioning its appropriateness. The notoriety led American retailer Wal-Mart to check identification of purchasers who appeared under the age of 17 when purchasing mature games. Shira Chess identified the lack of consequence to player violence due to the ability to respawn upon death or incarceration, and found it denies the "reality of mortality and simultaneously [forces] it on players". Benzies claimed the violence was intended as comedic and the game is "not meant to be taken seriously", and Dan Houser said the team was conscious of the offence it would attract but "never marketed it in a way that exploited that".

The game allows the player to participate in sexual activities with prostitutes and murder them to reclaim the payment, which was met with widespread controversy. The game also received some backlash for its depiction of crime and allowing violence against police officers. Psychologist David Walsh of the National Institute on Media and the Family said it "glamorizes antisocial and criminal activity", and "the purpose of the game is to perpetrate crime". In response, Kotaku writer Owen Good noted it does not reward the player for "proficiency at crime, no matter how much it is accused of doing so". The Boston Globe's Joanna Weiss noted the "adrenaline" felt when committing crimes in the game, excusing its violence due to its mature classification. In January 2002, the National Organization for Women called for Rockstar and Take-Two to withdraw the game from sale as it "encourages violence and the degradation of women". Matt Richtel of The New York Times wrote the activities within the game "crossed the line into bad taste".

Grand Theft Auto III was initially released in Australia with an MA15+ classification, but the Office of Film and Literature Classification (OFLC) later banned it after re-reviewing, citing its sexual content and violence against prostitutes. After Take-Two appealed, the OFLC reaffirmed its ban on 11 December 2001, having reanalysed the game alongside a forensic psychologist. Take-Two recalled the game in Australia and Rockstar made appropriate changes; a modified version was released with an MA15+ classification in January 2002, removing instances of sexual acts with prostitutes. The game was re-rated with an R18+ classification in September 2019, citing "sexual activities related to incentives and rewards". In Japan, it was designated "harmful" for children in Kanagawa Prefecture in June 2005, essentially removing it from open shelves; Capcom criticised the decision and considered legal action but did not pursue further, and the designation ultimately led to a sales increase.

On 25 June 2003, teenage stepbrothers William and Josh Buckner shot at motorists, killing Aaron Hamel and wounding Kimberly Bede. In statements to investigators, the perpetrators claimed their actions were inspired by Grand Theft Auto III. In response, on 20 October 2003, the families of Hamel and Bede filed a US$246 million lawsuit against Rockstar, Take-Two, Sony Computer Entertainment and Wal-Mart. Rockstar and Take-Two filed for dismissal of the lawsuit, stating in United States district court on 29 October 2003 that the "ideas and concepts", and the "purported psychological effects" of the perpetrators, are protected by the First Amendment's free-speech clause. Jack Thompson, the lawyer representing the victims, denied Rockstar's claims and attempted to move the lawsuit into a state court for consideration under Tennessee's consumer protection act.

== Legacy ==
Grand Theft Auto III has frequently been included among the greatest video games of all time. In 2007, GamePro called Grand Theft Auto III the most important video game of all time, explaining the "game's open-ended gameplay elements have revolutionized the way all video games are made". Similarly, IGN ranked the game among the "Top 10 Most Influential Games", and GameSpot listed it among the greatest games of all time. In 2009, Game Informer wrote that Grand Theft Auto III "changed the gaming landscape forever with its immersive open world sandbox", and in 2016, GamesRadar+ named it the "most important game" of the 2000s. Time named it one of the greatest video games of all time in November 2012 and August 2016. The game was selected as part of the Game On touring exhibition, demonstrating some of the development plans and artwork. In 2016, the Strong National Museum of Play inducted Grand Theft Auto III to its World Video Game Hall of Fame.

Grand Theft Auto III is considered to have a leading role in the popularisation of sandbox games, inspiring those such as Crackdown, Mafia, Saints Row, True Crime, and Watch Dogs. The term "Grand Theft Auto clone" is frequently used to describe subsequent video games released with similar open-ended gameplay as Grand Theft Auto III. While previous video games used open world design, including earlier Grand Theft Auto games, Grand Theft Auto III took this gameplay foundation and expanded it into a 3D world, offering an unprecedented variety of minigames and side-missions. Journalist and consultant Tom Bramwell felt the game did not invent a lot of its gameplay features, but "brought them all together". Due to its greater success over its predecessors, it is credited with popularising the open-world concept; Dan Houser felt it became "one of the most vibrant genres today", and Garbut felt it led to the complexities of Rockstar's future open world games, including the later Grand Theft Auto games and Red Dead Redemption 2 (2018). IGN's Jack Harwood thought the talk radio station inspired similar inclusions in other open world games, such as Mafia III (2016) and Watch Dogs: Legion (2020).

The game also led the trend of mature video games; Dan Houser felt it allowed other developers to create violent shooters. Hal Halpin, president of the Entertainment Consumers Association, described Grand Theft Auto III as the "lightning rod for the violence-in-games debate". Metro's Roger Hargreaves wrote it "emboldened a whole new wave of games that were ... fixated with violence [and] gang culture". Greg Ford of Electronic Gaming Monthly felt the game allowed the medium to handle mature subject matter in a more serious manner than previously perceived, and noted the improvement of video game classification as a result of its controversy. King said video games at the time were often associated with children or nerds, and the development team "wanted the rest of the entertainment industry to pay attention" and understand the medium could also contain mature, adult content.

Following the success, Rockstar developed further games in the series. Vice City and San Andreas are set in their titular locations in 1986 and 1992, respectively. Grand Theft Auto Advance (2004) is set in Liberty City roughly a year before the events of Grand Theft Auto III. Grand Theft Auto: Liberty City Stories (2005) takes place three years before the events of Grand Theft Auto III in the same rendition of Liberty City. A completely redesigned version of the city was later used in Grand Theft Auto IV (2008), The Lost and Damned (2009), The Ballad of Gay Tony (2009), and Chinatown Wars (2009).

=== Ports ===
Grand Theft Auto III was released on 21 May 2002 for Windows, supporting higher screen resolutions and draw distance, and featuring more detailed textures. Analysts believed it would eventually release on GameCube, though it never materialised. Grand Theft Auto III was bundled with Vice City in the compilation Grand Theft Auto: Double Pack, released on the Xbox on 4 November 2003 in North America and 2 January 2004 in Europe. The Xbox version featured a custom soundtrack support as well as improved audio, polygon models, and reflections over the previous ports. Double Pack was later bundled with San Andreas as part of Grand Theft Auto: The Trilogy, released in October 2005. The Trilogy was also released for OS X on 12 November 2010. On 15 December 2011, for the game's tenth anniversary, War Drum Studios ported it to iOS and Android; this port is almost identical to the Windows version, with the addition of enhanced models and textures and touchscreen controls. This port was also released on Fire OS on 15 May 2014. A PlayStation 3 version was released on 25 September 2012 via the PlayStation Network. The original PlayStation 2 version was released for the PlayStation 4 as a PS2 Classics game, on 5 December 2015. In 2012, a modding community under the name RAGE Classic Team ported the map over to Grand Theft Auto IV, named Grand Theft Auto III: RAGE Classic.

An enhanced version of The Trilogy, The Definitive Edition, including Grand Theft Auto III, was released for the Nintendo Switch, PlayStation 4, PlayStation 5, Windows, Xbox One, and Xbox Series X/S on 11 November 2021, to celebrate the game's twentieth anniversary, and for Android and iOS on 14 December 2023. Existing versions were removed from digital retailers in preparation for The Definitive Edition, but later restored as a bundle on the Rockstar Store.

A core team of six fans reverse-engineered the game and released it as an executable in April 2020, having worked on it since 2016. The project, re3, allows the game to be unofficially ported to platforms such as Nintendo Switch, PlayStation Vita, and Wii U. Take-Two issued a DMCA takedown for the project in February 2021, though it was restored in June after the team filed a counter-notice. In September 2021, Take-Two filed a lawsuit in California against the programmers, asserting the projects constitute copyright infringement. In July 2024, fan developer SKMP started creating a Dreamcast port, seen as a significant undertaking due to the console's limited memory; it was released in December.

== Literature ==
- Chess, Shira (2006). "Playing the Bad Guy: Grand Theft Auto in the Panopticon". In Garrelts, Nate (ed.). The Meaning and Culture of Grand Theft Auto. McFarland & Company. pp. 80–90. ISBN 978-0-7864-2822-9.
- Crookes, David (November 2013). "The Making of Grand Theft Auto III". Retro Gamer (122). United States: Imagine Publishing: 58–83.
- DMA Design (2001). Grand Theft Auto III Game Manual. Rockstar Games.
- Kushner, David (3 April 2012). Jacked: The Outlaw Story of Grand Theft Auto. Turner Publishing Company. ISBN 978-0-4709-3637-5.
- "The Top 200 Games of All Time". Game Informer. No. 200. December 2009. pp. 44–79. ISSN 1067-6392. OCLC 27315596.
