= Grand Theft Auto 2 =

1999 action-adventure game

- Developers: DMA Design; Tarantula Studios (GBC)
- Publisher: Rockstar Games
- Directors: Jim Woods; David Jones; Simon Crisp (GBC)
- Designers: Stephen Banks; William Mills; Billy Thomson
- Programmers: Keith R. Hamilton; Martin McKenzie (GBC)
- Artists: Ian McQue; Russell East (GBC)
- Writer: Dan Houser
- Composers: Colin Anderson; Craig Conner; Bert Reid; Stuart Ross; Paul Scargill; Anthony Paton (GBC)
- Series: Grand Theft Auto
- Platforms: PlayStation; Windows; Dreamcast; Game Boy Color
- Release: 22 October 1999: PlayStation, Windows; 22 October 1999; Dreamcast; NA: 1 May 2000; EU: 20 May 2000; Game Boy Color; December 2000
- Genre: Action-adventure
- Modes: Single-player, multiplayer

Grand Theft Auto 2 is a 1999 action-adventure game developed by DMA Design and published by Rockstar Games. It is the sequel to 1997's Grand Theft Auto, and the second main entry in the Grand Theft Auto series. Set within a retrofuturistic metropolis known as "Anywhere City", the game focuses on players taking the role of a criminal as they roam an open world, conducting jobs for various crime syndicates and having free rein to do whatever they wish to achieve their goal. The intro involves live-action scenes filmed by Rockstar Games. The game was released for the PlayStation and Windows in October 1999 and for the Dreamcast and Game Boy Color in 2000.

Grand Theft Auto 2 received mixed reviews for most platforms, and negative reviews for the Game Boy Color, but was a moderate commercial success. While the soundtrack and some gameplay elements, such as the gang loyalty system, were praised, the graphics, controls, and setting received a more mixed response. The game was also criticised for failing to innovate the formula established by its predecessor, despite several improvements it brought. Grand Theft Auto 2 was followed by 2001's Grand Theft Auto III, which started a new era for the series, while the game itself was re-released on Steam in January 2008.

== Gameplay ==
Grand Theft Auto 2 being played at "dusk" in the Windows version

Players begin a game with one character (six in the Game Boy Color version). Like its predecessor, the game focuses on players completing a series of levels, each requiring a set target score being achieved to progress to the next stage. Points are awarded from various criminal actions, such as destroying cars, selling vehicles, and completing missions for various crime syndicates, with the latter awarding more points than doing simple criminal actions. Creating chaos from their crimes will cause the player to be wanted by the police, who will hound the player to arrest or kill them, with higher wanted levels increasing the level of response used. Being arrested or dying loses the player any equipment they found, and impacts their multiplier bonus.

Grand Theft Auto 2's setting is unique for the series: a retrofuturistic metropolis referred to as "Anywhere, USA", which is divided into three districts (Downtown, Residential, and Industrial) that players will switch between as they progress through the game. The time period the game is set in is not specified—conflicting sources suggest anything from "three weeks into the future", to the year being 2013, despite in-game references to the "new millennium" that is coming (implying the game takes place around its time of release, in 1999).

The game introduced several features and improvements to the series. Players can save their game during a level playthrough by visiting the church where they start, but must pay a set number of points to do so. Jobs on offer come from three different syndicates—each level features two unique syndicates, alongside a third syndicate present in all levels. By doing jobs for a syndicate and completing them, the player gains respect with that syndicate, allowing them to take on tougher jobs with enough respect, but lose it with their chief rivals, locking them out of their jobs and making the syndicate's members hostile to the player. Other improvements include vehicles and pedestrians being more interactive with the game's environment—such as gang members engaging in fights with police—the presence of other criminals (such as muggers), a health meter, garages that can modify vehicles with special improvements, a selection of side missions ranging from running a taxi to driving a semi-truck, and groups of 'hidden' packages to find across the level.

== Development and release ==
Grand Theft Auto 2 was developed by DMA Design in Dundee under the lead programmer Keith Hamilton. The team initially considered calling the game Eh Stole E' Motur but later believed this name could hamper the game's international appeal.

Grand Theft Auto 2 was released for the PlayStation and Windows on 22 October 1999. It was released for the Dreamcast on 1 May 2000 in North America and 20 May in Europe. A Game Boy Color version, developed by Tarantula Studios, was released in December 2000.

== GTA 2 – The Movie ==
The game was developed with an eight-minute short film of live-action footage, filmed within New York City. The short film was devised as an introductory sequence for the game, and was made available on Rockstar Games's website. The film follows a criminal named Claude Speed (played by Scott Maslen), (Note: Not to be confused with Claude, the protagonist of Grand Theft Auto III) who conducts jobs around Anywhere City for several criminal syndicates, until his actions eventually catch up and he is killed by an assassin from one of the gangs he robbed. The film was based on a screenplay by Dan Houser, and directed by Alex De Rakoff.

== Soundtrack ==
The game features a dynamic soundtrack with five radio stations available in each area, selected from a total of eleven. Players can switch between stations while driving most vehicles, allowing for a personalized listening experience. The "Head Radio" station, a staple in the Grand Theft Auto series, also appears in this installment. Each gang in the game operates its own radio station, but these broadcasts are limited to specific areas. Emergency vehicles—such as police cars, ambulances, fire trucks, and tanks—do not play regular radio stations. Instead, players hear the emergency services' radio transmissions.

The game continues the series' tradition of featuring exclusive music and advertisements. The soundtrack was curated by a team including Craig Conner, Stuart Ross, Paul Scargill, Colin Anderson, Bert Reid, and Moving Shadow. The menu song, "Short Change", was produced by the British band E-Z Rollers. The Game Boy Color version includes a sped-up rendition of "Back in Black" by AC/DC. The Character Selection theme is based on the classic Brazilian song "Chega de Saudade".

== Reception ==
Reception

Aggregate scores
Aggregator	Score
GameRankings	71.50% (PC); 70.80% (DC); 69.92% (PS1); 35.00% (GBC)
Metacritic	70/100 (PS1)

Review scores
Publication	Score
Computer and Video Games	4/5 (PC)
Edge	8/10
GameSpot	6.9/10 (PS1); 6.9/10 (DC); 6.8/10 (PC)
IGN	7.3/10 (PC); 6.8/10 (PS1); 6.7/10 (DC)
Next Generation	2/5

More than 1.2 million copies of the game were shipped to retailers worldwide, expected to contribute over US$33 million in gross revenue. Grand Theft Auto 2's computer version received a "Silver" sales award from the Entertainment and Leisure Software Publishers Association (ELSPA), indicating sales of at least 100,000 copies in the United Kingdom. The game's PlayStation version received a "Platinum" sales award (300,000 or more units in the United Kingdom) from ELSPA. The game went on to sell about 2 million copies worldwide.

Grand Theft Auto 2 received mixed reviews. The graphics received mixed reactions from critics, who noted that they had barely any difference to the graphics in the original game. IGN's Tal Blevins called them "average at best", and that the scenery is "hard to appreciate". Jeff Gerstmann of GameSpot said that the "graphics look a bit plain". The game's soundtrack received positive feedback, with Gerstmann calling it a "great soundtrack", and that it "closely [mirrors] the station-style of the original game". IGN's Blevins called it "one of the best features".

Grand Theft Auto 2's gameplay elements received mixed reactions. IGN's Jeremy Dunham said that the gameplay is "where the game really takes a punch to the stomach", and that it "could've been a lot better". Tal Blevins called it "simple, but effective". Jeff Gerstmann said that "even though the gameplay is largely the same as in the previous GTA, it's still a lot of fun." Edge highlighted the game's story development and inventive missions, stating that Grand Theft Auto 2 "manages to draw you deep into the complexities of its world".

Blake Fischer reviewed the Dreamcast version of the game for Next Generation, rating it two stars out of five, and stated that it is a "great idea that, for one reason or another, never really gets into a must-play game".

The Game Boy Color version received negative reviews. Craig Harris of IGN wrote, "I appreciate the desire to try and move games from the higher platforms to the Game Boy Color, but jeez, Grand Theft Auto 2? The first one was bad enough. I will take this time to plead with Rockstar Games - just say no to GTA on GBA."

In 2026, Top Gear reviewed the game, describing it as an "aberration" and comparing Anywhere City as a "bizarre mix of Tim Burton's Gotham City and Blade Runner's neon lights, populated by Claymation criminals and Elvis impersonators". They highlighted its non-linear nature and praised the changes made from the original game.

== Bibliography ==
- Loguidice, Bill; Barton, Matt (2012). Vintage Games: An Insider Look at the History of Grand Theft Auto, Super Mario, and the Most Influential Games of All Time. Taylor & Francis. p. 161. ISBN 978-1136137570.
- Garrelts, Nate (2006). The Meaning and Culture of Grand Theft Auto. Jefferson, North Carolina, United States: McFarland. ISBN 9780786428229.
- Kushner, David (2012). Jacked: The Outlaw Story of Grand Theft Auto. Hoboken, New Jersey, United States: Wiley. ISBN 978-0470936375.
