= Nate Garrelts =

American academic

- Born: Nathan Garrelts
- Education: PhD, Michigan State University, American Studies
- Known for: Cultural Studies
- Notable work: Responding to Call of Duty (2017), Understanding Minecraft (2014), The Meaning and Culture of Grand Theft Auto (2006), Digital Gameplay (2005)

Nate Garrelts is an American academic who studies digital games and other media. He has edited four collections of essays on digital games: Digital Gameplay (McFarland, 2005), The Meaning and Culture of Grand Theft Auto (McFarland, 2006), Understanding Minecraft (McFarland, 2014), and Responding to Call of Duty (McFarland, 2017).The Meaning and Culture of Grand Theft Auto was the first academic collection to focus on a single game series. He has also contributed essays to the websites Bad Subjects and Berfrois. In 2003, he founded the Video Game Studies area at the Popular Culture Association/ American Culture Association National Conference in New Orleans and continued to coordinate it until 2007. This area, which has since been renamed Game Studies, is one of the longest continually run game studies events in the United States.

== Biography ==
Garrelts received his PhD in American Studies from Michigan State University (2003). His dissertation was titled The Official Strategy Guide for Video Game Studies: A Grammar and Rhetoric. He is currently Professor of English at Ferris State University.

== Published works ==
- Garrelts, Nate (2005). Digital Gameplay: Essays on the Nexus of Game and Gamer. Jefferson, North Carolina, United States: McFarland. ISBN 9780786422920.
- Garrelts, Nate (2006). The Meaning and Culture of Grand Theft Auto: Critical Essays. Jefferson, North Carolina, United States: McFarland. ISBN 9780786428229.
- Garrelts, Nate (2014). Understanding Minecraft: Essays on Play, Community and Possibilities. Jefferson, North Carolina, United States: McFarland. ISBN 9780786479740.
- Garrelts, Nate (2017). Responding to Call of Duty: Critical Essays on the Game Franchise. Jefferson, North Carolina, United States: McFarland. ISBN 9781476668758.
