= Jacked: The Outlaw Story of Grand Theft Auto =

2012 book by David Kushner

- Author: David Kushner
- Language: English
- Published: April 1, 2012
- Publisher: John Wiley & Sons
- Publication place: United States
- Pages: 309
- ISBN: 0470936371

Jacked: The Outlaw Story of Grand Theft Auto is a 2012 book by David Kushner that describes the history of Grand Theft Auto and its developer Rockstar Games, particularly two of its co-founders Sam Houser and Dan Houser. It describes some of the controversies that the game went through, such as the legal feud with conservative activist Jack Thompson, and its continual attempts to push up against societal limits, and the attempt to cover up the Hot Coffee mod in the release of GTA: San Andreas.

The book served as the basis for The Gamechangers, a 90-minute made-for-television film about the development and cultural impact of Grand Theft Auto produced by the BBC, and starring Daniel Radcliffe as Sam Houser and Bill Paxton as Jack Thompson. The film focuses primarily on the sociopolitical implications and government response to the "Hot Coffee" minigame. Rockstar sued the BBC for making the film without its consultation.

== Reception ==
The Washington Post says that "David Kushner tries to shed some light on the studio, but his success is limited by Rockstar’s reclusiveness." It also notes the "parallels between this disruptive company and the antiheroes depicted in its games."
