= Grand Theft Auto =

Video game series

- Logo since Grand Theft Auto III (2001)
- Genre: Action-adventure
- Developers: Rockstar North; Digital Eclipse; Rockstar Leeds; Rockstar Canada; Rockstar Games
- Publisher: Rockstar Games
- Creators: David Jones; Mike Dailly
- Platforms: Android; Dreamcast; Fire OS; Game Boy Advance; Game Boy Color; iOS; macOS; MS-DOS; Nintendo DS; Nintendo Switch; PlayStation; PlayStation 2; PlayStation 3; PlayStation 4; PlayStation 5; PlayStation Portable; Windows; Windows Phone; Xbox; Xbox 360; Xbox One; Xbox Series X/S
- First release: Grand Theft Auto; 28 November 1997
- Latest release: Grand Theft Auto VI; 19 November 2026

Grand Theft Auto (GTA) is an action-adventure video game series created by the Scottish programmers David Jones and Mike Dailly at DMA Design, now known as Rockstar North. Later titles were developed under the oversight of brothers Dan and Sam Houser, Leslie Benzies and Aaron Garbut. It is primarily developed by Rockstar North and published by its American parent company, Rockstar Games. The name of the series is a term for motor vehicle theft in the United States.

Gameplay focuses on an open world where the player can complete missions to progress an overall story, as well as engage in various side activities. Most of the gameplay revolves around driving and shooting, with occasional role-playing and stealth elements. The series also has elements of the earlier beat 'em up games from the 16-bit era. The games in the Grand Theft Auto series are set in fictional locales modelled after real-life cities, at various points in time from the early 1960s to the 2020s. The original game's map encompassed three cities—Liberty City (based on New York City), San Andreas (based on San Francisco), (Note: In later games, San Andreas is depicted as a state, mostly based on California and Nevada, while a new city based on San Francisco, San Fierro, is instead featured. Two additional cities, Los Santos (based on Los Angeles) and Las Venturas (based on Las Vegas) also exist in the state of San Andreas.) and Vice City (based on Miami)—but later titles tend to focus on a single setting and expand upon the original three locales. Each game in the series centres on different protagonists who attempt to rise through the criminal underworld due to various motives, often accompanying themes of betrayal. Several acting veterans have voiced characters in the games, including Ray Liotta, Dennis Hopper, Burt Reynolds, Samuel L. Jackson, William Fichtner, James Woods, and Peter Fonda; while other celebrities have also voiced characters or appeared as themselves, such as Debbie Harry, Lazlow Jones, Phil Collins, Axl Rose, Dr. Dre, and Anderson .Paak.

Dundee-based DMA Design began the series with 1997's Grand Theft Auto. As of 2026, the series consists of eight standalone titles and four expansion packs. The third main title, Grand Theft Auto III, released in 2001, is considered a landmark game, and brought the series into a three-dimensional environment for the first time. Subsequent titles have followed and built upon the format established by Grand Theft Auto III, receiving significant acclaim. The games influenced other open-world games, and led to the label Grand Theft Auto clone on similar titles.

Despite several controversies for its adult nature, violent themes and cut content, the series has been critically acclaimed; all main 3D entries in the franchise frequently rank among the greatest and best-selling video games. It has shipped almost 480 million units, placing it amongst both the best-selling video game franchises and highest-grossing media franchises of all time. The series is considered one of both Scotland and the United Kingdom's largest cultural exports; though most of the games are predominantly set in a fictionalised version of the United States, they contain numerous references to the developers' Scottish roots. (Note: Attributed to multiple references:) In 2006, Grand Theft Auto was featured in a list of British design icons in the Great British Design Quest, organised by the BBC and the Design Museum.

== Series history ==
=== Main series ===
Release timeline 2D universe 3D universe HD universe
1997	Grand Theft Auto
1998
1999	Grand Theft Auto: London 1969
1999	Grand Theft Auto: London 1961
1999	Grand Theft Auto 2
2000
2001	Grand Theft Auto III
2002	Grand Theft Auto: Vice City
2003
2004	Grand Theft Auto: San Andreas
2004	Grand Theft Auto Advance
2005	Grand Theft Auto: Liberty City Stories
2006	Grand Theft Auto: Vice City Stories
2007
2008	Grand Theft Auto IV
2009	Grand Theft Auto IV: The Lost and Damned
2009	Grand Theft Auto: Chinatown Wars
2009	Grand Theft Auto: The Ballad of Gay Tony
2010
2011
2012
2013	Grand Theft Auto V
2013	Grand Theft Auto Online
2014
2015
2016
2017
2018
2019
2020
2021
2022
2023
2024
2025
2026	Grand Theft Auto VI

The Grand Theft Auto series is split into separate fictional universes, named after the primary level of graphics capability used in each era. The original Grand Theft Auto, its expansions and its sequel are considered the "2D universe". Grand Theft Auto III and its sequels are considered the "3D universe". Grand Theft Auto IV, its expansions and its sequels are considered the "HD universe". Each universe is considered separate with only brands, place names and background characters shared between them.

Grand Theft Auto, the first game in the series, was released for MS-DOS and Windows in November 1997, ported to the PlayStation in 1998 and the Game Boy Color in 1999. Grand Theft Auto 2 was released in 1999 for Windows, later receiving ports on the PlayStation, Dreamcast and Game Boy Color. The PlayStation 2 featured three main Grand Theft Auto instalments released as timed exclusives under a deal between Take-Two Interactive and Sony Computer Entertainment, before being ported to Windows and Xbox. The 2001 title Grand Theft Auto III moved away from the two-dimension (2D) graphics used in the first two games to three-dimension (3D) computer graphics Grand Theft Auto: Vice City was published in 2002, and was the first to feature a speaking protagonist, voiced by Ray Liotta. Grand Theft Auto: San Andreas, released in 2004, introduced various new elements, including character customisation and a large map encompassing three cities and surrounding rural area.

Two main instalments were published for the PlayStation 3 and Xbox 360. The 2008 title Grand Theft Auto IV focused on realism and detail, removing various customisation features, while adding an online multiplayer mode. Grand Theft Auto V, published in 2013, featured three playable protagonists. It was released to massive financial success, breaking multiple records. It was later re-released with various enhancements, in 2014 for the PlayStation 4 and Xbox One, and in 2015 for Windows; versions for PlayStation 5 and Xbox Series X and S were released in 2022.

On 4 February 2022, Rockstar confirmed that development of a new entry in the series was "well underway". In-development footage of the game leaked in September 2022; Rockstar noted that it was "extremely disappointed" by the manner in which the game was first demonstrated, but that it did not anticipate long-term effects on development. In December 2023, the game was officially announced as Grand Theft Auto VI, with a projected release date of 2025 for the PlayStation 5 and Xbox Series X/S. After a couple of delays, the game released on 19 November 2026.

=== Other games ===
Grand Theft Auto has spawned numerous additional games and expansion packs. In 1999, the original game received two expansion packs: Grand Theft Auto: London 1969 and Grand Theft Auto: London 1961, which, as their names suggest, featured a different setting – a fictional version of London – and new missions and characters. Grand Theft Auto Advance, released in 2004 exclusively for the Game Boy Advance, featured a top-down perspective, similarly to the first two main games in the series, and the same setting as Grand Theft Auto III, to which it served as a prequel. Three games were released for the PlayStation Portable: Grand Theft Auto: Liberty City Stories in 2005, which is also a prequel to Grand Theft Auto III; Grand Theft Auto: Vice City Stories in 2006, which is a prequel to Vice City; and Grand Theft Auto: Chinatown Wars in 2009, which features the same setting as Grand Theft Auto IV, but the two games are otherwise unrelated. Both Liberty City Stories and Vice City Stories were later ported to the PlayStation 2, while Chinatown Wars was originally released for the Nintendo DS and later ported to PlayStation Portable.

In 2009, The Lost and Damned and The Ballad of Gay Tony were released for the Xbox 360 as expansion packs to Grand Theft Auto IV; a "strategic alliance" between Rockstar and Microsoft resulted in the timed exclusivity. The expansions focus on characters who played a relatively minor role in the main game, and whose stories take place simultaneously with Grand Theft Auto IV's. Both were later released for the PlayStation 3 and Windows as part of a compilation, titled Grand Theft Auto: Episodes from Liberty City, also available on Xbox 360.

Numerous titles in the series have received ports to mobile devices. Chinatown Wars was released for iOS in 2010 and for Android and Fire OS in 2014. For their tenth anniversaries, Grand Theft Auto III and Vice City were both re-released for iOS and Android in 2011 and 2012, respectively. In 2013, San Andreas was ported to iOS, Android and Windows Phone and RT; the mobile port was later re-released for Xbox 360 in 2014, the year of the game's tenth anniversary, and the following year for PlayStation 3. In 2015, Liberty City Stories was ported to iOS, Android and Fire OS.

=== Compilations ===
Grand Theft Auto Double Pack was released in 2003 for the PlayStation 2 and Xbox, and includes both Grand Theft Auto III and Vice City. Grand Theft Auto: The Trilogy is a compilation of III, Vice City, and San Andreas, and was first released in 2005 for the Xbox. It was later re-released for the PlayStation 2, Windows, Mac OS X, and PlayStation 4. The Trilogy also served as the revised package for San Andreas, which had to be pulled from shelves due to the controversial Hot Coffee mod. A report in August 2021 suggested that Rockstar Dundee was leading development on a remastered version of the trilogy, using Unreal Engine; following some leaks, Rockstar officially announced Grand Theft Auto: The Trilogy – The Definitive Edition, developed by Grove Street Games, on 8 October 2021. The game features graphical and gameplay upgrades, and replaced existing versions on digital retailers. It was released for the Nintendo Switch, PlayStation 4, PlayStation 5, Windows, Xbox One, and Xbox Series X/S on 11 November 2021, and for Android and iOS on 14 December 2023.

Grand Theft Auto: Episodes from Liberty City is a standalone compilation of the two episodes for Grand Theft Auto IV. It contains both The Lost and Damned and The Ballad of Gay Tony on one disc. It was released on 29 October 2009 for the Xbox 360 and on 13 April 2010 for PlayStation 3 and Windows. Microsoft added Episodes from Liberty City to its backwards compatibility list for Xbox One platforms in February 2017. The standalone release of Episodes from Liberty City for Windows was discontinued and replaced by a single-player-only version of Grand Theft Auto IV: Complete Edition in 2020.

=== List of games ===
Year	Title	Developer	Platform(s)				Universe
Year	Title	Developer	Home console	Computer	Handheld	Mobile	Universe
Main series
1997	Grand Theft Auto	DMA Design	PS1	MS-DOS; Windows	GBC		2D
1999	Grand Theft Auto 2	DMA Design	PS1; Dreamcast	Windows	GBC		2D
2001	Grand Theft Auto III	DMA Design	PS2; Xbox	Windows; OS X		Android; iOS; Fire OS	3D
2002	Grand Theft Auto: Vice City	Rockstar North	PS2; Xbox	Windows; OS X		Android; iOS; Fire OS	3D
2004	Grand Theft Auto: San Andreas	Rockstar North	PS2; Xbox; PS3 (Note: Originally available on PlayStation 3 as part of the PlayStation 2 Classics line via the PlayStation Network, but later replaced with a HD native release); Xbox 360 (Note: Originally available on Xbox 360 as part of the Xbox Originals line via the Xbox Live Marketplace, but later replaced with a HD native release)	Windows; OS X		Android; iOS; WP; Fire OS	3D
2008	Grand Theft Auto IV	Rockstar North	PS3; Xbox 360	Windows			HD
2013	Grand Theft Auto V	Rockstar North	PS3; Xbox 360; PS4; Xbox One; PS5; Xbox Series X/S	Windows			HD
2026	Grand Theft Auto VI	Rockstar Games	PS5; Xbox Series X/S				HD
Expansion packs
1999	Grand Theft Auto: London 1969	Rockstar Canada	PS1	MS-DOS; Windows			2D
1999	Grand Theft Auto: London 1961	Rockstar Canada		MS-DOS; Windows			2D
2009	Grand Theft Auto IV: The Lost and Damned	Rockstar North	PS3; Xbox 360	Windows			HD
2009	Grand Theft Auto: The Ballad of Gay Tony	Rockstar North	PS3; Xbox 360	Windows			HD
Handheld games
2004	Grand Theft Auto Advance	Digital Eclipse			GBA		3D
2005	Grand Theft Auto: Liberty City Stories	Rockstar Leeds	PS2		PSP	iOS; Android; Fire OS	3D
2006	Grand Theft Auto: Vice City Stories	Rockstar Leeds	PS2		PSP		3D
2009	Grand Theft Auto: Chinatown Wars	Rockstar Leeds			PSP; DS	iOS; Android; Fire OS	HD
Compilations and remasters
1999	Grand Theft Auto: Director's Cut (Note: Includes Grand Theft Auto and London 1969)	DMA Design / Rockstar Canada	PS1	MS-DOS; Windows			2D
2003	Grand Theft Auto: The Classics Collection (Note: Includes Grand Theft Auto, London 1969, and Grand Theft Auto 2)	DMA Design / Rockstar Canada	PS1	Windows			2D
2003	Grand Theft Auto: Double Pack (Note: Includes Grand Theft Auto III and Vice City)	Rockstar North	PS2; Xbox				3D
2005	Grand Theft Auto: The Trilogy (Note: Includes Grand Theft Auto III, Vice City, and San Andreas)	Rockstar North	Xbox; PS2	Windows; OS X			3D
2009	Grand Theft Auto: Double Pack (Note: Includes Liberty City Stories and Vice City Stories)	Rockstar Leeds	PS2		PSP		3D
2009	Grand Theft Auto: Episodes from Liberty City (Note: Includes The Lost and Damned and The Ballad of Gay Tony)	Rockstar North	Xbox 360; PS3	Windows			HD
2010	Grand Theft Auto IV: Complete Edition (Note: Includes Grand Theft Auto IV, The Lost and Damned and The Ballad of Gay Tony)	Rockstar North	Xbox 360; PS3	Windows			HD
2021	Grand Theft Auto: The Trilogy – The Definitive Edition (Note: Includes remastered versions of Grand Theft Auto III, Vice City, and San Andreas)	Grove Street Games / Video Games Deluxe	Switch (Note: The Nintendo Switch is a hybrid console, combining features of home and handheld systems.); PS4; PS5; Xbox One; Xbox Series X/S	Windows	Switch	Android; iOS	3D

== Related media ==
The series has been expanded into various other formats. Jacked: The Outlaw Story of Grand Theft Auto, a book written by David Kushner chronicling the development of the series, was published in 2012. In March 2015, BBC Two announced The Gamechangers, a 90-minute docudrama based on the creation of Grand Theft Auto. Directed by Owen Harris and written by James Wood, the drama stars Daniel Radcliffe as Rockstar president Sam Houser and Bill Paxton as disbarred attorney Jack Thompson. In May 2015, Rockstar filed a lawsuit against the BBC for trademark infringement, stating that they had no involvement with the development of the film and had unsuccessfully tried to contact the BBC to resolve the matter. It first aired on 15 September 2015 on BBC Two.

In 2006, McFarland & Company published The Meaning and Culture of Grand Theft Auto. Compiled by Nate Garrelts, the 264-page book is a collection of essays regarding the Grand Theft Auto series, to help audiences better understand the games and to make a point about due diligence of game criticism. The book is divided into two parts: the first part discusses the controversies surrounding the series, while the second half takes a theoretical look at the games absent of the controversy.

Roger Corman, who produced the unrelated 1977 film Grand Theft Auto, claimed that any attempted film adaptation of the video game series was unable to proceed. In 2017, he claimed that he sued the "video game manufacturer who flat-out stole the idea", and that they "settled out of court and they gave me some money". He said that he retains the rights, "but the way it was actually written in the contract is a little bit cloudy", and that his lawyers were analysing the contract to ensure that he can remake the film. Take-Two Interactive responded to Corman's claims, noting that the company "owns all rights for films related to the Grand Theft Auto video game series", and that it "can and will take appropriate legal action against anyone attempting to misuse our intellectual property by attempting to make a new film titled Grand Theft Auto"; it claimed to have successfully taken legal action against similar attempts in the past.

== Common elements ==
=== Gameplay ===
Each game in this series allows the player to take on the role of a criminal in the big city, typically an individual who ends up rising through the ranks of organised crime through the course of the game. The player is given various missions by kingpins and major idols in the city underworld which must be completed to progress through the storyline. Assassinations and other violent crimes are featured regularly. Occasionally, taxi driving, firefighting, street racing, bus driving, or learning to fly helicopters and fixed-wing aircraft are also involved in the game. In later titles, notably those released after Grand Theft Auto 2, the player is given a more developed storyline in which they are forced to overcome an unfortunate event (e.g., being betrayed and left for dead), which serves as motivation for the character to advance up the criminal ladder and ultimately leads to the triumph of the character by the end of the storyline.

The Grand Theft Auto series belongs to a genre of free-roaming role-playing video games called open world games, and grants a large amount of freedom to the player. Traditional action games are structured as a single track series of levels with linear gameplay, but in Grand Theft Auto the player can determine the missions that they want to undertake, and their relationship with various characters are changed based on these choices. Influenced by the earlier game Turbo Esprit, the cities of the games can be roamed freely at any point in the game, and are examples of open world video game environments which offer accessible buildings with minor missions in addition to the main storyline. There are exceptions: missions follow a linear, overarching plot. These missions are required to complete in order to unlock new areas in the game.

Grand Theft Auto III and subsequent games have more voice acting and radio stations, which simulate driving to music with disc jockeys, radio personalities, commercials, talk radio, popular music, and American culture. The use of vehicles in an explorable urban environment provides a basic simulation of a working city, complete with pedestrians who generally obey traffic signals. Further details are used to flesh out an open-ended atmosphere that has been used in several other games, such as The Simpsons: Hit & Run, which has less emphasis on crime or violence, and Lego City Undercover, which reverses the roles of police officer and criminal, although the player goes undercover in gangs for a portion of the game.

Criminal activities in Grand Theft Auto games do not go unnoticed by the police. As the player engages in these in-game illegal activities, they may gain a "wanted level", represented by a maximum of five or six stars. A small crime, such as running over a non-player character, may create a one star wanted level situation, while shooting an officer may earn more stars. As the number of stars increase, the amount and strength of the response will increase; a single star might have a few police cars chase after the player, while at 5 or 6 stars, tanks and attack helicopters will chase down the player. Many in-game missions will automatically give the player a wanted level after completing a certain event which they must then get rid of before the mission is complete. Often, trying to keep away from the police while wanted will cause the player to gain even higher wanted levels. The player can remove their character's wanted level by avoiding detection or spending in-game money at specific locations to elude the police (such as a mod shop to repaint their car). Alternatively, if the player-character dies, they will respawn at a hospital and the wanted level will be removed, though the player may lose money, guns, and other benefits they had before being chased. The "wanted level" gameplay concept has become common in similar open world games.

=== Setting ===
Most Grand Theft Auto games are set in fictional parodies of well-known United States cities, in a number of different time periods. The games are split into three different universes (2D, 3D, and HD), each with their own reinterpretations of previously established settings. The universes share the names of cities, several brands, and background characters who never make physical appearances in the games (with a few exceptions), but are otherwise considered to be separate continuities.

==== Liberty City ====
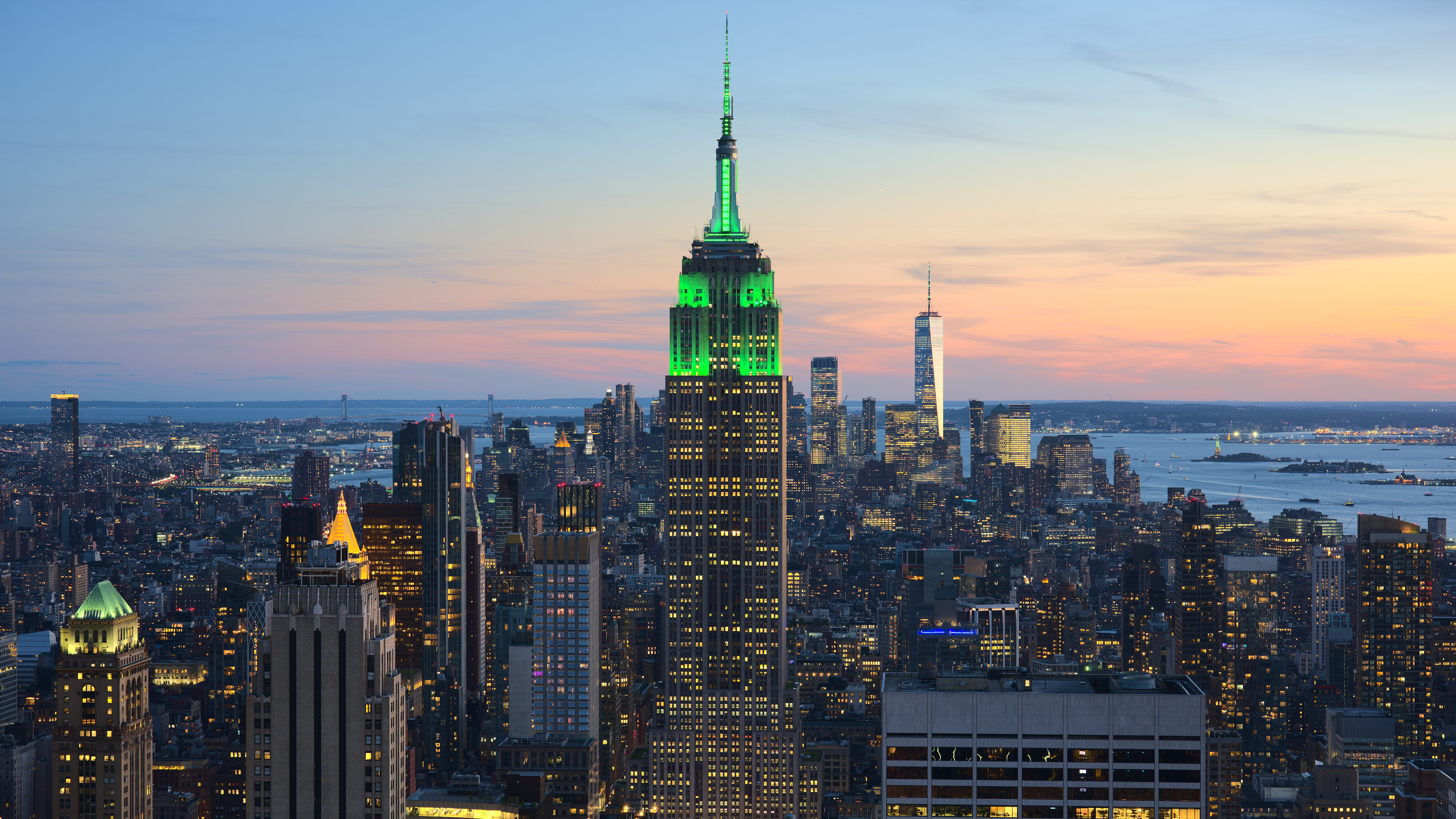
New York City, which serves as the basis for Liberty City

Liberty City, based on New York City, is one of the three original cities introduced in Grand Theft Auto. It is the first setting available to the player. The city encompasses two landmasses (a large one in the southeast and a smaller one in the northeast) and a Manhattan-like central island; two smaller islands are featured along the river that separates the three main islands. The setting also incorporates the neighbouring state of New Guernsey (a parody of New Jersey), which occupies the northwest portion of the map. All four major islands are divided into multiple districts, inspired by New York and New Jersey's boroughs.

A redesigned version of Liberty City was introduced in Grand Theft Auto III (set in 2001). This iteration is only loosely based on New York, and incorporates elements from other US cities, such as Chicago, Philadelphia, Boston, and Detroit. The city encompasses three main islands, which are gradually unlocked as the game's storyline progresses: Portland (based on the industrial areas of Brooklyn and Queens, with additional elements from Manhattan and Long Island), Staunton Island (based mostly on Manhattan), and Shoreside Vale (loosely based on North Jersey, The Bronx, Staten Island, and Upstate New York). The islands are connected by road bridges and an underground tunnel system. A tunnel leading out of Liberty City can be found in Shoreside Vale, but it is impassable by the player. This particular version of Liberty City returned in the prequels Grand Theft Auto Advance (set in 2000) and Grand Theft Auto: Liberty City Stories (set in 1998), albeit with several changes to reflect the different time periods. The city was also mentioned in Grand Theft Auto: Vice City and Grand Theft Auto: San Andreas, and was the setting of a mission in the latter.

A third version of Liberty City was featured in Grand Theft Auto IV, its expansion packs The Lost and Damned and The Ballad of Gay Tony (all three set in 2008), and the handheld game Grand Theft Auto: Chinatown Wars (set in 2009). This iteration closely resembles New York, and consists of four main boroughs, which become available to explore as the story progresses: Broker (based on Brooklyn), Dukes (Queens), Bohan (The Bronx), and Algonquin (Manhattan). The placement of these boroughs mirrors that of their real-life counterparts: Broker and Dukes occupy a large landmass in the southeast, while Bohan forms its own, smaller island in the northeast, and Algonquin acts as the city's central island. The setting also incorporates three smaller islands—Charge Island (Randall's Island), Colony Island (Roosevelt Island), and Happiness Island (Liberty Island)—and a fourth landmass, Alderney, which is located west of Algonquin and regarded as its own independent state (similarly to New Jersey). Alderney is absent in Chinatown Wars. All islands, barring Happiness Island, are connected by road bridges, underground tunnels, and a subway system; none of which lead out of the city.

==== San Andreas ====
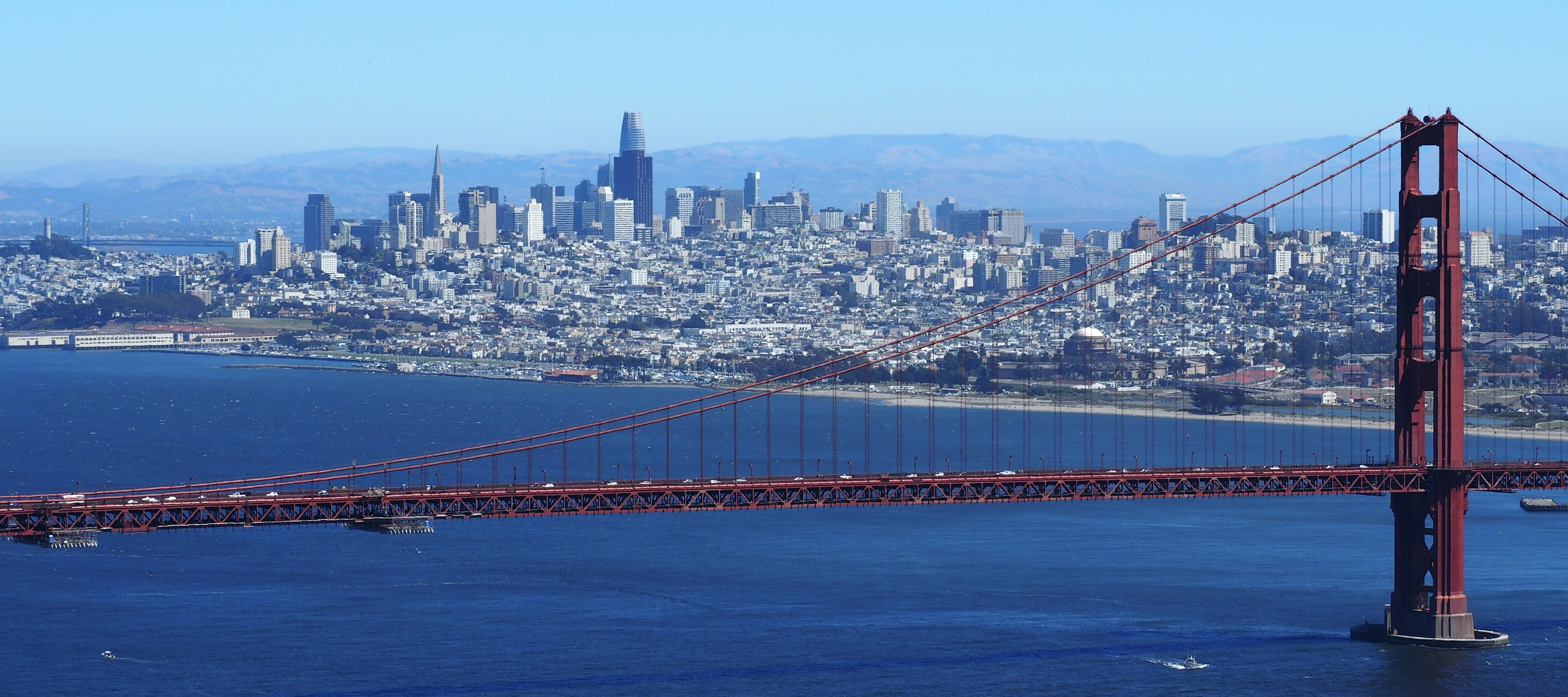
San Francisco, initially the basis for San Andreas and later San Fierro

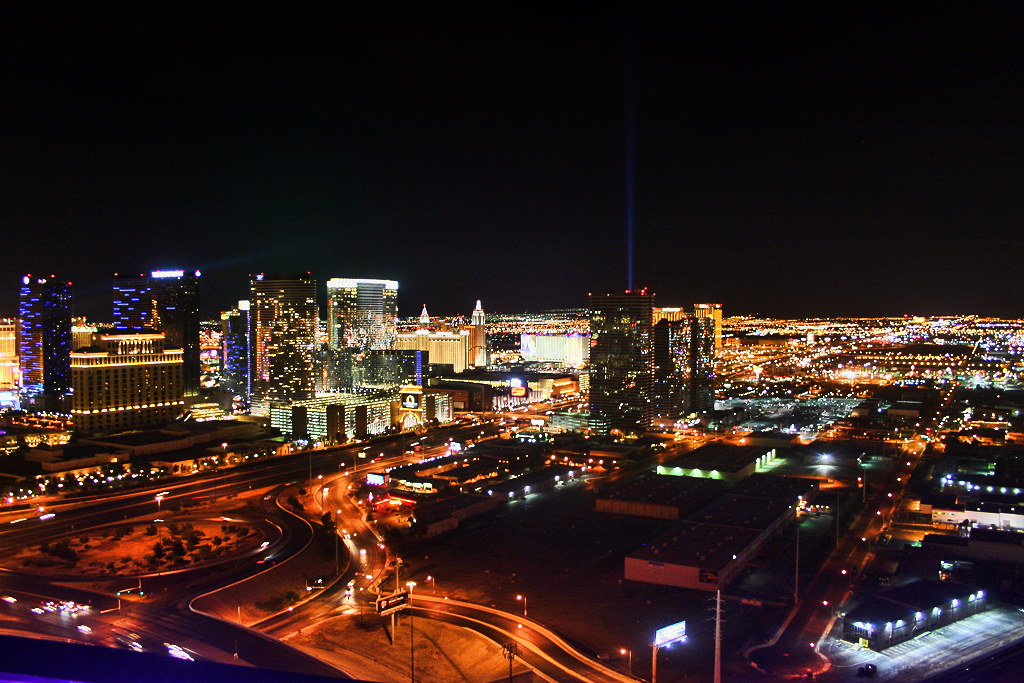
Las Vegas, the basis for Las Venturas

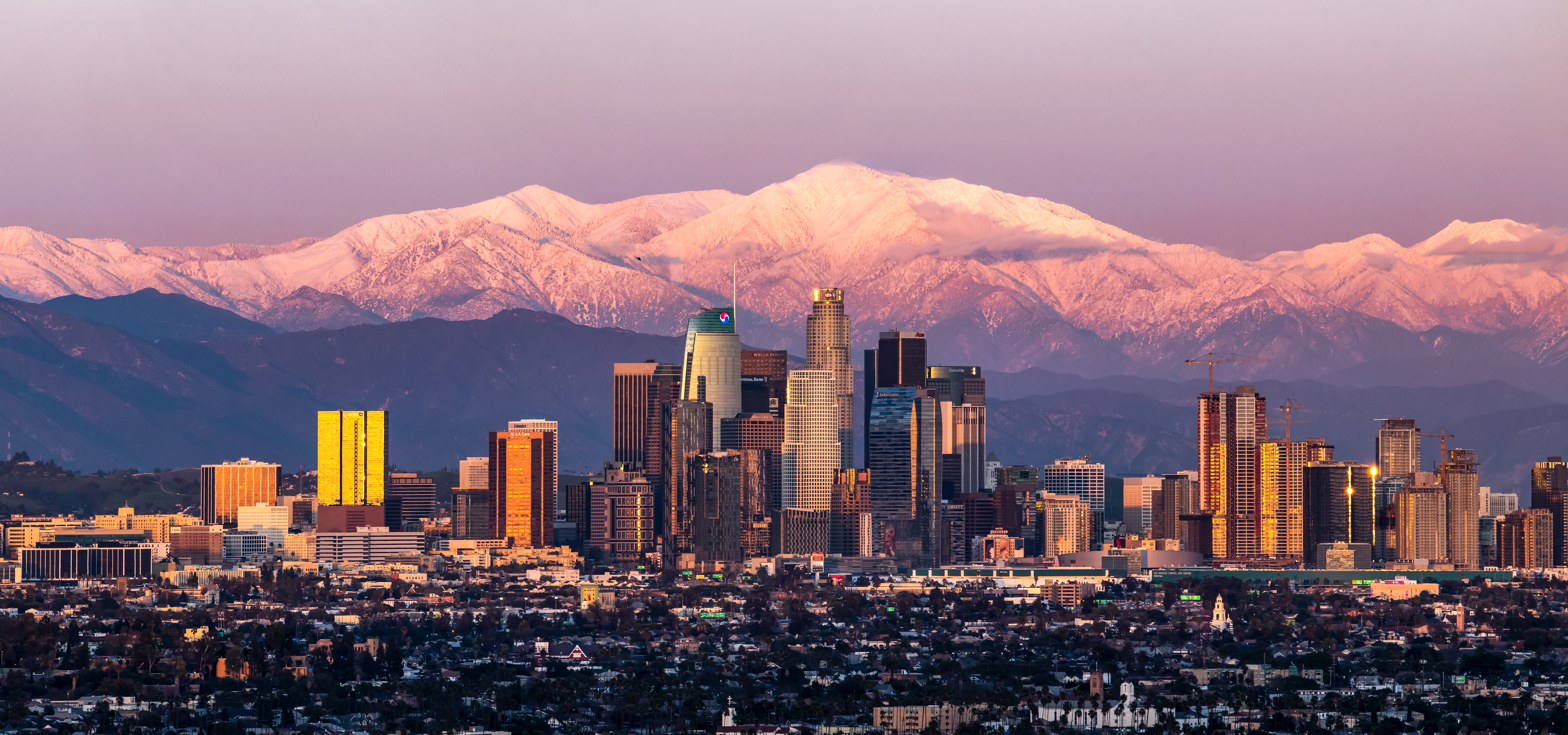
Los Angeles, the basis for Los Santos

San Andreas, based on San Francisco, is one of the three original cities introduced in Grand Theft Auto. It is the second setting available to the player. The locale encompasses two landmasses: a large northern portion, which is divided into fifteen districts and generally considered to be the city's core, and a smaller island in the southeast, consisting of only one district, which acts as the city's docks area. The northern landmass is further divided by Aye Valley, which cuts through the heart of the area from the east to the west.

A reimagined version of San Andreas was featured in Grand Theft Auto: San Andreas (set in 1992), as a state rather than a city. Based on California and Nevada, the state encompasses two landmasses, separated by a river and surrounded by a large body of water. The southern portion of the map features the cities of Los Santos (based on Los Angeles) and San Fierro (San Francisco), separated by vast forest and mountain areas. By contrast, the northern portion is one large desert region and incorporates only one city, Las Venturas (Las Vegas). Both landmasses feature additional rural settlements, which are less inhabited than the three major cities. The cities are connected by a train track system, and each one features an airport, which can be used to fast travel from a city to another. At the beginning of the game, players only have access to Los Santos, with the rest of the map being gradually unlocked as the story progresses.

A third version of San Andreas appeared in Grand Theft Auto V (set in 2013), again imagined as a state. The game features only the southern portion of the state, which is depicted as a large island. The southern portion of the island is occupied mostly by the city of Los Santos (which resembles Los Angeles much more closely than its San Andreas counterpart), while the northern portion, known as Blaine County, is less inhabited, featuring vast areas of desert, forest, and mountain, and only a few small towns. Los Angeles was extensively researched for Grand Theft Auto V. The team organised field research trips with tour guides and architectural historians and captured around 250,000 photos and hours of video footage during these visits. Since the release of the game, hundreds of in-game buildings have been identified as being based on real-world landmarks. The New Yorker's Sam Sweet notes that, with sales of the game reaching thirteen million copies, "there will be more people living in the imaginary state of Los Santos than in the real city on which it was modelled."

==== Vice City ====
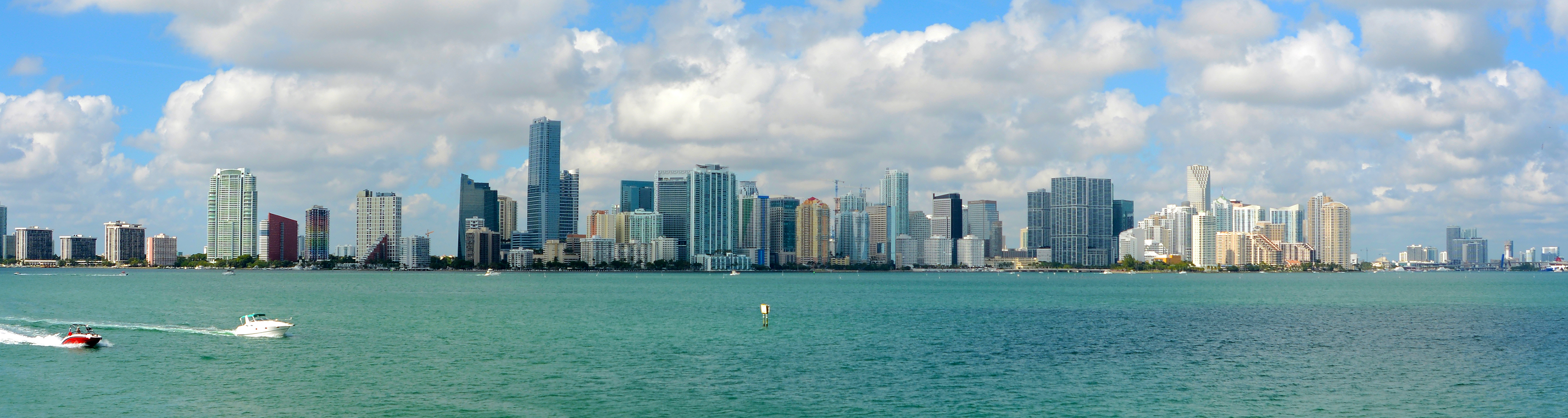
Miami, which serves as the basis for Vice City

Vice City, based on Miami, is one of the three original cities introduced in Grand Theft Auto. It is the third setting available to the player. The city encompasses one large landmass, divided into eight districts which form the city's core, and a smaller island, Vice Beach, in the northeast. Like its real-life counterpart, Vice City is depicted as a tropical city, easily distinguished from the other two in the game by its beaches and palm trees.

A redesigned version of Vice City, located in the state of Florida, was introduced in Grand Theft Auto: Vice City (set in 1986). The city consists of two main landmasses, Vice City Beach and Vice City Mainland, separated by a large body of water and connected to each other and to two smaller islands, Starfish Island and Prawn Island, by a series of road bridges. At the beginning of the game, the player only has access to Vice City Beach, with the rest of the city being gradually unlocked as the story progresses. The same setting would be later used in the prequel Grand Theft Auto: Vice City Stories (set in 1984), albeit with several changes to reflect the earlier time period.

A third version of Vice City was featured as a main setting in Grand Theft Auto VI (set in the present) and was again based on Miami. It was also reimagined as a major city in the fictional state of Leonida, based on Florida, and as the county seat of Vice-Dale County, based on Miami-Dade County. In addition, unlike previous iterations of the city, Vice Beach (known as Vice City Beach in the 3D universe's depictions of Vice City) is its own separate city complete with its own police force, much like the real-world Miami Beach. Beyond Vice-Dale County, Leonida contains four additional counties: Mariana County, Leonard County, Kelly County, and Lummox County. Each county features distinct towns and attractions.

==== Other settings ====
The London 1969 and London 1961 expansion packs for Grand Theft Auto take place within a fictionalised version of London during the 1960s. As such, they are the only games in the series to be primarily set outside of the United States. The portion of the city used in the games is based on Central London, although heavily condensed and mostly geographically inaccurate. It consists of two landmasses, separated by the River Thames and connected by several road bridges. A fictionalised version of Manchester is also featured in the games.

Grand Theft Auto 2 is set in Anywhere City, a fictional US retro futuristic metropolis with no apparent inspiration from any real-life city. The setting consists of three areas, which the player will switch between as the story progresses: the Downtown District, the Residential District, and the Industrial District. Each district is depicted as its own individual island. The game is set in an unspecified time period—conflicting sources suggest anything from "three weeks into the future", to the year 2013, while the game itself features several references to the "new millennium" that is coming, implying that the year is 1999.

Grand Theft Auto V features the fictional town of Ludendorff in the state of North Yankton, which is the setting of two missions and is inaccessible outside of the storyline. The 2020 update for Grand Theft Auto Online, The Cayo Perico Heist, introduced the eponymous fictional island, a "tropical paradise" off the Caribbean coast of Colombia privately owned by notorious drug lord Juan "El Rubio" Strickler. The island is used as both a transshipment base and a partying place by El Rubio, and draws inspiration from Norman's Cay and Hacienda Nápoles. Cayo Perico is the first setting in the series not located in the United States since London.

=== Voice acting ===
The series has included a wide variety of voice actors. The original Grand Theft Auto, its mission packs and its sequel, as well as Grand Theft Auto Advance and Chinatown Wars did not feature any voice credited to specific roles. The first game in the series to do so was Grand Theft Auto III which, despite a limited budget and the series' low profile at the time, featured several notable actors from film and television. These included Frank Vincent, Michael Madsen and Kyle MacLachlan, who all had prominent roles. At the time it was rare for a video game to use such high-profile actors, and Grand Theft Auto III is considered a pioneer in doing so.

The next game, Grand Theft Auto: Vice City, featured more film actors, including Ray Liotta as the player character. Although the following title, Grand Theft Auto: San Andreas, also featured many notable film actors—such as Samuel L. Jackson, Peter Fonda and James Woods—it had been decided that the use of such actors should be reduced, particularly for leading roles. As a result, many of the prominent roles in San Andreas were voiced by lower profile actors or rappers. From Liberty City Stories through to Grand Theft Auto V, the series has continued using lesser known actors to voice main characters, but still uses celebrities and real-life radio personalities to voice the DJs of the many radio stations featured in each game. Some games also feature celebrities portraying themselves, such as Lazlow Jones, Phil Collins, Ricky Gervais, Katt Williams, and Dr. Dre.

== Controversies ==
According to The Guinness World Records 2008 and 2009 Gamer's Edition, it is the most controversial video game series in history, with over 4,000 articles published about it, which include accusations of glamorising violence, corrupting gamers, and connection to real-life crimes.

=== Grand Theft Auto ===
The game was controversial from the first incarnation of the series. Grand Theft Auto was condemned in Britain, Germany, and France due to its "extreme violence", and Brazil banned it outright. Publicist Max Clifford planted sensational stories in tabloids in order to help sell the first game.

=== Grand Theft Auto III ===
Grand Theft Auto III was criticized for its 3D graphics that depicted more realistic violence, while players could restore their health by soliciting prostitutes and, if they wished, kill them to regain some of their money. There was also criticism of the focus on illegal activities in comparison with traditional "heroic" roles that other games offer. The main character can commit crimes and violent acts such as the killing of policemen and military personnel while suffering only temporary consequences.

=== Vice City ===
The sixth game in the series, Grand Theft Auto: Vice City, also came under criticism. One mission in particular, in which the player must instigate a gang war between Haitian and Cuban gangs, has been controversial. Haitian and Cuban anti-defamation groups criticised the game. Jean-Robert Lafortune of the Haitian American Grassroots Coalition is quoted as saying that "The game shouldn't be designed to destroy human life, it shouldn't be designed to destroy an ethnic group," for this and similar scenarios, including lines in the game's script such as "kill the Haitian dickheads" said by character "Diaz" during an altercation between the player and a Haitian gang. After the threat of a lawsuit by the Haitian-American Grassroots Coalition, Rockstar removed the word "Haitians" from this phrase in the game's subtitles.

=== San Andreas ===
San Andreas was criticised initially for its "gangster" elements, which include drugs, prostitution, and murder. It received additional criticism after the discovery of an interactive sex minigame, nicknamed Hot Coffee. Although it had been cut from the game, it remained in the code, and was discovered in both the console and Windows versions. After the release of San Andreas, modders managed to find the unused code in the game and released unofficial patches for the Windows and Xbox (with a modchip) versions as well as a PlayStation 2 version through the use of an Action Replay code enabling the player to engage in these sexual mini-games (dubbed "Hot Coffee" in reference to a euphemism for sex used in the game). These mini-games were left partially intact in the game's code. This prompted application of an AO (Adults Only) ESRB rating to the version of the game containing the leftover code. Take-Two Interactive was forced to re-release the game in order to restore the M (Mature) rating. A class action lawsuit against Take-Two was also filed as a result of the "Hot Coffee" code.

=== Grand Theft Auto IV ===
One of the controversies involved with this game was Mothers Against Drunk Driving's (MADD) criticism of the ability to drink and drive as a new feature. MADD had even requested ESRB to change the rating of the game from "M" for ages seventeen and up to "AO", for adults only, because they felt it was inappropriate for children, even at the age of seventeen, to experience drunk driving in such a manner. In the final game, drunk driving is a playable event, but it is a crime that automatically generates a wanted rating and main playable character Niko Bellic loudly (and drunkenly) proclaims that it is a "bad idea" and that he "should know better". Notably, it is impossible to drive while drunk in the GTA IV expansions, The Lost and Damned and The Ballad of Gay Tony. These were released after the criticism. It is, however, possible to drive drunk again in the successor, Grand Theft Auto V.

=== The Lost and Damned ===
The Lost and Damned expansion pack for Grand Theft Auto IV was condemned by US parents group Common Sense Media who issued a public warning against the pack's content due to a full-frontal nudity scene during one of the cutscenes. They claimed the game was "more controversial than its predecessors" because it featured "full frontal male nudity".

=== Chinatown Wars ===
Nintendo wanted us to make Grand Theft Auto, and we wanted to make a game on their platform. They didn't want us to make a Grand Theft Auto for kids, and we weren't interested in making a game we wouldn't normally make.

— Dan Houser, on the making of Chinatown Wars for the Nintendo DS

There has been some controversy over a drug dealing minigame along with comments that some Nintendo games are being aimed at children (despite the fact that the game was rated Mature). The drug dealing mini-game allows players to peddle six types of drugs around the city, but the profit the player makes depends on market conditions, which will be based on the area in which they deal, and the level of regular service this area receives from them.

=== Grand Theft Auto V ===
A segment in Grand Theft Auto V caused controversy for scenes containing player-initiated torture. The mission "By the Book" features graphic depictions of kneecapping, electrocution, dental extraction and waterboarding, and the player is required to perform an act of torture in order to progress in the game. UK-based charity Freedom from Torture publicly condemned the use of torture scenes in Grand Theft Auto V. The organisation, who works to rehabilitate survivors of torture, joined other human rights charities who were outraged at a torture scene in the game in which the players have to pull teeth and electrocute an unarmed man in order to extract information. The charity's CEO Keith Best stated: "Rockstar North has crossed a line by effectively forcing people to take on the role of a torturer and perform a series of unspeakable acts if they want to achieve success in the game."

Grand Theft Auto V has been accused of sexism. The Los Angeles Times considered the game's satirical portrayals of women uncreative, and added that violent and sexist themes hurt the game experience. Edge noted that while "every female in the game exists solely to be sneered, leered or laughed at", it treated its all-male lead characters in a similar vein through their stereotyped tendencies towards violence. Sam Houser, Rockstar Games co-founder, felt that the development team sometimes overlooked their portrayal of women in Grand Theft Auto games, but that the weight towards male characters "fit with the story we wanted to tell".

=== Lawsuits ===
Several celebrities have sued Rockstar Games and/or Take-Two Interactive for purportedly violating their intellectual property or personality rights, including hip-hop artist Daz Dillinger, Karen Gravano of Mob Wives, and actress Lindsay Lohan.

==== Lawsuits involving Jack Thompson ====
Former lawyer Jack Thompson has been involved in a number of attempts to get families of murder victims to hold the Grand Theft Auto series accountable for the death of their loved ones. Due to his conduct in this and related cases, Thompson was disbarred in 2008, and was fined more than $100,000 by the Florida Bar Association.

On 20 October 2003, the families of Aaron Hamel and Kimberly Bede, two young people shot by teens William and Josh Buckner (who in statements to investigators claimed their actions were inspired by Grand Theft Auto III) filed a US$246 million lawsuit against publishers Rockstar Games, Take-Two Interactive Software, retailer Walmart, and PlayStation 2 manufacturer Sony Computer Entertainment America. Rockstar and its parent company, Take-Two, filed for dismissal of the lawsuit, stating in US District Court on 29 October 2003 that the "ideas and concepts as well as the 'purported psychological effects' on the Buckners are protected by the First Amendment's free-speech clause". The lawyer of the victims, Jack Thompson, denied that, but failed in his attempt to move the lawsuit into a state court and under Tennessee's consumer protection act. Two days later, the plaintiffs filed a Notice of Voluntary Dismissal, and the case was closed.

In February 2005, a lawsuit was brought upon the makers and distributors of the Grand Theft Auto series, claiming the games caused a teenager to shoot and kill three members of the Alabama police force. The shooting occurred in June 2003: Devin Moore, then 17 years old, was taken in for questioning by police in Fayette, Alabama, regarding a stolen vehicle. Moore then grabbed a pistol from one of the police officers and shot and killed him along with another officer and dispatcher before fleeing in a police car. One of Moore's attorneys, Jack Thompson, claimed it was Grand Theft Auto's graphic nature—with his constant playing time—that caused Moore to commit the murders, and Moore's family agrees. Damages were being sought from branches of GameStop and Wal-Mart in Jasper, Alabama, the stores from which Grand Theft Auto III and Grand Theft Auto: Vice City, respectively, were purchased and also from the games' publisher Take-Two Interactive, and the PlayStation 2 manufacturer Sony Computer Entertainment. On 29 March 2006 the case was dismissed and permission to appeal was denied.

In May 2005, Jack Thompson appeared via satellite on the Glenn Beck program on CNN's Headline News. Thompson mentioned Devin Moore and said, regarding Grand Theft Auto III and Grand Theft Auto: Vice City, "There's no doubt in my mind ... that but for Devin Moore's training on this cop killing simulator, he would not have been able to kill three cops in Fayette, Alabama, who are now dead and in the ground. We are suing Take-Two, Sony, Wal-Mart, and GameStop for having trained Devin Moore to kill. He had no history of violence. No criminal record."

In September 2006, Thompson brought another lawsuit, claiming that Cody Posey played the game obsessively before murdering his father Delbert Paul Posey, stepmother Tryone Schmid, and stepsister Marilea Schmid on a ranch in Albuquerque, New Mexico. The suit was filed on behalf of the victims' families. The suit alleged that were it not for his obsessive playing of Grand Theft Auto: Vice City, the murders would not have taken place. Named in the suit were Cody Posey, Rockstar Games, Take-Two Interactive, and Sony. The suit asked for US$600 million in damages. During the criminal trial, Posey's defence team argued he was abused by his father, and tormented by his stepmother. Posey was also taking Zoloft at the time of the killings. The lawsuit was dismissed in December 2007.

==== Thailand taxi driver murder case ====
On 2 August 2008, 50-year-old taxi driver Khuan Phokaeng was murdered in Bangkok, Thailand, by an 18-year-old high school student who was infatuated with Grand Theft Auto and also showing signs of video game addiction. The teenager wanted to emulate a carjacking like in the game and rob the driver to finance his gaming habits. As a result of his father's killing, the 25-year-old son of the victim sued the distributor of Grand Theft Auto in Thailand, which the government had already banned the day after Phokaeng's murder.

=== Modding and fan recreations ===
Modding of Grand Theft Auto content, either within Grand Theft Auto games or recreated via other software, has been generally performed by the player community since around the early 2000s, with one of the first major conversions being the recreation of Grand Theft Auto III's Liberty City within the game engine running Vice City. Around 2017, Take Two began taking action against these mods, specifically issuing a cease and desist letter to the makers of OpenIV, a piece of software that allowed players to alter content from Grand Theft Auto IV and V. Take-Two said at the time that its issue was not directly with the mod itself, but that it "enables recent malicious mods that allow harassment of players and interfere with the GTA Online experience for everybody", and that it was working with OpenIV to find an amenable solution. OpenIV developers opted to remove the mod from circulation after several rounds of discussion with Take-Two. Take-Two issued a statement to clarify that it would not take action against single-player mods; this statement was updated in 2019 to exclude modders from including other Take-Two intellectual property or from "making new games, stories, missions, or maps".

The Grand Theft Auto modding community worked under this response to continue to build mods and other content within the bounds set by Take-Two. In February 2021, Take-Two, under the Digital Millennium Copyright Act (DMCA), issued a takedown request for two projects hosted on GitHub that had reverse-engineered the game engines for Grand Theft Auto III and Vice City, asserting that such reverse-engineering was disallowed by the game's end-user licence agreement. On 10 June 2021, the project developers filed a counter-notice; per DMCA rules regarding disputes, the source code was restored after two weeks. Take-Two CEO Strauss Zelnick stated the company has a "pretty flexible" view on user mods, asserting that "if the economy is threatened, or if there's bad behaviour, and we know how to define that, then we would issue a takedown notice". However, the company proceeded to continue to file a lawsuit in California against the programmers behind this effort in September 2021, asserting that the programmers "are well aware that they do not possess the right to copy, adapt, or distribute derivative GTA source code, or the audiovisual elements of the games, and that doing so constitutes copyright infringement." As part of the lawsuit, Take-Two issued another takedown notice to GitHub to remove the mods in October 2021. The modders, in their legal reply, asserted that use of the assets were within fair use, as the reverse-engineered versions were transformative in nature and, as neither Rockstar nor Take Two had issued any updates for years, did not harm the commercial prospects of the games.

== Reception ==
Aggregate review scores As of 19 November 2026.
Game	GameRankings	Metacritic
Grand Theft Auto	(PC) 79% (PS1) 68% (GBC) 57%	—
London 1969	(PC) 75% (PS1) 69%	—
Grand Theft Auto 2	(PC) 72% (DC) 71% (PS1) 70% (GBC) 35%	(PS1) 70
Grand Theft Auto III	(PS2) 95% (PC) 94%	(PS2) 97 (Xbox) 96 (PC) 93
Vice City	(PS2) 94% (PC) 94%	(Xbox) 96 (PS2) 95 (PC) 94
San Andreas	(PS2) 95% (Xbox) 92% (PC) 92%	(PS2) 95 (Xbox) 93 (PC) 93
Advance	(GBA) 70%	(GBA) 68
Liberty City Stories	(PSP) 87% (PS2) 77%	(PSP) 88 (PS2) 78
Vice City Stories	(PSP) 85% (PS2) 76%	(PSP) 86 (PS2) 75
Grand Theft Auto IV	(PS3) 97% (X360) 97% (PC) 88%	(PS3) 98 (X360) 98 (PC) 90
The Lost and Damned	(PC) 94% (PS3) 94% (X360) 90%	(X360) 90 (PS3) 88
Chinatown Wars	(NDS) 93% (PSP) 90%	(NDS) 93 (PSP) 90
The Ballad of Gay Tony	(PC) 90% (PS3) 90% (X360) 90%	(X360) 89 (PS3) 87
Grand Theft Auto V	(XONE) 98% (PS3) 97% (PS4) 96% (X360) 96% (PC) 95%	(XONE) 97 (PS3) 97 (PS4) 97 (X360) 97 (PC) 96
Grand Theft Auto VI	— (Note: GameRankings was discontinued in December 2019, with its staff being merged with the similar aggregator Metacritic.)	(PS5) 99/100 (XSXS) 99/100

Ever since the release of Grand Theft Auto III in 2001, the Grand Theft Auto series has been a major success, both critically and financially. It has shipped over 480 million units, making it one of the best-selling video game franchises and highest-grossing media franchises of all time. In 2006, Grand Theft Auto was voted one of Britain's top 10 designs in the Great British Design Quest organised by the BBC and the Design Museum. The game appeared in a list of British design icons which included Concorde, Jaguar E-Type, Aston Martin DB5, Mini, World Wide Web, Tomb Raider, K2 telephone box, London tube map, AEC Routemaster bus and the Supermarine Spitfire.

The series has broken several records, resulting in Guinness World Records awarding the series 10 world records in the Gamer's Edition 2008. These records include Most Guest Stars in a Video Game Series, Largest Voice Cast in a Video Game (Grand Theft Auto: San Andreas), Largest In-Game Soundtrack (Grand Theft Auto: San Andreas) as well as Most Successful Entertainment Launch of All Time (Grand Theft Auto V). Guinness World Records also ranked Grand Theft Auto in third place on their list of top 50 console games of all time based on initial impact and lasting legacy. Grand Theft Auto: San Andreas is listed as the most successful game on the PlayStation 2 according to The Guinness World Records 2009 Gamer's Edition.

Grand Theft Auto III, San Andreas and Vice City currently lie at the 2nd, 5th and 6th highest rated PlayStation 2 games on Metacritic, respectively, while Chinatown Wars is rated the best game on the Nintendo DS, and is the second best on the PlayStation Portable, and Grand Theft Auto IV is currently rated the second best game ever, with a score of 98, only trailing behind The Legend of Zelda: Ocarina of Time. Moreover, Vice City and Grand Theft Auto V lie at 11th and 2nd best PC games of all time on Metacritic. Along with this, The Lost and Damned and The Ballad of Gay Tony are currently placed 35th and 59th in the top Xbox 360 games. The Grand Theft Auto series has become such a juggernaut that since the release of Grand Theft Auto V, other video game companies have rescheduled their releases to avoid releasing within the same month of Rockstar's games.

=== Sales ===
Year	Game	Sales	Acquired label(s)
1997	Grand Theft Auto	6 million	PS1 Greatest Hits, Platinum
1999	Grand Theft Auto: London 1969	Unknown	
1999	Grand Theft Auto: London 1961	Unknown	
1999	Grand Theft Auto 2	1 million	PS1 Greatest Hits
2001	Grand Theft Auto III	17.5 million	PS2 Greatest Hits, Platinum
2002	Grand Theft Auto: Vice City	20 million	PS2 Greatest Hits, Platinum
2004	Grand Theft Auto: San Andreas	27.5 million	PS2 Greatest Hits, Platinum; Xbox Platinum Hits; PS3 Greatest Hits; Xbox 360 Platinum Hits
2004	Grand Theft Auto Advance	100,000	
2005	Grand Theft Auto: Liberty City Stories	8 million	PSP Greatest Hits, Platinum; PS2 Platinum
2006	Grand Theft Auto: Vice City Stories	4.5 million	PSP Greatest Hits, Platinum; PS2 Platinum
2008	Grand Theft Auto IV	25 million+	PS3 Greatest Hits, Platinum; Xbox 360 Platinum Hits
2009	Grand Theft Auto IV: The Lost and Damned	1 million+	
2009	Grand Theft Auto: Chinatown Wars	200,000	PSP Greatest Hits
2009	Grand Theft Auto: The Ballad of Gay Tony	Unknown	
2009	Grand Theft Auto: Episodes from Liberty City	160,000+	PS3 Greatest Hits; Xbox 360 Platinum Hits
2013	Grand Theft Auto V	<235 million	PS3 Greatest Hits; Xbox 360 Platinum Hits
2026	Grand Theft Auto VI	32.5 million	
Total series sales: 512.5 million+

== Similar games ==
The release of Grand Theft Auto III is treated as a major event in the history of video games, considered a revolutionary title in the medium, much like the release of Doom nearly a decade earlier. During interviews to mark the 10th anniversary of the release of Grand Theft Auto III, producer of the Street Fighter series, Yoshinori Ono, said "It would be no exaggeration to say that Grand Theft Auto III changed the industry, and we can basically separate the time before and after its emergence as distinct eras." In the same article, Bethesda Game Studios director Todd Howard said, "The mark of a truly great game is how many people try to recapture or emulate it and fail. There's a long line behind this one."

Subsequent games that follow this formula of driving and shooting have been called "Grand Theft Auto clones". Some reviewers even extended this label to the Driver series, even though this series began years before the release of Grand Theft Auto III. Grand Theft Auto clones are a type of 3D action-adventure game, (Note: Attributed to multiple references:) where players are given the ability to drive any vehicle or fire any weapon as they explore an open world. These games often incorporate violent and criminal themes. Notable games that are comparable to Grand Theft Auto are Saints Row, Scarface: The World Is Yours, True Crime: Streets of LA, Watch Dogs, Sleeping Dogs, Just Cause, Mafia, and The Godfather.

== See also ==
- GTA gang – Gang of murderers and terrorists in Russia
