= Vivox =

Telecommunications and entertainment software company

Vivox, Inc.
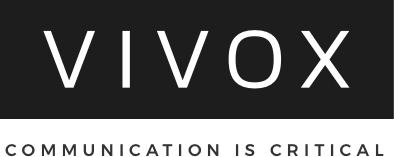
- Type: Subsidiary
- Industry: Video games, Voip
- Founded: 2005; 21 years ago
- Headquarters: Framingham, Massachusetts, United States
- Key people: Rob Seaver (CEO)
- Number of employees: 40+
- Parent: Unity
- Website: www.unity.com/products/vivox/

Vivox Inc. is an American communications company that manages communication services in the form of integrated voice chat, Instant Messaging (IM) to online games, virtual worlds and other online communities. It is headquartered in Framingham, Massachusetts.

== History ==
Vivox was founded by Jeff Pulver in 2005. On September 19, 2005, Vivox announced they had received $6 million in venture capital funding from Canaan Partners and GrandBanks Capital.

On November 13, 2007, Vivox announced they had secured $7.8 million in Series B financing. This funding was led by Benchmark Capital and supported by existing investors Canaan Partners and GrandBanks Capital. With the support of Benchmark Capital, former CEO of JAMDAT Mobile, Mitch Lasky, was added to the Vivox board of directors.

On February 2, 2010, Vivox announced that they had raised $6.8 Million in funding for their Series C funding. The round was led by IDG Ventures and included follow-on investments from existing investors, Benchmark Capital, Canaan Partners and GrandBanks Capital. In addition, IDG Ventures managing director Phil Sanderson joined the Vivox Board.

On January 29, 2019, Unity acquired Vivox for an undisclosed amount.

== Major announcements ==
On May 10, 2006, CCP Games and Vivox announced that EVE Online players would have real-time, in-game voice communication as the result of an agreement between the two companies. Vivox provided CCP with an integrated solution that allows players to speak with each other in-game, and create audio conference channels for their gang, corporation or alliance.

On February 27, 2007, Vivox announced a partnership with Linden Lab and that they would provide integrated voice communications to the Second Life Grid. This included spatial audio that allows residents to hear each other based on their positions. This technology was licensed by DiamondWare Technologies.

During the 2008 Game Developers Conference in San Francisco, California, Vivox announced a partnership with Sony Online Entertainment. The agreement between the two companies brought integrated voice chat into all existing and planned SOE products including SOE's out of game communication application, Station Launcher. SOE games that use Vivox Voice include EverQuest, APB, EverQuest 2, Star Wars Galaxies, and Planetside 2.

On May 13, 2008, Vivox and NCsoft announced a partnership that would bring voice to the NCsoft player community.

On September 16, 2008, it was announced that Vivox would provide voice technology for 38 Studios' upcoming MMO.

On March 24, 2009, Vivox and Real Time Worlds declared that Vivox would provide a voice for Real Time Worlds' MMO, APB. Vivox's spatial 3D voice technology was also included within the game.

Vivox provided its software for Epic Games' Fortnite Battle Royale on the Nintendo Switch (Vivox was already used by the game across other platforms), which otherwise lacked a voice chat function without using the Nintendo Switch Online companion phone app. Vivox's software provided a direct voice chat solution (not requiring the mobile app) that also supports cross-platform communications. Vivox announced in February 2019 it will provide its software development kit for Switch voice chat so that other games can take advantage of this approach.

== Controversy ==
In 2019, Vivox encountered backlash from the Linux community for encouraging game developers to drop Linux support, rather than making their software compatible with Linux. A developer for Alderon Games, working on the MMO dinosaur game Path of Titans, received this reply from Vivox when they asked about paying them to add Linux support:

"Have you considered eliminating Linux from your platforms? It might not be worth the cost to roll your own solution as evidenced by the amount of publishers and developers that use us. We don't have anything that is going to work in your use case, and wish you the best of luck with TS, but if you decide it's not worth the trouble to support what will likely be the smallest user base for your project, we're here to help. I'm going to close out this ticket but if you need anything else, please let me know."

Vivox replied to community dissatisfaction saying:

"We would like to clear the air. Earlier this week in an online chat with a potential client, a member of our team suggested that the client should consider dropping development for Linux because we currently do not provide voice-and-text chat service for the platform. This was not the right response and we have taken measures to address this. We believe that you should create on whatever platform best suits your project. In the future, we do anticipate developing for Linux and the more games created for and ported to that platform, the faster that support will likely come."

In June 2026, Vivox released a Linux SDK.

== Integrations ==
=== Online games and virtual worlds ===
Known integrations of Vivox's communications platform in online games and virtual worlds.

Company	Product	Status
505 Games	Hawken	Live
Ammobox Studios	Eximius: Seize the Frontline	Live
Bethesda Game Studios	Fallout 76	Live
Bigpoint Games	Bigpoint	N/A (TBD)
Black Matter	Hell Let Loose	Live
Blizzard Entertainment	Overwatch	Live
En Masse Entertainment (formerly Bluehole Interactive)	PlayerUnknown's Battlegrounds	Live
En Masse Entertainment (formerly Bluehole Interactive)	TERA	N/A (TBD)
CCP Games	EVE Online	Live
CCP Games	Dust 514	Live
Cryptic Studios	Neverwinter	Live
Cryptic Studios	Star Trek Online	Live
Crytek	Hunt: Showdown	Live
Crytek	Warface	N/A (TBD)
CyberSports	Football Superstars	Live
Daybreak Game Company	DC Universe Online	Live
Daybreak Game Company	EverQuest	Live
Daybreak Game Company	EverQuest II	Live
Daybreak Game Company	H1Z1: Just Survive	Live
Daybreak Game Company	H1Z1: King of the Kill	Live
Daybreak Game Company	PlanetSide 2	Live
Electronic Arts	Command & Conquer 4	Live
Epic Games	Fortnite	Live (Voice chat on Nintendo Switch only)
Epic Games	Paragon	N/A (TBD)
Epic Games	Unreal Engine	N/A (TBD)
Epic Games	Unreal Tournament	N/A (TBD)
EXBO	Stalcraft	Live
Gaia Online	zOMG!	Removed
Gaijin Entertainment	War Thunder	Live
Grey Box	Dreadnought	N/A (TBD)
Hi-Rez Studios	Global Agenda	Live
Hi-Rez Studios	Paladins	Live
Hi-Rez Studios	Smite	Live
Icarus Studios	Fallen Earth	Live
IMVU	IMVU	Removed
Kinetic Games	Phasmophobia	Live
Krafton	PUBG	Live
Linden Lab	Second Life	Live
Lucky VR Inc.	PokerStars VR	Live
Mail.ru	Allods Online	N/A (TBD)
Mail.ru	Skyforge	N/A (TBD)
Metaversum	Twinity	Live
Motiga	Gigantic	N/A (TBD)
Nexon Corporation	Combat Arms	Removed
Nexon	War Rock	N/A
Obsidian Entertainment	Armored Warfare	N/A (TBD)
Other Ocean	Project Winter	Live
Panzerdog	Tacticool	
Perfect World	Arc Client	Live
Piranha Games	MechWarrior Online	Removed
Red Barrels	The Outlast Trials	Live
Red Duck	Alliance of Valiant Arms	N/A (TBD)
Red Duck	Metro Conflict	N/A (TBD)
Reloaded Productions	APB: All Points Bulletin	Early Release
Riot Games	League of Legends	Live
Riot Games	Valorant	Live
Runewaker Entertainment	Runes of Magic	Live
Siege Camp (Formerly Clapfoot)	Foxhole	Live
VOID Interactive	Ready or Not	Live
Ubisoft Montreal	Rainbow Six Siege	Live
Wargaming	World of Tanks	since 0.6.2.7
Wargaming	World of Warships	Live
Wizards of the Coast	Dungeons & Dragons Insider	N/A (TBD)
ZeniMax Online Studios	The Elder Scrolls Online	Live

=== Middleware platforms ===
Known middleware integrations of Vivox's communications platform.

Company	Product
BigWorld Technology	BigWorld Technology Suite
Icarus Studios	Icarus Developer Tools Suite
Monumental Games	Monumental Technology Suite
Multiverse Network	Multiverse Platform
Simutronics	HeroEngine

== Other products ==
=== C3 - Command, Control, Communicate ===
C3 is a standalone voice-over-Internet-Protocol (VoIP) client where computer users are able to connect and speak with fellow computer users. C3 allows users to chat both through text and voice by creating chat channels with a maximum capacity of 100 users in each channel.

The target audience of C3 is gamers who can use the software to communicate with other gamers among the same guild, team, clan, etc. on an online multiplayer game (MMO). Voice communication allows for players to use teamwork to their advantage while creating a sense of online community.

== See also ==
- Ventrilo
- TeamSpeak
- Roger Wilco
- Mumble
