= Crackdown =

Crackdown or Crack Down may refer to

- Crackdown (TV series)
- Crack Down, 1989 video game
- Crackdown (video game series)
  - Crackdown (video game)
  - Crackdown 2
  - Crackdown 3
- Crackdown (podcast)
- Crackdown (film), a 1991 American film
- The Crackdown, a 1983 album
- Death Wish 4: The Crackdown, 1987 American film
