= Rockstar Dundee =

British video game developer

Rockstar Dundee Limited

- Headquarters at The Vision Building, Dundee (pictured in 2023)
- Formerly: Ruffian Games Limited (2008–2020)
- Type: Subsidiary
- Industry: Video games
- Founded: April 2008; 18 years ago
- Founders: Gary Liddon; Billy Thomson; Gareth Noyce
- Headquarters: Dundee, Scotland
- Key people: Gary Liddon (studio director); Billy Thomson (studio director)
- Products: Crackdown 2
- Number of employees: ≈40 (2020)
- Parent: Rockstar Games (2020–present)

Rockstar Dundee Limited (formerly Ruffian Games Limited) is a British video game developer and a studio of Rockstar Games based in Dundee. The studio is best known for developing Crackdown 2.

Gary Liddon, Billy Thomson, and Gareth Noyce founded the company as Ruffian Games in April 2008. They had previously worked on Crackdown, with Thomson as its lead designer while at Realtime Worlds. Ruffian Games immediately partnered with Microsoft for Crackdown 2, being chosen over Realtime Worlds. Released in 2010, the game did not sell well enough to allow for a third Crackdown game and Ruffian Games joined co-development projects, including several Kinect games, to stay afloat. Game of Glens and Hollowpoint were cancelled, while a Streets of Rage remake was unsuccessfully pitched. After independently releasing Fragmental and RADtv, the studio was working with Rockstar Games by October 2019. The publisher's parent company, Take-Two Interactive, acquired Ruffian Games in October 2020 and integrated it with Rockstar Games as Rockstar Dundee.

== History ==
=== Early years and Crackdown 2 (2008–2013) ===
Ruffian Games's logo until October 2020

Gary Liddon, Billy Thomson, and Gareth Noyce founded Rockstar Dundee as Ruffian Games in April 2008. Thomson had led the design for Crackdown at Realtime Worlds, while Liddon and Noyce had worked at Xen Group, a technology provider for the game. Thomson associated with Xen Group following Crackdown's 2007 release. Ruffian Games's name was derived from an event in Thomson's childhood where he was referred to as "a ruffian" by a school classmate's father, who believed that Thomson had a bad influence on his son. Thomson had relayed the story to Liddon, who suggested that they use the name "Ruffian Games" for their venture. Liddon, Thomson, and Noyce assumed the roles of studio head, creative director, and development director, respectively. The company moved into Dundee-based offices in October 2008 and its formation was announced in January 2009. By this time, the 15-person team comprised former developers of Crackdown, Fable II, MotoGP, and the Grand Theft Auto series, among them "five or six" who joined from Realtime Worlds. In February, the company hired Steve Iannetta and Ed Campbell, designers for Crackdown, as lead designer and senior designer, respectively. It recruited 15 further people in May. The headcount grew to 49 by November 2009, partially helped by closures and layoffs affecting other local studios, such as Midway Studios – Newcastle.

By the time of its formation announcement, Ruffian Games had entered into a contract with a "major publisher". Microsoft partnered with the studio for Crackdown 2, forgoing Realtime Worlds as it was preoccupied with APB: All Points Bulletin. When this deal was rumoured, Realtime Worlds's studio head, Colin MacDonald, stated that his studio was still in talks with Microsoft to develop another Crackdown game. He doubted that the publisher "would harm an otherwise fruitful existing development relationship" by partnering with a different developer also based in Dundee. After Ruffian Games was announced as developing Crackdown 2 in June 2009, David Jones, the chief executive officer of Realtime Worlds, stated that he was "a bit miffed" at Microsoft for handing Ruffian Games the development of the game, as he considered the studio's proximity to Realtime Worlds a threat. In response, Thomson opined that Ruffian Games was capable of creating a proper sequel to Crackdown because it had hired talent from every department that worked on the original game.

Crackdown 2's development was quick but difficult. The studio was beset by deadlines it deemed unmanageable and the expectations of fans of the original Crackdown. The production lasted just over one year and was described as "intense, exhausting". The resulting game, released in mid-2010, received mixed reviews and did not sell well enough for the studio to immediately start working on a third Crackdown game. To remain in business, Ruffian Games worked with Microsoft on several games for the Kinect peripheral, including Kinect Star Wars and Nike+ Kinect Training. Around 2012, the studio created an experimental multiplayer mode for Crytek's Ryse: Son of Rome, although this work was not released with the final game. Of several cancelled projects, Streets of Rage was a pitch to Sega for a remake of the 1991 game of the same name. The prototype was created by a small team within six to eight weeks but the project went unsigned. A third Crackdown game remained implausible as of 2013.

=== Independent and cancelled projects (2013–2019) ===
In February 2013, Ruffian Games announced Tribal Towers. The game was conceptualised as "a quirky, side-on, real-time projectile combat game" but an alpha test phase showed that the game and its controls were too complicated. After temporarily putting the game on hold, the studio reworked it as Game of Glens, a game inspired by competitive Highland games that combined elements of Angry Birds, Minecraft, and World of Goo. When Square Enix launched the pilot phase of its crowdfunding initiative, Square Enix Collective, in January 2014, Game of Glens was among the three games seeking funding. User polls conducted for the three projects showed that only 39% of respondents were ready to fund Game of Glens, compared to 90% for World War Machine and 83% for Moon Hunters. Much of the backlash stemmed from users expecting another Crackdown game from Ruffian Games rather than a casual game. As a result, development of Game of Glens was halted in April 2014.

Noyce left Ruffian Games in late 2013, moved to Finland with his girlfriend, and became an indie game developer. He had attempted to create a Finnish satellite studio for the company to take advantage of investment opportunities in the country but "it was probably the wrong time to make the move and it didn't quite work out". In August 2014, Ruffian Games announced the cooperative action game Hollowpoint with Paradox Interactive as its publisher. Paradox Interactive had penned a deal with Sony that would have made the game temporarily exclusive on consoles to the PlayStation 4. However, shortly after releasing a second trailer in mid-2015, Ruffian Games and Paradox Interactive ended their partnership due to creative differences. The game's development was put on hold and the publisher intended to re-evaluate the game's creative direction. The studio then worked on Fragmental, a twin-stick shooter with local multiplayer inspired by Hotline Miami that the studio self-published in Steam Early Access in February 2016. The studio's RADtv, a virtual reality game involving hotseat multiplayer, was released in August 2019.

=== Acquisition by Rockstar Games (2019–present) ===
In October 2019, Ruffian Games was announced as working with Rockstar Games on games that were not further specified. Take-Two Interactive, Rockstar Games's parent company, acquired Ruffian Games in October 2020 and integrated it with Rockstar Games as Rockstar Dundee. At the time, the studio had approximately 40 employees. Liddon and Thomson remained with Rockstar Dundee as co-studio directors. Following the acqusition, the studio worked alongside other Rockstar Games studios on Grand Theft Auto VI, released in November 2026.

== Games developed ==
List of games developed by Rockstar Dundee
Year	Title	Platform(s)	Publisher(s)	Ref.
2010	Crackdown 2	Xbox 360	Microsoft Studios	
2012	Kinect PlayFit	Xbox 360	Microsoft Studios	
2017	Fragmental	Windows	Ruffian Games	
2019	RADtv	Windows	Ruffian Games	
2026	Grand Theft Auto VI	PlayStation 5, Xbox Series X/S	Rockstar Games	

=== Additional work ===
List of games supportively developed by Rockstar Dundee
Year	Title	Lead developer(s)	Platform(s)	Publisher(s)	Notes	Ref.
2012	Kinect Star Wars	Terminal Reality	Xbox 360	Microsoft Studios		
2012	Nike+ Kinect Training	Sumo Digital	Xbox 360	Microsoft Studios		
2013	Kinect Sesame Street TV (season 2)	Soho Productions	Xbox 360	Microsoft Studios		
2014	Kinect Sports Rivals	Rare	Xbox One	Microsoft Studios		
2014	Halo: The Master Chief Collection	343 Industries	Windows, Xbox One, Xbox Series X/S	Microsoft Studios	Ported Halo 3, Halo 3: ODST, Halo 4, and Halo: Reach	
2019	Crackdown 3	Sumo Digital	Windows, Xbox One	Microsoft Studios	Developed the Wrecking Zone multiplayer mode; credited as Elbow Rocket	

=== Cancelled ===
- Streets of Rage
- Tribal Towers / Game of Glens
- Hollowpoint
