= Cloudgine =

British video game developer

Cloudgine Limited
- Type: Subsidiary
- Industry: Video games
- Founded: 2012; 14 years ago
- Founders: Dave Jones; Maurizio Sciglio; Marco Anastasi
- Headquarters: Edinburgh, Scotland
- Key people: Dave Jones (president); Maurizio Sciglio (CEO); Marco Anastasi (CTO)
- Parent: Epic Games (2018–present)
- Website: cloudgine.com

Cloudgine Limited was a British video game developer based in Edinburgh. Founded in 2012 by Dave Jones, it focuses on cloud technologies for video games. It was acquired by Epic Games in 2018 and integrated.

== History ==
Cloudgine was founded in 2012 by Dave Jones, best known as the co-creator of the Grand Theft Auto and Crackdown video game series, Maurizio Sciglio and Marco Anastasi. All three were previously employed by Realtime Worlds and worked on APB: All Points Bulletin (2010), of which Jones as creative director. Cloudgine prioritises on real-time cloud computing technologies, which can be integrated into video games to allow complex calculations to be executed on inferior hardware.

Their first game, Crackdown 3, was announced by Microsoft Studios at the June 2014 Electronic Entertainment Expo. Bearing the working title Crackdown, the game was announced to release for Xbox One at an unspecified date. Although the game was later scheduled for a 2016 release, it had been delayed into February 2019, and was additionally released on Microsoft Windows. The game makes extensive use of Cloudgine's proprietary cloud computing technology, which they claim makes the game able to process physics calculations thirteen times as fast as with a standard Xbox One. Meanwhile, Oculus Studios released the Cloudgine-developed freeware Oculus Touch game Toybox in December 2016.

In January 2018, it was announced that Cloudgine had been acquired by Epic Games for an undisclosed sum. Epic Games plans to natively integrate Cloudgine's technology into their game engine, Unreal Engine.

== Games developed ==
Year	Title	Platform(s)	Publisher(s)	Notes
2016	Toybox	Microsoft Windows	Oculus Studios	For Oculus Rift devices with the Oculus Touch controllers
2019	Crackdown 3	Microsoft Windows, Xbox One	Microsoft Studios	Co-developed the campaign with Sumo Digital and Reagent Games
