= K2 Network =

American video games producer and publisher

K2 Network, Inc. was an American producer and publisher of video games based in Irvine, California. It pioneered the use of the free-to-play (or "freemium") business model among North American and European MMO game publishers in 2004.

On July 5, 2012, the company merged with Reloaded Games, and the merged entity ceased its K2 Network branded operations.

== History ==
K2 Network was founded in 2001 on the belief that "the community experience of Massively Multiplayer Online Games (MMOGs) will become one of the most significant forms of entertainment in the 21st century." The company initially licensed games created by Korean development studios, and localized and serviced those games in North America, South America and Europe via its portal GamersFirst.com. In 2007, the company raised US$16m in a Series-B financing round led by Intel Capital.

=== Licensed MMOs ===
K2 Network's licensed titles included Knight Online World for which it acquired the Western territory rights in 2003 and began publishing operations in 2004, ceasing operations in May 2012. The game grew quickly to more than 40,000 concurrent players and proved especially popular in Turkey where K2 Network monetized the game using its network of ESN code resellers. K2 Network also licensed and published MU Online, War Rock and Sword 2.

=== Creation of Studio Subsidiary Reloaded Productions ===
In November 2010, K2 Network's subsidiary Reloaded Productions purchased the rights to APB: All Points Bulletin from Realtime Worlds during the latter company's administration proceedings for a fraction of the game's original 60 million GBP development cost, aiming to convert the game from a traditional subscription based business model as designed by Realtime Worlds, to a game called APB: Reloaded using the company's free-to-play model. In June 2011, Reloaded Productions acquired Fallen Earth from Icarus Studios planning to repeat the subscription-to-freemium business model conversion.

On March 16, 2015, Reloaded Productions purchased the rights to Hawken.
