= Crackdown (video game series) =

Published by Xbox Game Studios

- Genres: Third-person shooter, action-adventure
- Developers: Realtime Worlds; Ruffian Games; Sumo Digital
- Publisher: Xbox Game Studios
- Creator: David Jones
- Platforms: Xbox 360, Xbox One, Microsoft Windows
- First release: Crackdown; 20 February 2007
- Latest release: Crackdown 3; 15 February 2019

Crackdown is a series of open world action-adventure video games created by David Jones and published by Xbox Game Studios. The series takes place in futuristic dystopian cities controlled and enforced by a law enforcement organization called the Agency. The games center on the Agency's supersoldiers, known as "Agents", as they fight threats ranging from various criminal syndicates, a terrorist group known as "Cell", zombie-like monsters called "Freaks", and a powerful megacorporation known as TerraNova.

Games of the series have been developed by various game developers, with the first game, Crackdown, completed by Realtime Worlds on February 20, 2007, and a sequel titled Crackdown 2 developed by Ruffian Games on July 6, 2010. Both games were released for the Xbox 360. A third installment, Crackdown 3 developed by Sumo Digital, was released on February 15, 2019, for the Xbox One and Microsoft Windows. Critics praised the sandbox-style third-person shooters for allowing the ability to cause massive destruction in a non-linear gameplay, garnering mostly positive reception and commercial success, and becoming an influential series in the sandbox superhero genre.

== Titles ==
Release timeline
2007	Crackdown
2008
2009
2010	Crackdown 2
2011
2012
2013
2014
2015
2016
2017
2018
2019	Crackdown 3

=== Crackdown ===
Crackdown takes place in Pacific City, a dystopian metropolis that is suffering from an increase in crime rate. Criminal syndicates - namely Los Muertos, The Volk, and The Shai-Gen Corporation - have taken control of its three main territories, and they are armed with military-grade weapons that make it difficult for law enforcement to combat them. A secret organization known as the Agency took it upon themselves to eliminate the city's organized crime using their wide resources and genetically modified human beings called Agents. The Agent successfully brought down each criminal syndicate but it was later found out that it was the Agency itself who supplied the criminals with weapons. They planned for the city to go down in anarchy so that they can step in, stop the criminals, and be hailed heroes when they take over.

=== Crackdown 2 ===
The sequel takes place 10 years after the events of the first game. While organized crime has been quelled in Pacific City, a terrorist group calling themselves 'Cell' started a revolt to overthrow the Agency, which has taken control of the city. Cell's leader and former Agency scientist, named Catalina Thorne, released a deadly strain of the "Freak" virus that infected many citizens and turned them into mindless zombie-like monsters called Freaks. The Agency tried to stop this epidemic by building Project Sunburst, a weapon that used sunlight to destroy Freaks. However, Cell took control of Project Sunburst's generators before the Agency could use the weapon. This forced the Agency to send out their newest and better-equipped Agent to combat both the terrorists and the Freaks.

=== Crackdown 3 ===
The third game takes place a decade after Crackdown 2, and features a new city called New Providence, new supporting casts, and Agents with actual names and personalities, including Commander Isaiah Jaxon (played by Terry Crews). Crackdown 3 sees the Agency faced with a new, more technologically advanced and capitalistic adversary called TerraNova, who had taken over New Providence. Their first foray into the city ended in near-disaster after TerraNova anticipated their arrival with an ambush. The surviving Agents were then forced to ally with a rebel group known as Militia, specifically their tough young member named Echo. A combined assault by the Agency and the Militia led to a grand final battle involving the leader of TerraNova, Elizabeth Niemand, piloting a giant mechanized dragon.

== Development ==
With the intent of going beyond the sandbox gameplay made popular by Grand Theft Auto III, developer Realtime Studios spent time with various testers, as well as former developers from the Grand Theft Auto series, in experimenting and refining the genre, with the use of additional content, items and rewards. Crackdown was released on February 20, 2007, for the Xbox 360 console. Originally in development for the Xbox console in 2002, Microsoft suggested in 2004 that Realtime Worlds release the game for the then-upcoming Xbox 360. A demo was showcased at the 2006 E3 Convention. Due to the waving interest in player testers during the game's late development, Microsoft decided to release it with access codes to the Halo 3 multiplayer beta to help its sales during release.

Although Realtime Worlds confirmed that they would create a series to follow the success of the first Crackdown, delays with budgeting between Microsoft and Realtime resulted in the developer cancelling the sequel. Microsoft still owned the intellectual property of Crackdown, and they hired fellow Scottish development company Ruffian Games - who had members with previous experience in Realtime Worlds developing the first game - to make the sequel. A trailer for Crackdown 2 was released at the 2009 E3 Conference. A third game was developed by Sumo Digital, with directions from the original game's creator David Jones and assistance from previous developer Ruffian Games. The game was revealed as Crackdown 3 during Microsoft's Gamescom 2015 press conference on August 4, 2015. The game was originally set to be released for Xbox One and Microsoft Windows on November 7, 2017, but was delayed to 2019. Creative director Ken Lobb asserted that the game will be set in the future of the first game but represents an alternate timeline from what Crackdown 2 provided, though this was changed prior to release.

One of the major elements advertised by David Jones for Crackdown 3 was the inclusion of a near-indestructible multiplayer map mode known as the Wrecking Zone. Half-way into development, however, Jones departed the project for Epic Games, pulling out said element and using it for the game Fortnite, much to the dismay of fans and other interested consumers. Besides Jones, original developing teams Cloudgine and Reagent Games also left the game. These controversial changes hounded Crackdown 3 and resulted in multiple delays from an original 2016 release, to 2017, again to 2018, and a final release on 2019. Many critics noted on this abandonment and missed opportunity, including editor Alex Donaldson from gaming site VG247, stating, "It's a neutered delivery of the promises made far too early in this console generation when, for a moment, it looked like it could be something truly revolutionary."

== Common elements ==
=== Gameplay ===
In each game, players assume the role of super-powered law enforcers called Agents who protect Pacific City with the use of high-tech vehicles and weapons. Players can choose different races and armors for their Agents. Using a third-person camera, the Agent can dispatch enemies by shooting them with firearms, blowing them up with explosives, or engaging in melee combat. Being a genetically enhanced human being gives the Agent various skills, namely "Strength" (punching and lifting power), "Agility" (jumping and movement speed), "Driving" (handling vehicles), "Explosives" (creating explosions), and "Firearms" (shooting ability). These skills can be upgraded by collecting specific orbs or killing enemies. Agents are also covered in high-tech armors with rechargeable shields, which also evolve and unlock additional abilities such as shockwave creation and flight.

The player can also enjoy various minigames such as on-foot and vehicle racing as well as street and aerial stunts. Multiplayer is also available in every game and uses the same gameplay elements in single-player. The first Crackdown game offered players cooperative gameplay of up to 2 players. The second Crackdown game improved the coop mode to accommodate 4 players while also adding new modes such as Rocket Tag, Vehicle Tag, Capture the Orb, Deathmatch, and Team Deathmatch. Crackdown 3 further expanded the series' coop by allowing over 8 players to participate.

=== Graphics ===
The series is known for its artistic use of cel-shading visuals together with its rich color palettes, stylized ambience, and crisp and strong real-time shadows. Developer Realtime Worlds was heavily influenced by comic books in creating the first Crackdown game and they used highlighted ink-like outlines to give it a comic feel. The game was also praised for its use of large draw distances that was seldom seen in other open-world games of its time. Crackdown 2 had a more dilapidated and post-apocalyptic setting but still with the use of the same engine. Ruffian Games used a more advanced crowd system, which allows more NPCs to be in the game while not affecting its play flow. Ruffian further tweaked Crackdown's draw distances by rendering the engine to allow the display of a larger vista of Pacific City. The third installment's New Providence setting offered a more neon-lit futuristic sandbox environment compared to the previous two.

=== Music ===
Each game soundtrack is made up of licensed music from a variety of commercial, independent, and video game musicians. Crackdown's music supervisor Peter Davenport was allowed by Microsoft to select music from any source for the game. Deciding to give it an electronic "dark and ominous" vibe, he selected music from Amon Tobin, Atlas Plug, Celldweller, and Hybrid that he put in each mission and premise. In Crackdown 2, music from Public Enemy, Bob Dylan, Johnny Cash, R.E.M., and Whodini were used to give the game a rebellious feel. The music for the third installment was created by Kristofor Mellroth, the Head of Audio for Microsoft Studios Global Publishing, together with composers Brian Trifon & Brian Lee White of the production group Finishing Move. Their hip-hop inspired work included composing interactive music for the open-world setting, as well as detailed audio physics, and mixing strategies for dialogues and sound effects. The third game also featured a Dolby Atmos soundtrack.

== Other media ==
A webcomic titled the "Pacific City Archives" was also released by Microsoft to accompany the worldwide release of Crackdown 2. Containing over 5 episodes, the webcomic series bridged the gap between the first and second Crackdown games by expanding character backstory and game lore. The Agent is also an unlockable character in the Xbox Live Arcade game Perfect Dark.

Dynamite Comics released a four-issue comic book tie-in to Crackdown 3, simply entitled Crackdown, in May 2019. The series was written by Jonathan Goff and drawn by Ricardo Jaime. It tells the story of several Agents sent to pacify a city riddled with crime and violence, with the team losing members in every issue, before ultimately meeting their objectives.

Besides comics, the series was also included or mentioned in several literature. The games were cited in the non-fiction book "The Post-9/11 Video Game: A Critical Examination" by Marc A. Ouellette and Jason C. Thompson. The series was also mentioned in another non-fiction videogame-themed book entitled "Games' Most Wanted: The Top 10 Book of Players, Pawns, and Power-ups" by Ben H. Rome.

== Legacy ==
The first game was both a critical and commercial success, becoming the top-selling game of February 22, 2007, during its first release week in North America, Japan, and the UK. The game was the top-selling game in North America for the month of February 2007, selling 427,000 units. Ultimately, by the end of 2007, the game sold 1.5 million copies worldwide. The game also won numerous awards such as the "Best Action and Adventure Game" and "Best Use of Audio" in the 2007 BAFTA, "Best Debut" award at the 2008 Game Developers Choice Awards, and the Innovation Award at the 2007 Develop Magazine Awards. Game Informer listed it as one of the top 50 games of 2007, citing its unique experience and several other elements, as well as listing the Agents as the number eight "Top Heroes of 2007" and listing climbing the tallest building in the city as the number nine "Top Moment of 2007."

=== Influence on other games ===
Various video game websites considered the Crackdown series as one of the best open-world video games to date. Ron Whitaker from The Escapist included it in its "8 Awesome Open World Games" list, stating that "open world games have improved a lot since then, but Crackdown is still a stellar example of the genre." Game Journalist James Alexander Callum from Pixel Bedlam dubbed Crackdown as one of the most underrated video games of all time, adding also that the game was "more than just a Grand Theft Auto clone on steroids." On the other hand, Ritwik Mitra of Game Rant ranked Crackdown 2 at #7 in his "Best Open-World Games Where Players Don't Need To Think Too Much", considering it as "the best game in the series".

The games left a large impact on the open-world genre. James Hunt of Den of Geek described the first Crackdown game as "the first in a line of original, postmodern superhero creations on games consoles, and great fun to boot." Its formula of controlling super-powered beings in a massive sandbox environment, using their abilities to cause mayhem and destruction, as well as collecting orbs in an open world environment to increase a character's abilities, have influenced other video game series such as Infamous, Prototype, Saints Row, The Saboteur, and Just Cause 2. Keiichiro Toyama cited Crackdown as a big influence in developing his award-winning game Gravity Rush, stating that he "really liked the aspect of unlocking skills and becoming more powerful, and achieving a higher level of freedom as you become more powerful".

=== Disappointing sequels ===
While the first game was highly praised for its innovation, Crackdown 2 and Crackdown 3 were considered to be one of the most disappointing sequels in video game history. James Stephanie Sterling, during their time at Destructoid, reviewed the second game and called it "the most pointless, unnecessary, and insulting "sequels" ever created." John Almond from Geek Zite ranked Crackdown 2 at #5 in his list of most disappointing video game sequels, stating, "[It] was panned by critics and consumers because of missing gameplay features from the first game like transforming cars, strategy-building in taking out targets, unique weapons like invisibility, and simply being able to aim a sniper rifle through a scope. Making it worse was the reusage of the first game's engine and setting, making Crackdown 2 feel more like an expansion pack than a sequel."

The third game was met with even larger disappointment. Super Philip of PC Gamer added the third installment in his own "Most Disappointing Video Game Sequels" list, describing its release as a "miracle" and adding, "[It] was in the making for so long and the end result is so similar to past games. What was deemed fresh and modern back when Crackdown originally released isn't so much in the present, over a decade later." Christopher Byrd of The Washington Post called it a "remnant from another console-era, a time in which open-world games were still a novelty". He further stated, "Arranged about the neon city of New Providence, where the game is set, are communication towers to scale, many enemy operations to assault, an unmemorable pack of bosses to kill and some side activities to participate in. None of these activities are particularly different than those found in any number of games."
