= David Jones (video game developer) =

Scottish video game designer (born 1965)

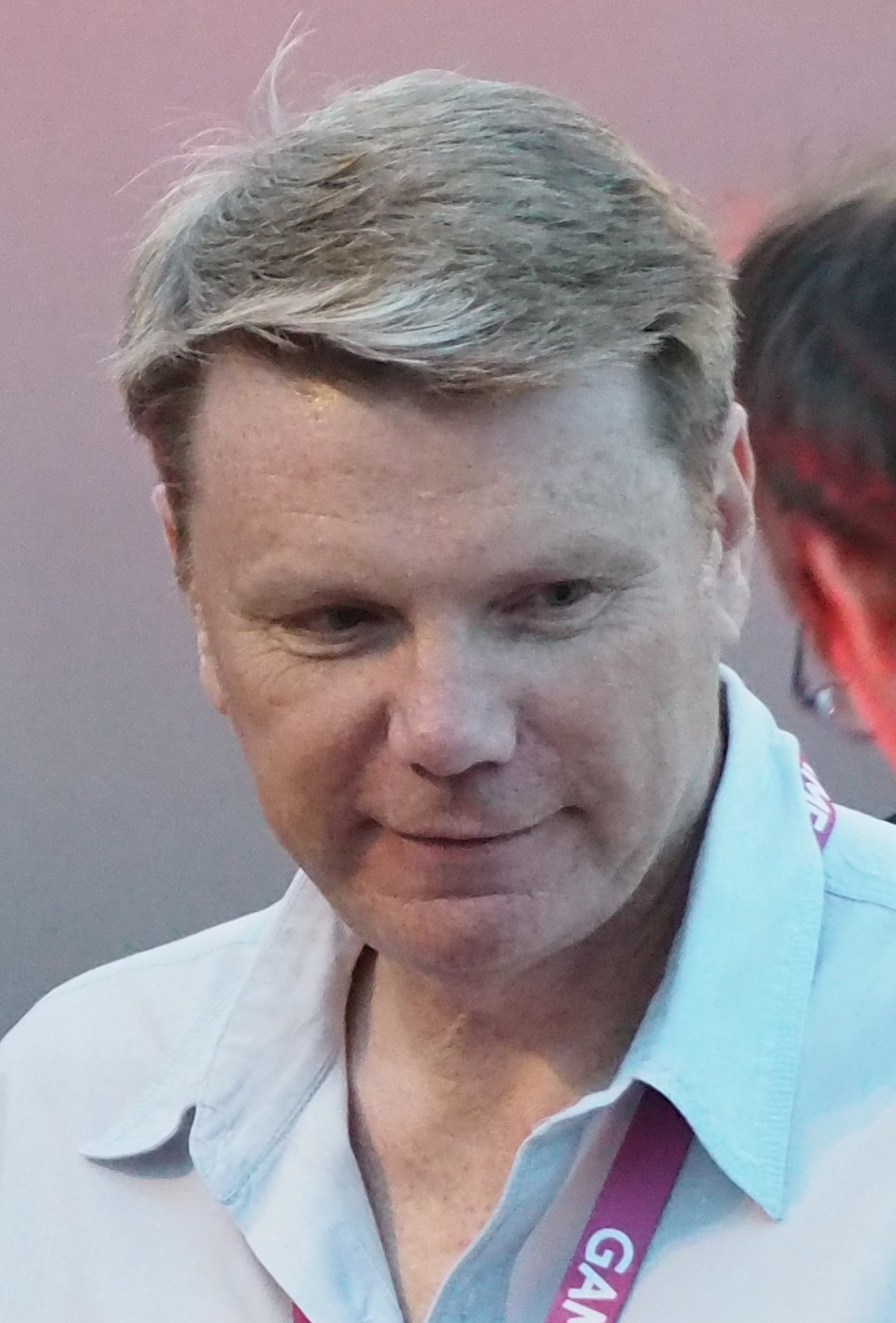
- Jones at Gamelab in 2018
- Born: David Scott Jones; October 1965 (age 61); Dundee, Scotland
- Education: University of Abertay Dundee
- Occupation: Video game designer
- Known for: Lemmings, Grand Theft Auto, Crackdown
- Children: 1

David Scott Jones (born October 1965) is a Scottish video game programmer and entrepreneur who founded video game developers DMA Design (now Rockstar North) in 1988, Realtime Worlds in 2002, and Cloudgine in 2012. Jones created Lemmings and Grand Theft Auto, which both spawned many successful sequels. He also created the Crackdown franchise for the Xbox 360 and Xbox One consoles, and the open-ended massively multiplayer online game APB: All Points Bulletin.

In 2009, he was chosen by IGN as one of the top 100 game creators of all time.

== Biography ==
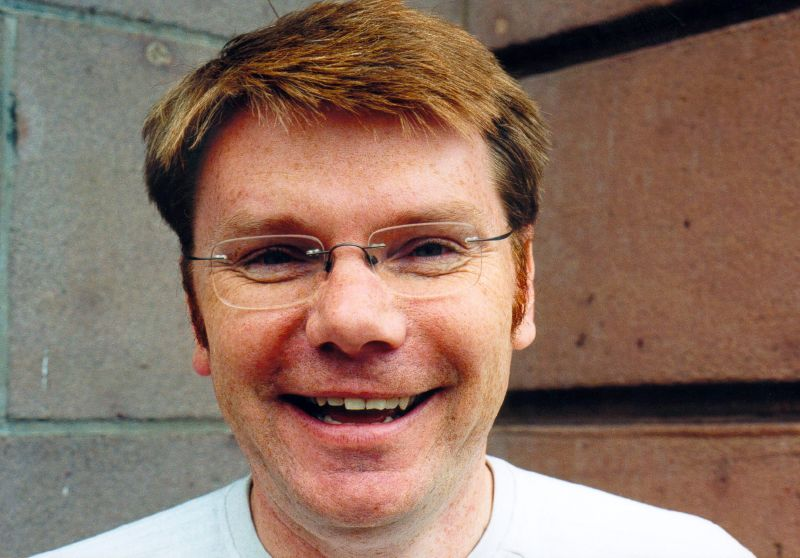
Jones in 2003

David Scott Jones was born in Dundee in October 1965. His career in the video game industry began after he was made redundant from the Timex factory in Dundee, using the severance pay towards an Amiga 1000 computer with which he developed indie game Menace, released under the company name DMA Design in 1988. The company later hired his friends Russell Kay, Steve Hammond and Mike Dailly. Released in 1988, the game sold 15,000 copies and earned him £20,000, which he used to buy a car. DMA Design expanded and went on to make a second game, Blood Money, which Jones saw as a "further development" of the concept used in Menace. DMA created a third game in 1991, Lemmings, which was commercially and critically successful, resulting in awards including winning European Game of the Year twice. Over the next two years Lemmings sold over 2 million copies.

DMA Design created several more games over the next few years, but Jones spent time on developing an idea for a fighting simulator set in a city; after the release of Syndicate Wars (1996), the company revised the concept to set it in a "living city" and cross it with a driving game, resulting in the successful and controversial Grand Theft Auto, which in turn sparked an entire franchise. In 2012 Jones revealed that much of the controversy surrounding Grand Theft Auto was engineered by their publicist, Max Clifford. DMA Design was soon after acquired by Gremlin Interactive, starting a chain of purchases that resulted in the studio becoming Rockstar North. Jones stayed with the company through 1999 and Grand Theft Auto 2 before leaving.

In 2000 Jones founded and led the Dundee studio of Rage Software, Rage Games (Scotland) Limited, where he developed the PC title Mobile Forces. Jones also co-founded Denki who developed Go Go Beckham for Rage. Rage ceased trading after bankruptcy.

In 2002 Jones founded Realtime Worlds, who developed Crackdown (2007) and APB: All Points Bulletin (2010). Despite receiving funding of $100 million Realtime Worlds entered liquidation in 2010 after the disappointing critical and commercial reception to APB.

Jones was the keynote speaker for the World Cyber Games in 2004 where he said that he considered mainstream multiplatform gaming to be the next big thing, and for the 2009 Develop Conference in Brighton.

In 2012 David Jones started work on ChronoBlade, a Facebook action-RPG game, with Stieg Hedlund as part of San Francisco-based development team nWay.

In 2012 he co-founded Cloudgine, a games development company focusing on cloud computing.

In the same year Jones founded Reagent Games, serving as Creative Director, to lead the development of Microsoft Xbox One title Crackdown 3.

In December 2017, Cloudgine was acquired by Epic Games; with this, Jones became Director, Cloud Strategy for Epic Games, and resigned from Reagent Games.

== Works ==
- Menace (1988)
- Blood Money (1989)
- Lemmings (1991)
- Oh No! More Lemmings (1991)
- Lemmings 2: The Tribes (1993)
- Holiday Lemmings (1993)
- Hired Guns (1993)
- The Lemmings Chronicles (1994)
- Grand Theft Auto (1997)
- Body Harvest (1998)
- Space Station Silicon Valley (1998)
- Tanktics (1999)
- Grand Theft Auto 2 (1999)
- Mobile Forces (2002)
- Crackdown (2007)
- APB: All Points Bulletin (2010)
- Crackdown 3 (2019)
