= Closers =

2014 video game

- Developer: Naddic Games
- Publishers: KOR: Nexon; WW: Naddic Games
- Platforms: Microsoft Windows; Android; iOS
- Release: KOR: December 30, 2014; US: November 7, 2017 (Closed Beta)
- Genre: MMORPG
- Mode: Multiplayer

Closers (Korean: 클로저스) is a free-to-play 3D MMORPG developed by Naddic Games and published by Nexon in South Korea with Naddic Games self-published the game worldwide.

In August 2017, En Masse Entertainment announced that is launching the game in North America and Europe. Closed alpha tests began in September, with closed beta launched in November.

Due to En Masse Entertainment ceasing operations, the publishing rights of the game in North America and Europe was transferred to the developer, and on November 5, 2020, the server was relaunched as the global server for Closers.

On May 20th, 2026, Closers announced its end of service on June 24, 2026. On August 25th, 2026, Closers officially relaunched under publisher Papaya Play.

== Plot ==
Closers is set in the Year is 2020, The Place, Seoul. After the invading dimensional monsters were beaten back, Seoul was rebuilt. Mysterious dimensional gates opened all over the planet and unleashed a worldwide invasion of dimensional monsters and aliens. No monsters and tactics had any effect on the waves of dimensional monsters pouring out of the dimensional gates. City after city was mercilessly destroyed. But the opening of the dimensional gates did not only cause damage and destruction. The psychokinetic power that it awoke also enabled a tiny minority of humans to gain extraordinary psychic powers. With these psychic warriors, governments around the world were able to turn the tide of the war with these monsters. After unspeakable losses, the people of earth at least succeeded in closing the gates. Since they had closed the gates, these psychics began to be called "CLOSERS," and the invasion of the dimensional monsters was named the First Dimensional War. With the dimensional monsters vanquished, peace returned to the world, and the cities were rebuilt. Through dedicated research into the dimensional gates and psychokinetic power, humans learned that the gates open when there is a singularity in this mysterious power. However, their understanding of the gates was still incomplete. The CLOSERS who survived the First Dimensional War became part of an organization called UNION. Together, they researched the psychokinetic power in all over the world, working to prevent another dimensional war. And that's when the dimensional gates all over the world started shaking again - as ever stronger outbreed creatures renewed the attack on earth."

== Characters ==
=== Black Lambs ===
- Seha Lee: A lonely striker-class Closer who plays games. His mother was a legendary Alpha Queen Closer.
- Seulbi Lee: A caster-class Closer and leader of Black Lambs who lost her parents by dimensional monsters.
- Seo Yuri: A genki ranger-class Closer and a kendo champion.
- J: A fighter-class Closer.
- Misteltein: A fun-loving lancer-class Closer.

=== Wolf Dogs ===
- Nata: A hunter-class Closer.
- Levia: A timid witch-class Closer.
- Harpy: A rogue-class Closer and a former thief.
- Tina: A serene robotic arms-class Closer.
- Violet: A lavish, tsundere valkyrie-class Closer after her father passed.

=== Wildhüter ===
- Wolfgang Schneider: A librarian-class Closer.
- Luna Aegis: An aegis-class Closer.
- Soma: An ungainly, joyous astra-class Closer.
- Bai Winchester: A stoic mystic-class Closer who wields an icy sword after losing her twin sister due to an accident.
- Seth: A dangerous beast-class Closer who wields two claws.

=== UNION ===
- Euni Song: Commander of the Special Police Battalion.
- Chae Min-woo: Euni's right-hand man.
- Lan Sunwoo: A calm, but craziest UNION biker who transports Closers.
- Yujeong Kim: UNION agent management for the Black Lamb team.
- Bitna Lee: UNION technologist.
- David Lee: Director of UNION.
