= Hawken (video game) =

2012 video game

- Developers: Adhesive Games (Note: Studio gone defunct); Hawken Entertainment, Inc.
- Publishers: Meteor Entertainment (Note: Studio gone defunct); 505 Games
- Producer: Jason Hughes
- Designers: Khang Le; Christopher Lalli; John Park
- Engine: Unreal Engine 3
- Platforms: Microsoft Windows (Note: Closed as of January 2, 2018); PlayStation 4 Xbox One
- Release: Microsoft Windows; December 12, 2012; Xbox One; July 1, 2016; PlayStation 4; July 8, 2016
- Genres: Vehicular combat, first-person shooter
- Mode: Multiplayer

Hawken is a free-to-play multiplayer mech first-person shooter video game. The game features five game modes: Team Deathmatch, Deathmatch, Co-op Bot Team Deathmatch, Siege, and Missile Assault. It follows the freemium model of game monetization, where in-game purchases are the main source of revenue.

Hawken had closed alpha and beta programs that took place before the official PC open beta release on December 12, 2012. The game had been constantly updated with new content and balance changes in the form of a game patch until spring 2014. Following Reloaded Games' acquisition of the game's IP and assets in March 2015, the developers launched the game on console platforms in early July 2016.

On October 2, 2017, the developers announced that the PC servers would be permanently shut down on January 2, 2018. The developers cited a need to "refocus [their] development efforts." The game is still active on consoles, being developed by Hawken Entertainment and published by 505 Games.

In 2020, a group of fans revived the PC release in offline mode, with future plans for multiplayer support, under the project title "Hawakening."

On May 17, 2023, a sequel titled Hawken Reborn by 505 Games entered into Steam Early Access.

== Gameplay ==
Hawken promotional image

Hawken is a mech-based first-person shooter. The game takes place in a dystopian human-colonized planet industrialized to the point of collapse, in which the hunt for resources has become a battle for survival. The player assumes the role of a pilot within a biped battle mech—armed with a variety of ballistic cannons and missile weaponry. Relatively agile, these machines are equipped with booster jets that allow them to travel faster and hover in short jumps.

Unlike many other first-person shooters, weapons have unlimited ammunition, but are prone to overheating during sustained fire. Overheating will shut down all weapons of the mech, forcing the player to find a safe place to recover. Players can choose alternate weapons, equipment and upgrades for all mech types to match a playstyle or to fill a specific role for a team. In combat, the player will be able to side dash, boost, and make 180 degree turns to compensate for the slow movement of the mech—which in turn will deplete the recharging fuel gauge.

Hawken consists of ten playable maps: Bazaar, Bunker, Facility, Front Line, Highways, Last Eco, Origin, Prosk, Uptown, and Wreckage. There are a total of three different game modes available to the player: Team Deathmatch, Deathmatch, and Co-op Team Deathmatch. At one point there was a fourth game mode where you and your team have to charge up a rocket to escape before the other team. There also exists an exploration mode, in which the player is able to freely explore any map in the game. This mode is single-player only, and there is no combat. In addition, the player has the option of switching in-game from first-person to third-person view, and can respawn as a different mech.

=== Mechs ===
Hawken offers three different mech types (colloquially known as "Generation 1", or G1): A-class, B-class, and C-class. Following the game's lore, mechs are called an "axe".

A-class type mechs, also known as "light mechs", are very agile, but have weak armor. B-class type mechs are well rounded mechs that have balanced armor and speed. C-class type mechs, also known as "heavy mechs", have high armor, but are slower in speed. Each mech has a unique ability that can be activated for additional damage, protection, or utility. Some mechs have passive abilities that are always active, and requires no activation. Players head to the garage to fully customize their mechs.

Previous game producer Jason Hughes, from Adhesive Games, had introduced a new type of mech, called "Generation 2," or G2. These mechs were a complete redesign of their predecessors (G1). G2 mechs featured different stats, weapons, and chassis. During this time, there were only two available G2 mechs prior to Patch version 1.6.0 (known as post-console update).

After the release to consoles, Reloaded Games had reworked the approach to the G2 evolution. Instead of becoming different mechs altogether, the G2 variants have become slightly stronger and faster. Additionally, G2 mechs have a unique mech skin akin to the looks and design of carbon fiber.

=== Energy Units ===
Energy Units (EU) are only encountered in Siege mode and Co-op Mode, where players collect EU from EU base stations and from player dropped EU orbs. The game features EU tanks on the user interface that correspond to the total amount of EU a player possesses. In co-op mode, EU is used to upgrade armor, cooling, and the damage of weapons.

If a destroyed mech was carrying EU, that amount is dropped where they have died, and forms into a green EU orb; at which point it can then be collected by other players. The maximum amount of EU a mech can carry varies with its class type. A-class mechs carry less, whereas C-class mechs carry more.

=== Level Progression System ===
Hawken features a level progression system that goes up to level 30. As players gain experience (XP points) from playing the game, they begin to level up. Each level brings different rewards in customization, items, and/or XP/HC (Hawken Credits). Once a player reach level 30, the XP points they earn go into a buffer—called "overflow XP"—that allows them to spend in-game credits to level up other mechs in their garage. Additionally, each mech they own has a unique level. The level of a mech determines what they can do with its potential upgrades and customizability.

== Free-to-play ==
Hawken primarily generated revenue from player purchased currency (Mech credits, or MC), which is how the game operated on a free-to-play business model. These mech credits could only be purchased in packages, which range from $5 to $100 USD. Once purchased, the player could spend these credits to unlock any content the game has to offer. This includes every weapon, item, internal, player avatar, mech cosmetic, XP/HC (Experience/Hawken credit) booster, holotaunt, and mech. Reviewers such as Nathan Grayson and Erik Kain criticized the game's freemium concept, with Grayson calling the matchmaking system "basically broken" and Kain saying "[p]ay to win is a death sentence".

== Reception ==
Reception

Aggregate score
Aggregator	Score
Metacritic	PC: 73/100; XONE: 73/100; PS4: 58/100

The PC and Xbox One releases of the game hold a score of 73/100 on Metacritic, and the PlayStation 4 release 58/100. The game's combination of first-person shooter and mecha combat was compared to Shogo: Mobile Armor Division from 1998.

== Film adaptation ==
"They witness an event that suggests there is more to the nano-virus than meets the eye. Now the race is on to discover the virus’ origins and true purpose before their respective clans wipe each other out in a final, climactic battle."

— Dan Jevons, Creative Director

On 24 August 2011 an article on entertainment news website The Wrap was released confirming that DJ2 Entertainment, an independent production company, was able to obtain the rights for a film adaptation. Adhesive Games was hesitant to release the rights at first, opting to focus on the game release instead. "I assumed someone already got it because it was so huge. Big names were chasing this", said DJ2 producer Dmitri M. Johnson, "A-list directors and big hit agencies."

The story will follow two young pilots from separate clans pitted against one another after a devastating virus has covered most of the heavily industrialized planet surface in toxic crystal. There have been no official announcements regarding writers, producers or lead actors for the film at this point, but a panel at Comic-Con 2012 announced Act of Valor director Scott Waugh would be taking the reins on the adaptation.

== Revival ==
In August 2020, it was announced that a group of fans calling themselves Hawakening had revived the PC release.

From September 27, 2024, the Hawakening project went into public beta. The project had a beta relaunch with full custom server support in late 2024. It enabled player versus player multiplayer, and removed any possible microtransaction structure.

== See also ==
- APB: All Points Bulletin
- K2 Network
- MechWarrior Online
