= Crackdown 3 =

2019 video game

- Developer: Sumo Digital (Note: Additional work by Reagent Games, Cloudgine, Sumo India, Double Eleven and Climax Studios. Ruffian Games (credited as Elbow Rocket) developed the multiplayer mode in partnership with Certain Affinity.)
- Publisher: Microsoft Studios
- Producer: Steven Zalud
- Designer: Gareth Wilson
- Programmers: Stephen Robinson; Craig Wright; Antony Crowther; Philip Rankin
- Artists: Kelvin Tuite; Richard Jordan
- Writers: Joseph Staten; Philip Lawrence; Gordon Rennie
- Composers: Brian Trifon; Brian Lee White; Jay Wiltzen
- Series: Crackdown
- Engine: Unreal Engine 4
- Platforms: Windows; Xbox One
- Release: 15 February 2019
- Genre: Action-adventure
- Modes: Single-player, multiplayer

Crackdown 3 is a 2019 action-adventure game developed by Sumo Digital and published by Microsoft Studios for Windows and Xbox One. It continues the series nearly nine years after the release of 2010's Xbox 360 video game Crackdown 2. Originally set to be released in 2016, the game was delayed a number of times. Crackdown 3 was released on 15 February 2019 and received mixed reviews from critics, who praised the return of its core features from its predecessors and level of enjoyment, but was also criticized for a lack of innovation and dated design.

== Gameplay ==
Crackdown 3 retains the core gameplay of Crackdown and Crackdown 2, featuring a number of different organizations controlling the city of New Providence that players need to take down by killing their bosses and Kingpins, destroying their facilities, and destabilizing their infrastructures. Players can use a variety of weapons to achieve this end, from guns to grenades to rocket launchers, as well as their own physical power. Players can also drive any vehicle found in-game. Picking up a new weapon or driving a new vehicle for the first time will add it to the player's collection at any supply point. The game features the "Skills for Kills" system as found in previous games, in which killing enemies with different tools and finding pickups hidden throughout the city award the player with orbs, which increase the player's core skills – agility, firearms, strength, explosives, and driving. Each time a skill levels up, the player unlocks an additional maneuver or item related to that skill, such as ground-pounding by leveling up strength, or double-jumping by leveling up agility. Agility Orbs, Rooftop Races, Driving Rings, and Road Races are also located throughout the city, all of which will increase the related skill upon collection or completion; Hidden Orbs can be found as well, and will increase all of the player's skills at once.

Different activities are connected to different bosses and underbosses; completing these activities, such as destroying vehicle lockups, liberating monorail stations, and destroying machinery, allows the player to acquire more intel on each boss, and the boss location is revealed on the map once enough intel has been collected. The boss of each branch of TerraNova controls a certain element of defense for the final boss, and killing each of them weakens an aspect of the final boss's fortress. However, causing a certain level of chaos towards one branch of the organization will send more and more reinforcements from that branch as the player's heat level increases, and being at the highest level for too long can result in a city-wide lockdown, forcing the player to kill a certain number of reinforcements to lift it and access their supply points again.

Crackdown 3 features cooperative play in both campaign mode and Keys to the City mode, which allows free roam throughout New Providence.

=== Crackdown 3: Wrecking Zone ===
Another new element to the series is the inclusion of destructible environments in a competitive multiplayer mode, Wrecking Zone, in which nearly the entire map is destructible. However, the mode was quickly abandoned. Wrecking Zone has since been described as "dead".

== Plot ==
Ten years after the events of Crackdown 2, a massive terrorist attack from an unknown source cuts electrical power around the entire world. The Agency is thrust back into action after the attack is traced to the city of New Providence, controlled by the mysterious but sinister corporation TerraNova, led by Elizabeth Niemand; New Providence is the only city that still has power. The player characters - super-powered Agents - are called into the field by Agency Director Charles Goodwin (Michael McConnohie) and led by Commander Isaiah Jaxon (Terry Crews) to drop into New Providence and dismantle Terra Nova any way they can. As Jaxon briefs the agents of their mission, their drop ship is attacked by TerraNova, resulting in the deaths of everyone on board.

Echo, a member of the New Providence rebel group known as the Militia, recovers the remains of one of the agents and regenerates them. Heavily outnumbered by TerraNova's forces, Echo enlists the agent's help in fighting back by dismantling TerraNova's infrastructure - Logistics, Science, and Enforcement. As the agent fights TerraNova, they discover that the Science branch of TerraNova has been mining a mysterious green mineral called Chimera, which Goodwin deduces is responsible for the power outage - Chimera reportedly consumes electrical power. The agent also investigates the mysterious disappearance of many New Providence citizens, discovering they have been kidnapped by TerraNova in an attempt to brainwash and create an army of genetically enhanced super-soldiers. Audio logs found throughout the game allow the agent to learn the existence of an anonymous client who reportedly paid TerraNova to perform there.

Eventually, the agent assaults Elizabeth Niemand's tower and ascends to the top, where they confront Niemand, who is piloting a massive Chimera-powered dragon mech; Neimand states her desire to use the Vitalis project to make herself immortal. The agent destroys the dragon mech, killing Niemand. In the aftermath, Goodwin offers Echo a position at the Agency, which she accepts. An agent's severed arm suspended in a Vitalis tank is then seen as the voice of the anonymous client addresses the agent, stating that the Agent is the end of the evolution of Chimera.

== Development ==
Crackdown 3 was announced at Microsoft's press conference at the Electronic Entertainment Expo 2014 in June 2014, as an Xbox One exclusive. While the game was still at an early stage at the time of its reveal, Microsoft's Phil Spencer said that the title came about from talks with Dave Jones who, after leaving Realtime Worlds, joined Cloudgine, a software company that is developing technology allowing game developers to take advantage of cloud computing features. Cloudgine had been previously rumored to be a core part of the Xbox One software, with their software used in a technology demonstration at a Microsoft developer's conference in April 2014, demonstrating the use of cloud computing to speed up the physics modeling and rendering in a fully destructible city environment. Spencer revealed that the demo world was the start of this newest Crackdown title, with ability to destroy any part of the city expected to be carried over to the final game. According to Spencer, Cloudgine would help to develop the core engine, while Reagent Games, a studio located in close proximity to Cloudgine also founded by Jones, would develop the gameplay and art assets for the game, with Sumo Digital developing the game's campaign mode and Crackdown 2 developers Ruffian Games (credited as "Elbow Rocket") developing the multiplayer. Microsoft Studios' creative director Ken Lobb asserted that the game would only be called Crackdown instead of Crackdown 3, stating that the game is set in the future of the first game but represents an alternate timeline from what Crackdown 2 provided. However, this was changed in 2019 prior to release, making the third installment take place a decade after the second one.

The game was officially revealed as Crackdown 3 during Microsoft's Gamescom 2015 press conference on 4 August 2015. The focus on cloud-powered real time destruction was first demonstrated there, and Jones stated that Microsoft's cloud computing technology provides twenty times more power than playing the game on a single Xbox One console. Because of the game's reliance to Microsoft Azure for destruction engine, the full scale destruction will only be available in the game's online multiplayer modes, while campaign mode, regardless of number of players, will only have access to limited degree of destruction.

In January 2018, Epic Games acquired Cloudgine, and with that, Jones left Reagent to join Epic Games. Polygon reported at the same time that several Reagent programmers also left to go to Epic. During an interview at E3 2018, Microsoft Studio's Matt Booty stated that Sumo Digital was now the principal developer on Crackdown 3. Jones confirmed that in terms of development, Sumo Digital had always been the principal developer for the game; Cloudgine was there to help support cloud computing, with Reagent established as a consulting firm to allow Jones to help Sumo determine the direction to take Crackdown 3. Jones did not believe there was any stumbling blocks due with Cloudgine, Reagent, or himself leaving the development at that point, since they had done what they had needed for cloud computing support, and considered that now, "it's just the technology stack, it's pretty straightforward" for Sumo to complete. Despite their departures during development, both Cloudgine and Reagent were still credited in the game's packaging and on the end credits.

The game uses Unreal Engine 4 and features a Dolby Atmos soundtrack.

=== Delays ===
Crackdown 3 was set to be released worldwide in 2016, which was changed to 7 November 2017 simultaneously with the Xbox One X, but another delay was announced on 16 August 2017, moving the release back to an unspecified Q2/Q3 2018 date. In June 2018, the game was confirmed to be delayed again, pushing back to February 2019.

== Reception ==
Reception

Aggregate scores
Aggregator	Score
Metacritic	(PC) 54/100 (XONE) 60/100
OpenCritic	18% recommend

Review scores
Publication	Score
Destructoid	6/10
Electronic Gaming Monthly	7/10
Game Informer	6/10
GameRevolution	3/5
GamesRadar+	3/5
Giant Bomb	2/5
IGN	5/10
PC Gamer (US)	60%
VideoGamer.com	6/10

Crackdown 3 received "mixed or average" reviews, according to review aggregator website Metacritic. Fellow review aggregator OpenCritic assessed that the game received weak approval, being recommended by 18% of critics.

IGN noted the lack of innovation stating, "Crackdown 3 delivers on what made the original an enjoyable game, but never much more." Destructoid was also disappointed with the evolution of the series and wrote, "Crackdown 3 is a good Crackdown game, which, unfortunately, doesn't mean much anymore. Modern game design has surpassed the Crackdown model by leaps and bounds". EGMNow wrote of the game, "It's a blast when you just feel like zoning out, hunting orbs, jumping across rooftops, and blowing up bad guys" and closed by saying, "It's good, solid fun, but it's not going to completely revolutionize the industry."

PC Gamer wrote, "Crackdown 3 comes along 12 years after Crackdown but without 12 years' worth of new ideas to share" and finished by saying, "It's an OK game that could've been exciting a decade ago." The Verge referred to Crackdown 3 as "the Netflix Original of games", by stating: "You know when there's a show you really like, but then it dips in quality and eventually gets canceled, and the creators say they want to make a new season someday or maybe a remake, but it's stuck in production hell for several years, then Netflix or whoever sinks a bunch of money into it, and it eventually gets released and it's not quite as good as you remember the original, but it's still pretty entertaining and hey, you're paying for Netflix anyway so you're not going to complain about getting it for 'free?' That's Crackdown 3. It is video game as Netflix Original."
