= Crackdown (video game) =

2007 action-adventure game

- Developer: Realtime Worlds
- Publisher: Microsoft Game Studios
- Director: David Jones
- Producer: Phil Wilson
- Designer: Billy Thomson
- Programmer: Keith R. Hamilton
- Artist: Jeff Cairns
- Writer: Matthew Obst
- Composer: DJ Krush
- Series: Crackdown
- Engine: RenderWare
- Platform: Xbox 360
- Release: NA: 20 February 2007; AU: 22 February 2007; JP: 22 February 2007; EU: 23 February 2007
- Genre: Action-adventure
- Modes: Single-player, multiplayer

Crackdown (Note: Known in Japan as Riot Act) is a 2007 action-adventure game developed by Realtime Worlds and published by Microsoft Game Studios for the Xbox 360. Crackdown was conceived by Realtime Worlds' founder, David Jones, who also created Grand Theft Auto and Lemmings.

Set in the fictional Pacific City, the player controls a biologically enhanced Agent, tasked with defeating three crime lords and their organized crime syndicates. The Agent's abilities improve by defeating both crime lords and their top subordinates, as well as by completing optional activities, such as street races and scavenger hunts. The gameplay is nonlinear: instead of following a rigid mission sequence, players are free to select the approach to completing their missions and activities. The game features a two-player cooperative play mode via Xbox Live. It was released worldwide in February 2007.

Crackdown, initially planned for release on the original Xbox console, was envisioned as a vast world in which players could experiment and explore freely. Microsoft Game Studios bundled specifically marked copies of Crackdown with an access code to the multiplayer test version of the much-anticipated Halo 3 Beta. The game sold 1.5 million copies in its first six months of release. It received critical acclaim from reviewers and is widely considered to be the best entry in the series. It has garnered several awards for its innovative gameplay. A sequel, Crackdown 2, was released in July 2010 by Ruffian Games without Jones' input, and Crackdown 3 was released for the Xbox One and Microsoft Windows in February 2019, initially to be again directed by Jones before he left to join Epic Games.

== Gameplay ==
Crackdown is a third-person shooter set in a sandbox environment, akin to Mercenaries: Playground of Destruction. After selecting one of the predefined Agent characters, the player is assigned to defeat the Kingpin of each gang, though there is no precise approach to do this, leaving players to select their preferred method. While the player may face the Kingpin and his bodyguards at any time, they can improve their chances of taking out the Kingpin by facing and defeating the various Generals responsible for certain aspects of the Kingpin's offense and defense, removing them from play. For example, by eliminating a gang's weapon dealer, gang members will no longer be as heavily armed or will fire fewer shots to conserve ammunition; assassinating the gang recruitment officer similarly reduces the size of the Kingpin's protective force. It is at the player's discretion whether to kill the Generals or skip them entirely before facing the Kingpin. However, the gangs cannot be completely eradicated from the city without tracking down and killing all Generals and Kingpins.

In Crackdown, the Agent can use many super-human powers, including enhanced strength, to defeat his enemies.

Much like other sandbox games, the player uses melee attacks, guns, and explosives to fight the opposing forces, and can run, climb buildings, jump across rooftops, or use vehicles to navigate the city. Crackdown features a series of character-based skills that can be upgraded to increase specific traits that can be used in combat, driving, or on-foot agility. These skills include: "Agility", which increases the Agent's ability to jump, run, and swim; "Driving", affecting how well he can handle a vehicle and upgrades it; "Explosives", which affects the power and range of explosive weapons and explosive power; "Strength" that increases the Agent's strength, namely by increasing his ability to lift and throw, as well as how hard he can strike an opponent and increases health; and "Firearms", which improves the character's aptitude with weapons. Crackdown's skills make few concessions to realism: character abilities are similar to those of comic book superheroes or cartoon characters. This concept is further highlighted by the ink-like outlines drawn around in-game characters.

Skills are usually improved by gaining experience orbs, which are released from defeated enemies. The type of orb released varies, depending on how the player dispatched the foe; for instance, killing an enemy with a gun will earn Firearms orbs, while running them over with a vehicle earns Driving orbs. More powerful enemies release more experience orbs. However, Agility orbs are awarded differently: they can be earned by either climbing buildings and seeking them on rooftops, or by killing an enemy from a high altitude. The player can also compete in "rooftop races", a race through a series of waypoints across the rooftops of Pacific City, or car races to gain Agility and Driving orbs, respectively. A few special orbs, well-hidden, increase all character abilities when found. A final way to collect orbs is by earning achievements, which rewards the player with orbs from every skill category. Each skill has five levels—beginning with zero stars, and ending with four—with a numeric gauge on the display to indicate how close the player is to the next level. Should the character die, or injure civilians or Agency peacekeepers, their experience gain will be slowed, making it temporarily harder to improve the character's traits.

The entirety of Pacific City may be explored from the start of the game, allowing the player to locate the hideouts of each General and Kingpin, which can be made easier by accessing supply points scattered around the city. Once a supply point is unlocked, the player has the option of returning there to travel to any other supply point, restock on weapons and ammunition, or drop off newly acquired weapons, to permanently add them to their weapon selection. Should the player die, they can respawn at any open supply point. While exploring, the player is likely to come across enemy resistance, with their aggressiveness based on how badly the player has damaged that particular gang recently. If the player is too aggressive against the non-gang residents of Pacific City, including the Peacekeepers, they are flagged as rogue, and Agency hit squads are dispatched to take them down.

Crackdown features an online two-player cooperative play mode that allows drop-in play. Both players may explore the city freely, with the other player's position noted on the HUD map. Players can fight alongside each other, and also inflict friendly-fire damage. The state of the city, including which Generals and Kingpins remain, is determined by the host player's progress. Both players are credited with the defeat of a General or Kingpin in the game—which will affect the state of the guest's progress—but are required to obtain supply points and gain experience independently. Co-op players can race against each other in both rooftop and road races, should they both choose to participate.

== Plot ==
Crackdown takes place in the fictional metropolis of Pacific City, whose three districts are divided among eight total islands. The city is controlled by three criminal organizations: Los Muertos (which means "The Dead" in Spanish), a street gang of drug dealers from Central America who runs "La Mugre" ("The Dirt"); The Volk (Russian for "The Wolf"), a militia group from Eastern Europe who dominates "The Den"; and the Shai-Gen Corporation, a formerly above-board, corrupt governing body from East Asia that rules "The Corridor". Normally, a police organization called the Peacekeepers kept the city under control; their forces, however, were overwhelmed by the sudden rise in crime. The city, therefore, sought additional help from "the Agency", an organization that, in addition to outfitting and supporting Peacekeepers, has used advanced surgical and cybernetic technology to create supersoldiers known as "Agents". The Agency is based out of a former resort hotel on an island in the very centre of the city. The player takes on the role of one of their Agents, and is tasked with systematically bringing down all three organized gangs, while keeping both the populace and Peacekeepers safe. The Agent's actions are continuously monitored by the Agency, and its Director (voiced by Michael McConnohie) provides continuous reports to him of his progress.

Throughout the game, the player roams Pacific City, systematically eliminating the leaders of the three gangs. Upon defeating the gangs' Kingpins and generals, the Agent must put down a final riot by the remaining gang members in the area which after completion will cause that district to be almost crime free. Once all three gangs are fully exterminated, in the closing cutscene of the game, the Director reveals to the Agent that there was an ulterior motive for the Agency's actions: the Agency had secretly empowered the three gangs in the first place to instill fear in Pacific City's residents, thus creating a need for the Agency to control the city, and acceptance in the populace when they did take over. The Agency Director's comments suggest that the Agency was merely using Pacific City as a test and will replicate this plan in other cities across the globe to create a New World Order.

== Development ==
Crackdown was envisioned to exceed the gameplay of Grand Theft Auto, giving the player "toys" to create their own in-game moments that could be verbally shared with others. The Crackdown logo is in the shape of the Agency Tower, modified. The entire playfield was to be open at the start, requiring the need to create a progression for the player, while still allowing for experimentation. Realtime Worlds had hired a number of former Grand Theft Auto developers who experimented with refining the game's sandbox element. "It was a big part of the idea to just let people do things", Realtime Worlds producer Phil Wilson said about the gameplay; "testers would do things we were completely blown away by". Dave Jones, CEO of Realtime Worlds, described the concept of the game as "How do we reward somebody for just having fun?" They had initially planned to have 200 Xbox Live Achievements for the game towards this purpose, exceeded the then-current cap of 50 set by Microsoft, and pressured Microsoft to lift the cap. Microsoft subsequently increased the maximum number of Achievements in a game to 80. Through playtesting, the team noticed that many players performed certain out-of-the-way actions, such as climbing to the top of the Agency Tower. They created in-game content to reward the player for performing these actions; for example, they created a special rendering procedure for the clouds during the in-game day/night cycle. The renderer would behave differently each day, and could only be viewed from atop the Agency Tower. An initial fear of Jones' was that in the early part of the game, when the Agent is underpowered, the player may not realize the potential of the game and would not complete it; "People weren't quite sure, because at that level, you're kind of like most characters in most other games". Jones also expressed concern that "This game does not look good in screenshots". They took two major steps to overcome this. First, the demo for the game on Xbox Marketplace allowed for accelerated growth of the player's abilities. Second, the full game included five in-game movies that would be presented early on to the player that would give them a taste of what a fully powered character could do.

Wilson stated that development of the game began in 2002 with a target release in 2005 on the original Xbox. Nine people were involved in the initial development for twelve months with plans to expand to 35 during full development. By February 2004, they were able to provide a playable demo, but recognized there were still several challenges with the game's progression. For example, the team introduced "skills for kills" where skill points were only rewarded for killing foes instead of allowing the player to gain them by less risky opportunities. They also included the frequent reporting of the player's current chance of success for a player of defeating a Kingpin to prevent the player from being frustrated by trying to fight Kingpins beyond their level.

By 2004, Microsoft brought the team the Xbox 360 hardware and suggested moving the game to that system, with a release date in the spring of 2006. By November 2004, the whole of Pacific City was in place, and cooperative mode was possible. However, in January 2005 they switched to the Renderware 4 engine, which caused many problems and was considered a "gross mistake" by Wilson. Microsoft was able to provide additional programmers to help during 2006 to correct the problems, just in time to create a demo for the 2006 E3 Convention. Wilson admitted that when Crackdown was first unveiled, the team thought the game was too early to debut. "By the time we got to the end of pre-production we were woefully understaffed and over budget", Wilson commented.

Microsoft found that by October 2006, the game had fallen into the bottom 30 percent in test player reaction of all games currently in testing, and the bottom 50 percent in interest, though the numbers improved after a month. To help the struggling game, Microsoft decided to package the Halo 3 multiplayer trial with the game. "It was a great boost", said Wilson. Jones also was positive about the tie-in with the Halo 3 trial; "We kind of knew Crackdown would need as much help as it could get to get into players' hands ... Like we've always said: It's a game player's game. It's not something that's going to sell in screenshot. So [the Halo 3 beta] was good".

A map of Pacific City from Crackdown, demonstrating the sectors used for debugging the game

Pacific City within the game consists of 495 "city blocks" which the player could travel among, according to Microsoft Game Studios' Jami Johns. Each block had to be tested separately, so Microsoft Game Studios designed a software tool to track issues when the game was in testing. For example, the tool was able to identify blocks where the performance dropped or the game crashed, allowing the developers to redesign the area to remove the issues. A further tool was used for the "seams" between city blocks, and included a screenshot just prior to any problem, which significantly reduced the debugging time for the game; this tool was further used with Forza Motorsport 2. However, the team had found some bugs during testing that actually worked well as game mechanics without throwing off the game balance. For example, the ability to drive the Agency SUV up a vertical wall when the player has maxed out his driving skill was originally a bug within the game.

=== Promotion ===
A Crackdown demo was released via Xbox Live Marketplace on 23 January 2007. It was originally dated for 18 January 2007, but was delayed due to Microsoft's certification process. This demo includes both single player and co-op play, but does not allow for jump-in co-op as seen in Gears of War. Silver account members received the demo one week later. The demo lasts for, at most, one hour, with a timer starting when either the player trains a skill to the second level, has eliminated two of the gang Generals, or has been playing for a half-hour. At that point, a 30-minute timer will start, after which the demo automatically ends. During the demo, in-game skills can be trained up to the highest level, and this occurs at an accelerated rate in order to give players an example of higher-level abilities. The Crackdown demo quickly broke download records for Microsoft's Xbox Live Marketplace by becoming the most downloaded demo over a 24-hour period and a seven-day (week-long) period. In the week after its release, the Crackdown demo was the second most played Xbox Live game after Gears of War. The demo went on to become the most downloaded and most played overall by March 2007.

Every pre-ordered and specially marked copy of Crackdown included an invitation to the beta test of the highly anticipated Halo 3. The Crackdown game disc was required to download and launch the Halo 3 beta through the in-game menus. On 10 April 2007, Bungie announced that the beta would become available for download for those that own this copy of Crackdown on 16 May 2007. This beta was playable for three weeks from when it was downloadable.

=== Downloadable content ===
On 19 February 2007, a free downloadable pack was made available for the game. The pack includes four new playable male agents, three of whom have unique, upgradable headgear. A free update was released on 11 May 2007, which allows the player to reset gangs, makes it easier to find orbs, improves stunt ring visibility, enhances targeting and camera angles when driving, and provides several other minor fixes. This update also includes a new ground strike attack.

Two packs of downloadable content were released on 10 May 2007. The "Free-For-All" pack, which is available free, adds a mode called "Keys to the City" to the main menu. It allows the player to impound any vehicle and store it at the Agency and allows the player to enter a "Keys to the City" mode that allows them to alter the Agent's statistics or create several items, and other effects, but disables the unlocking of achievements and saving of progress within the game. The "Gettin' Busy" bonus pack introduced new vehicles, new weapons, new side missions, and a new street racing activity. By September 2007, the "Gettin' Busy" pack had been downloaded from Xbox Live around 200,000 times.

The May 2007 title update and downloadable content were linked to a glitch which reset a number of players' saved games when they played the game's co-operative mode. The developers apologized for the glitch and offered a temporary workaround, however, saved games already lost to the glitch were not recoverable. On 16 May 2007, a further title update was released, resolving the issue, in addition to fixing issues with access to the Halo 3 beta.

After Crackdown 3's release, the downloadable content for Crackdown and the game itself were made available for free.

=== Soundtrack ===
The main theme of the game is "Paradise Bird Theory" by DJ Krush.

Crackdown features over 100 tracks of electronica and sample-based music by a number of mostly obscure independent and video game musicians, with some of the more notable artists including Amon Tobin, Atlas Plug, Celldweller, Hybrid, Molotov, Control Machete, Kinky, and TobyMac. Music supervisor Peter Davenport was in charge of selecting the music for the game, a task that took three years to complete. Davenport was allowed to select music from any source given the premise and missions within the game, and worked with the audio leads at Realtime Worlds to shape the full soundtrack, keeping it to a "dark and ominous" vibe, rather than "super high energy".

== Reception ==
Pacific City, the setting for Crackdown. The Agency Towers can be seen in the left background. The game has been well-received for its long draw distances.

Reception

Aggregate score
Aggregator	Score
Metacritic	83/100

Review scores
Publication	Score
1Up.com	A
Edge	8/10
Electronic Gaming Monthly	8.3/10
Eurogamer	9.0/10
Game Informer	8.5/10
GamePro	4.5/5.0
GameSpot	7.8/10
GameSpy	4/5
IGN	8.0/10
Official Xbox Magazine (US)	9/10
Play	8.5/10
X-Play	5/5

Crackdown received generally favorable reviews by game critics who praised the open-world approach. Reviewers commented highly on the graphics of the game, both in its detailed city and large draw distances, and the cel-like shading of the characters; 1UP said that "it's just better to let a game approach reality on its own aesthetic terms than to go hyperrealistic". X-Play stated, "It's an absolute blast to play, and arguably one of the finest superhero games made thus far", and IGN stated, "Overall the thrill of jumping like a mutant kangaroo from rooftop to rooftop is unrivaled!" The co-op play feature over Xbox Live was well received; Eurogamer wrote, "Being able to pick and leap into any of your friends' or even complete strangers' cities is likely to keep that buzz going though", and 1UP agreed, remarking "That it represents the best, if not the first, online multiplayer sandbox game on a console is just gravy". Reviews did critique the lack of any appreciable story within the game, and how short the core game itself may be; IGN argued "Crackdown won't last that long, it's uneven, and the story and the music are weak sauce".

Crackdown was not expected to be a good game, due to it being tied to the anticipated Halo 3 multiplayer beta. However, the game surpassed many expectations; in his review, GameSpy's Gabe Graziani asked readers the rhetorical question; "Notice that I didn't mention the Halo 3 beta offer during this whole article? That's because it's completely irrelevant when looking at Crackdown, it's a solid game that delivers exactly what it promises: a giant sandbox to blow the crap out of".

The game was named the 2007 BAFTA "Best Action and Adventure Game" and "Best Use of Audio". and also won the "Best Debut" award at the 2008 Game Developers Choice Awards. The game received the Innovation Award at the 2007 Develop Awards, held by Develop. Game Informer listed it as one of the top 50 games of 2007, citing its unique experience and several other elements. They listed the agents as the number eight top heroes of 2007 and climbing the tallest building in the city as the number nine top moment of 2007.

=== Sales ===
Crackdown premiered to very strong sales. During the week of its worldwide release of February 2007, it was the top selling Xbox 360 game in North America, Japan, and the UK. The game was the top selling game in North America for the month of February 2007, selling 427,000 units. Ultimately, by the end of 2007, the game sold 1.5 million copies worldwide. It received a "Gold" sales award from the Entertainment and Leisure Software Publishers Association (ELSPA), indicating sales of at least 200,000 copies in the United Kingdom. The game is not sold in Germany due to the USK's decision not to rate the game; according to GameSpot, this was due to pending legislation at the time to create criminal penalties for games that included "cruel violence on humans or human-looking characters".

== Sequels ==
Wilson and lead designer Billy Thomson had previously confirmed that Crackdown was designed from the outset to be a long-running series of games, stating that sequels for the game are very likely to be produced, especially if Crackdown performed well commercially. However, during the Industry All Stars event in September 2007, Wilson confirmed that Realtime Worlds was not working on a sequel to the game, saying "Microsoft was a little late in stepping up to the plate to ask for Crackdown 2, and by then we had already started working on bigger, better things". However, then-corporate vice president of Microsoft Game Studios, Shane Kim, stated that Microsoft still holds the intellectual property rights for Crackdown and that a Crackdown sequel was still a possibility. Realtime Studios manager Colin MacDonald clarified that if they have the resources after completion of APB, they could approach Microsoft to discuss a sequel.

At Microsoft's E3 conference on 1 June 2009, it was announced that Crackdown 2 was at that point of time being developed by a Scottish develop Ruffian Games, formed by members of the Realtime Worlds team. Along with the announcement, an accompanying trailer was released. Crackdown 2 was released on 6 July 2010 in the U.S. and Canada and on 9 July throughout the rest of the world. Crackdown 2 received mixed reviews.

A third title in the series, Crackdown 3 was set to be released worldwide in 2016, which was then changed to 7 November 2017 simultaneously with the Xbox One X, but another delay was announced on 16 August 2017, moving the release back to 2018. In June 2018, the game was confirmed to be delayed again, pushing back to its eventual release date February 2019. Crackdown 3 received mixed reviews.
