= Fallen Earth =

2009 video game

- Developers: Icarus Studios, Fallen Earth
- Publisher: K2 Network
- Platform: Windows
- Release: September 22, 2009
- Genre: Massively multiplayer online role playing
- Mode: Multiplayer

Fallen Earth is a free-to-play massively multiplayer online role-playing game co-developed by Icarus Studios and Fallen Earth. The game takes place in a post-apocalyptic wasteland located around the American Grand Canyon. Fallen Earth's gameplay features elements of both first-person shooter and role-playing video games, first-person/third person views, hundreds of items, including improvised equipment and weapons, a variety of functional vehicles, a real-time, in-depth crafting system (which includes vehicles), various skills and abilities, factions and tactical PvP, all existing within 1000 square kilometers of usable terrain based on real-world topographical maps of the area. The game was released on September 22, 2009. Two years later, GamersFirst purchased the intellectual property and made the game free to play. It was acquired by the publisher Little Orbit in 2018. Two years following its initial shutdown, Fallen Earth's servers were brought back online on October 28, 2021, as a free to play classic server.

== Plot ==
The Fallen Earth story begins in the 21st century, when the first in a series of natural disasters hits the United States. As Americans struggle to recover, an investment tycoon named Brenhauer buys a controlling stake in a mega-corporation named GlobalTech. By 2051, he moves his headquarters to the Grand Canyon Province, where GlobalTech eventually creates a self-sufficient economic and military mini-state. Meanwhile, in India and Pakistan, the Shiva virus, named for the dance-like convulsions that it caused in its victims, appears among the human populace. As the infection starts to spread, countries accuse each other of engineering the virus. Political paranoia turns to open aggression and nuclear conflict. The nuclear conflict combined with the virus devastates the United States. Less than one percent of Earth's population survived the Fall, and the Hoover Dam Garrison and Grand Canyon Province are the only known outposts of human civilization. Outside the protective confines of the Hoover Dam Garrison, the player encounters ruins of the old world, genetically altered creatures, strange technology, and six warring factions. Some factions seek to rebuild the old world, others wish to build a new one in their own image, and some simply desire chaos and anarchy.

== Gameplay ==
The game world of Fallen Earth is based on a real-world topographical map of the Grand Canyon. The world map covers more than 1000 square kilometres of usable terrain. The environment is zoneless and set in sectors which continue the story-arc of the game, and which can be advanced through at the player's own pace.

The game includes first-person and third-person views, a classless system, Player-versus-Player combat, mounted combat, crafting, and a noise-based stealth system. Fallen Earth offers customizable features, including: clothing, facial features, skin tones, hairstyles and colors, age, body and facial hair, body art (tattoos and piercings), height, and makeup. Also after this process players can add points to their character to build strength and other skills. Fallen Earth does not have a fixed class system. It uses skill-based character development with a strong emphasis on flexibility and player preference. The game features active skills—trade-skills as well as mutation-based skills—which can be increased through Advancement Points (APs) or skill usage. Advancement Points are earned alongside level experience, and aside from increasing skill points, can also be used to boost Attributes. Players can undo and "re-spec" their skill point allocation.

Combat in Fallen Earth is generally in a first-person shooter format. The camera can be moved to alternate between third and first person modes. Players will need to manually keep their targets in a targeting reticle to actually hit them in combat. Skills can be used to influence combat in different ways, but again, enemies must still be manually targeted. There is no "target locking" as in other MMOs. There are three main methods of dealing damage in the game. These are broken down by a weapon's effective range. Rifles, pistols, and melee are the primary weapon types. Rifles specialize in long distance damage, but are capable of using some short distance weaponry. Pistols are considered the most balanced of the weapon types, able to do damage at medium to short range. Melee, with its short range, is for close-quarters combat. Fallen Earth has thousands of items as well as equipment and accessories of varying strength for players to craft and equip in up to 22 separate equipment slots. Each piece of equipment varies in weight, and possesses different qualities. Heavier equipment, for example, will generally offer higher defense bonuses, but also increases noise while moving – making stealth more difficult. Fallen Earth allows its players to carry as many as six active weapons which alter the character's appearance. The game also has a variety of vehicles. Players start out neutral in Fallen Earth and can remain neutral or choose to align themselves with a particular faction. Aligning with a faction will give characters a head start in skills and specialized equipment.

== Development ==
After a number of years in the making, Fallen Earth developers announced in a June 2008 press release that the game had reached feature-complete status. In October 2008, the Fallen Earth website reported that the game had reached content-complete status. The first wave of Alpha tests began in August 2008, and closed Beta testing began in February 2009. As part of a promotional campaign, Fallen Earth announced a National Tour on their website in February 2009. They planned to sponsor IGDA meetings, and participating in events across the United States, doing public demonstrations promoting the game and taking part in question-and-answer sessions with the audience.

The game was released on September 22, 2009, with pre-orders from Direct2Drive, Steam and the official website granting early access from September 9, 2009. On March 10, 2010, Icarus Studios announced the beta release of Fallen Earth for the Mac OS X platform. The Mac OS X version of Fallen Earth uses Wine technology and requires an Intel-based Mac system with a discrete graphics processor. On April 5, 2010, the Fallen Earth team announced that Lee Hammock was leaving Fallen Earth to work as story designer on a new MMO title, Gargantuan. On April 30, 2010, chief executive officer of Icarus Studios, Inc., James Hettinger, announced a restructure of the company resources and staffing, effective immediately. Among these changes was the promotion of Fallen Earth writer/content developer Wes Platt to Director of Content Development. On May 4, 2010, Fallen Earth, LLC, announced a new distribution partnership with Interactive Gaming Software (IGS).

In June 2011, it was announced that GamersFirst had purchased the intellectual property of the game and that the game would be going "free to play". The game became free to play in October 2011.

Fallen Earth server's were taken offline in October 2019. On October 27, 2021, Fallen Earth's servers were put back online by Little Orbit subsidiary Gamersfirst.

== Reception ==
Fallen Earth earned the runner-up spot for Best New MMO of 2009 by Beckett Massive Online Gamer. The award was announced on March 11, 2010 The game also won the Best Online-Only Game of 2009 award by Game Industry News.

Fallen Earth has been criticised by IGN for low-quality animation and by other reviewers for numerous bugs.
