= TERA (video game) =

2011 video game

- Original North American cover art
- Developer: Bluehole Studio
- Publishers: Microsoft Windows: NA: En Masse Entertainment (2012-2020); Gameforge (2020-2022); EU: Gameforge; KOR: Nexon; JP: NHN PlayArt
- Designers: Yong-Hyun Park; Byung-Gyu Chang; Huang Cher Ung
- Composer: Inon Zur
- Engine: Unreal Engine 3
- Platforms: Microsoft Windows; PlayStation 4; PlayStation 5; Xbox One; Xbox Series X/S
- Release: Microsoft Windows: KOR: 25 January 2011; NA: 1 May 2012; EU: 3 May 2012; PlayStation 4, Xbox One: WW: 3 April 2018; JP: 29 November 2018
- Genre: Massively multiplayer online role-playing game
- Mode: Multiplayer

TERA (short for The Exiled Realm of Arborea), also known as TERA Online, is a massively multiplayer online role-playing game (MMORPG) developed by Bluehole Studio, a subsidiary of Krafton. The game was released in South Korea on 25 January 2011, in North America on 1 May 2012, and in Europe on 3 May 2012, with closed and open beta tests taking place before the launch dates. Nexon, Krafton, and Gameforge published the game in these regions, respectively. En Masse Entertainment was the North American publisher, until September 2020, while Atari handled physical distribution. In February 2013 the game was renamed to TERA: Rising concurrently with the game's launch to the free-to-play model.

In September 2014, the game was renamed to TERA: Fate of Arun in the same patch that added a new level cap and expanded TERA's horizons with the new continent in Northern Arun: Val Oriyn "cut off from the rest of the world for centuries, Northern Arun is a land of savage jungles, colossal ruins, and the undiscovered homeland of the Barakas." The patch became effective in December 2014 in America and Europe. The game has over 28 million players worldwide, as of 2018.

In April 2018, TERA went on to release on the PlayStation 4 and Xbox One, through En Masse Entertainment in North America, Europe, and Japan, whereas Krafton decided to self-publish the game in South East Asia for the PlayStation 4 and Japan for Xbox One.

In September 2020, En Masse Entertainment announced that it would be shutting down its offices after 10 years of service in the gaming industry, where it was decided that Krafton would be publishing TERA's Console version globally – taking over a self-publishing role, in place of En Masse Entertainment, whereas the PC version would be published by Gameforge.

The Console version diverted paths from its original PC counterpart, and declared that it would be taking its own path. TERA is set to release its Crossplay Feature in Mid-November 2020, which players on the PlayStation 4 and Xbox One will be able to play together. In addition to this feature, TERA will offer a free upgrade for the PlayStation 5 and Xbox Series X/S in Holidays 2020, with an Enhanced Graphics Mode – which will allow for cross-generation and cross-platform gaming.

On 20 April 2022, Gameforge announced that Bluehole had decided to cease work on TERA and that Gameforge would shut down the game's servers for PC on 30 June 2022. There are no plans to shut down the console servers.

== Gameplay ==
TERA had typical MMORPG features such as questing, crafting, and player versus player action. The game's combat used a real-time battle system that incorporated third-person camera view. The player targeted an enemy with a cross-hair cursor rather than clicking or tabbing an individual opponent (which was called the "Non-Target battle system" by the developer). The Players needed to actively dodge enemy attacks. A keyboard and mouse or a control pad could be used to control the character.

Characters were one of seven races allied with the Valkyon Federation. Each race had a set of unique "racial skills" that gave them minor advantages. Races also had their own unique animations for many class-specific skills. TERA also had 13 classes (as of October 2017), each with their own unique abilities and attributes.

The developers collaborated with CCP Games and their successful use of "PLEX" for Eve Online as a way of deterring gold farmers. As a result, TERA released a currency called "Chronoscrolls" that worked similarly, as it allowed game time to be purchased with real money and sold for in-game gold. The use of Chronoscrolls was only available to users who had purchased the game either digitally or physically. Those with the "Discovery Edition" could not use Chronoscrolls.

== Plot ==
=== Lore ===
The two beings, Arun and Shara, titans of unimaginable power, met in a formless void. Somehow, Arun and Shara fell asleep and began to dream. As they slept, the Exiled Realm of Arborea began to manifest itself around them. Today, both Arun's and Shara's bodies form the two continents the Exiled Realm of Arborea is made of.

As both titans continued to sleep, their dreams came to life. Out of this dream, the first twelve god-like inhabitants of TERA emerged not long before a terrible war amongst them took place.

Yet, Arun and Shara remained in their dream-like state and simply out of their imagination, the first mortals came to life. The mortals and gods fought each other in great divine wars, leaving most of the gods dead, imprisoned, or otherwise diminished. Even some of the mortal species got wiped out; however, others emerged and today, most of TERA's races form an alliance fighting menaces beyond their world.

== Development ==
In February 2013, TERA in North America and Europe transitioned to TERA: Rising, which changed the subscription model to a "freemium" design (free play plus purchasable premium status and customization options). The developer has promised no time, level, or content restrictions for free players after this update. Players who purchase a 30-day "Elite" status would receive increased dungeon rewards, in-game discounts and other metagame advantages Due to the new model, the "Chronoscrolls" mentioned above are being phased out, and are no longer sold by the developer, nor usable to extend game time. Existing chronoscrolls can be sold to merchants for 2,000 gold.

The Japanese and Korean versions of TERA also became free to play in December 2012 and January 2013, respectively.

On 5 May 2015, TERA's new patch 31.04 was released in which the game became available on Steam. Along with being available on Steam, the gunner class was released and new dungeons were added. Krafton also released inactive character names, making them available to new characters.

In 2019 Patch 80 was released, this update increased the level cap to level 70 and introduced new quests as well as "a new open-world boss system."

In 2021 Patch 109 was released, this update opens up an area created by the original developer team known as Baldera.

On April 20, 2022, Bluehole Studio, the leading development team for TERA, announced termination of the game on PC.

As of June 30, 2022, all operations for the PC version of TERA ceased. This version of the game, unable to continue at any official capacity, remains accessible only through player-run private servers. However, the console version remains active. There are currently no plans for Bluehole to return TERA to PC under any capacity.

== Reception ==
Reception

Aggregate score
Aggregator	Score
Metacritic	PC: 77/100; PS4: 68/100; XONE: 63/100

Review scores
Publication	Score
Eurogamer	8/10
G4	4/5
GameSpot	7.5/10
IGN	6.5/10
PC Gamer (US)	64/100
The Escapist	3.5/5

TERA was met with generally favorable reviews, citing the action-based gameplay, huge and widely varied seamless world, the exciting and recurring Big Ass Monster (BAM) fights, the ease of using the game's auction house (called the Trade Broker) and lush, detailed graphics as the game's high points. The option of using a console controller also provided much satisfaction for players that wanted to play an MMORPG without relying on a keyboard and mouse. The game's musical score received praise for its varied and emotionally charged tracks ranging from epic orchestral pieces to more mellow tunes. Criticism was directed at the game's generic collect/kill/rendezvous quest grind to level up, with some quests backtracking simply to talk to the same NPC. Player killing was commonly done in the Open World and was met with praise due to the freedom and constant action it can bring to daily questing and traveling. Critics criticized the game's Nexus Wars feature as a blatant rip-off of Rift's system.

In March 2013, after switching to a free-to-play business model, the game passed 1.4 million registered accounts.

By March 2017, TERA had over 25 million users worldwide. As of 5 May 2017, TERA had over 26 million registered players worldwide, including over 6.6 million in North America. A month after its console launch in April 2018, the game had 2 million players on the PlayStation 4 and Xbox One platforms, as of May 2018. In 2018, the game reached over 28 million players worldwide.

== Trade secret civil actions ==
In 2007, NCsoft filed a complaint to South Korean authorities and brought a civil action for damages and an injunction to Bluehole Studio. The Bluehole Studio founders and employees, formerly employed under NCsoft and working on the Lineage III development team, were convicted by a Korean criminal court for the theft of valuable trade secrets from NCsoft in 2009. In 2010, a Korean civil court held these individuals, along with Bluehole Studio, liable for misappropriation of trade secrets, awarding NCsoft about $2 million in damages and issuing an injunction against utilizing trade secrets for monetary gain. The damages were later reversed by an appellate court, but the injunction remained in place. Despite the injunction, Bluehole Studio developed and released TERA in South Korea.

On 9 January 2012, NCsoft filed a civil action in the United States against Bluehole Studio and its U.S. subsidiary En Masse. NCsoft was seeking a preliminary and permanent injunction prohibiting the launch of TERA in the United States, or damages for the substantial harm that the launch would cause NCsoft. They asserted claims for copyright infringement, trade secret misappropriation, breach of confidence, unfair competition, and unjust enrichment under the laws of the state of New York.

On 18 April 2012, En Masse Entertainment announced they were found not guilty in the Korean civil actions. However, six employees were found guilty.
