= ChronoBlade =

2012 mobile role-playing game

- Developer: nWay Games
- Publisher: nWay Games
- Platforms: Facebook, iOS, Android
- Release: 2012
- Genre: ARPG
- Modes: Single-player, Multiplayer

ChronoBlade is an indie 2D free-to-play online game developed and published by American independent video game company nWay Games. It was currently published on Facebook and has also been launched on Android and IOS devices.

== Plot ==
ChronoBlade takes place in the Multiverse where countless possible Earths exist, but each reality has been invaded by the army of the Chronarch Imperium. As a last resort, four survivors named Aurok, Lophi, Thera and Lucas decide to band together and found "ChronoBlade," the faction that can oppose Chronarchs and save reality itself.

== Reception ==
ChronoBlade received middlingly reviews on release, with reviewers praising the game's gameplay as visceral and brutal but criticizing the game's progression systems as a grind.
