= Alliance of Valiant Arms =

Online video game

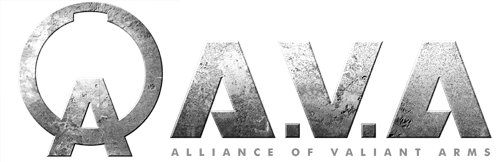
- Developers: Neowiz; Red Duck, Inc.
- Engine: Upcoming: Unreal Engine 4 In-Service: Unreal Engine 3
- Platform: Microsoft Windows
- Release: WW: August 23, 2022; ROK: 2007; NA: November 11, 2009
- Genre: First-person shooter
- Mode: Multiplayer

Alliance of Valiant Arms (abbreviated as A.V.A, Korean: 아바, romanized: Aba, 简体中文：《战地之王》, 繁體中文：《戰地之王》) is a free-to-play online first-person shooter video game, developed by now-defunct Red Duck, Inc. using Unreal Engine 3. Since then, Neowiz has taken over the development and publishing of the game after acquiring its intellectual property.

In North America and Europe, the game was published by En Masse Entertainment (2016–2018), Aeria Games (2012–2016), and ijji (2009-2012). It is hosted in the People's Republic of China by Tencent Games, and in Taiwan by Garena(previously WarTown). In Japan and Korea the game is hosted by NEOWIZ (operator of Pmang).

On June 15, 2011, A.V.A became available for download through Steam.

The North American and European version of the game was shut down on June 29, 2018. Red Duck, Inc. attempted to self-publish a modified version of the game for these regions called Alliance of Valiant Arms: DOG TAG, launching open beta on May 2, 2019. AVA: Dog Tag was shut down on May 29, 2019. The servers were also shut down for Taiwanese version on July 30, 2019 and September 25, 2019 for Chinese version.

The Steam service for the global version completed 2 days of Closed Beta Testing through Steam Playtest. This took place from November 26 to 28, 2021 KST.

== Gameplay ==
Players join either the EU forces (European Union) or NRF forces (the fictional "Neo Russian Federation") and attempt to complete their mission objective or eliminate the opposing team. There are three classes available in A.V.A: point man, rifleman, and sniper. A point man enjoys faster movement speed and is generally suited for close range combat, while riflemen are suited for medium ranges, and snipers are well suited for longer ranges with sniper rifles that feature more damage and penetration power. Each class has unique advantages and disadvantages against other classes. Players are able to choose between classes freely and also acquire Class Skills to further enhance unique characteristics of each class.

Alliance of Valiant Arms awards players military ranks based on total experience (gained through playing various game modes and completing objectives). Incentives to rank up include the ability to unlock and purchase various armor, equipment, and guns. The main in-game currency is the Euro, which can be used for purchases in the shop, repairing weapons, and to enter Capsule Shop drawings, which are lotteries for rare equipment. Euros are earned from finishing a match, a possible Quick Match reward, a bonus received from buying items with real money. Players can also purchase equipment from the shop using AVA Medals, which can be bought by the player using real-world money. Some items in the game can only be purchased using AVA Medals. Most items in the shop can be bought for an expendable or permanent duration.

Players have a number of options to customize their characters, ranging from selecting different character avatars, equipment (armor, grenades, weapons), and even changing their weapon's characteristics (damage, range, accuracy, stability, rate of fire, ammo) through various weapon modifications. The Team Fortress 2 weapon "The Black Rose" and an AVA melee weapon "Holy Mackerel" was awarded to players who registered on Steam and completed the Alliance of Valiant Arms achievement 1st One Down by playing their first game.

An in-game clan system existed for players to participate in. In lieu of voice chat, players could quickly issue commands and responses to teammates through keyboard shortcuts.

== Game modes ==
There were 10 game modes in the En Masse version of A.V.A:

- AI Mission - A group of 4 or 6 players is automatically assigned to the EU to survive and/or complete mission objectives while fighting against AI-Controlled NRF.
- Annihilation - Similar to team death-match, players on two opposing teams attempted to reach the score within the allowed time limit.
- Cross Steal - Both teams are tasked with retrieving the enemy's launch key and returning it to their own base, while defending their own launch key.
- Demolition - EU forces must successfully plant and detonate the bomb, or eliminate the enemy team to win a round. The NRF forces must eliminate the EU team, defuse the bomb, or survive the time limit while preventing a bomb plant in order to win a round. The demolition mode was the only mode played at eSports events (IESF, AIC).
- Domination - Both teams compete for domination over a target. The team with higher domination gauge or the one in control of the target when both sides have the same gauge will win.
- Escape - EU troops try to escape to a waiting boat (E-boat) or car (E-space) while NRF troops try to stop them. The round ends when the opposing team is wiped out, or when one soldier makes it to the boat.
- Escort - The EU forces must escort a tank past enemy lines and repair it if struck down, while the NRF forces will be tasked with damaging the tank with RPGs.
- Free For All - Players are pit against each other. The match ends when one player reaches the pre-set score or time runs out in which case the player with the highest score wins.
- Infection - Each match begins with a countdown, during which players must set up a defensive position or plan a strategy to combat against the zombies. When the countdown is up, one or more players (depending on the total number of players in the match) are transformed into zombies randomly. Human players must survive until the time is up, while the zombies must infect all human players. The randomly-chosen host infection player must attack regular players to convert them into infected players. Afterwards, the Infected ones will move significantly faster than regular players and retain three times the health of the regular ones. Non-infected humans must collaborate in order to survive.
- Lastman Standing - This is a free and open game mode featuring a new map with chaotic game-play. The main objective is to survive until the end, becoming the last survivor. The map will lead to weapons (including melee weapons), gear and eventually vehicles. Also, one can find chests around the map which require a specific key to open.

For the launch of A.V.A Global there is a limited selection of game modes available:

== Upcoming AVA Games ==
- The game (AVA Global) will be returning to Steam on August 25, 2022, as announced on their official website.
- In early June 2021, an Unreal Engine 4 based AVA game was revealed on Neowiz's job listing website.

== Original Game Closure ==
On January 5, 2012, ijji, A.V.A's publisher in the West, was sold to Aeria Games who continued to operate A.V.A until 2016. Amid a declining player base, the contract between Red Duck and Aeria Games was not renewed in 2016 in part due to Aeria's refusal to pay for a team to attend AIC 2016, A.V.A's major eSports tournament. As a result, A.V.A migrated to En Masse Entertainment in 2016, which continued to provide service for the game in Western regions until June 29, 2018.

In 2018, Red Duck Inc. underwent court-ordered restructuring as a result of insolvency.

Following Red Duck Inc's bankruptcy, Tencent AVA closed in September 2019.
