= Mobile Forces =

2002 video game

- Developer: Rage Games (Scotland)
- Publishers: Majesco; Sold Out software
- Producer: Colin Macdonald
- Designers: Billy Thomson; Stephen Banks; Pat Fitzimons
- Engine: Unreal Engine 1
- Platform: Microsoft Windows
- Release: EU: May 31, 2002; NA: August 16, 2002
- Genre: First-person shooter
- Modes: Single-player, multiplayer

Mobile Forces is a 2002 first-person shooter video game developed by Rage Software and published by Majesco for Microsoft Windows. The game uses the Unreal Engine. The core team of Rage Games who developed Mobile Forces went on to become Realtime Worlds.

== Gameplay ==
Mobile Forces is a first-person shooter game where battles against the opposing team or against other players happen to win matches. Game features two singleplayer modes - Missions and Skirmish. In the former, players are required to excel at a set number of game styles in order to unlock further maps on which to play. Within each next map, bot difficulty level rises up and goes through seven bot skill levels. Skirmish game mode allows to play custom matches.

Mobile Forces has eight different game modes:

- Deathmatch - the goal of this game style is to eliminate players in the map.
- Team Deathmatch - similar to Deathmatch, only played in teams - Red and Blue.
- Captains - in this game mode each team gets a captain and it is needed to kill opposing team's leader in order to score a point.
- Capture the flag - in this game type both teams have to steal each other's flags in order to win.
- Holdout - this game mode has a resemblance to the King of the Hill style. Specifically, both teams are tasked with capturing a single beacon on a map, the team that holds the beacon a set time or the longest wins.
- Detonation - in this game style members of both sides scramble to acquire a keycard located centrally in the map, which must then be taken to a console in the opposing team's base to activate an explosive device to score.
- Safe Cracker - this game type involves the infiltration of the enemy team's base where it is needed to open the safe and retrieve the loot. After the match attackers and defenders switch between each other.
- Trailer - the use of vehicles is integral to success in this team game style, requiring players to drive explosive-laden units into the base of their opponents in order to get points.

Unlike the games Counter-Strike and Unreal Tournament, Mobile Forces features its own weapon system. On the spawn, the loadout screen is given with a selection of armament and armoury. The more lethal weapons are taken from loadout (e. g. rocket launcher or the heavy machinegun), the less it is left for the life preserving sundries of body armor and adrenaline shots. Full equip tends to have an effect to player's speed of movement (slow movement).

The game also introduces a combination of vehicle and FPS gameplay, a rarity at the time when the game was released.

== Development ==
By the time the studio was set up, Rage team had to make a game, and they were uncertain what it will be. The crew made many titles, so they were sure that they will come out with something. The desire was to make a FPS game, so Rage team signed a license for Unreal Engine and started working on Mobile Forces.

The reason Rage team chose to work on Unreal Engine was that many good games were created by that time using the software.

The main inspiration was the game Codename Eagle. As it featured a bunch of great implementations in that time, the game wasn't focused on anything else (e.g. single-player and multiplayer gameplay, AI) and Rage wanted not to repeat the same mistake (keep the elements in the game balanced).

It took 18 months to create the game (started at the end of the year 2000).
