= En Masse Entertainment =

American video game publisher

En Masse Entertainment, Inc.
- Formerly: Bluehole Interactive, Inc. (2008–2010)
- Type: Subsidiary
- Industry: Video games
- Founded: June 2008; 18 years ago
- Defunct: August 17, 2020
- Headquarters: Seattle, US
- Area served: North America
- Key people: Chris Lee (CEO); Soo Min Park (COO)
- Products: TERA; Alliance of Valiant Arms; Closers
- Parent: Bluehole (2008–2018); Krafton Game Union (2018–2020)
- Website: enmasse.com

En Masse Entertainment, Inc. (formerly Bluehole Interactive, Inc.) was an American video game publisher. Founded in June 2008, the company was based in Seattle, Washington, and is best known for publishing massively multiplayer online role-playing game TERA, which was developed by parent company Bluehole. The original En Masse leadership team had extensive experience in the video game industry at leading companies, including Blizzard Entertainment, Microsoft, NCsoft, ArenaNet, and Electronic Arts. In January 2013, Chris Lee and Soo Min Park became chief executive officer and chief operating officer, respectively. On November 5, 2018, Bluehole and its subsidiaries, which include En Masse, were rearranged horizontally under a new parent company, Krafton Game Union. En Masse announced on August 17, 2020, that it had begun ceasing operations.

== Games published ==
=== TERA ===
TERA was launched in Korea in January 2011. Over the next 15 months, En Masse Entertainment completed its localization and westernization work and built the infrastructure needed to publish and maintain the game on North American servers. TERA launched in North America on May 1, 2012.

Less than a year after launching TERA in North America, En Masse Entertainment successfully transitioned the game to a free-to-play model. The transition happened in February 2013 and coincided with the release of the TERA: Rising update. En Masse Entertainment transitioned paying subscribers to Elite Status players, who received extra perks for paying a monthly fee. However, all content in the game was, and still is, freely and fully available to all players.

En Masse Entertainment released the first official expansion for TERA on December 16, 2014. TERA: Fate of Arun added four new zones and a new city, increased the level cap for characters from 60 to 65, and added numerous quests, dungeons, and other improvements to the game. This major content expansion was made available to all players free of charge.

On May 5, 2015, En Masse Entertainment also made TERA: Fate of Arun available through Steam. The Steam launch coincided with another major content release that added a new character class to the game — the gunner. TERA: Fate of Arun quickly became the number one free-to-play MMORPG on Steam, as measured by concurrent users.

=== CLOSERS ===
Closers is an episodic anime action RPG with a storyline that unfolds over several seasons, and beat-’em-up action set in the beleaguered city of New Seoul. Get to know the team’s personalities, and battle monsters in classic arcade style. En Masse Entertainment is the publisher for CLOSERS in North America and Europe only. The game was officially launched in Europe and North America on February 6, 2018.

=== ZMR ===
The next step in the growth of the company after publishing TERA was signing and publishing a second game. En Masse Entertainment signed a deal with Yingpei Games in 2013 to publish a North American version of the popular, Chinese third-person shooter, Mercenary Ops. Named ZMR or Zombies Monsters Robots, the En Masse Entertainment version of this squad-based free-to-play adventure game officially launched in North America in September 2014.

In September 2017, it was announced the Zombies Monsters Robots would be shutting down with no plans to migrate the service elsewhere. To coincide with this announcement, several items were made free in the game's store. Along with this, any players who accessed the game between July 18 and September 18, 2017 were given 1,000 free EMP (En Masse Points.) En Masse left players with a final statement: "On behalf of all of us here at En Masse Entertainment, thank you for joining us these past few years, and we sincerely hope you’ll give our other games a try, too. In the meantime, you’ve only got until Halloween to accomplish your primary mission: Kill. Every. Last. Thing."

=== Fruit Attacks ===
In the fall of 2015, En Masse Entertainment entered another new phase of their growth as a game publisher by launching two mobile games. The first, Fruit Attacks, is an arcade puzzle game where players defend Earth from invading fruit aliens. Fruit Attacks was released on July 30, 2015, for Android and iOS.

=== Pocket Platoons ===
Shortly after launching Fruit Attacks, on August 27, 2015, En Masse Entertainment released Pocket Platoons, a base-building combat strategy game set in World War II Normandy. Pocket Platoons is available on iOS and Android devices. It was later remove in February 2017.

=== Alliance of Valiant Arms ===
In July 2016, the license to host Alliance of Valiant Arms was revealed to have been give to En Masse Entertainment. It was previously hosted by Aeria Games. The closed beta commenced on August 18, 2016, lasting until the August 23, 2018. The open beta followed on August 25, and the game was officially re-launched on September 22 of that year. The game is a free-to-play first-person shooter, which takes place in an alternate future wherein the Neo-Russian Federation has begun to take back former Soviet countries and allies, then targeting the rest of Europe with the European Union combating them. It was developed by Red Duck and first released in Korea in 2007.

=== The Dark Crystal: Age of Resistance ===
In June 2019, En Masse Entertainment announced that it will be in charge of publication duties for The Dark Crystal: Age of Resistance Tactics, a multiplatform strategy RPG that is based on the upcoming Netflix series. The game will be released for Nintendo Switch, PlayStation 4, Xbox One and PC/Mac.

=== Stranger Things 3: The Game ===
The companion game to the Netflix series. Developed by Netflix and BonusXP, and published by En Masse Entertainment. Launched July 4, 2019.
