= APB: All Points Bulletin =

2010 video game

- Developers: Realtime Worlds (former); Reloaded Productions (acquisition)
- Publishers: Realtime Worlds; Electronic Arts; K2 Network (acquisition) (2010-2018); Little Orbit (2018-present)
- Designer: David Jones
- Engine: Unreal Engine 3
- Platforms: Microsoft Windows; Xbox One; PlayStation 4
- Release: Microsoft Windows: NA: 29 June 2010; EU: 1 July 2010; UK: 2 July 2010; Xbox One; 3 June 2016; PlayStation 4; 31 March 2017
- Genres: Action-adventure, third-person shooter, MMORPG
- Mode: Multiplayer

APB: All Points Bulletin is an open world multiplayer online video game for Microsoft Windows developed by Realtime Worlds and acquired by Reloaded Productions, which is part of the GamersFirst company. Little Orbit acquired GamersFirst in 2018 and is now in charge of the game's development. Based in urban sprawls and featuring two factions, Enforcers and the Criminals, players can form sub-groups in either faction and carry out missions. The game design was led by David Jones. It was released in 2010 in North America and Europe.

After Realtime Worlds was placed into administration, the servers for online play were shut down later in 2010, but they were reactivated when online gaming company K2 Network purchased APB for £1.5 million and relaunched it under their subsidiary company Reloaded Productions as a free-to-play game, renamed APB: Reloaded. In 2015, Deep Silver announced versions of the game for the PlayStation 4 and Xbox One in collaboration with Reloaded Productions and The Workshop Entertainment for release in 2015. The game was ultimately released in 2016 for Xbox One and in 2017 for the PlayStation 4. Since 2019, all copyright of APB belongs to Unit Game, which has a series of APB game development plans.

== Gameplay ==
APB: All Points Bulletin takes place in the modern-day city of San Paro where there is a constant battle between Enforcers and Criminals, and the player will need to decide to which faction they want to belong.

Gameplay typically consists of the two sides fighting one another in missions, where one side must complete a series of objectives with the other side attempting to stop them doing so. For example, several Criminal players may rob a convenience store within the game; the game will then seek out one or more Enforcer players of equivalent skills and other criteria and will issue an all-points bulletin for them to stop the robbery and apprehend or eliminate the Criminals. Players earn money for participating in these missions, which can then be used to upgrade weapons, vehicles, and their character appearances, all of which influence the game.

The game is played in the third person perspective. Upgrades, equipment, weapons, vehicles and clothing can be purchased from various contacts around the city (or can be alternatively bought through terminals in the social district), while ammunition is bought from vending machine-like terminals. Both the contacts and the "vending machines" are scattered throughout the main three districts of the city. Two of the districts feature their own fully persistent portions of San Paro, with their own pedestrian AI and a dynamic day/night cycle, along with certain contacts and missions. The third district acts mainly as a social component, being much smaller, having no pedestrians, restricting weapon and vehicle access, and featuring garages, auction houses, music studios, and several other non-player character (NPC) terminal shops. While in the third district, players, even if they're from opposing factions, cannot harm each other and may only interact through chat. In the other two districts, players are allowed to attack each other (so long as they are from opposing factions) during certain mission scenarios and/or if a player has a bounty on their head. When outside of these missions players can still draw and use weapons, but bullets, grenades, etc. will not work on other players, even those from an enemy faction. This prevents deathmatching and griefing.

There are also two other districts under the category of "fight club". These feature pure player versus player (PvP) environments for more experienced players and clans.

Depending on faction, players will have either a Prestige or Notoriety level, going from 0 to 5. This level goes up as the player successfully performs actions that help their faction's cause, such as killing players of the opposing faction, completing missions successfully, or by engaging in activities unique to their faction. Such unique faction actions include mugging pedestrians for Criminals, or arresting Criminals for Enforcers. The level decreases as the player hinders their faction; for instance, team-killing, dying, and destroying city objects as Enforcers.

The game houses an in-game music system similar to Grand Theft Auto. It features established acts, but also emerging artists including Honey Claws, Atlas&i, Avosetta, Negative pH, Paulie Rhyme and Pendulum. The game allows players to import music into the music player. If other players also have the same song imported to their music player, they will hear the music on the player's car radio. If another player does not have the same song imported, Last.fm will select a similar song to play instead. The player can also create their own music using the music editor options available in the social district.

== Development and release ==
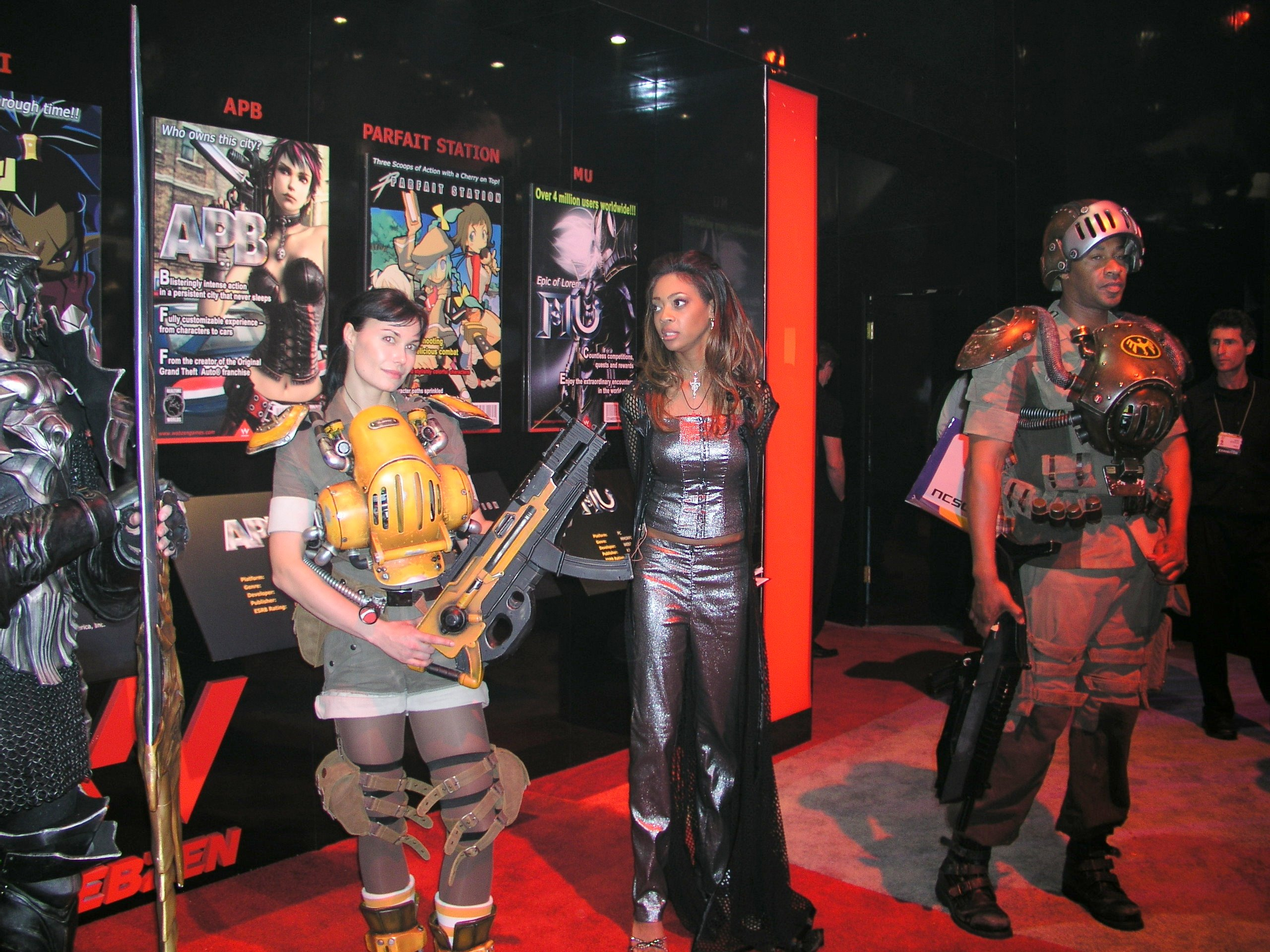
APB promotion at E3 2006

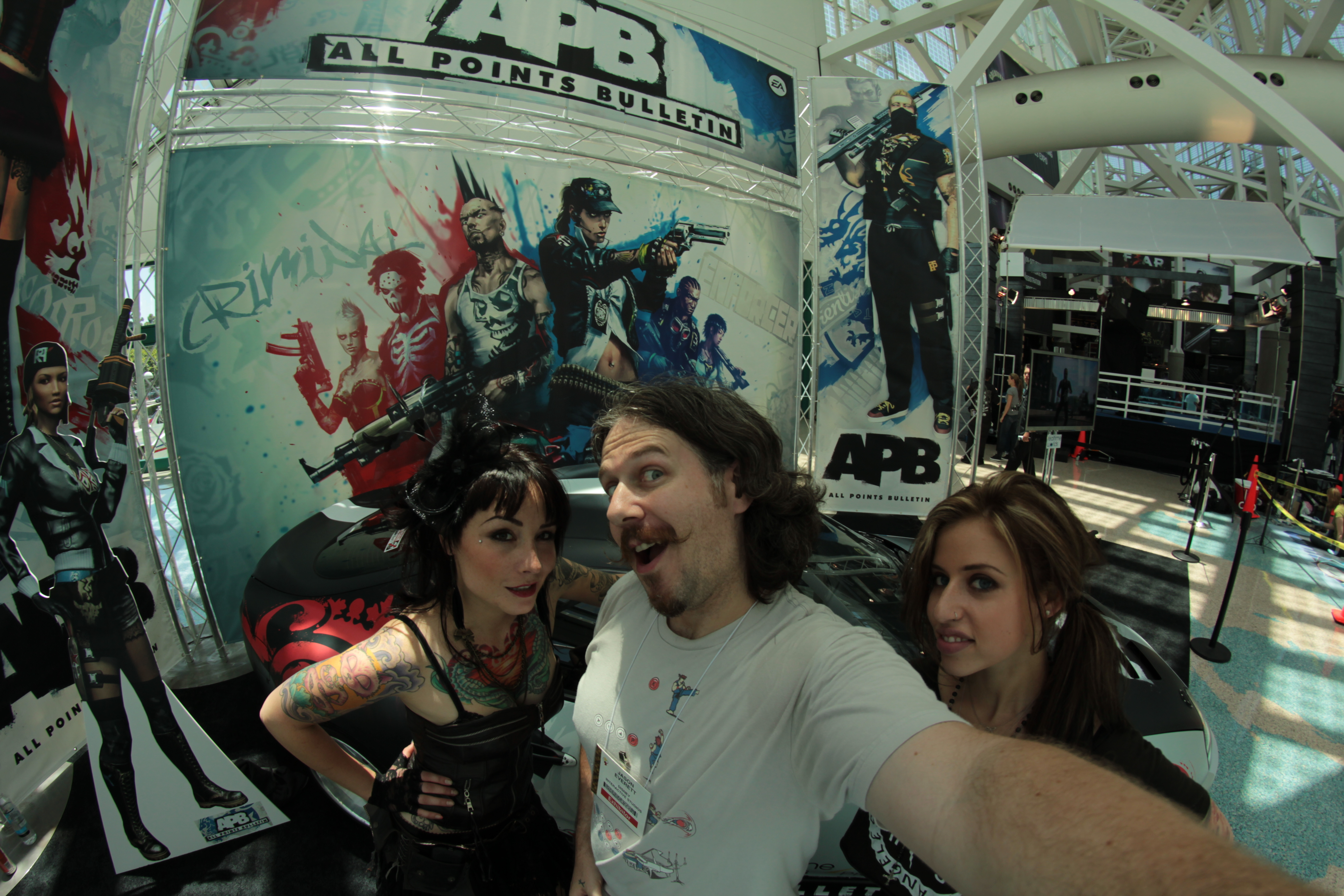
APB promotion at E3 2010

APB has been described by Realtime Worlds executive Colin MacDonald as being "the bastard child of everything we've been striving towards over the 15–20 years" and a culmination of "what [David Jones has] always wanted to do from GTA and before Crackdown and APB." APB was planned as early as 2005, initially as a Microsoft Windows and Xbox 360 title, and intended as the flagship title for the then-newly founded Realtime Worlds studio created by David Jones. Then, it was planned that the Xbox 360 release would be in 2010. In the interim time, Realtime Worlds developed the video game Crackdown, released in 2007, which bore some resemblance to the concepts that were to be in APB.

At the 2008 Game Developers Conference, David Jones stated that APB would be released in 2008. Jones noted that APB would be more like a multiplayer online game with players interacting with up to 25 other players at the same time. He also noted that the game compared well to the typical style of fantasy or sci-fi "multiplayer online" games such as World of Warcraft, but did not expect to compete with those games, as the concept was different. On 14 April 2008, Realtime Worlds announced that it had raised $50 million for APB and other future projects. However, he confirmed that Realtime Worlds was now looking at a 2009 release. In this same announcement and subsequent interviews, the company stated that the game was now scheduled for release on Microsoft Windows in 2009, and with options for eventual versions on the Xbox 360.

On 21 April 2008, Realtime Worlds announced that it had reacquired the global distribution rights for APB, significantly amending the arrangement made in 2005 with Webzen Games. An industry rumour suggested that Realtime Worlds planned to sell the game to Rockstar Games in order to re-craft it as a massively multiplayer Grand Theft Auto, though Realtime Worlds denied these rumors.

In June 2009, Andy Eddy from teamxbox.com reported, "Not only did a spokesperson indicate to me after the EA announcement that the title was being developed for Xbox 360, during today's presentation [at E3 2010], Realtime's Dave Jones said that the first consideration would be the PC release, and then it'll come to the console side. So, while what follows isn't strictly for the Xbox 360, it seems that Realtime Worlds sending the game our way is a definite. If everything that I saw today actually comes to our favourite system, we should all be very, very happy." In July 2009, EJ Moreland from Realtime Worlds made it clear that APB would be a PC release only for the first release, but they would be looking at the possibilities for a console version.

A PC closed beta ran from 19 October 2009 to 4 June 2010. This was followed by an open beta which ran from 12 June 2010 to 19 June 2010. Development costs were in excess of $100 million, making it one of the most expensive video games in history.

On 30 April 2010, a press release was published by official fansite APB Evolved that included pricing information and release dates: 29 June 2010 in North America, 1 July in Mainland Europe and 2 July in the United Kingdom. A subscription-like system was used, where players purchase game time for action districts, either by purchasing hours or by opting for an unlimited playtime option for 30 days. Players were required to purchase a copy of the game which included 50 hours of initial game time. Both the game and the website were available in French, German, Spanish, Italian, Russian and English.

APB: Reloaded was published by GamersFirst in every country except in Brazil, which is published by the Brazilian developer and publisher Hoplon Infotainment. and Russia, which is published by Innova Systems.

=== Shutdown and relaunch ===
On 17 August 2010, Realtime Worlds was placed into administration. The administrators intended to keep the company trading whilst they attempted to find a buyer for the firm. If a buyer could not be found then the long-term future for the game was uncertain. On 16 September 2010, Realtime Worlds announced APB servers were to be shut down "soon" with no specific date given. On 11 November 2010, online games company K2 Network purchased APB for £1.5 million. No time frame for re-release or reactivation of servers was announced. On 16 November 2010, K2 Network's subsidiary company Reloaded Productions announced that APB would be re-launched during the first half of 2011 as a free-to-play game, renamed APB: Reloaded.

In August 2019, Little Orbit reached terms to sell the APB IP to Unit Game. Under these terms, Unit Game would take over development for an all-new APB mobile game starting with the Asian market and then expand worldwide, while Little Orbit would keep the rights to the current APB Reloaded title on PC, Xbox One, and PlayStation 4 to continue developing and expanding on that title.

The console versions of APB Reloaded shut down in 2024. The Xbox One version ended service by January that year, while the PlayStation 4 version shut down on August 2.

== Reception ==
Reception

Aggregate score
Aggregator	Score
Metacritic	58%

Review scores
Publication	Score
1Up.com	D
Destructoid	35/100
Edge	7/10
Eurogamer	6/10
IGN	77/100
PC Gamer (US)	55/100

Reception to APB has been mixed, with the game holding a 58% average on Metacritic as of February 2016.

Initial reviews included PC Gamer giving the title 55/100. and Eurogamer giving APB a 6/10 1UP awarded APB a grade of D and Destructoid gave a 35/100. Other reviews were higher, with IGN giving a 77/100 and Edge granting a 7/10. The main criticism includes the game feeling unfinished and underdeveloped.

=== Review embargo ===
APB's release was met with some criticism due to a review embargo, planned to last until a week after release. Whilst review embargoes are commonplace in games journalism, the length caused a large backlash in the reviewing community. John Walker from Rock, Paper, Shotgun stated "Whatever their reason is, they've crossed a very obvious, very ridiculous line. When anyone anywhere can post a review to their blog, a comments thread, or a site's reader reviews section, it's beyond daft to think that the site itself cannot." Realtime Worlds responded by stating "Before finalizing reviews, we want you to experience the full, rich experience of APB as it is meant to be seen. We want you to see wild customer customizations, player progression and clans making an impact on the living, breathing city of San Paro. This key code also therefore grants you, along with our pre-order customers, VIP early access before the official launch day; 26 June in North America and 28 June in Europe."
