= Realtime Worlds =

British video game developer

Realtime Worlds Ltd.
- Formerly: Rage Games (Scotland) Limited (2000–2002); Real Time Worlds Ltd. (2002–2007)
- Company type: Private
- Industry: Video games
- Founded: 7 February 2000; 26 years ago
- Founder: David Jones
- Defunct: 17 August 2010
- Fate: Administration
- Headquarters: Dundee, Scotland
- Products: Crackdown; APB: All Points Bulletin
- Number of employees: 200 (2010)

Realtime Worlds Ltd. (formerly Rage Games (Scotland) Limited and Real Time Worlds Ltd.) was a British video game developer based in Dundee. The studio was formed in February 2000 when Rage Software hired David Jones to lead its Scottish operations. In March 2002, a financially stricken Rage Software sold the studio to Jones, who renamed it Real Time Worlds. After developing Crackdown (2007) and APB: All Points Bulletin (2009), Realtime Worlds filed for administration in August 2010.

== Foundation ==
On 7 February 2000, Rage Software announced that it had hired David Jones, the founder of DMA Design, to lead new operations in Scotland for the company. His studio developed the shooter game Mobile Forces. Due to financial issues that arose at Rage Software, the company announced in March 2002 that it would sell the studio to Jones. Jones subsequently renamed the company Real Time Worlds.

== Development ==
On 11 December 2006, New Enterprise Associates announced an investment of US$30 million into Realtime Worlds.

Their first release under the name Realtime Worlds was the critically acclaimed 2007 action-adventure third-person sandbox game Crackdown, an Xbox 360 exclusive title. In 2010, they released a massively multiplayer online game for Microsoft Windows, titled APB (All Points Bulletin), which had been in development for five years, and was hoped to generate upwards of "hundreds of millions of pounds".

In 2007, at Develop magazine's Industry Excellence Awards, the company was nominated in a record-breaking seven categories, and took home the awards for Innovation and New UK/European Studio. Company chairman Ian Hetherington was also crowned Development Legend. At the 2007 British Academy of Film and Television Arts Video Game Awards ceremony, Crackdown was nominated in five categories and won two, for Action and Adventure and Use of Audio. In 2008, Crackdown was honored as Best Debut by the GDC's Game Developers Choice awards.

On 14 February 2008, it was announced that Realtime Worlds had secured $50M in funding from a consortium led by venture capitalists Maverick Capital and New Enterprise Associates and joined by the WPP Group, a London-based advertising firm. The funds are expected to be used for "continued expansion".

On 27 April 2009, Gary Dale left his COO position at Take-Two Interactive to become CEO of the company. Dave Jones stepped down as CEO of the company and took on the title of creative director.

On 1 May 2010, Realtime Worlds annual accounts revealed a further $21M investment was made in the company in January 2010. This brings the total investment in Realtime Worlds since 2006 to $101M.

On 29 June 2010, after five years of development, with lengthy delays, APB was released to the general public. As of 15 July 2010, APB had a metacritic score of 58 out of 100. On 7 July 2010, Realtime Worlds announced that it was to restructure its work force to focus more on providing "total support" for APB.

On 16 September 2010, Realtime Worlds announced that it would be shutting down APB's servers for good.

== Administration and closure ==
On 17 August 2010, six weeks after the release of APB, Realtime Worlds entered administration with Begbies Traynor, announcing major layoffs to their Dundee division, and mostly closing their Colorado office. References state that 50 employees would be held to maintain the game APB All Points Bulletin, though it was unclear to what extent. Joint administration was conducted by Paul Dounis and Ken Pattullo of the Begbies Traynor Group.

Dounis stated: "Our intention is to continue trading the company while we attempt to find a going concern buyer which will safeguard the future of the business." The following day (18 August), Begbies Traynor announced that Realtime Worlds had attracted interest from potential buyers "from both sides of the Atlantic." On 19 August, Begbies Traynor confirmed that a buyer needed to be found for the company as a going concern by the end of September. If that deadline was not achieved, liquidation was the most likely option for Realtime Worlds.

On 16 September 2010, the remainder of the Realtime Worlds staff was laid off with a temporary skeleton crew left in place to close the offices in Dundee and Colorado.

On 12 November 2010, bidding on thousands of Realtime Worlds lots ended, with industrial auctioneer Sweeney Kincaid managing the sales and collections. The lots included monitors, computers and games consoles.

== Games ==
Year	Game	Publisher	Genre	Platform(s)	
Year	Game	Publisher	Genre	X360	Win
2007	Crackdown	Microsoft Game Studios	Third-person shooter	Yes	No
2010	APB: All Points Bulletin	Electronic Arts	Third-person shooter	No	Yes
