= Space Station Silicon Valley =

1998 video game

- North American Nintendo 64 cover art
- Developer: DMA Design (Note: Tarantula Studios developed the Game Boy Color version and Runecraft developed the PlayStation port.)
- Publisher: Take-Two Interactive
- Designers: Craig Filshie; William Mills
- Programmer: Leslie Benzies
- Artist: Jamie Bryan
- Composer: Stuart Ross (Note: Matt Sugden and Craig Beattie composed the music for the PlayStation version.)
- Platforms: Nintendo 64; Game Boy Color; PlayStation
- Release: 22 October 1998: Nintendo 64; NA: 22 October 1998; EU: November 1998 Game Boy Color; EU: 1999 PlayStation; EU: June 2000
- Genre: Platformer
- Mode: Single-player

Space Station Silicon Valley is a platform video game developed by DMA Design and published by Take-Two Interactive. It was originally released for the Nintendo 64 in October 1998. An adaptation of the game for Game Boy Color was developed by Tarantula Studios and released in 1999. A PlayStation port, developed by Runecraft, was released in 2000, under the name Evo's Space Adventures. Players control Evo, a robot reduced to a crawling microchip after a ship crash, and are tasked with taking control of animals to solve puzzles and defeat enemies.

Development began in September 1995 as part of a publishing deal with BMG Interactive. When this deal fell through, the development team turned their focus to the Nintendo 64, which allowed for a more advanced environment and model processing. The hardware shaped the game's humour and style, with a soft focus look leading to a style akin to Plasticine models. The distinct British humour was also used to distinguish it from other games, and the music was created to resemble B movies.

Upon release, Space Station Silicon Valley was acclaimed by many reviewers, with praise particularly directed at the intuitive mechanics, innovative level design, and comical concepts. It won numerous awards, including Game of the Month and Most Innovative Game from IGN. Despite this, the game performed poorly commercially, and was unable to secure enough sales to warrant a sequel.

== Gameplay ==
In the game, players enter the bodies of animals, gaining their abilities to solve puzzles and defeat enemies.

Space Station Silicon Valley is a platform game that is viewed from a third-person perspective. Players traverse several different environments to advance. Players control Evo, a robot who is reduced to a microchip during a ship crash and must take control of animals to survive. Each animal possesses different characteristics, including survival rate and special attacks, and uses different abilities; for example, large animals such as bears are able to destroy ice blocks which other animals cannot. Some animals cannot survive in certain unfamiliar environments, forcing players to enter the body of another. The animals are used to solve puzzles and defeat enemies, collecting Evo's power cells to maintain energy.

Players are accompanied by Dan Danger, a human who is trapped in the destroyed spaceship. Dan assigns missions to players, occasionally commenting on their performance. The game is set on a space station—the titular Silicon Valley, which consists of four environments: Euro Eden, Arctic Kingdom, Jungle Safari, and Desert Adventure. Each environment consists of numerous sub-levels, ranging from six to ten, each of which task players with certain objectives; examples include activating switches, disabling electric fences, and gathering a set number of objects. As players progress through the levels, they collect the remains of Evo's protective suit, reassembling them for the final level. Each level also contains a hidden objective, such as collecting a souvenir or making an animal perform a certain act; as players complete the hidden objectives, they are rewarded with a gold trophy, and collecting all trophies unlocks a bonus level. However, the Nintendo 64 version contains a glitch which prevents the player from collecting the souvenir from the level Fat Bear Mountain, meaning the special bonus round cannot be accessed normally.

== Plot ==
In the year 2001, the space station Silicon Valley is launched, housing numerous robotic animals. Seven minutes after its launch, it vanishes. Believed to have disappeared forever, it reappears 1000 years later, and the many expeditions sent to retrieve the space station vanish without explanation. Following this, the duo of Dan Danger and Evo are sent to investigate; they crash land in the station and Evo's body is destroyed, reducing him to a microchip. Evo sets out to find his missing parts and fix the control station, which is on a collision course with Earth. Upon repairing his body and arriving at the control room, Evo confronts the Evil Brain controlling the station, who is fascinated by Evo's abilities and wants to keep him to complete the collection of robotic animals. The Evil Brain threatens to destroy the Earth using a shrink ray, but is quickly defeated by Evo. Despite this, Evo is unable to stop the space station from spinning out of control; it collides with Earth, landing in New York Harbor. The robotic animals escape and flee around New York City, but Evo terminates them before they can terrorise the planet.

== Development ==
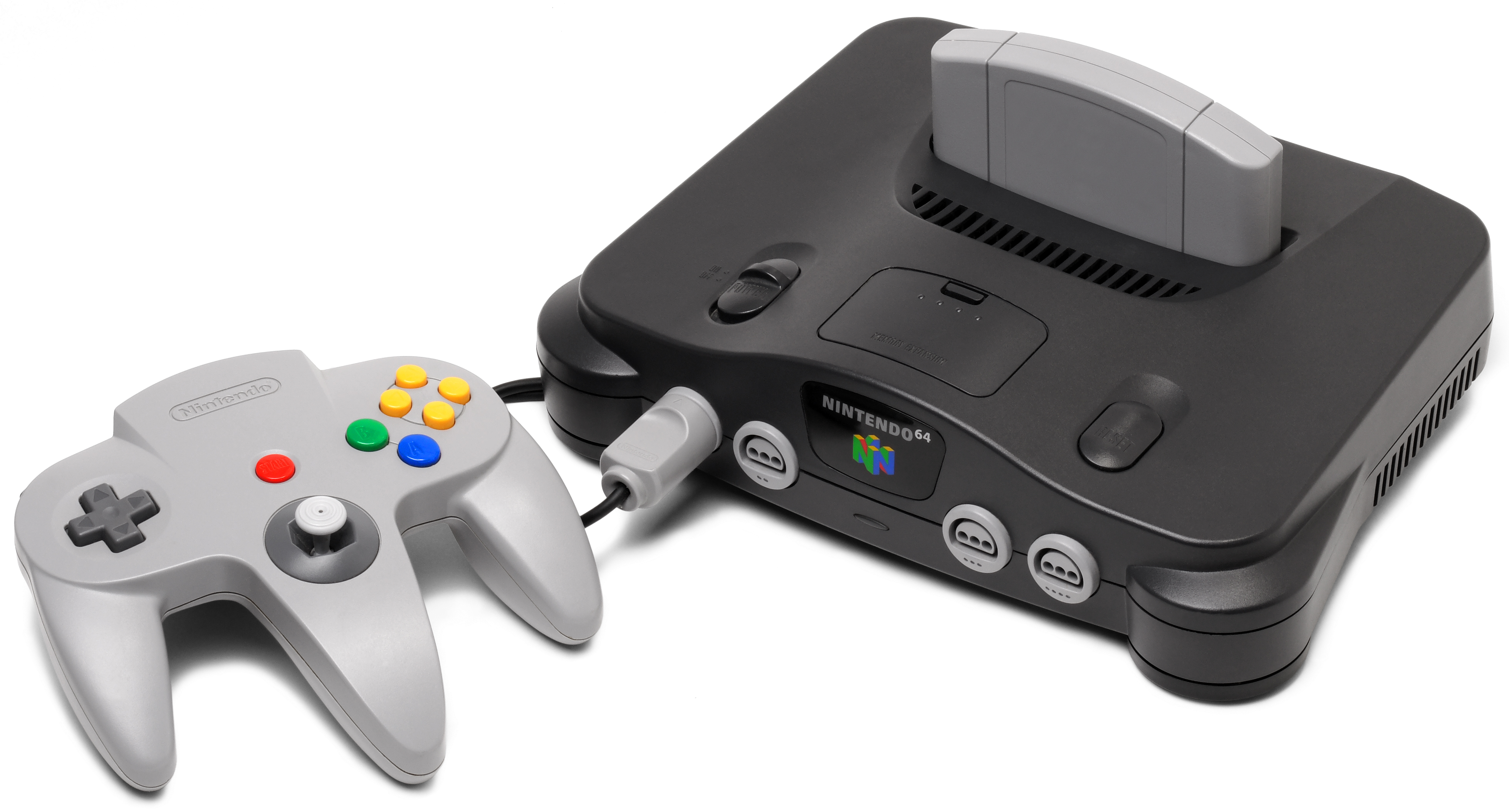
Space Station Silicon Valley was developed for the Nintendo 64. The development team took advantage of the advanced hardware to process the game's models and environments.

Space Station Silicon Valley began development in September 1995, as part of a three-game publishing deal between developer DMA Design and BMG Interactive, the other games being Grand Theft Auto (1997) and Tanktics (1999). All three games were planned to be released on Microsoft Windows, PlayStation and Sega Saturn, as they were the most popular platforms at the time. Following Take-Two Interactive's acquisition of BMG Interactive in March 1998, Take-Two acquired the publishing rights to the game, and the team instead changed focus to develop the game for the Nintendo 64, upon discovering that Windows was incapable of processing the models and environments intended for use. Every member of the team that developed Space Station Silicon Valley began working at DMA Design at the beginning of development, in September 1995. Development began using the then-new DirectX libraries, following the release of Windows 95. The levels were designed and edited using Silicon Graphics computers, which were transferred directly to the Nintendo 64 development boards. The team found the Nintendo 64 to be more advanced than previous hardware; programmer Grant Salvona described the development kits as "the most powerful hardware available in the building".

The game's humour and style were shaped by hardware limitations; when the hardware rendered the character models in soft focus, the team noted that they resembled Plasticine models, and continued to create the game with a look and style akin to Wallace and Gromit. The game was presented with "distinctive 'British' humour" to distinguish it from other games; lead programmer Leslie Benzies and artist Aaron Garbut often presented the team with other Nintendo 64 games, such as Super Mario 64 (1996), to identify the differences. The team ensured that each level felt distinct, while maintaining a coherent style. This diversity was achieved using the development tools, which allowed various members of the team to experiment in creating designs. Manual text writer Brian Baglow said that the game's music provided freedom to the team, as it "doesn't necessarily have to fit the action on the screen". He explained that the audio was designed to fit with the "cheesy, slightly twisted B-movies animation kind of feel". Baglow found that creating the music on a cartridge instead of a CD prompted the team to discover new techniques of working within the boundaries of the former, stating that "people who are doing music for CD-based systems get very, very lazy".

While similar body-swapping games already existed, such as Paradroid (1985), they had little influence on the development of Space Station Silicon Valley. The team were instead influenced by other games in development at DMA, including Grand Theft Auto and Body Harvest (1998). Unlike those games, Space Station Silicon Valley does not take place in an open world; "they're a bugger to make", explained creative director Gary Penn. The objective of the team was to create a game where players were encouraged to try new things to see the outcome. The original concept for the game was that players would eat robots and become increasingly larger, retrospectively described by creative director lead artist Jamie Bryan as being similar to Cubivore: Survival of the Fittest (2002). Another early idea was for the in-game animals to consist of different parts, and destroying one animal would allow players to swap some features with their existing body; this was quickly discarded, as the team realised it would require extensive testing.

The game was developed with little interference from upper management; programmer Obbe Vermeij said that "only after 18 months was there a push to get everything together into a finished game". Space Station Silicon Valley entered beta in August 1998, and was first released for Nintendo 64 on 22 October 1998. Baglow attributed the lengthy development cycle to the scale of the game, stating that "it's got to be fun". Due to a glitch, the game will crash in certain places if the Expansion Pak is present in the console. A 2D remake was released for Game Boy Color in Europe in late 1999; IGN's Tim Jones was critical of the port, criticising the gameplay and level design. The game was also ported to the PlayStation by Runecraft in June 2000, under the title Evo's Space Adventures, although the original development team had little input besides providing the models, codes and textures; Jeuxvideo.com's Sébastien Vidal criticised the poor gameplay and graphics and Hardcore Gaming 101's John Sczepaniak described it as "one of the laziest ports in the history of video games".

== Reception ==
Reception

Aggregate score
Aggregator	Score
Metacritic	83/100

Review scores
Publication	Score
Edge	8/10
Electronic Gaming Monthly	33.5/40 (Note: For Electronic Gaming Monthly, Dan Hsu, John Davison, and Crispin Boyer gave the Nintendo 64 version each a score of 8.5/10, and Sushi-X gave 8/10.)
EP Daily	9.5/10
Game Informer	6.5/10
GameRevolution	B+
GameSpot	7.1/10
Hyper	88%
IGN	(N64) 9.5/10 (GBC) 5/10
N64 Magazine	91%
Next Generation	5/5 stars

Space Station Silicon Valley received "generally favorable" reviews for the Nintendo 64, according to the review aggregator website Metacritic. Praise was particularly directed at the game's intuitive mechanics, innovative level design, and comical concepts. IGN's Matt Casamassina called Space Station Silicon Valley "maybe the most original game to hit Nintendo 64", and Next Generation named it "one of the very best Nintendo 64 has to offer".

Several reviewers lauded the game design's originality, innovation, and complexity. Casamassina of IGN called it "nearly flawless", while Next Generation named it "a satisfying challenge". GameRevolution noted that the game "keeps the emphasis on gameplay", particularly appreciating the attention to detail. GameSpot's Lauren Fielder felt the puzzles were simple to decipher, but noted the game accomplishes its goal of entertaining and amusing players. Game Informer's Andrew Reiner found the game "monotonous" and missions "immensely boring".

Next Generation called the level design "superb", praising the variety and open-ended approach of the levels. Dan Hsu of Electronic Gaming Monthly echoed similar remarks, applauding the game's preparation for contingencies, and Daily Radar's Max Everingham described the levels as "innovative". Arcade's Mark Green lauded the attention to detail in levels, such as footprints in snow. GameRevolution disliked the inability to save the game mid-level, but otherwise appreciated the variety of the levels, while Game Informer found the levels to be "fairly small".

GameRevolution wrote that the game has "some of the best sound yet" for a Nintendo 64 game, praising the variety of the musical tracks. IGN's Casamassina found the music "very well executed" and "very entertaining", likening it to "'futuristic space pop' and elevator-like tunes", and named the sound effects "equally satisfying". Conversely, Electronic Gaming Monthly's Hsu found the music irritating and GamePro's Wes Nihei considered it 'barely alive". Hardcore Gaming 101's Szczepaniak criticised the PlayStation versions music, writing that "the elevator style music is made even more obnoxious, and some of the really good tunes ... have been replaced with awful generic heavy metal".

Critics noted the graphics did not match Nintendo games like Banjo-Kazooie and Super Mario 64 but were suitable for its purpose. GameRevolution praised the graphics, particularly applauding the smooth textures and vibrant colour palette, as well as the detail of the character movement, and Hyper's Cam Shea wrote the graphics were "bright, cheery, and comic". Next Generation felt that the game "doesn't push Nintendo 64's hardware to the limits", and noted some occasional frame rate slowdown, but appreciated the "cute" and simplistic design. Jon Storm of Game Informer called the graphics "lame", criticising the lack of detail in the environments and characters. In a retrospective feature, Craig Owens of Nintendo Gamer wrote that the game's "chunky, angular" art style conveys the "experimental, unpredictable tone". Some critics noted inconveniences in the camera movement.

Electronic Gaming Monthly presented Space Station Silicon Valley the Silver Editor's Choice Award. It was named IGN's Game of the Month for October 1998, and in February 1999 it won Most Innovative Game from IGN, who praised it for capturing "old-school" gameplay mechanics. In January 2007, IGN placed the game fifth on a list of "Underrated and Underappreciated Games", and in April 2009 placed it on a list of "Nintendo 64 Treasures", stating that it "remains one of the great unsung heroes" of the console. Despite its critical success, the game failed to match expected sales, and was unable to earn enough money to warrant a sequel. The team attributed the poor commercial performance to the game's simultaneous launch with The Legend of Zelda: Ocarina of Time, which was Nintendo's marketing focus at the time.

== Bibliography ==
- Baglow, Brian (1998). Space Station Silicon Valley Instruction Booklet. Take 2 Interactive. NUS-NSVP-EUR.
