= Walker (video game) =

1993 video game

- Developer: DMA Design
- Publisher: Psygnosis
- Designers: Ian Dunlop; Neill Glancy
- Composer: Raymond Usher
- Platform: Amiga
- Release: February 1993
- Genre: Scrolling shooter
- Mode: Single-player

Walker is a horizontally scrolling shooter video game developed by DMA Design and published by Psygnosis for the Amiga in February 1993. The player controls a bipedal mech and is tasked with killing advancing enemies in stages set in multiple time periods. Development of the game began after the release of Blood Money, but was scrapped in 1990 because the game was not coming together. By the end of the year, development had recommenced with a redesign, inspired by sprites originally intended for Blood Money. Ian Dunlop and Neill Glancy designed the game, and Raymond Usher wrote its soundtrack. The game was released to positive reviews with praise directed at the game's graphics and sound, but reviewers were critical towards the repetitiveness of the gameplay. Amiga Power ranked it among their top 100 Amiga games of 1993.

== Gameplay ==
In the game, the player controls a bipedal mech to advance through the several stages and defend against enemies, who attempt to lower the mech's shields.

Walker is a horizontal side-scrolling shooter that utilises 2D computer graphics. The player controls a bipedal mech to advance through the game's four stages, each consisting of two levels: 1944 Berlin, 2019 Los Angeles, contemporary Middle East, and 2420 Earth during "The Great War". Throughout the levels, the player uses the mech's machine guns to defeat waves of enemy infantry, tanks, and airships; the player advances to the next level upon killing all enemies. When the mech's guns are fired, the temperature indicator rises; when overheated, the guns must cool down over a short time before further use. The player has the ability to lock-on to enemies with their missiles. The mech's shield acts as the player's health and is depleted when enemies attack the mech. When the mech is destroyed, the player loses a life; when all three lives are lost, the game ends. At the end of each level, the player must defeat a boss. Unlike most side-scrolling games, Walker is controlled from right to left. The game features two difficulty levels: easy and arcade. Only the first two stages are playable in easy mode.

== Development ==
DMA Design founder David Jones began developing Walker following the release of Blood Money in 1989. The inspiration for the game's mech originated in a sprite from Lemmings (1991) originally designed for Blood Money. The graphics and animation for Walker were designed by Scott Johnston, who later worked on Hired Guns (1993). Johnston, a freelancer at the time, wrote a small program to correctly render the walker's head in position, which could then be altered in Deluxe Paint. In early 1990, Jones scrapped Walker because the design was not coming together, and began development on a new game called Gore!; this was soon scrapped. Following the completion of the Commodore 64 and TurboGrafx-16 ports of Shadow of the Beast, Jones hired Ian Dunlop and Neill Glancy to continue working on Walker; Glancy redesigned the game. Raymond Usher wrote the game's soundtrack.

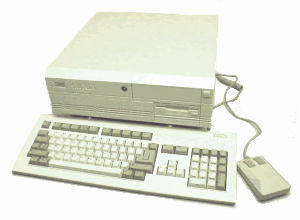
When played on advanced Amiga systems, such as the Amiga 4000 (pictured), Walker has additional features, such as a speech between the player's mech and its headquarters.

Dunlop had been seeking contract work when he was hired by Jones. Glancy was working at a computer shop in Scotland when he met Dunlop, who was working on Walker at the time. "I had been working on pixel art games and projects for some years so offered to create an entire set of level graphics for the game", Glancy said. The Terminator (1984) and Akira (1988) influenced Glancy's design work, which he described as "the most complex pixel graphics [he] had ever made", due to the addition of motion blur and dynamic lighting. While Jones was impressed by Glancy's designs, he selected alternative designs by the art department at DMA Design because Glancy was not an employee.

Dunlop found that the large scale of the game necessitated small enemies, which were partly inspired by the characters of Lemmings. The game's control scheme consisted of a mouse controlling the guns and a keyboard or joystick controlling the mech's movements. Dunlop explained that this allowed the player to maintain freedom of the weapons while simultaneously moving the mech and felt that it "gave the gameplay a bit more depth and interest". In regards to the game's side-scrolling, the team took inspiration from their 1988 game Menace. When played on advanced Amiga models, Walker included a speech between the mech and its headquarters that had been recorded by Dunlop and Glancy over walkie-talkie.

The game's original concept included an underground base that connected all of the levels, but this element was scrapped by publisher Psygnosis due to financial constraints. Several additional levels were also cut from the game due to time restrictions, including one inspired by Prince of Persia (1989). Following Walker's launch in February 1993, Dunlop began working on a port for the Mega Drive, which was cancelled shortly thereafter. Glancy was also recruited to work on a sequel, Walker 2, which would have overhauled the visual quality of the first game and include a customisable mech. Planned for release on the 3DO Interactive Multiplayer, it was eventually cancelled.

== Reception ==
Reception

Review scores
Publication	Score
Amiga Action	89%
Amiga Computing	87%
Amiga Force	73%
Amiga Format	81%
Amiga Power	85%
CU Amiga	82%
The One Amiga	81%

Walker received positive reviews from critics upon release. Reviewers particularly directed praise at the game's graphics and sound design, though the gameplay was met with mixed reactions. James Price of Amiga Force named it "one of the most satisfying shoot-'em-ups", while Amiga Computing's Paul Roundell wrote that the developers "managed to combine the best elements of several games". The game received the "Amiga Action Accolade" from Amiga Action and was ranked 58th in Amiga Power's top 100 games of 1993.

Critics praised the game's graphical qualities. Amiga Computing's Roundell described the mech animation as "a pleasure to watch", and Amiga Force's Price called it "flawlessly animated". Mark Winstanley of Amiga Power praised the enemy animation, writing that he had "never seen ... soldiers die so needlessly and gratuitously". Andy Nuttall of Amiga Format applauded the game's subtle use of scrolling backgrounds. CU Amiga's Dan Slingsby found that the design of the military hardware was particularly pleasing. While David Upchurch of The One Amiga admired the mech's animation, he found that it "looks more like a mechanical chicken than a vicious killing machine".

The game's use of sound also garnered praise. Alan Bunker of Amiga Action wrote that the developers "realised the importance of sound and perfected it". CU Amiga's Slingsby found that the game's sound effects complemented the action of the gameplay. Amiga Power's Winstanley praised each element of the sound design, particularly lauding the subtle inclusions, such as music from enemy radios. Nuttall of Amiga Format felt that the developers dedicated "a lot of attention" to the game's sound design.

Reviewers were satisfied with the gameplay, though most were critical of the lack of variation. Roundell of Amiga Computing noted that the variety and speed of enemies ensures engaging gameplay. The One Amiga's Upchurch wrote that the game is "not ... for the faint-hearted". Price of Amiga Force described the controls as "rather innovative", though criticised the longevity of gameplay due to lack of variation. Amiga Format's Nuttall echoed similar remarks, noting the repetitiveness of gameplay. In a 2014 review, Graeme Virtue of Eurogamer felt that the right-to-left movement made the game memorable.
