= Blood Money (video game) =

1989 video game

- Cover art by Peter Andrew Jones
- Developer: DMA Design
- Publisher: Psygnosis
- Programmer: David Jones
- Artist: Tony Smith
- Composers: Ray Norrish; Fredrik Segergalk
- Platforms: Amiga, Atari ST, MS-DOS, Commodore 64
- Release: 19 April 1989: Amiga; EU: 19 April 1989; NA: May 1989; Atari ST; EU: June 1989; NA: September 1989; MS-DOS; EU: June 1989; NA: December 1989; Commodore 64; EU: June 1990; NA: Q3 1990
- Genre: Side-scrolling shooter
- Modes: Single-player, multiplayer

Blood Money is a 1989 side-scrolling shooter video game developed by DMA Design and published by Psygnosis. It was released for the Amiga, Atari ST, and MS-DOS in 1989, and for the Commodore 64 in 1990. The game is set in four locations on a planet, where the player must fight off enemies and bosses.

The game began development immediately after Menace, and borrowed similar gameplay elements. The development team used advanced hardware to develop Blood Money, using improved graphical and technological processes. The game was inspired by the presentation of Mr. Heli, and the animations of Blood Money would later inspire the development of Lemmings. The game was released to positive reviews; praise was given to the game's graphics and gameplay. The game was commercially successful, selling over 40,000 copies.

== Gameplay ==
The player's ship (left) shooting at two large enemies

Blood Money is a 2D side-scrolling shooter. The player moves through four stages on the planet, taking control of a different vehicle in each level: a helicopter in the metal world, a submarine in a water world, a spacesuit in an ice world, and a fighter jet in a fire world. Each vehicle features unique weaponry, which the player uses to attack all advancing enemies. The player can upgrade their vehicle with power-ups, which grant them additional weapons and upgrades, such as support missiles and neutron bombs.

The vehicles' energy acts as the player's health, and is depleted when the vehicle makes contact with enemies and walls. When all energy is lost, the player loses a life; three lives are provided at the beginning of the game, and additional lives can be bought in a shop at certain points in the levels. Money for the shop can be collected when destroying enemies. When all three lives are lost, the game ends and the player is sent to a score result screen. The first two levels may be selected from the beginning of the game; after one level is complete, the player can select any remaining world without restrictions. At the end of each level, the player must defeat a boss.

== Development ==
Following the successful release of Menace in 1988, David Jones began developing Blood Money on 4 January 1989, on the 25 MHz 386-DX computer that publisher Psygnosis granted him, alongside a personal development system. Jones saw Blood Money as a continuation of the concept used in Menace. Jones was heavily inspired by the "cuteness" of Mr. Heli (1987) during the development of Blood Money. The game's cover art was designed by British artist Peter Andrew Jones for the novel Protector (1973) by Larry Niven, and was adapted for the game's cover.

With Blood Money, Jones was determined to use the full colour range of the Amiga, opting to use the blitter as opposed to the hardware scrolling; the blitter allowed graphics to be drawn quickly. Tony Smith, who had worked on Menace, produced the graphics for Blood Money, while Jones began work on a new scrolling system. While developing his own game, Talisman, Mike Dailly created a compact method to move enemies on-screen, which Jones incorporated into Blood Money. The game's animations fascinated Jones's friend Gary Timmons, who then began experimenting with Deluxe Paint; his work on the program led to his employment at DMA Design, and inspired some of the animations used in DMA's next game, Walker (1993). The game's introduction required a star field, which Jones took from a quick demonstration that Dailly had been working on.

Blood Money was released for the Amiga on 19 April 1989 in Europe, and in May in North America. Jones's friend Wayne Smithson developed a port for the Atari ST, while Creative Assembly's Tim Ansell ported the game to MS-DOS; both were released in June 1989 in Europe, and in September and December, respectively, in North America. Video game musician Matt Furniss claimed that a conversion for the Sega Mega Drive was once in development with its music complete.

Dailly began porting the game to the Commodore 64 following the Personal Computer World Show in September 1989, using the code from the Talisman demo and writing a new sprite system. He re-worked the multi-directional scrolling, and wrote his own tape loading routines, allowing the player to play a simple game while Blood Money loaded. Smith, who designed the port's graphics, was confused by the hardware limitations, forced to draw double pixels in Deluxe Paint and being limited to sixteen colours. Dailly finished developing the Commodore 64 version on 12 March 1990, and it was released in June in Europe and the third quarter of 1990 in North America.

== Reception ==
Reception

Review scores
Publication	Score
Computer and Video Games	(AMI, PC) 85% (ST) 84% (C64) 79%
ACE	(ST) 740/1000 (PC) 700/1000
CU Amiga	(AMI) 76%
The Games Machine	(AMI) 90%
The One	(AMI) 74%
ST Format	(ST) 90%
ST/Amiga Format	(AMI) 92%
Zzap!64	(AMI) 94%

Blood Money received mostly positive reviews from critics upon release. ST/Amiga Format's Gary Barrett considered it the best shoot 'em up game on the Amiga. Zzap!64's Stuart Wynne listed Blood Money as the best Amiga game of the 1980s, and ST Format named it the second-best shoot 'em up game of 1990. It won Best Action/Arcade-Style Game from Computer Entertainer. The game sold 40,000 copies, doubling Menace's sales.

Stuart Wynne of Zzap!64 found the game convenient, while Robin Hogg of the same publication wrote that it equals to the game's detailed graphics. The One's Brian Nesbitt viewed the game as among the more difficult and technologically sophisticated shoot 'em ups, while ACE called it "compelling". Conversely, Mike Pattenden of CU Amiga criticised the difficulty, noting its lack of rewards.

The One's Gary Whitta lauded the game's "tongue-in-cheek style", particularly in Smith's art. Computer and Video Games's Paul Glancey appreciated the opening sequence and called the sprites among "the best designed and most fluidly animated" in an Amiga game. The Games Machine believed the graphics were very advanced, and ST/Amiga Format's Barrett wrote that the game is "in a class of its own", praising the sprite animations. Zzap!64's Hogg commended the animation and backgrounds. Conversely, CU Amiga's Pattenden felt the graphics lack depth.

The game's use of sound received positive reactions. Phil King of Zzap!64 was impressed by the soundtrack, particularly praising the introductory music. The Games Machine echoed similar remarks, writing that the game features "excellent" audio, and Glancey of Computer and Video Games wrote that the sound chip was heavily utilised. Barrett of ST/Amiga Format preferred the sound effects over the music, though felt that they were inferior to those in Menace. Pattenden of CU Amiga felt that the sound is "a poor tune and some average effects", while ACE called it "a little weedy".
