= Rockstar North =

British video game developer

Rockstar Games UK Limited

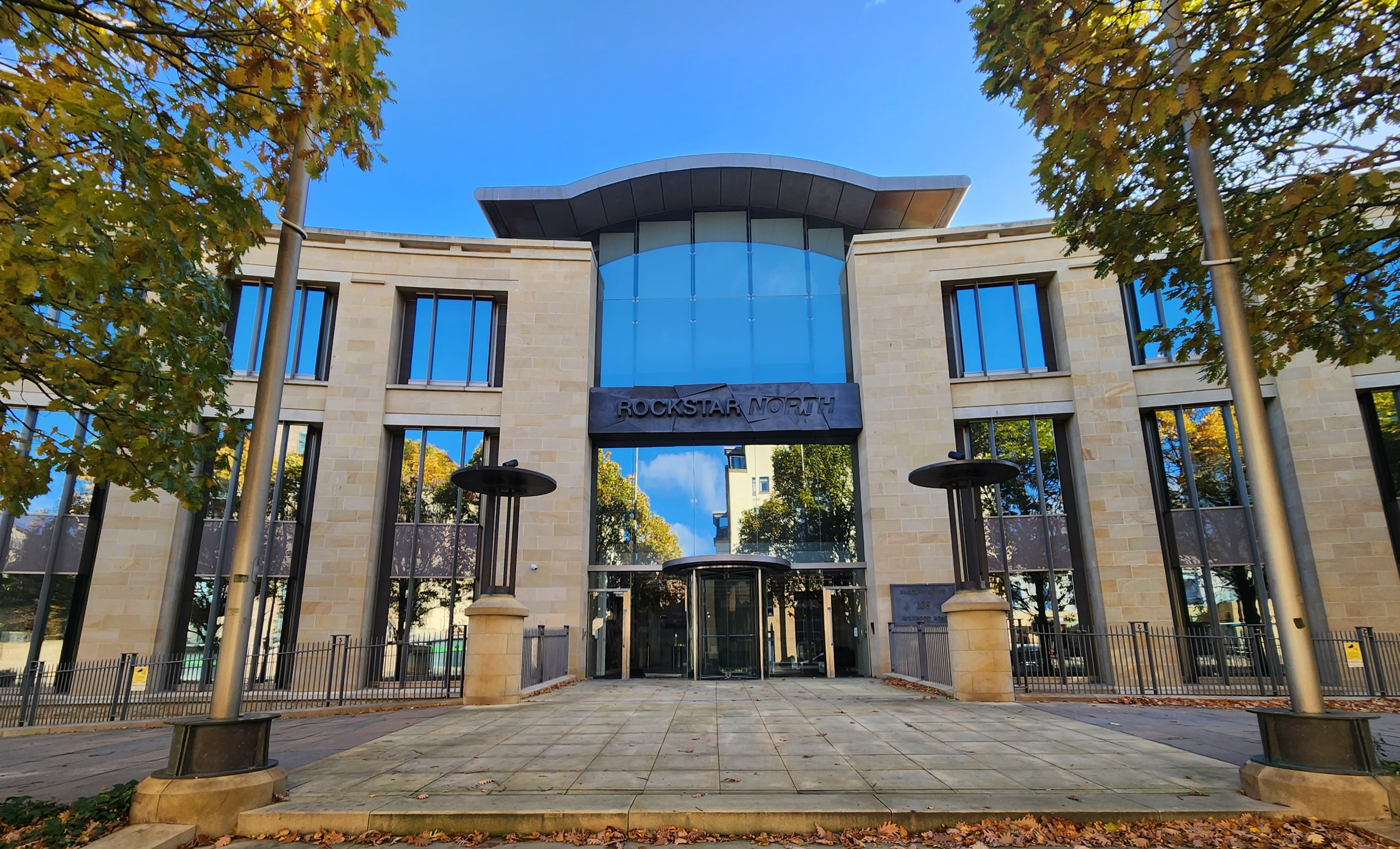
- Headquarters at Barclay House, Edinburgh (pictured in 2023)
- Trade name: Rockstar North
- Formerly: DMA Design Limited (1988–2002); Rockstar Studios Limited (2002); Rockstar North Limited (2002–2021)
- Type: Subsidiary
- Industry: Video games
- Founded: 1988; 38 years ago in Dundee, Scotland
- Founder: David Jones
- Headquarters: Edinburgh, Scotland
- Key people: Andrew Semple (studio director); Aaron Garbut (co-studio head); Rob Nelson (co-studio head)
- Products: Lemmings series (1991–1994); Grand Theft Auto series (1997–present)
- Number of employees: 650 (2018)
- Parent: Gremlin Interactive (1997–1999); Take-Two Interactive (1999–2002); Rockstar Games (2002–present)
- Website: rockstarnorth.com

Rockstar North (Rockstar Games UK Limited; formerly DMA Design Limited) is a British video game developer and a studio of Rockstar Games based in Edinburgh. The studio is best known for creating the Lemmings and Grand Theft Auto series, including Grand Theft Auto V, the second-best-selling game and most profitable entertainment product of all time.

David Jones founded the company as DMA Design in 1988 in his hometown of Dundee. During his studies, he had developed the game Menace and struck a six-game publishing deal with Psygnosis, which released Jones's project in October 1988. While making its sequel, Blood Money, Jones dropped out and hired several of his friends, including Mike Dailly, Steve Hammond, and Russell Kay, with whom he had attended the Kingsway Amateur Computer Club. They opened the company's first offices above a former fish and chip shop in 1989. Following the successful 1991 release of Lemmings, the studio rapidly expanded and moved into proper offices, after which Kay left to establish Visual Sciences. Several Lemmings expansions and sequels later, 1994's All New World of Lemmings was DMA Design's final game in the series and its last with Psygnosis.

After many halted projects from partnerships with Nintendo and BMG Interactive, Jones sold the financially stricken studio to Gremlin Interactive in April 1997. The subsequent spin-off of DMA Design's American satellite studio triggered Hammond's departure. While the commercially successful release of Grand Theft Auto led Take-Two Interactive to buy the game's intellectual property and form Rockstar Games in 1998, Body Harvest's underperformance later that year saw Gremlin Interactive being taken over by Infogrames. In September 1999, Infogrames sold DMA Design to Take-Two, enabling a close collaboration with Rockstar Games to release Grand Theft Auto 2. Amid these changes, Dailly left for Visual Sciences, while Jones founded Denki and Real Time Worlds.

A few months after an Edinburgh branch was established for DMA Design, the prior Dundee location was closed. Grand Theft Auto III, the first Grand Theft Auto game presented fully in 3D, was released in 2001 and sold 6 million units in one year. Considered genre-defining, the game gave rise to a number of Grand Theft Auto clones. Take-Two integrated DMA Design with Rockstar Games as Rockstar Studios in March 2002, which was renamed Rockstar North in May. Since then, the studio has continued the Grand Theft Auto series with Grand Theft Auto: Vice City (2002), Grand Theft Auto: San Andreas (2004), Grand Theft Auto IV (2008), and Grand Theft Auto V (2013), as well as a number of smaller games in the franchise. Rockstar North also created Manhunt in 2003 and collaborated with other Rockstar Games studios on Manhunt 2 (2007), Red Dead Redemption (2010), L.A. Noire (2011), Max Payne 3 (2012), Red Dead Redemption 2 (2018), Grand Theft Auto VI (2026).

== History ==
=== Background and formation (1983–1988) ===
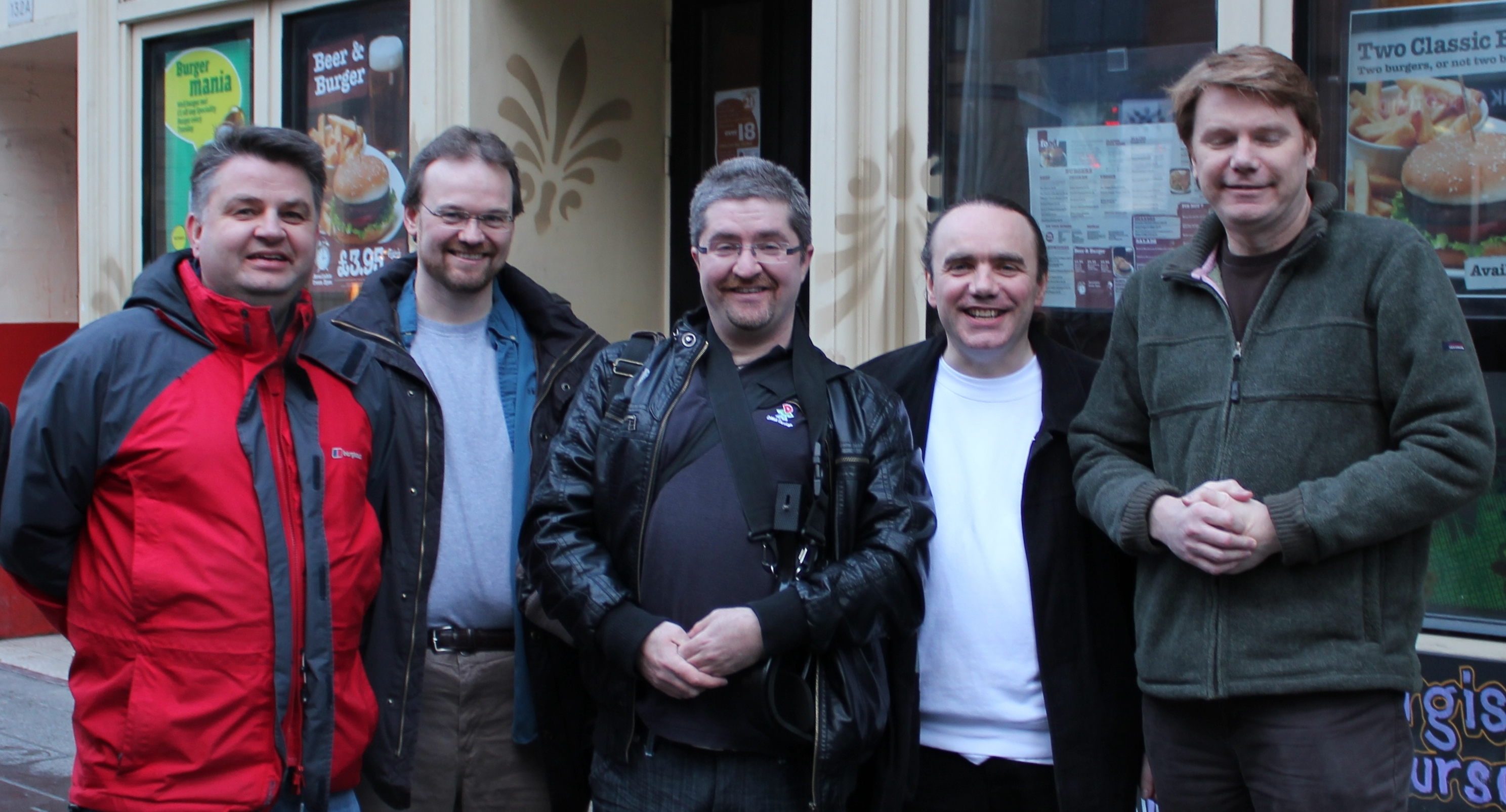
Among the core members of the early DMA Design team were (from left to right) Russell Kay, Mike Dailly, Steve Hammond, Gary Timmons, and David Jones (pictured in 2011).

Rockstar North was founded as DMA Design by the Dundee native David Jones. Having frequently played Space Invaders in his youth, he gained early programming knowledge when his secondary school, Linlathen High, obtained an Apple II computer and piloted O-level qualifications in computer studies. In 1983, he took up an apprenticeship at the local plant of the electronics manufacturer Timex. Although the company was best known for producing watches, the Dundee factory also built home computers for Sinclair Research, including the ZX81 and ZX Spectrum, which had boosted interest in hobbyist programming in the area. Timex paid for programming courses at the local Kingsway Technical College, which also hosted the Kingsway Amateur Computer Club (KACC). Jones, the oldest attendee at the KACC, soon befriended Steve Hammond and Russell Kay. Mike Dailly, the youngest participant at 14, joined the club at the recommendation of a friend in 1984 with the Plus/4 he had received for Christmas. The quartet bonded over their shared interest in creating original games instead of playing or cloning existing ones.

During their time at the KACC, Dailly and Hammond developed Freek Out for the Plus/4, which they finished and sold to the publisher Cascade for "a modest fee", while Jones and Kay cooperated on Moonshadow for the ZX Spectrum, which was eventually released as Zone Trooper. Jones and Dailly also worked on The Game With No Name. As Sinclair Research's market share dropped significantly during 1986, Timex enacted layoffs in Dundee. Jones accepted a voluntary redundancy for £3,000, a roughly half-year salary that he invested into an Amiga 1000, and subsequently enrolled in computer science at the Dundee Institute of Technology (DIT). Hammond also attended the DIT, and all four soon joined its computer club. Because Jones easily passed the course's first year, he had much time to learn to program for the Amiga and spent one year creating the shoot 'em up CopperCon1. Working out of his parents' bedroom, he provisionally used the moniker "Acme". The game featured graphics by the demoscene member Tony Smith, with whom he communicated by post, and sounds Dailly and Hammond recorded from a Salamander machine at a local arcade.

After courting publishers at the Personal Computer World Show, Jones initially agreed to a publishing deal with Hewson Consultants but, fearing that his game would merely become the Amiga version of Zynaps, he walked away from the agreement. Instead, he turned to the nascent Psygnosis in 1987 and agreed to a six-game publishing deal. CopperCon1 was renamed Draconia, which was ultimately changed to Menace because the name was too similar to that of Draconus. Jones also agreed to bring Psygnosis's Ballistix from the Amiga to the Commodore 64, for which he engaged Dailly and Hammond. In his search for a company name to replace the already taken "Acme", Jones discussed alternatives with the members of the DIT's computer club in 1988. Among others, "Milliard", "Visual Voyage", and "Alias Smith and Jones" (in reference to Menace's artist) were floated, and Jones finally settled on "DMA Design". The abbreviation "DMA" stood for "direct memory access" in Amiga manuals but carried no meaning in the company name. While "Direct Mind Access" was official briefly, Jones eventually began stating that the abbreviation was short for "Doesn't Mean Anything". He formally founded DMA Design in 1988, when he was 22 years old.

=== Initial games with Psygnosis and Lemmings (1988–1994) ===
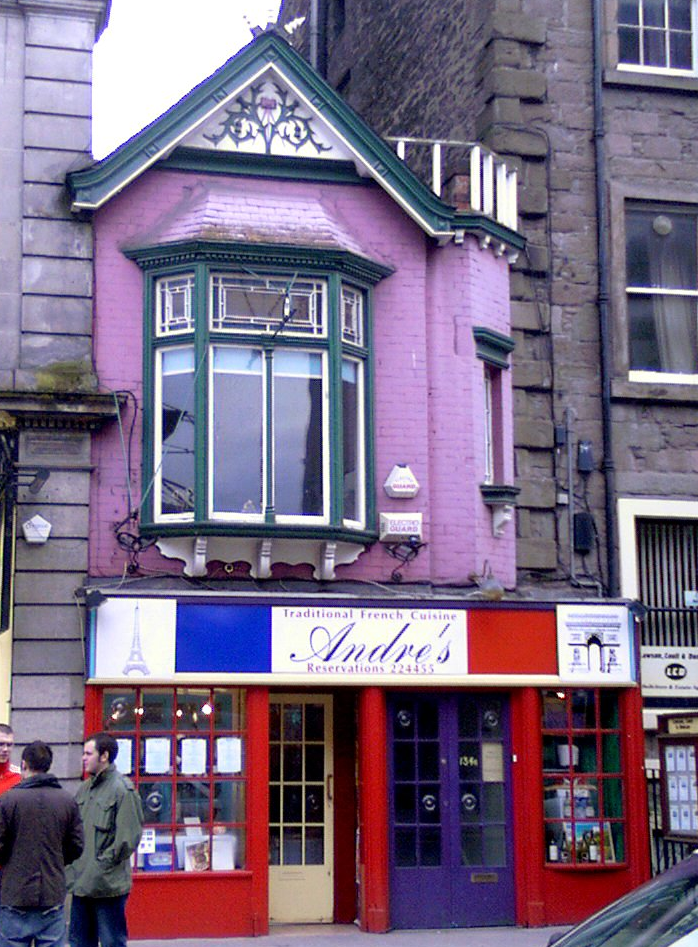
DMA Design inaugurated its first offices on 134B Nethergate in Dundee (top; pictured in 2005) in August 1989. A plaque commemorating the twentieth anniversary of Lemmings was installed in February 2011.

Menace was released in October 1988 after 18 months of development. It was DMA Design's debut game and the first game under Psygnosis's Psyclapse label for budget-priced games. Jones only received £0.75 for every copy sold, which he retrospectively viewed as a "terrible" deal. Still, the 20,000 sales allowed him to buy a car and regularly visit the Psygnosis offices to meet other game developers. While working on a sequel to Menace, the difficulty of Jones's university programme spiked, leading him to drop out and pursue game development full-time, against the advice of his professors. He intended to return after one year but never finished his studies, eventually receiving an honorary degree. Jones hired Dailly, who had just been expelled from college, as the first employee in 1989. Dailly began working on a Commodore 64 conversion of Menace. Hammond joined second on a part-time basis as he continued his education, followed shortly by Kay and Brian Watson, one of Jones's university friends. The Menace sequel, Blood Money, was released in April 1989. It sold 40,000 copies. Gary Timmons joined the studio shortly after the game was completed, while Dailly developed its Commodore 64 version and began working on a PC Engine port of Shadow of the Beast for Psygnosis. DMA Design also made Shadow of the Beast's Commodore 64 port and the PC Engine and MS-DOS versions for Ballistix.

Jones's father-in-law, the owner of the Dundee fish and chip shop The Deep Sea, lent him a small office space above the shop's former location at 134B Nethergate in Dundee. The infill building, built in 1893, is sometimes called the Wee Pink Nethergate House. The office was inaugurated on 1 August 1989. The studio continued to expand, also hiring many students to work part-time. In 1990, DMA Design cancelled several projects: The Golden Axe-inspired Gore! was shelved due to technical restrictions of the Amiga at the time and the platformer Cutiepoo did not make adequate progress after one year of work by the freelance programmer Tony Colgan. Jones further put aside his game Walker as he found he could not achieve his vision for it and stopped working on the Monster Cartridge, a cheat cartridge for the Amiga, after another such product was released first.

Working remotely from Edinburgh, the programmer Ian Dunlop and artist Neill Glancy began to experiment with the technology from Walker. When Dailly learned that they were working with characters just sixteen pixels tall, he challenged himself to create characters that were recognisable at half the height. During one lunch break, he animated a demo of small characters walking in a line and being killed comically, to the amusement of the office. Kay remarked that a game could be created from this. Jones concurred and thought of a design in which the player should prevent the characters from being killed. Kay wrote a demo before it was passed on to Dailly and later to Jones, who worked out the gameplay foundations with Timmons. The game was named Lemmings upon Kay's suggestion and released in February 1991. It sold 55,000 copies on its first day and was swiftly brought to other regions and platforms. Jon Dye, another former KACC attendee, was hired later that year to bring the game to the ZX Spectrum.

Lemmings had 20 million lifetime sales across 21 platforms. At 25 years old, Jones became a millionaire and subsequently bought multiple luxury cars. The company rapidly expanded and began working on several additional projects. As Psygnosis sought DMA Design to produce Lemmings expansion packs and sequels in the wake of this success, the studio developed Oh No! More Lemmings (1991), Lemmings 2: The Tribes (1993), and All New World of Lemmings (1994). It also made the Christmas-themed Holiday Lemmings to be distributed for free on covermounts in 1991 and 1992, before Psygnosis made it a commercial release for 1993 and 1994.

By November 1992, DMA Design had grown to 22 staff, including 10 former classmates of Jones, and relocated to proper offices at the Dundee Technology Park. As Kay left DMA Design in 1993 to form Visual Sciences, Jones and Dailly hired Keith Hamilton as a replacement and put him in charge of All New World of Lemmings. This entry focused on larger, more detailed lemmings, which Hamilton and Jones later believed diminished the game's charm. In the same year, Psygnosis released the Amiga-exclusive Walker and Hired Guns, which had been created principally by Scott Johnston with a story by Hammond. All New World of Lemmings was the final game in Jones's original deal with Psygnosis. With the studio experiencing fatigue for the Lemmings series, Psygnosis hired other developers for subsequent entries, including Kay and Visual Sciences for Lemmings Paintball.

=== Partnerships with Nintendo and BMG Interactive (1994–1997) ===
After leaving Lemmings behind, DMA Design began researching development for the 3DO. In another project, Psygnosis briefly had DMA Design emulate an in-development Star Wars game on the Super Nintendo Entertainment System (SNES). During one trade show, Jones caught the attention of Nintendo with a full-motion video Star Wars clip running on the SNES, something previously believed impossible. At the time, the company was seeking development partners for its upcoming Nintendo 64 console, which was then called Project Reality. DMA Design signed a two-game contract—worth several million pounds—and joined Nintendo's "Dream Team" of external partners. When this partnership was announced in April 1994, DMA Design was only Nintendo's second partner for the platform. Using these funds, the studio grew to occupy 2,500 square feet (230 m^{2}) of office space at the Dundee Technology Park and spent around £250,000 outfitting all rooms with high-end devices. The partnership also led DMA Design to cease developing for the 3DO. The studio steered clear of other consoles, like the PlayStation and Sega Saturn, because Jones disliked "multiformat publishing for the sake of it".

DMA Design's first project for Nintendo was Unirally, a racing game featuring animated unicycles created using 2D sprites rendered from a 3D model. Following the game's 1994 release for the SNES, the animation studio Pixar sued Nintendo over perceived similarities between the game's characters and the unicycle protagonist from Pixar's 1987 animated short film Red's Dream. The judge ruled in Pixar's favour and the two companies agreed that Nintendo would cease the production of Unirally copies while Pixar was to receive a Nintendo 64 game development kit. Despite the ruling, the game sold 300,000 copies. DMA Design continued working with Nintendo on Kid Kirby, a spin-off in Nintendo's Kirby franchise made by Colgan after requesting a second chance from Jones. The game featured a young version of the title character, who would have been launched around levels using the Super NES Mouse. In November 1994, a team of five people commenced developing Body Harvest, scheduled to be a launch title for the Nintendo 64.

In the meantime, Dailly was experimenting with ways to render 3D buildings from a top-down perspective. To showcase this technology, he devised a game that saw the player control a dinosaur and destroy the city. After adding cars to make the scene more lively, a colleague suggested having the player drive these cars instead. Jones took notice of Dailly's project and passed it to a team that should turn it into a game. In July 1993, The Liaison and Promotion Company began handling the marketing for DMA Design and its games, and it introduced the studio to potential partners for the project. Jones consequently presented a prototype of the game, which became known as Race'n'Chase, to BMG Interactive, the recently formed games arm of Bertelsmann. The two companies signed a £3.4 million contract in March 1995, wherein the studio would develop four games for the publisher. According to The Liaison and Promotion Company, Jones had not informed the firm of the impending deal, instead claiming he would partner with another company, such as Virgin Interactive Entertainment. DMA Design and The Liaison and Promotion Company then severed ties just before the deal with BMG Interactive had been finalised, and this became a legal dispute when DMA Design refused to pay the marketing firm.

The publishing agreement with BMG Interactive covered Race'n'Chase, Space Station Silicon Valley, Tanktics, and the stealth game Covert. With the acquired funds, DMA Design intended to expand its offices and increase its 40-strong headcount, quickly growing to 130 people. The company took over an additional 5,000 square feet (460 m^{2}) of office space and expanded to two adjacent buildings, therein also setting up a £500,000 motion capture studio that found little usage. Another section housed DMA Music with seven full-time musicians. Race'n'Chase formally began production in March 1995. The development team consisted mostly of recent graduates with little development experience, with Hamilton as the lead programmer. As such, the unorganised team struggled with the development until Gary Penn moved from BMG Interactive to DMA Design as the game's creative director and producer. BMG Interactive's production team, including the head of development Sam Houser, was hands-off during the development.

Body Harvest progressed slowly and faced numerous delays, such that it missed its intended launch with the Nintendo 64. The production also stalled on Kid Kirby and the climbing-themed action game Zenith, and Nintendo cancelled the former following the low sales of the Super NES Mouse. Furthermore, the American division of BMG Interactive regularly pushed for Race'n'Chase to be cancelled because the team kept missing development milestones. As the studio continued work on multiple games, several staffers believed Body Harvest would be a bigger hit. With DMA Design struggling financially, Jones kept agreeing to game projects solely to receive sign-on bonuses and with no plans to complete them. At one point, the studio had seven or eight projects in development at the same time. In the latter half of 1996, GT Interactive signed with DMA Design for Attack! and Clan Wars, despite neither draft having a proper team assigned. Jones also sold the rights to Grand Theft Auto to BMG Interactive to help keep the studio afloat. In November 1996, DMA Design opened a satellite studio in Boulder, Colorado. Anthony Harman was installed as the studio's manager, and it had 27 employees by April 1997.

=== Sale to Gremlin Interactive (1997) ===
Games will always be here. ... If you do good games, they'll always sell well. What I like is that people are not daft anymore. ... There was a time when you could sell anything in this business. Anything. That was more disappointing – when the business was bigger it was because of that. Times are hard now, making people focus more on quality and innovation which is great.

— David Jones, founder of DMA Design, 1997

The development on Body Harvest stalled under the conflicting demands between the Japanese and American branches of Nintendo. The team sought to keep up its relationship with Nintendo and caved in to these demands. Despite stark changes to the game's design, Nintendo was dissatisfied with the result and cancelled the game. Still in financial disarray and wanting his company to focus on game development, Jones arranged for Gremlin Interactive to acquire DMA Design for £4.2 million in April 1997. The publisher was impressed with DMA Design's multi-use 3DMA game engine and wanted the two companies to cooperate on research and development. It also expected DMA Design to become profitable within two years of the acquisition. Gremlin Interactive introduced several project management methods—including Microsoft Project and Gantt charts—that the studio perceived as unnecessary bureaucracy. Additionally, the company made DMA Design finish games as quickly as possible, as opposed to Jones's prior methodology of releasing a game only once it is good. Jones received a 5% stake in Gremlin Interactive and became a member of its board of directors. He subsequently moved into the creative director role for DMA Design. In May, the studio had 100 employees.

DMA Design's satellite studio in Boulder, Colorado, was based near the Devil's Thumb rock formation it was later named after (pictured in 1996).

As another result of the acquisition, the Boulder studio was spun off as a separate company. Under Harman's continued leadership, it was renamed Devil's Thumb Entertainment. The Boulder studio had been developing a remake of Hired Guns for Psygnosis with Hammond as the writer. Being more passionate about this project than Grand Theft Auto, he left DMA Design to work on the remake in a freelance position, which he later said he regretted "ever since". Devil's Thumb Entertainment also developed Mike Piazza's StrikeZone and Tides of War for GT Interactive. In March 1999, the studio was acquired and absorbed by the developer VR-1, also based in Boulder. The Hired Guns remake was never released.

Two months after DMA Design's acquisition, Gremlin Interactive became a public company on the London Stock Exchange. Jones's stake in the company was valued at £55 million at the time. Meanwhile, Bertelsmann had decided to withdraw from the video game industry and shut down the American division of BMG Interactive. In its place, the release in North America was licensed to ASC Games. Gremlin Interactive also picked up the rights to Body Harvest and engaged Midway Home Entertainment as the publisher in North America. For Tanktics, the North American publishing rights were sold to Interplay Entertainment. DMA Design further negotiated back the rights to Attack! and Clan Wars from GT Interactive.

By July 1997, The Liaison and Promotion Company had sued DMA Design for £1.5 million over breach of contract in relation to the deal with BMG Interactive. Lord Penrose, presiding over the case at the Court of Session, then opined that the marketing firm had been pivotal in the deal being reached and that DMA Design had taken a "rather cynical action" by excluding it from the negotiations, asserting that the actions did constitute breach of contract. Also in 1997, DMA Design became one of the founding members of the Scottish Game Alliance, alongside Visual Sciences and five other studios. Meanwhile, in November 1997, Jones helped the Dundee Institute of Technology (now called the University of Abertay Dundee) introduce an unprecedented computer games degree. In 1998, DMA Design developed games for a game design course at Dundee College.

=== Sale to Take-Two Interactive (1997–2000) ===
In the lead-up to the debut of Race'n'Chase, now renamed Grand Theft Auto, BMG Interactive hired the publicist Max Clifford, who wanted to use controversy to market the game. Baron Campbell of Croy warned of the game at the United Kingdom's House of Lords in May 1997, and several tabloid newspapers called for it to be banned in the country. Grand Theft Auto was released in November 1997 and, despite mixed reviews, quickly sold 500,000 units and generated £25 million. Visual Sciences developed the PlayStation port for Grand Theft Auto, which was largely programmed by Kay and produced by Houser. The success diminished the focus on other games, particularly Space Station Silicon Valley, and a sequel was soon approved. Bertelsmann decided to ramp down BMG Interactive to reduce costs. At the same time, the publisher Take-Two Interactive was looking to grow its business and invited Houser to discuss his vision for game development. As a result, Take-Two acquired BMG Interactive, since dormant, for 1.85 million shares worth US$14.2 million in March 1998. Through the acquisition, Take-Two also obtained the intellectual property of Grand Theft Auto and Space Station Silicon Valley, and it published the former's PlayStation version in North America later that year.

Houser subsequently moved over to Take-Two as its "vice president of worldwide product development", in charge of internal and external development studios. The company also incrementally purchased all individual publishing rights for Grand Theft Auto from other companies to hold the exclusive rights to the game worldwide. Body Harvest and Space Station Silicon Valley were released in late 1998 but were scarcely marketed, leading to meagre sales. Houser and some of his former BMG Interactive colleagues joined Take-Two to form the Rockstar Games publishing label in December 1998. The newborn company commissioned its internal studio, Rockstar Canada, to develop two expansions for the original game, Grand Theft Auto: London 1969 and Grand Theft Auto: London 1961, which were released in 1999.

In March 1999, the poor sales of Body Harvest contributed to dire financials at Gremlin Interactive that forced it into a £24 million takeover by the French publisher Infogrames. During this year, Dailly left the company to join Kay at Visual Sciences as its head of research and development. Under the new ownership, Gremlin Interactive published DMA Design's Wild Metal Country in May and Tanktics in June. However, as Infogrames focused on child-friendly games at the time, it did not wish to hold on to any assets related to Grand Theft Auto. Take-Two Interactive bought DMA Design from the publisher in September 1999 for the nominal price of £1 while assuming US$12.3 million in debt. DMA Design henceforth worked closely with Rockstar Games, which Houser described as a "perfect match". During these ownership and managerial changes, several projects were cancelled, including Attack!, Grand Theft Auto and Wild Metal Country for the Nintendo 64, and an Unreal version for the 64DD. At the time of Take-Two's acquisition, DMA Design was working on GTA 3D and Grand Theft Auto: Online Crime World.

Grand Theft Auto 2, published by Rockstar Games, was released in October 1999 and quickly sold more than 1 million copies, the first Take-Two game to do so. Shortly thereafter, DMA Design established a satellite studio in the Leith area of Edinburgh to house the former teams of Body Harvest and Space Station Silicon Valley. Among those who relocated there were Leslie Benzies, Aaron Garbut, and Obbe Vermeij, all of whom had worked on Space Station Silicon Valley. Under the direction of Andrew Semple, the branch launched with 25 people. While the Edinburgh location continued to develop a 3D Grand Theft Auto game, now modelled after Driver, the Dundee office was working on an expansion for Grand Theft Auto 2 set in Miami, of which the former was ultimately prioritised and became Grand Theft Auto III. Jones was the last member of the original DMA Design team to work on this game. However, unhappy with his studio's new overseas ownership, he departed the company in early 2000. With three other former DMA Design employees, he formed the game studio Denki. In February, alongside an investment in Denki, Rage Software hired Jones to oversee its operations in Scotland. Jones bought out Rage Software's Dundee studio in 2002 to form Real Time Worlds, which went on to hire many past DMA Design staffers. Benzies was soon appointed as the studio's development director and ultimately became its president.

Rockstar Games released a Dreamcast port of Wild Metal Country, renamed Wild Metal, in February 2000. Take-Two encouraged DMA Design to narrow its focus to fewer, larger game projects. Many staffers felt at odds with this shift, as it diminished the prior atmosphere they felt was driven by creativity. The publisher closed the Dundee studio in March 2000, relocating many of the 35 staffers to Edinburgh and laying off the rest. The move was to enable a merger between DMA Design, Rockstar Games, and Pixel Broadband Studios under the "Broadband Studios" name. The combined entity would have largely leveraged Pixel Broadband Studios's online game technology. Jim Woods, who had become the DMA Design's managing director by this time, resigned as he wished to stay in Dundee. The merger was ultimately abandoned, as was Grand Theft Auto: Online Crime World.

=== Grand Theft Auto trilogy and rebranding as Rockstar North (2000–2004) ===
The "DMA Man" was DMA Design's longest-running logo. Designed by Stewart Graham, it was adopted in 1994 after winning an internal design competition and replaced in 2001 for the release of Grand Theft Auto III.

During the development of Grand Theft Auto III, DMA Design again expanded rapidly, forming a core team of 20 people and engaging "dozens more" in some capacity. The total team encompassed 60 people. The team retained the focus on a mostly unconstrained open world from the prior two games while introducing fully 3D graphics and a third-person view. With much of the game planned out from the start, the development progressed smoothly, such that it was released for the PlayStation 2 in late 2001. The game sold 6 million copies within one year and more than 15 million in total, exceeding the development team's expectations. It was the best-selling game of 2001 and the second-best in 2002. Grand Theft Auto III's approach to 3D open worlds has been referred to as genre-defining and inspired a number of successful titles, also spawning the category of Grand Theft Auto clones, which includes The Simpsons: Hit & Run, True Crime: Streets of LA, Driver 3, and Saints Row.

Plans to outfit Grand Theft Auto III with an online multiplayer component were scrapped in favour of a follow-up, Grand Theft Auto: Vice City. Conceptualised as an expansion pack for Grand Theft Auto III, Rockstar Games made it a standalone product as its scope expanded. Vice City reused its predecessor's engine, such that the programmers were not engaged until six months before the end of the production, and lessons learned from the previous development cycle allowed the designers to plan features more efficiently. In the meantime, the programmers worked on bringing Grand Theft Auto III to personal computers. In March 2002, DMA Design was renamed Rockstar Studios, which Houser described as the studio's "final integration" with Rockstar Games. The name was revised to Rockstar North in May. Vice City was completed in one year and released in late 2002. For its work on the game, Rockstar North won the "best in-house development studio" and "creativity" awards at the first Develop Industry Excellence Awards in August 2003.

Following Vice City's release, Rockstar North began work on Z, a zombie survival game set on a Scottish island. The game repurposed code from Vice City and was in production for around one month before the concept lost traction at the studio. The studio's Manhunt, a stealth game, was released in 2003 after roughly three years in development. Due to its dark tone and focus on realistic violence, it was considered the studio's pet project, and most people at Rockstar Games wanted no part in it. Despite provoking controversy for its graphic depiction of violence, the game sold 1.5 million copies. Rockstar North further assisted Rockstar Vienna and later Rockstar London in the production of a sequel, Manhunt 2, which entered into production in January 2004.

Rockstar North's Grand Theft Auto: San Andreas was given one year of additional development time over Vice City, which allowed the team to rework core parts of the gameplay and visuals. It had a budget of less than $10 million. By the end of the game's production, Rockstar North had relocated to offices on Calton Square in Edinburgh. San Andreas was released in October 2004. In four days, the game generated $101 million and sold 2.1 million copies, 45% above Vice City's initial sales. Alongside several other year-end accolades, San Andreas was named the "game of the year" at the 2004 Spike Video Game Awards and 2005 Golden Joystick Awards. Grand Theft Auto III, Vice City, and San Andreas were bundled as Grand Theft Auto: The Trilogy in 2006. By 2008, they had amassed sales of 14.5 million, 17.5 million, and 21.5 million, respectively.

=== Grand Theft Auto IV, Grand Theft Auto V, and development collaborations (2004–2013) ===
After San Andreas, Rockstar North began producing Grand Theft Auto IV. At the same time, the studio commenced the production of a stealth game called Agent (codenamed Jimmy in reference to James Bond). A game with the same name and concept had previously been cancelled at the sister studio Rockstar San Diego, and Benzies was interested in furthering the idea. The studio was split evenly between the two projects, although Grand Theft Auto IV was soon prioritised over Agent. Although Agent was announced for the PlayStation 3 in 2009, its trademark was abandoned in 2018 and the listing was later removed from Rockstar Games's website. Meanwhile, Rockstar North worked closely with Rockstar Leeds on three Grand Theft Auto games for handheld game consoles: Liberty City Stories, Vice City Stories, and Chinatown Wars.

Grand Theft Auto IV's production encompassed 220 people at the studio and 1,000 worldwide. Benzies estimated the budget at $100 million. Upon its April 2008 release, Grand Theft Auto IV broke the record for the highest revenue for a game within one day at $310 million from 3.6 million copies sold. At the 2008 Spike Video Game Awards, the game won "game of the year" and earned Rockstar North a nomination for "best studio". The studio continued with two expansion packs—The Lost and Damned and The Ballad of Gay Tony —which were later bundled as Grand Theft Auto: Episodes from Liberty City. In the meantime, the studio contributed to Rockstar San Diego's Red Dead Redemption in 2010 and Team Bondi's L.A. Noire in 2011. For Max Payne 3 in 2012, Rockstar North assisted a number of other Rockstar Games studios collectively credited as "Rockstar Studios".

Immediately following the completion of Grand Theft Auto IV, Rockstar North began preliminary work on Grand Theft Auto V. Rockstar North's 360 employees formed the core of a worldwide team of 1,000 staff, including several other Rockstar Games studios. The core development took roughly three years, and the game was released in September 2013. The game broke the records for the best-selling and highest-grossing video game within one day and the fastest entertainment property to reach $1 billion in revenue at three days. With continuing sales and the success of its online multiplayer counterpart, Grand Theft Auto Online, the game grossed an estimated $6 billion by 2018, making it the most profitable entertainment product of all time. With 200 million copies sold as of March 2024, Grand Theft Auto V became the second-best-selling game ever, adding to the 425 million total sales for the series.

=== Continued expansion and leadership dispute (2014–2022) ===
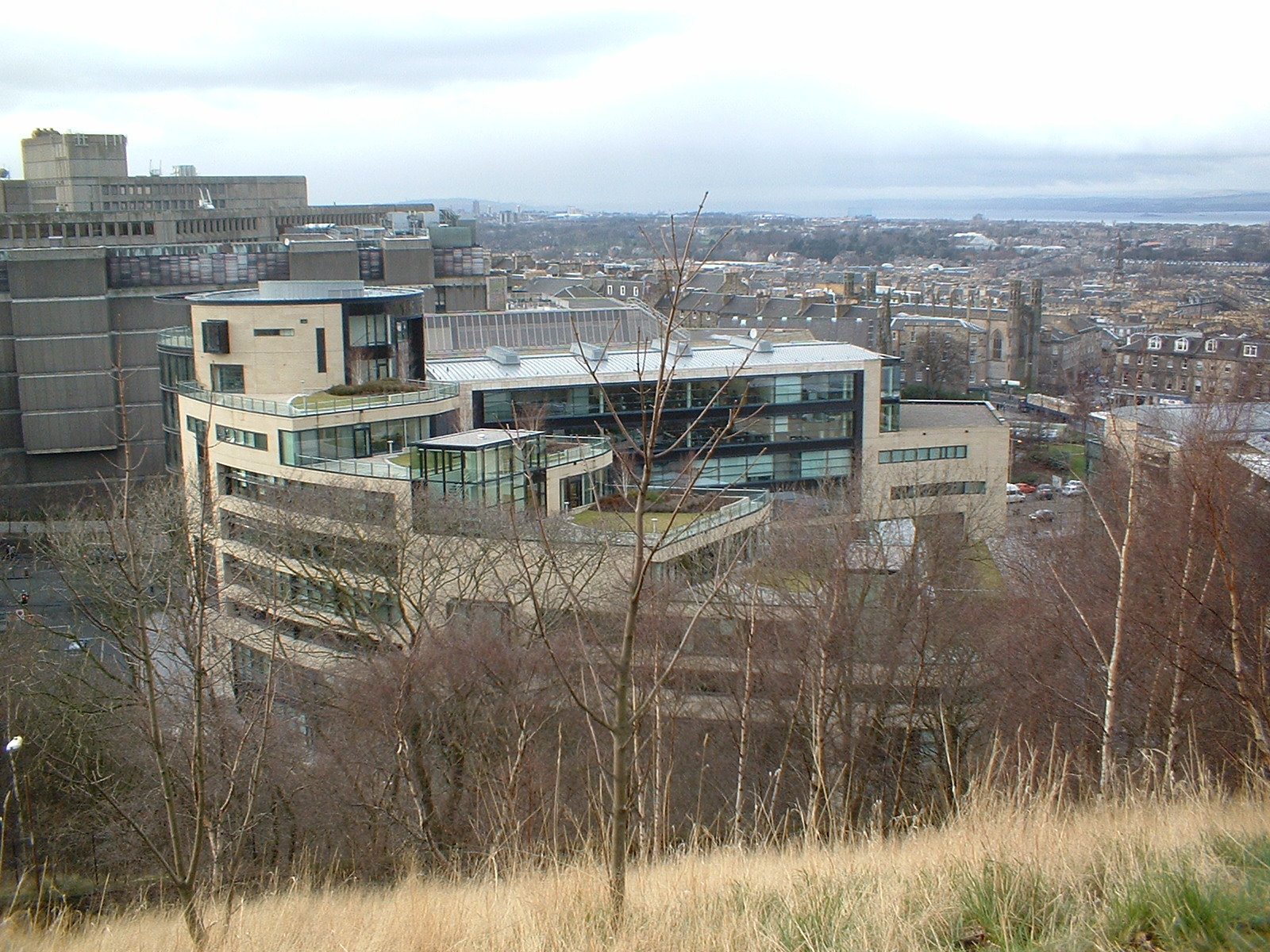
From 2004 to 2014, Rockstar North occupied offices at Calton Square, 1 Greenside Row, Edinburgh; at the foot of Calton Hill.

In 2014, Rockstar North took over 75,000 square feet (7,000 m^{2}) of office space in Barclay House on Holyrood Road in Edinburgh. The building had been constructed for the previous tenant, the newspaper group The Scotsman, in 1999. In the same year, the studio began receiving tax credits from the newly established Video Games Tax Relief system set up by the government of the United Kingdom. According to the investigative think tank TaxWatch UK, the studio had received £80 million by 2020, 37% of the system's total payout, while having not paid any corporation tax since 2009. In response, Rockstar Games stated that the tax credits had enabled higher investments into the country, while The Association for UK Interactive Entertainment reported that the system had brought about a fourfold return on investment for the British economy.

When Benzies went on a sabbatical in September 2014, his responsibilities as the studio head were picked up by Garbut and Rob Nelson, both art directors for the studio. He did not return, culminating in the announcement of his departure in January 2016. On 12 April 2016, Benzies sued Rockstar Games, Take-Two, Sam Houser, and Dan Houser, claiming that the companies had withheld $150 million in royalty payments following his departure. In the suit, he claimed that the Houser brothers had persuaded him to take a six-month sabbatical and fired his son and several friends during this absence. As Benzies tried to return after the planned end of his sabbatical in April 2015, his building access had been disabled and the office manager ordered him off the premises. The lawsuit stated that the three "Rockstar Principals"—himself and the Houser brothers—had established a shell corporation to evenly share profits and eventually leave Take-Two. Additionally, Benzies accused Sam Houser of having built a sexually charged culture at Rockstar Games and having ineptly handled the development of Red Dead Redemption.

Take-Two quickly filed a counterclaim and described Benzies's claims as "entirely without merit and in many instances downright bizarre". The claim asserted that, because Benzies had departed Rockstar North without a good cause, he was not entitled to any additional compensation. The New York Supreme Court partially dismissed Benzies's lawsuit in April 2018 because the profit-sharing agreement did not guarantee equal pay for the Rockstar Principals, although he remained entitled to some royalties. Take-Two later accused Benzies of poaching employees from Rockstar North for his newer studio, Royal Circus Games, and argued that the company's name and trademark had been deliberately chosen to have consumers confuse the two entities. Royal Circus Games was renamed Build a Rocket Boy in October 2018 and, following a confidential settlement, the case was dismissed on 8 February 2019.

For Red Dead Redemption 2, all Rockstar Games studios pooled their resources to act as one team. By the time the game was released in October 2018, Rockstar North had grown to 650 employees. In July 2021, Rockstar North bought Barclay House, where it had become the sole tenant, for £31 million and the adjacent Holyrood Park House, which it had since occupied parts of, for £18.25 million. During 2022, the studio grew to occupy an additional 11,577 square feet (1,075.5 m^{2}) of office space in the latter.

=== Grand Theft Auto VI and union issues (2025–present) ===
Rockstar Games fired 31 studio employees on 30 October 2025, citing public discussion and distribution of confidential information. The Independent Workers' Union of Great Britain (IWGB) accused the company of union busting, stating these employees were attempting to unionise with labour organisers on Discord. Alex Marshall, the president of the IWGB, called the firings "the most blatant and ruthless act of union busting in the history of the games industry". IWGB-organised protests outside the studio started on 6 November and were supported by Ross Greer, the co-leader of the Scottish Greens. Rockstar Games's next release, Grand Theft Auto VI, was delayed on the same day, and a Rockstar North employee said morale was "at rock bottom".

The IWGB issued legal claims against Rockstar Games on 12 November, citing the company's refusal to meet with the union. More than 200 employees signed a petition demanding the workers' reinstatement, and Christine Jardine, the Member of Parliament for Edinburgh West, criticised the firings during a session of the House of Commons. In December, the prime minister, Keir Starmer, called the events "deeply concerning" and said his ministers would investigate. In May 2026, workers of Rockstar North and Rockstar Games's four other UK studios formed the Rockstar Games Workers Union under the IWGB Game Workers Union.

== Games developed ==
=== As DMA Design ===
List of games developed by Rockstar North, 1988–2002
| Year | Title | Platform(s) | Publisher(s) | Notes | Ref. |
|---|---|---|---|---|---|
| 1988 | Menace | Amiga, Atari ST, Commodore 64, MS-DOS | Psygnosis | | |
| 1989 | Ballistix | Commodore 64, MS-DOS, PC Engine | Psygnosis | Port development | |
| 1989 | Blood Money | Amiga, Atari ST, MS-DOS, Commodore 64 | Psygnosis | | |
| 1989 | Shadow of the Beast | Commodore 64, PC Engine | Psygnosis | Port development | |
| 1991 | Lemmings | 3DO, Acorn Archimedes, Amiga, Amiga CD32, Amstrad CPC, Atari Lynx, Atari ST, CD-i, CDTV, Commodore 64, FM Towns, Game Boy, Game Gear, J2ME, Mac OS, Master System, Mega Drive, MS-DOS, Nintendo Entertainment System, PC-98, PC Engine, SAM Coupé, Super Nintendo Entertainment System, X68000, ZX Spectrum | Psygnosis | | |
| 1991 | Oh No! More Lemmings | Acorn Archimedes, Amiga, Atari ST, Mac OS, MS-DOS, SAM Coupé | Psygnosis | | |
| 1993 | Walker | Amiga | Psygnosis | | |
| 1993 | Lemmings 2: The Tribes | Acorn Archimedes, Amiga, Atari ST, FM Towns, Game Boy, Mega Drive, MS-DOS, Super Nintendo Entertainment System | Psygnosis | | |
| 1993 | Hired Guns | Amiga, MS-DOS | Psygnosis | | |
| 1993 | Holiday Lemmings 1993 | Amiga, Mac OS, MS-DOS | Psygnosis | | |
| 1994 | All New World of Lemmings | Amiga, MS-DOS | Psygnosis | | |
| 1994 | Holiday Lemmings 1994 | Amiga, MS-DOS | Psygnosis | | |
| 1994 | Unirally | Super Nintendo Entertainment System | Nintendo | | |
| 1997 | Grand Theft Auto | MS-DOS, PlayStation, Windows | BMG Interactive, ASC Games, Take-Two Interactive | | |
| 1998 | Body Harvest | Nintendo 64 | Gremlin Interactive, Midway Home Entertainment | | |
| 1998 | Space Station Silicon Valley | Nintendo 64, PlayStation | Take-Two Interactive | | |
| 1999 | Tanktics | Windows | Gremlin Interactive, Interplay Entertainment | | |
| 1999 | Wild Metal Country | Dreamcast, Windows | Gremlin Interactive, Rockstar Games | | |
| 1999 | Grand Theft Auto 2 | Dreamcast, PlayStation, Windows | Rockstar Games | | |
| 2001 | Grand Theft Auto III | Android, Fire OS, iOS, macOS, PlayStation 2, Windows, Xbox | Rockstar Games | | |

=== As Rockstar North ===
List of games developed by Rockstar North, 2002–present
| Year | Title | Platform(s) | Publisher(s) | Notes | Ref. |
|---|---|---|---|---|---|
| 2002 | Grand Theft Auto: Vice City | Android, Fire OS, iOS, macOS, PlayStation 2, Windows, Xbox | Rockstar Games | | |
| 2003 | Manhunt | PlayStation 2, Windows, Xbox | Rockstar Games | | |
| 2004 | Grand Theft Auto: San Andreas | Android, Fire OS, iOS, macOS, PlayStation 2, PlayStation 3, Windows, Windows Phone, Xbox, Xbox 360 | Rockstar Games | | |
| 2005 | Grand Theft Auto: Liberty City Stories | Android, Fire OS, iOS, PlayStation 2, PlayStation Portable | Rockstar Games | Co-developed with Rockstar Leeds | |
| 2006 | Grand Theft Auto: Vice City Stories | PlayStation 2, PlayStation Portable | Rockstar Games | Co-developed with Rockstar Leeds | |
| 2007 | Manhunt 2 | PlayStation 2, PlayStation Portable, Wii, Windows | Rockstar Games | Supportive development for Rockstar London | |
| 2008 | Grand Theft Auto IV | PlayStation 3, Windows, Xbox 360 | Rockstar Games | | |
| 2009 | Grand Theft Auto IV: The Lost and Damned | PlayStation 3, Windows, Xbox 360 | Rockstar Games | | |
| 2009 | Grand Theft Auto: Chinatown Wars | Android, Fire OS, iOS, Nintendo DS, PlayStation Portable | Rockstar Games | Co-developed with Rockstar Leeds | |
| 2009 | Grand Theft Auto: The Ballad of Gay Tony | PlayStation 3, Windows, Xbox 360 | Rockstar Games | | |
| 2010 | Red Dead Redemption | Nintendo Switch, PlayStation 3, PlayStation 4, Windows, Xbox 360 | Rockstar Games | Supportive development for Rockstar San Diego | |
| 2011 | L.A. Noire | Nintendo Switch, PlayStation 3, PlayStation 4, Windows, Xbox 360, Xbox One | Rockstar Games | Supportive development for Team Bondi | |
| 2012 | Max Payne 3 | macOS, PlayStation 3, Windows, Xbox 360 | Rockstar Games | Developed as part of Rockstar Studios | |
| 2013 | Grand Theft Auto V | PlayStation 3, PlayStation 4, PlayStation 5, Windows, Xbox 360, Xbox One, Xbox Series X/S | Rockstar Games | | |
| 2018 | Red Dead Redemption 2 | PlayStation 4, Stadia, Windows, Xbox One | Rockstar Games | | |
| 2026 | Grand Theft Auto VI | PlayStation 5, Xbox Series X/S | Rockstar Games | | |

=== Cancelled ===
- Gore!
- Cutiepoo
- Covert
- Zenith
- Kid Kirby
- Attack!
- Clan Wars
- Grand Theft Auto: Online Crime World
- Z
- Agent
