= Deliver At All Costs =

2025 video game

- Developer: Far Out Games
- Publisher: Konami Digital Entertainment
- Director: Daniel Nielsen
- Designers: Daniel Nielsen; Johan Ahlsten; Niklas Lindblad
- Programmer: Jonatan Johansson
- Artist: Jimmy Hultén
- Writers: Jimmy Hultén; Daniel Nielsen; Johan Ahlsten
- Composers: Patrik Jarlestam; Carla Dobbie; Shanshan He; Malin Håkansson
- Engine: Unity
- Platforms: PlayStation 5; Windows; Xbox Series X/S
- Release: 22 May 2025
- Genre: Action-adventure
- Mode: Single-player

Deliver At All Costs is an action-adventure video game developed by Far Out Games and published by Konami Digital Entertainment, featuring completely destructible environments. Announced in September 2024, the game was released for PlayStation 5, Windows and Xbox Series X/S on 22 May 2025. Upon release, it received mixed reviews from critics.

== Gameplay ==
Deliver At All Costs is a single-player action-adventure game. It is played from a third-person perspective with isometric graphics. The game is set across three fictional cities in the United States, which are St. Monique, Shellington Falls and New Reed. While the story is mostly linear and all three towns can only be accessed by progressing through this same story, all three cities are of an open-world scale, including side-quests in the form of characters requesting the player's help or issuing challenges, destructible crates containing money or crafting objects, as well as unique scattered vehicles. Most of the cities' environments are destructible ones, including the interiors of buildings that can be brought down completely, although the player should note that doing this extensively will inevitably draw police attention. The police can be averted by outrunning them and hiding in dumpsters pinged on the minimap, until the pursuit is called off.

Players control the character of Winston Green, who can be controlled both on foot - including jumping over obstacles, using ladders and pushing crates - or by driving most of the vehicles in the game (unlike games like Grand Theft Auto, there is no carjacking involved. Winston is able to start any vehicle he can enter without explanation). Interaction with other characters is possible via conversation, but physical violence is conveyed only through pushing. There are also ways for the player to die, such as driving the vehicle into water, lava, falling from a high altitude, or sustaining significant damage from ordinary collisions, but the player will always regenerate with no limited amount of lives.

Though the player can access many different vehicles (which counts as a side bonus across all the maps), Winston's primary vehicle is the "We Deliver" pickup truck. This is modified throughout the game to perform tasks the jobs demand, or to gain an advantage and make delivery jobs easier. While some modifications are mission related and require no crafting items, such as the winch and an automated crane, others such as the external airbags, wheel spikes and even large ship air horns can be installed for a combat advantage (or wreaking havoc). These require specific crafting items which can either be bought in shops spread across the cities, or collected freely by finding and opening red chests spread across the cities. As an anti-frustration feature it is possible to buy a special item for a high price that reveals the locations of all item chests and money crates.

== Story ==
=== Setting ===
Deliver At All Costs is set in 1959, on three fictional towns across the United States West Coast (presumably between both the states of California and Oregon) - the Caribbean-like isle of St. Monique, the outback town of Shellington Falls and the sprawling metropolis of New Reed. The game's main protagonist is Winston Green, a down on his luck former engineer for the United States Atomic Energy Commission (AEC) who heads off to get a job at the "We Deliver" courier service due to a radio job advertisement which was supposed to have been pulled off the air. The company is headed by the ever-optimistic CEO Harald F. Gurther and his skeptical son Donovan, while being represented by Harald's niece Alison Denver. Other company members include fellow courier Norman Johnson, security officer Gordon Viktus, supervisor Johnny Russel, Human Resources manager Bertha Rover and fellow company workers Hank and Sara. Other important characters include Admiral Armand Sterling, with whom Winston had worked with during his time at the AEC, and Florian Bailey, whom acts as Gurthers' legal advisor.

=== Plot ===
Winston starts his career at the "We Deliver" branch in St. Monique, proving himself to Harald with some successful, although unconventional services (such as delivering crates of fireworks that go live in the city while in transit or going through capers such as selling rotten watermelons posing as legitimately fresh ones). While Winston adapts well to his new life and even forms a friendship with Norman, Donovan grows further and further suspicious of Winston's background, and the company itself turns out to be struggling to the point that Norman's job is at stake. At the same time, Winston himself is haunted by dreams and hallucinations concerning a red fox akin to one Winston failed to kill during his childhood. In spite of attempting to help Donovan in undermining a rival delivery company, Winston finds out that Norman was dismissed from the company. Frustrated, Winston oversleeps within the "We Deliver" building, before being awakened by an earthquake that shakes the St. Monique branch apart. Discovering the isle's volcano Mount Calahan has gone active, Winston drives to his apartment only to find Donovan within it, having discovered that Winston Green is actually Winston Booker, a former AEC scientist whom was involved in a bizarre incident at New Reed University some time ago and is still wanted for his involvement. While Donovan vows to uncover the whole truth, Winston sets out to rescue Norman and evacuate from St. Monique as it is destroyed by the volcano.

One year later, the "We Deliver" staff relocates to Shellington Falls and acquires new staff, but the financial situation has not improved. Winston is still suffering from nightmares and continues to clash with Donovan and the new HR representative Bertha. One night as he returns home, Winston finds an AEC agent searching his trailer. The agent leaves, but Winston is unaware that Gordon is watching. Gordon reports the incident back to Donovan, who makes a deal with the AEC. Donovan will deliver Winston's journal in exchange for participation. Armand arrives at Winston's trailer to inform him of Donovan's involvement and tries leaving with the journal, but Armand is intercepted and killed by Gordon. Donovan presents Winston's journal to Alison to convince her of Winston's duplicity. Winston repeatedly and fruitlessly attempts to meet Harald in an attempt to confess. Winston ultimately arrives to find Harald dead in his office, with a newspaper clipping of a younger Winston in his hands, as well as documents proving Donovan planned to oust Harald from the CEO position. Forced to run away as he'd be considered the prime murder suspect, Winston retreats to his childhood home and digs up what he hid from the AEC, revealed to be an alien energy sphere. Gordon and Donovan track Winston down to the farm and attempt to wrestle the sphere away from him, but the sphere activates and teleports both Winston and Donovan across time to a dystopian future where the AEC has become a dominant superpower. Winston manages to break out from AEC imprisonment and return to the past, but is forced to escape to New Reed. Donovan returns after spending two years in the future, and uses the knowledge and technology he acquired to rebrand "We Deliver" into "Deliver At All Costs".

Two years later, Winston has become a fugitive, gathering information on his experiences, the AEC reports Donovan acquired, and newspaper clippings of the alien artifact. The articles confirm that its capabilities were too powerful for the AEC to handle and it teleported the laboratory where Winston was working on it away. This prompted Armand and Winston to agree that it should be hidden. At the same time, Winston has been conducting a guerilla campaign against "Deliver At All Costs", sabotaging Donovan and Gordon in order to scare off investors and clients. As Winston catches word that his original delivery truck is headed to the scrapyard, he reclaims it but is tailed by Gordon who chases him but dies when a railroad bridge falls on his truck. In a final defiant act, Winston refits the delivery truck with armor plating and uses it to smash through the DAAC headquarters up to Donovan's office, where Winston confronts Donovan. Winston confirms that Donovan is also suffering from hallucinations and nightmares similar to the ones Winston has been experiencing, and that Donovan had sent Gordon to get the journal from Armand, but that he didn't order Gordan to kill Armand. Winston reclaims the alien sphere and orders Donovan into the pickup truck. Winston then drives the truck out of the office window as the alien sphere activates again, teleporting both away as the truck crashes into the street below.

In the post-credits scene, the tribunal court where Winston's case is being judged (in spite of the absence of either Winston or Donovan) is disrupted by pro-Winston protesters, one of them carrying a sign stating "Winston will come back".

== Development ==
Deliver At All Costs is the first game that Far Out Games developed, and was in development for four years. The studio is based in Gothenburg, Sweden.

== Release ==
A demo for the Deliver At All Costs was made available at the 2025 Steam Next Fest. On the game's first week of release, it was made free on the Epic Games Store.

== Reception ==
Reception

Aggregate scores
Aggregator	Score
Metacritic	(PC) 65/100 (PS5) 69/100
OpenCritic	(Top Critic Average) 71/100 (Critics Recommend) 50% recommend (Note: Based on 69 reviews)

Review scores
Publication	Score
Computer Games Magazine	(PS5) 8.5/10
GameSpot	(PC) 5/10
HobbyConsolas	(PS5) 82/100
IGN	(PS5) 6/10
PC Games (DE)	(PS5) 7/10
The Games Machine (Italy)	(PC) 7.8/10
The Guardian	(PS5) 2/5

Deliver At All Costs received "mixed or average" reviews from critics, according to review aggregator website Metacritic.
