= Uniracers =

1994 video game

- North American box art by David Harto
- Developer: DMA Design
- Publisher: Nintendo
- Designers: Mike Dailly; Robbie Graham
- Programmer: Andrew Innes
- Artist: Martin Good
- Writer: Steve Hammond
- Composer: Colin Anderson
- Platform: Super Nintendo Entertainment System
- Release: NA: 5 December 1994; EU: 27 April 1995
- Genre: Racing
- Modes: Single-player, multiplayer

Uniracers (released as Unirally in Europe) is a racing game developed by DMA Design and published by Nintendo for the Super Nintendo Entertainment System in North America in December 1994 and in the PAL territories on 27 April 1995. DMA Design and Nintendo stopped cartridge production of the game, and the game has not been rereleased since. It is frequently reported that the reason for this is due to a lawsuit from Pixar over copyright infringement.

== Gameplay ==
Gameplay screenshot.

The gameplay of Uniracers involves racing riderless unicycles around a 2D track. Heavy emphasis is placed on performing stunts, which cause the unicycle to accelerate on race or circuit tracks and earn points on stunt tracks. The stunts that can be performed are relatively simple, primarily involving jumping into the air and rotating around a given axis in 3D space. The objective is to perform these stunts quickly in tight situations while landing the unicycle on its wheels to avoid wiping out, which results in the loss of accumulated speed.

The game features nine tours of five tracks each (two race, two circuit, one stunt), totalling 45 tracks. Completing each of the first eight tours requires defeating computer-controlled opponents for each of the bronze, silver, and gold ranks. The final circuit features the Anti-Uni as the computer-controlled opponent. During this tour, colliding with the Anti-Uni causes several unusual effects, such as rendering the track invisible, reversing controls, and desynchronising the backgrounds from the actions.

The track is composed of bars with patterns that correspond to the properties of the track at or near that point. For example, a solid yellow bar indicates a shortcut, while orange/yellow bars signify an upcoming hazard. There are also various obstacles, including speed boosts, corkscrews, loops, twists, and jumps. Split-screen two-player modes are available as well, including a league mode that allows up to eight players to compete in one-on-one races. There are 16 different coloured unicycles to choose from, each with its own save file and customisable name.

== Development and release ==
Uniracers was known by the working title "1x1" during its development. The developers practised riding real unicycles throughout their offices to enhance their understanding of the mechanics. The game was released as Uniracers in North America on 5 December 1994 and as Unirally in Europe on 27 April 1995.

=== Lawsuit claim ===
According to Mike Dailly, shortly after the game's release, DMA Design was sued by Pixar for allegedly copying the unicycle design and concept from their 1987 short film Red's Dream. He commented, "The problem with Pixar was that they seemed to think that any computer generated unicycle was owned by them". DMA Design lost the lawsuit, and as a result, Nintendo had to terminate production of additional Uniracers cartridges. According to Dailly, "The deal was that Nintendo wouldn't make any more carts, so Unirally only sold the 300k initial run". Fellow DMA Design developer Robbie Graham recalled, "They took footage from Red's Dream and compared it to Unirally and the unicycles were virtually the same; this isn't a big surprise as there's not a lot of ways you can bring life to a unicycle without looking like the one Pixar did. The judge—being the moron that he was—agreed".

The limited sales were one of the factors that led to DMA Design being sold to British video game company Gremlin Interactive, and then quickly again to American publisher Take-Two Interactive, to become a subsidiary of Rockstar Games.

Court records show that Pixar actually sued Nintendo of America, not DMA Design, and that the case was settled out of court five months later.

== Reception ==
Reception

Aggregate score
Aggregator	Score
GameRankings	79%

Review scores
Publication	Score
AllGame	4/5
Computer and Video Games	87/100
Electronic Gaming Monthly	7/10, 5/10, 5/10, 5/10
EP Daily	9/10
Game Informer	8.5/10, 9.25/10
GamesMaster	89%
Hyper	86/100
Next Generation	3/5
Nintendo Power	3.425/5
Official Nintendo Magazine	92/100
Super Play	85%
Total!	(UK) 90/100 (DE) 2+
Electronic Games	A
Entertainment Weekly	B−
Games World	93/100
Super Gamer	79/100
Ultimate Future Games	75%
VideoGames	8/10

Uniracers received generally favorable reception from critics, holding a rating of 79% based on five reviews according to review aggregator GameRankings. GamePro's Lawrence Neves praised the game's fast pacing and "hard-drivin' unicycle music", but criticised the sound effects and graphics, noting that the backgrounds are clean but boring and the unicycles "all look identical". Nintendo Power found the game fast-paced and fun, commending its visuals but noted the lack of variation with the racers and tracks. Next Generation stated that the game was innovative and oddly compelling despite its superficial dullness, but noted that the excitement and novelty diminished quickly. Electronic Gaming Monthly's four editors stated that while the graphics and controls were good, the game lacked charm and excitement.

=== Accolades ===
Nintendo Power ranked it as the 8th best SNES game of 1994. In 2011, IGN named it the 98th best game for the system. In 2018, Complex rated the game the 52nd best Super Nintendo game, stating: "Loops, flips, tricks, Uniracers had it all. It was a bona fide SNES game, with the colors, fun, and music that made the system great. We love this game." In 1995, Total! placed the game 23rd on its Top 100 SNES Games, writing: "It's bizarre, but it works and unusually it's superb in both one player and two player modes". In 1996, Super Play awarded Unirally 97th place in their Top 100 SNES Games of All Time. They praised the game’s original gameplay and graphics, writing: "The enjoyment of hammering around loops and twirls is heightened by the split-screen two-player mode, which makes all the difference".

== See also ==
- Intellectual property protection of video games
