= Body Harvest =

1998 video game

- North American cover art
- Developer: DMA Design
- Publishers: NA: Midway Games; EU: Gremlin Interactive
- Directors: John Whyte; Gary Penn
- Artist: Stacey Jamieson
- Composers: Stuart Ross; Allan Walker
- Platform: Nintendo 64
- Release: NA: October 20, 1998; EU: November 13, 1998
- Genres: Action-adventure, third-person shooter
- Mode: Single-player

Body Harvest is a 1998 action-adventure video game developed by DMA Design and published by Gremlin Interactive for the Nintendo 64. It was intended to be a launch title for the system, but was delayed due to its original publisher, Nintendo, having issues with the game's violent themes; they eventually dropped the game, leaving DMA to find a new publisher. Gremlin would later acquire the rights to the game and released it in Europe, while Midway Games released it in North America.

In Body Harvest, players assume the role of a genetically engineered soldier, Adam Drake, who must investigate and eliminate an alien attack force that has been returning once every 25 years to "harvest" the human population of Earth for their organic material. Being in possession of a time travel device, Drake must return to the past and battle in five areas over a 100-year period that covers World War I–era Greece, World War II–era Indonesia in the 1940s, the United States in the 1960s, Russia in the 1990s, and the near future (2016). The game is non-linear, as players can go anywhere and do anything within the limits of the game's boundaries.

The game would be re-released as part of a game compilation for the Polymega system in 2025, which also includes Burning Road, Dead in the Water and S.C.A.R.S. (the latter also includes the PlayStation version). As with other Gremlin Interactive titles, Body Harvest was licensed by Piko Interactive.

== Plot ==
The opening text tells of how an alien force has harvested the population of Earth over a 100-year time period. Every 25 years, they land and imprison whole areas in shields that prevented anyone from leaving and any outside help getting in. The aliens harvest the population of the area within a time limit of one day before moving on to another area. After repeating this several times, they teleport back to their homeworld, an artificially created comet, before returning exactly 25 years later as it has completed its orbit around the nearby star systems back to earth. Greece was the first targeted area in 1916, southern Spain was second, eastern Canada was third, and the south island of Japan was fourth. In 1941, the first targeted area was the Indonesian island Java. In 1966, it was the United States. Finally, in 1991, the Siberia region of Russia was targeted. The player only has to stop the aliens in the first area that they target in order to save every future targeted area of that time period.

The opening cutscene shows Station Omega, an orbital space station containing Earth's last survivors. The year is 2016 and the aliens have returned to destroy the last remnant of the human race. The aliens attack and board Station Omega, chasing Adam Drake, the game's playable character, through the corridors. Even though Adam defeats the initial invaders he is wounded in the process. He is ready to board Alpha I, the time traveling vehicle developed at Station Omega, when more aliens appear and try to force their way into the boarding chamber. The monitors show his colleague, Daisy Hernandez, telling Adam to get into the Alpha I without letting the aliens gain access to it. As the aliens force the door open, Adam dives through the air lock and fires a single shot into the control panel; this closes the door and prevents the aliens from pursuing him further. As they escape the station in the Alpha I, they are pursued by Alien fighter craft, but open up a time portal and escape. Meanwhile, back on Station Omega, an Alien is shown holding a drop of Adam's blood and eyes it strangely. This is a subtle hint as to where Adam's nemesis, Tomegatherion, is cloned from.

== Gameplay ==
Protagonist Adam Drake in the Siberia level

Each level in Body Harvest requires the player to stop the aliens from slaughtering everyone in the shield area. The player will navigate the map, often coming across towns where aliens will teleport in to attack the town and harvest civilians. Aliens warp in frequently to attack the player and can appear from the land, air or sea. Generally, gameplay consists of completing a series of missions. Once the player completes a mission they are prompted to check the map to find out what the next mission is. The game is set in an open world environment.

There is a meter at the bottom of the screen that represents civilian casualties. If too many civilians die for any reason (including friendly-fire), the aliens will destroy the area and the mission will have failed. Generally, only Harvester aliens deliberately kill civilians, but the player must be careful not to shoot or run down any civilians in the process of rescuing them. The player must react to Harvester Waves quickly, as if the aliens manage to harvest 8 humans in a single wave they will create an extremely dangerous 'Mutant' creature, which immediately attacks the player regardless of location. There are also several optional missions that require saving people from the aliens, and although one can fail these missions and still progress through the game, doing so will result in significant human casualties.

The use of vehicles is a key aspect of this game. Vehicles provide significant protection from alien attacks and allow the player to travel at a far greater speed than on foot. Adam can still fire most weapons from within a vehicle, although many vehicles are equipped with powerful weapons of their own. Vehicles take damage independently of Adam and can be repaired with health pickups spawned by defeating larger aliens. Specific vehicles are often required to advance - for example, boats allow travel over bodies of water, while planes and helicopters allow travel through the air. Each vehicle has a unique combination of top speed, armor and fuel capacity, inviting players to consider their options carefully. Vehicles range from mundane civilian forms of transport to powerful military hardware - the player will pilot tanks, armored cars and aircraft as frequently as cars, trucks and motorcycles. In addition, the Alpha I (the ship the player uses to travel through time) becomes a powerful armored hovercraft during boss battles and for the entirety of the Comet level.

There are many buildings in each stage which can be entered on foot, many of which are essential to talk to plot characters and acquire necessary items. Buildings also contain health pickups, new weapons other than the standard pistol are a machine gun, shotgun, rifle and rocket launcher that each use different types of ammunition. The buildings also have Ammunition pickups and fuel cans (of which one will refuel a vehicle once). With thorough exploration, rarer items can be found including alien artifacts and 'weapon crystals', three of which combine to form a technologically advanced powerful laser weapon unique to that level.

The eventual goal of each level is to destroy the Shield Generator to remove the shield that surrounds the region. To do this, the player must first destroy a number of Alien Processors, which act as sub-bosses. Defeating an Alien Processor opens a gateway to the next area and allows the player to save their progress. Once the Shield Generator itself has been destroyed, the player immediately faces that level's boss. Once the boss is defeated, the player travels forward in time and to the next level.

== Development ==
Body Harvest was one of 13 games demoed at the Nintendo 64's unveiling at the 1995 Shoshinkai show, though it was not in playable form and was described by journalists as one of the most incomplete of the 13 games.

The development team were very enthusiastic about the Nintendo 64 as a development platform. Project leader John Whyte commented: "It's been really well designed and we haven't even scratched the surface. It's scary. The drawing chip is a masterpiece of engineering. There are no hassles for developers compared to other systems. You don't have to worry about clipping. It just handles it."

In contrast to DMA Design's previous publisher, Psygnosis, who showed minimal interest in the development of their games, Nintendo frequently directed the development team to make major changes to Body Harvest's gameplay and visual style. The language barrier between the Japanese publisher and British developer added to the difficulty of implementing these changes, as the developers sometimes struggled to understand what Nintendo wanted from them; Whyte cited as an example a message in which Nintendo told them to make the graphics "more materialistic". DMA Design's head, David Jones, described their relationship with Nintendo:

It's fine. It's hard. It's a very hard relationship because their quality is so high, that it's so hard to match the quality of the products they do. And they really want you to focus on making Nintendo products. It's very hard to write games that you're not writing for yourself, which is traditionally what I've done. ... And basically, we just have to listen to them because we're not as good as they are. Nobody in the world is as good as they are, so we'd be daft to try and say, "We think you're wrong." So we just have to work with them, and we implement everything that they ask for.

== Reception ==
Reception

Aggregate score
Aggregator	Score
Metacritic	73/100

Review scores
Publication	Score
AllGame	3/5
Edge	8/10
Electronic Gaming Monthly	8.25/10
Game Informer	7.75/10
GameRevolution	D+
GameSpot	7/10
IGN	8.4/10
N64 Magazine	91%
Next Generation	4/5
Nintendo Power	8.1/10

The game received "average" reviews according to the review aggregation website Metacritic.

Next Generation reviewed the game and gave four stars out of five, commenting that Body Harvest is not as clever or polished as DMA's own Space Station: Silicon Valley, but is an unsettling and enjoyable game with lots of original and fun features.
