= Wild Metal Country =

1999 video game

- Microsoft Windows cover art
- Developer: DMA Design
- Publishers: Microsoft Windows; Gremlin Interactive; Dreamcast; Rockstar Games
- Producer: Chris Stamp
- Designer: Jeff Cairns
- Programmer: Patrick Kerr
- Artist: Jeff Cairns
- Composer: Craig Conner
- Platforms: Microsoft Windows; Dreamcast
- Release: Microsoft Windows; EU: 15 May 1999; WW: 6 January 2004 (digital); Dreamcast; NA: 1 February 2000; UK: 25 February 2000
- Genre: Action
- Modes: Single-player, multiplayer

Wild Metal Country is an action video game developed by DMA Design. The game was published by Gremlin Interactive and released for Microsoft Windows in May 1999. A Dreamcast port, known as Wild Metal, was released in February 2000 by Rockstar Games, which later also re-released the Windows version.

== Gameplay ==
Two tanks engaged in combat

Wild Metal Country is an action game designed for single-player or multiplayer play, where the player can choose different types of tanks and fight with other tanks on different planets.

== Plot ==
The game takes place in three planets of a Theric system where machines have gone out of control. They drove out the human population and took over the planets. The humans have finally regained the strength to recover their planets. In single player, the mission is to destroy the enemy, and, more importantly, recover the stolen power cores. In multiplayer mode, all the power cores in one of the other planets have been recovered. The team of bounty hunters that recovered them are now fighting among themselves for the loot and the credit.

== Release ==
Wild Metal Country was released for Microsoft Windows by Gremlin Interactive in Europe on 15 May 1999. In co-operation with Matrox, subsequent releases of the game added bump mapping to enhance the game's graphical fidelity. A Dreamcast port, under the name Wild Metal, was released by Rockstar Games in North America on 1 February 2000 and in the United Kingdom on 25 February. In January 2004, the Windows version of the game, enhanced with compatibility for modern hardware, was re-released as part of Rockstar Games' "Rockstar Classics" series of freeware games, which had already included 1997's Grand Theft Auto and was available on the company's website. Alongside Rockstar Games' entire catalogue of Windows games, Wild Metal Country was also released on digital distribution platform Steam in January 2008.

== Reception ==
Reception

Aggregate score
Aggregator	Score	
Aggregator	Dreamcast	PC
GameRankings	52%	68%

Review scores
Publication	Score	
Publication	Dreamcast	PC
AllGame	1.5/5	4/5
CNET Gamecenter	3/10	N/A
Edge	N/A	7/10
Electronic Gaming Monthly	5.375/10	N/A
Game Informer	3/10	N/A
GameFan	71%	N/A
GamePro	1.5/5	N/A
GameSpot	3.7/10	N/A
GameSpy	1.5/10	N/A
IGN	8.3/10	N/A
Jeuxvideo.com	6/20	11/20
Next Generation	3/5	N/A
PC Gamer (UK)	N/A	67%

Wild Metal Country and Wild Metal both received mixed reviews. Writing for games website GameSpot, Ben Stahl concluded his review of the Dreamcast version, saying that the game had potential, but felt to be boring and frustrating. Greg Orlando of NextGen reviewed the same console version, giving it three stars out of five, having a positive remark about its gameplay.
