= Tides of War (video game) =

1998 video game

- Developer: Devil's Thumb Entertainment
- Publisher: GT Interactive
- Platform: Windows
- Release: September 1998

Tides of War is a naval real-time strategy game developed by Devil's Thumb Entertainment and published by GT Interactive. It was released in September 1998 for Windows.

== Gameplay ==
Tides of War is a mission-based naval combat and exploration game in which players start as low-ranking officers on modest ships and can upgrade to larger ships as they complete missions and accumulate wealth. Players the weapons, crew morale, food, and upgrades of their ship. Real-time combat against other ships uses a top-down view, and players can use tactics like sinking ships, tearing down sails, or boarding and robbing ships. Missions can involve combat, pursuit, escort, delivery, search and destroy, or exploration. Players can choose sides like English, Spanish, or Pirates. Players have total freedom to explore and discover the vast and non-linear world. The game includes 8-player TCP/IP or LAN gaming, computer animated cut-scenes, and multiple camera angles.

== Development ==
The game was developed by Devil's Thumb Entertainment, a company founded in November 1996 in Boulder, Colorado.

== Reception ==
Reception

Review scores
| Publication | Score |
|---|---|
| All Game Guide | 3/5 |
| Hacker | 80% |
| PC Joker | 58% |

Games Domain said "Tides of War is an excellent game that is toppled by design implementation that comes at odds with its best intentions, ultimately reducing it to a (noticeable) step above mediocrity".
