= Agent (video game) =

Cancelled video game

- Promotional artwork
- Developer: Rockstar North
- Publisher: Rockstar Games
- Platform: PlayStation 3
- Release: Cancelled
- Genres: Stealth, action
- Mode: Single-player

Agent is a cancelled stealth action game developed by Rockstar North for PlayStation 3. The game was to be set in the 1970s Cold War era. Agent was teased in July 2007 and formally announced in June 2009. The trademark for the game's title was renewed in 2013 and 2017, and abandoned by November 2018.

== Setting ==
Agent was to be set during the Cold War in the late 1970s. According to a press release, the game was planned to "take players into the world of counter-intelligence, espionage and political assassinations".

== Development ==
In July 2007, during E3 of that year, Sony Computer Entertainment announced that Rockstar Games was working on a new franchise for the PlayStation 3. Michael Shorrock, Sony Computer Entertainment America's director of third-party relations, wrote on the official U.S. PlayStation Blog: "As part of our long standing relationship with Rockstar, and the incredible success for both companies with the cultural icon that is Grand Theft Auto we've agreed to the PlayStation exclusive rights of the next great franchise from the Rockstar studios." Nothing more was revealed about the new franchise except the clarification that it would not be L.A. Noire. According to Shorrock, "Rockstar really wanted to make a game that you can truly only do on PS3" and added that the reason Sony locked the intellectual property down as an exclusive deal was because Sony believed the franchise would "set the bar for the rest of the industry". Ben Feder, the then-president of Take-Two Interactive (Rockstar's parent company), said that the game would be "genre-defining" and "a whole new way of experiencing videogames that we haven't really seen before".

Details of the project, including its title, were not announced until June 2009, when an announcement was made during the Sony press conference at the E3 2009. Sam Houser, one of the founders of Rockstar Games, described Agent as a game the company wanted to make for some time, and that they had set out to create a unique experience for the player. Feder professed his belief that the game could achieve the same level of success as the Grand Theft Auto series and become "yet another great Rockstar North franchise title", given that its development was being overseen by Rockstar Games co-founders Sam and Dan Houser. Speaking with GameSpot on the E3 2009 show floor, Feder explained the decision to develop the game solely for Sony's console as stemming from the increased support from Sony as an exclusive title rather than developing the game across platforms.

On 7 September 2009, in a Question and Answer section on their blog, Rockstar Games stated that Agent could be released as early as 2010, though Take-Two Interactive did not comment on the subject until March 2010, when it confirmed that Agent was still in development. On 9 June 2010, Take-Two Interactive confirmed that Agent was still planned as a PS3-exclusive title. On 24 May 2011, after nearly two years since Agent was announced at E3 2009, Take-Two Interactive confirmed the title was still in active development, even though it had never been seen by the public up to that time. However, Sony Computer Entertainment America's chief executive officer (CEO), Jack Tretton, said at E3 2011 that he was unsure over Agent's PlayStation 3 exclusivity and that it was a decision for Rockstar Games to make.

On 15 August 2011, Leigh Donoghue, a former Rockstar North environmental artist, who had worked on Grand Theft Auto IV and Agent, posted the first images of Agent to his online resume. The shots show a character as well as various indoor environments from the game. Both of the images mention that they were made in 2009. On 1 August 2012, when asked about Agent at Take-Two Interactive's financial report for the first quarter of 2013, chairman and CEO Strauss Zelnick said "we haven't announced anything about that title".

With the announcement of the PlayStation 4 on 20 February 2013, there was an expectation that Agent may have moved to become a PlayStation 4-exclusive title. However, there was no mention of the game at the launch, while developer Rockstar North had signed up to support the PlayStation 4. When asked whether Agent was still a PlayStation 3 title during a roundtable media session that followed the press conference for the PlayStation 4's reveal, Sony Worldwide Studios boss Shuhei Yoshida said: "You are asking the wrong person. I have some knowledge, but I'm not in a position to talk about it."

In July 2013, Take-Two Interactive renewed its trademarks for the "Agent" name. In December 2015, a few new screenshots from between 2009 and 2010 were leaked by former Rockstar North artist Darren Charles Hatton on his online portfolio. The artist said that the art team was taken off the Agent project and reassigned to Grand Theft Auto V, adding that he was "not sure if this project will ever be published". On 5 December 2016, Take-Two Interactive again renewed the "Agent" trademark. On 27 August 2017, images of concept art were allegedly leaked online, including depictions of a snowy alpine setting and apparent character sketches. On 19 November 2018, the United States Patent and Trademark Office declared the "Agent" trademark as abandoned. As of October 2021, the official website for Agent redirects to Rockstar Games's official website and the game is no longer listed on Rockstar's games page.

According to Obbe Vermeij, former technical director at Rockstar North, the studio was initially split between developing Grand Theft Auto and Agent, and the pressure to complete Grand Theft Auto V led Agent's team to be reassigned. In an October 2025 interview with Lex Fridman, Dan Houser said he believed that game's film-like story could not work in Rockstar's open-world format. In October 2026, Houser stated that Rockstar attempted to develop the project with several different teams trying various concepts, but "couldn't get it quite right", concluding that "it was not a game we were ever going to figure out how to make".
