= Hired Guns =

1993 video game

- Developer: DMA Design
- Publisher: Psygnosis
- Producer: Graham Stafford
- Designer: Scott Johnston
- Artists: Graeme Anderson; David Osborne; Geoff Cunning
- Composer: Brian Johnston
- Platforms: Amiga, MS-DOS
- Release: April 1993
- Genre: Role-playing
- Modes: Single-player, multiplayer

Hired Guns is a 1993 role-playing video game developed by DMA Design and published by Psygnosis for Amiga and MS-DOS. In the year 2712, players control a team of four outlaw mercenaries, chosen from a pool of twelve, attempting to destroy illegal bio-engineered organisms using a thermonuclear explosion. The game shows four simultaneous first-person perspective viewpoints and allows up to four players to play together. Players must manage their characters' inventory and carrying capacity, and adapt to various environmental challenges like underwater areas.

The game's release was delayed multiple times, leading to a running gag in British magazine Amiga Power. Upon release, Hired Guns received praise for its multiplayer mode, offering moments of surprise and satisfaction, but it faced criticism for its documentation, copy protection, and clumsy inventory management. In 1996, GamesMaster ranked Hired Guns 62nd on their "Top 100 Games of All Time".

== Gameplay ==
The game uses a system of four simultaneous Dungeon Master-style first-person perspective viewpoints in the world. Each character is individually controllable and occupies their own square, unlike Dungeon Master, in which the entire party occupies the same square. Each character can be made to follow another character, simplifying large group movements when only one player is controlling the party. The gameplay was advanced for its time, allowing up to four players to play simultaneously, using mouse, keyboard or (modified) Sega Mega Drive joypad, with a parallel port adaptor allowing four joypads/joysticks to be used at once.

The game area is in real 3D, and monster/enemy AI have free movement around each level environment. This is unlike other games of its time, in which enemies cannot pursue characters up stairs. An array of light and heavy weapons (including robot sentries), incendiary devices, mines and grenades can be used to take out the enemy (or friends) either on the same level as the player or below.

Players have to manage their inventory, too, as the combined weight of the items in a character's inventory is limited by their carrying capacity. If this limit is exceeded the message "Too heavy!" will be displayed on the character's viewpoint and they may not add anything more to the inventory until enough items have been discarded or consumed to bring the total weight below their carrying capacity again. There are no other penalties on movement or actions for carrying too heavy a load.

Different characters have different carrying capacities. E.g. a heavy combat droid can lug around more weight than a human female.

Also included are devices called "Psionic Amps" that can be used to create strange effects on the player or on the world around them — e.g. one type of Psionic Amp can be used underwater to create an area of air so human characters can breathe.

Underwater areas affect gameplay in two major ways: human characters will drown if they stay under for too long while weapons and equipment will take damage at varying rates until they are destroyed outright. Energy weapons are particularly susceptible to water damage and most types will be destroyed in mere seconds unless protected by a suitable psionic amp which must be activated before entering the water. Neither robotic nor human characters can swim, but are relegated to walking around on the bottom in the same manner as on land.

== Plot ==
A team of outlaw mercenaries, led by the character Rorian are hired to destroy all of the illegally bio-engineered organisms on the planet Graveyard via means of a fusion induced thermonuclear explosion, which is to be achieved by collecting four fusion power core rings, and depositing them in the corresponding field coil generator located at Graveyard Central Spaceport. The secondary mission objective is to reconnoitre ground installations.

== Release ==
British magazine Amiga Power (AP) had a long running gag about Hired Guns. It printed a thin strip on the back cover with a few lines about next month's issue and a screenshot of an upcoming game. As the Hired Guns release was delayed, Amiga Power repeatedly used the same screenshot, with repeated reassurances that they might, possibly, have it by next month. When the game finally arrived, it remained in the Next Month strip along with text suggesting it was stuck there and nobody knew how to remove it.

== Reception ==
Computer Gaming World in 1994 praised Hired Guns's multiplayer mode when playing the campaign or minigames, noting the "fantastic moments of surprise" from friendly fire or nearby allies unintentionally preventing a wounded player from escaping. The magazine criticized the "thorough, but flawed" documentation and "extremely intrusive copy protection", inability for keyboard players to strafe, and clumsy inventory management, but concluded that "Hired Guns is viscerally satisfying". In 1996, GamesMaster ranked Hired Guns 62nd on their "Top 100 Games of All Time".
