= Menace (video game) =

1988 video game

- Cover art by Ian Craig
- Developer: DMA Design
- Publisher: Psygnosis
- Designer: David Jones
- Programmer: David Jones
- Artist: Tony Smith
- Composer: David Whittaker
- Platforms: Amiga, Atari ST, Commodore 64, MS-DOS
- Release: Amiga; October 1988; Atari ST; December 1988; Commodore 64; January 1989; MS-DOS; December 1989
- Genre: Scrolling shooter
- Mode: Single-player

Menace is a horizontally scrolling shooter developed by DMA Design and published by Psygnosis. It was released for the Amiga and Atari ST in 1988, and for the Commodore 64 and MS-DOS in 1989. The game is set on the planet of Draconia, where players are tasked with destroying the planet's defence mechanisms in order to kill the harmful creatures.

The game was designed by David Jones, and was the first game developed by his company DMA Design. First developed in his bedroom at his parents' house, Jones began seeking an official development studio and publisher when the game was nearing completion. He eventually settled upon a publishing deal with Psygnosis, who first published the game in 1988 to positive reviews; praise was given to the game's graphics, sound and gameplay, while criticism was directed at its ports to inferior hardware. The game sold over 20,000 copies.

== Gameplay ==
The player uses a space fighter to attack enemies.

The player controls an alien space fighter, moving through six stages on the planet of Draconia to advance through the game. Players use the ship's weaponry—lasers and cannons—to attack all advancing enemies, and defeat the level's boss: a guardian of Draconia. The six bosses act as Draconia's living defence mechanisms—the planet was created to habituate gruesome and harmful creatures, of which there are over sixty, participating in unlawful tasks. In the game's levels, players discover space debris, which can be converted into upgrades for the ship. The debris appears as tokens, and grants players additional weapons and upgrades, such as lasers, cannons, and improved ship and weapon power. The ship also has a shield, which provides temporary protection from enemies; contact with enemies and walls depletes the shields, increasing players' vulnerability to death.

== Development ==
David Jones, based in Dundee, Scotland, began developing Menace under the working title CopperCon1 in his bedroom at his parents' house while attending the Dundee Institute of Technology at the time. Jones approached Hewson Consultants to publish the game in 1988; after playing, Andrew Braybrook recommended it to Hewson. When Jones was informed Hewson wanted the game to be the "Amiga version of Zynaps ", he realised sales would be limited and refused to sign the contract. Hewson had already promoted the game in Popular Computing Weekly before the deal was dropped. After signing a publishing deal with Psygnosis, Jones formed DMA Design.

Tony Smith worked on some of the game's backgrounds and graphics, while Jones designed the levels. Jones made Menace a side-scrolling game after playing arcade games such as Nemesis (1985) and R-Type (1987). Smith often re-designed the player ship as Psygnosis could not decide a preference. The development team faced difficulty porting the game to the Atari ST, due to the hardware's limitations with smooth scrolling. Brian "Biscuit" Watson, who the team met at a computer club in 1984, discovered a technique to overcome this difficulty. Other limitations included the fewer colours available with the hardware, for which Smith adapted his designs. After completing his own game, Kay was assigned to port Menace to PC.

During development, the sound effects temporarily consisted of noises by Jones, before being replaced with sounds from Salamander (1986), which Jones recorded as Hammond and Dailly played. The final sound effects were designed by musician David Whittaker. Menace's cover art was designed by Ian Craig. The game was known as Draconia until shortly before release, as it was considered too similar to Draconus. Psygnosis began distributing Menace in late September 1988; it was released for the Amiga in October 1988, the Atari ST in December 1988, the Commodore 64 in January 1989, and MS-DOS in December 1989.

== Reception ==
Reception

Review scores
Publication	Score
Computer and Video Games	(ST) 73%
ACE	(AMI) 678/1000 (PC) 625/1000
The Games Machine	(AMI) 78% (PC) 78% (ST) 75%
ST/Amiga Format	(AMI) 90%
Zzap!64	(C64) 49%

The game received mostly positive reviews from critics upon release, particularly for its gameplay, graphical design, and sound. Criticism was also directed at the game's ports, and the limitations met with the inferior hardware. Jason Holborn of ST/Amiga Format wrote that the game "provides some of the best arcade action" in an Amiga game. The game generated a considerable amount of money for DMA Design, allowing the company to develop more games. The game sold 20,000 copies, reportedly generating around £20,000.

Holborn of ST/Amiga Format called the gameplay "exceptional" and "addictive", stating that players will be "hooked for hours on end". Ciaran Brennan of Computer and Video Games praised its replayability, writing that it has "enough depth built in to make it last". Conversely, Zzap!64's Kati Hamza wrote that the gameplay is "rather poor", disliking the pace and level design, and Maff Evans in the same review called it "dull and unrewarding", pointing out the lack of excitement and reward. The Games Machine condemned the "jerky scrolling" of the PC version, while Rod Lawton of ACE called the gameplay of the Amiga version "stubbornly 8-bit".

The game's graphics received positive reactions. Lawton of ACE called them "attractive", and Holborn of ST/Amiga Format named them "beautifully stomach churning", calling Menace "one of the best presented games available". While Zzap!64's Hamza felt that the Amiga version was "blessed with nice graphics", she wrote that the Commodore 64 version has "surprisingly weak presentation"; Evans similarly called the graphics "half-baked". The Games Machine was disappointed by the graphics, particularly identifying the limited colour capabilities of the Atari ST version.

Reviewers praised the game's use of sound. ST/Amiga Format's Holborn lauded the soundtrack's appropriation to gameplay, calling it "brilliant", and writing that the game's speech and sound effects enhance the feel of the game. The Games Machine favourably compared the soundtrack to Xenon (1988), but noted that the sounds in the Atari ST version are "less clear", and the PC sound effects are "pathetic". Zzap!64 called the soundtrack "average", and wrote that the "pathetic [sound] effects add little atmosphere".
