= Tanktics (1999 video game) =

1999 video game

- Developer: DMA Design
- Publisher: Interplay Entertainment
- Producer: Brian Lawson
- Programmer: Tommy Kane
- Artist: Kenneth Fee
- Composers: Craig Conner; Stuart Ross
- Platform: Windows
- Release: NA: 8 October 1999
- Genre: Strategy
- Mode: Single-player

Tanktics is a strategy video game developed by DMA Design for Microsoft Windows. It was published by Interplay in 1999.

The objective of the game is to progress through four eras. The player must build and control tanks in preceding eras to fight the "evil black tanks" from a more advanced era. Tanks are built by hand out of parts, which are randomly constructed by a factory (the "Part-o-Matic") in the player's base when it is provided with resources. Different parts may offer the ability to cross various terrain, offensive capabilities more suitable to current tactics, and so forth. The player's primary control is "the crane", a flying magnet (held by, for example, a pterodactyl in the first ancient era) which can pick up and drop single parts. A suitable pile of parts becomes a tank, which can be selected and ordered to move by the magnet.

The game also has a strong puzzle element. The magnet can pick up boulders (e.g. for blocking off enemy routes) and sheep (which can be used to increase the factory's production rate, amongst other things), and there are various terrain types with lasting effects. For example, driving a tank through mud will make it dirty, causing it to move more slowly until it is washed. Some maps have buttons on them which can only be activated by tanks with sufficient combat experience. Disassembling a tank will make it lose all of its experience.

The game is very micromanagement heavy, requiring the player to spread their attention thinly over maintaining the continually tiring sheep at the factory, tank battles, negotiation of terrain hazards such as quicksand, and tank construction.

== Gameplay ==
=== Basics ===
There are four worlds in campaign mode: Stone Age, Medieval, Modern, and Futuristic, each containing six levels. The enemy is always one world in technology above the player's team, the final one being the "Evil Black Tanks" themselves. There is also a challenge and training mode. The challenge mode consists of tasks such as destroying certain tanks with boulders, crushing black sheep to defending the base, and reassembling tanks.

The Part-O-Matic is the only structure controlled by the player. It produces a set of parts, determined by the level. The speed is determined by the number of sheep on its wheel. Sheep are found randomly grazing and can be picked up by the player's crane and dropped on the Part-O-Matic's wheel. After an allotted amount of time, sheep will grow tired and need to be restored in the sheep dip found throughout the level. Once they have rested, they may be put back on the wheel. Black sheep spread their disease to other sheep, rendering them useless. Once a sheep has been infected, the player may put it in the green goo where it heals. However, once it turns completely black, there is no way to restore it to its previous state. The only way to stop the sheep from getting infected is to kill the black sheep with a boulder. Sheep are fragile, and can be killed by enemies or accidentally. Sacrificing parts to the Part-O-Matic, like enemy tank pieces, sheep, boulders, or crates, allows the Part-O-Matic to constantly reproduce from the pre-determined queue randomly set up in-game. Crates, as the main resource, are found everywhere and can be carried by tanks and returned to the Part-O-Matic. One tank can hold four crates and sometimes crates can be difficult to obtain, so the default template is an array of powerful weapons on a 4-exhaust engine placed on water-tracks.

There are four main parts to make tanks in the game. The track determines which areas of terrain the tank can cross. These include wheels, which can only cross basic terrain, such as stone; half-tracks, which can cross over desert; snow-mobiles, which can cross over snow; boats, which can cross over water; and hover-crafts, which can cross over all terrain types. Making tanks without tracks renders them immobile. The engine determines not only how fast the tank can go, but how many weapons an individual tank can possess. Weapons weigh down tanks and make them slower. A tank with a total of five engine power and three weapons travels the same speed as a tank with a total of two engine power and no weapons. The weapons automatically shoot at enemies within its range. The player can place as many weapons in a tank as it has engine power, and can not exceed a fixed height limit. The player can also order tanks to attack a specific tank or area of terrain. There are over 60 weapons throughout the game. Finally, the radar only comes in one variety, and is needed to make the tanks function.

Power-ups are collected by being created by the Part-O-Matic and unlocked by buttons requiring a certain experience level of the tank that touches it. These buttons may also unlock certain areas or parts necessary to winning the game. Furthermore, there are boulders, movable by crane, which can be used as a Part-O-Matic resource, weapons, or walls from enemy tanks.

=== Terrain ===
There are four main types of terrain: ground, snow, desert, and water. Ground can be crossed by any track and can be composed of stone, grass, dirt, and so on. Snow, desert, and water are only crossable with the appropriate tracks. In addition, there is quicksand, which sinks tanks' tracks and any dropped objects; mud puddles, which cause tank tracks to get muddy and slow down until it is cleaned; lava, which burns anything that touches it until it is extinguished by water; acid, which damages anything that touches it until it is removed; and sheep-dip, a green goo which energizes sheep and cleans off parts.

=== Combat ===
In combat, each part has its own health. If the health reaches zero, the part will fly off the tank and be destroyed. If the tracks are destroyed, all but one engine will fall off and the tank will become immobile. If an engine is destroyed, and the remaining engines cannot support the number of weapons being used, weapons will fall off until the number of weapons matches the total engine power. If the radar is destroyed or the final engine is lost, the tank will cease to function, and lose all of its experience. The tank, unless ordered otherwise, will attack the closest enemy in range of its furthest weapon. If the tank is ordered to attack a specific enemy that is out of range of some weapons, the others will attack the closest enemy within range. Enemies will obey the same rules, except when attacking the Part-O-Matic. The destination of all enemies spawned after the start is the Part-O-Matic. When attacking the Part-O-Matic, enemies will ignore their surroundings. Enemies spawn at receiver points and move to the Part-O-Matic.

=== Objectives ===
The main objective in campaign mode is to destroy all enemy spawn points by first unlocking them by pressing buttons with certain level requirements, and then attacking the now exposed vulnerable center. Once all spawn points have been destroyed, all remaining tanks including those guarding points of interest will move in to attack. Once all enemy tanks have been destroyed, the player wins and completes the level. If the Part-O-Matic is destroyed, the player loses, but in the last level of each of the four worlds, the objective is to capture a transmitter from the "Evil Black Tanks" that guard them, and return it to the base. No enemy spawn points are present in these levels.
