= Mike Dailly (game designer) =

Scottish video game designer (born 1970)

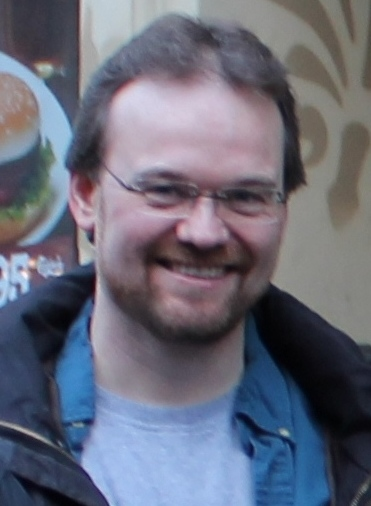
- Dailly in 2011
- Born: Michael Joseph Dailly; May 1970 (age 56); Dundee, Scotland
- Occupation: Video game designer
- Years active: 1989–present
- Organization: DMA Design
- Known for: Lemmings; Grand Theft Auto

Michael Joseph Dailly (born May 1970) is a Scottish video game designer, best known for his work on Lemmings (1991) and the original Grand Theft Auto (1997).

== Career ==
=== DMA Design ===
Dailly joined DMA Design in 1989 as the company's first employee, working for fellow Dundonian David Jones. They released Lemmings in 1991; It received critical acclaim and is estimated to have sold 20 million copies.

Dailly worked on the first two prototypes for DMA Design's next game, Grand Theft Auto, which was released in 1997. The game, while modestly received, later spawned a hugely successful franchise, which Dailly is credited having worked on while working for David Jones.

=== Later work ===
Between 2010 and 2018, Dailly worked with YoYo Games as the lead developer of the GameMaker: Studio game engine.

Dailly received the lifetime achievement award at the 2023 Scottish Games Awards. As of 2026, he heads Ogre Games Ltd., based in Dundee.

== Personal life ==
Dailly is a supporter of Scottish independence and a member of the Scottish National Party.
