= Gary Penn =

British computer game developer and reviewer

- Born: Berkhamsted, England
- Occupation: Head of Development at Denki

Gary Penn is a British computer game developer and former games reviewer. He wrote for Zzap!64 in the 1980s and he later was editor of The One from 1988 to 1990 and was Creative Director at DMA Design where he supervised the release of the first Grand Theft Auto game in 1997. Penn has described the game as taking years to develop and almost being cancelled.

In 2000 he listed his favorite games as Bomberman for the TurboGrafx-16, the arcade version of Defender, Doom, Elite for the BBC Micro, PaRappa the Rapper, Pokémon Red, Blue, and Yellow, Populous for the Amiga, The Sentinel for the Commodore 64, Super Mario Bros., and Tetris for the Game Boy.

Penn won the Games Media Legend award in 2007.

As of September 2011, he is head of development at Denki. Penn claims his magazine background helped him setting up a "Hollywood-style" studio system there:

It is something that was born of having a magazine background .. You don't have slippage, you're doing the same thing 12, 13, 14 times a year, so you get more practiced. It's like the notion of repertoire in the theatre, you have these tools, these methods of doing things, whereas in the game development business we always seem to be re-inventing the wheel.

Penn wrote the 2013 book Sensible Software 1986–1999 (ISBN 0-9575-7680-3).

== Works cited ==
- "The 100 best games of all time". Edge. No. 80. 2000.
