= Draconus =

1988 video game

- Developer: Zeppelin Games
- Publisher: Zeppelin Games
- Designers: Kevin Franklin; Ian Copeland; Brian Jobling; Michael Owens
- Composer: Adam Gilmore
- Platforms: Atari 8-bit; Commodore 64; ZX Spectrum
- Release: 1988
- Genre: Action-adventure
- Mode: Single-player

Draconus is an action-adventure platform game developed and published by Zeppelin Games in 1988. It was released for the Atari 8-bit computers, Commodore 64, and ZX Spectrum. Draconus is similar to Metroid.

== Gameplay ==
Frognum breathes fire

The player assumes the role of the hero, Frognum, whose task it is to reclaim his kingdom from the Tyrant beast. The game style is principally a platformer which finds the player running and jumping through various screens, numbering around a hundred. Many of the rooms include enemies, which generally follow fixed paths but may also swarm and chase the player. The player starts the game with two weapons: fire breath which is limited but may be replenished by collecting items, and a punch which is unlimited. Once destroyed, enemies do not respawn except in the C64 version, where they can respawn if a room that was only partly cleared is revisited. The main task is to find four special abilities and then face the final battle.

Enemy contact reduces Frognum's life energy, which may be refilled by collectible symbols. On loss of all life energy Frognum loses one life and restarts from the last Record slab. These slabs occur throughout the game world and serve as checkpoints. Impacting upon water whilst in a humanoid form generally results in immediate death, as does falling large distances or touching spikes.

== Reception ==
Reception

Review scores
Publication	Score
Crash	90%
Sinclair User	94/100
Zzap!64	92%

Awards
Publication	Award
Crash	Crash Smash
Sinclair User	SU Classic

The game twice placed #1 in the Readers' Top Ten of the German Atari Magazin.
