= Grand Theft Auto (video game) =

1997 action-adventure game

- UK cover art
- Developer: DMA Design (Note: Visual Sciences ported the game to the PlayStation. Tarantula Studios developed the Game Boy Color version.)
- Publishers: BMG Interactive: MS-DOS, Windows; EU: BMG Interactive; NA: ASC Games; PlayStation; EU: BMG Interactive; NA: Take-Two Interactive; Game Boy Color; Rockstar Games
- Director: Keith R. Hamilton
- Designers: Stephen Banks; Paul Farley; Billy Thomson
- Programmer: Keith R. Hamilton
- Artist: Ian McQue
- Writers: Brian Baglow; Brian Lawson
- Composers: Colin Anderson; Craig Conner; Grant Middleton
- Series: Grand Theft Auto
- Platforms: MS-DOS; Windows; PlayStation; Game Boy Color
- Release: 28 November 1997: MS-DOS, Windows; EU: 28 November 1997; NA: 24 March 1998; PlayStation; EU: 12 December 1997; NA: 30 June 1998; Game Boy Color; EU: 22 October 1999; NA: November 1999
- Genre: Action-adventure
- Modes: Single-player, multiplayer

Grand Theft Auto is a 1997 action-adventure game developed by DMA Design and published by BMG Interactive. It is the first game in the Grand Theft Auto series and was released in November 1997 for MS-DOS and Windows, in December 1997 for the PlayStation and in October 1999 for the Game Boy Color. The game's narrative follows a criminal who climbs in status within the criminal underworld across three fictional cities, inspired by real-life locations. The gameplay is presented from a top-down perspective. It takes place within an open-world environment where the player must gather several points ranging in the millions to progress through the game's chapters. Points are gathered by completing various missions throughout each city, although the player can also gather points through other means.

Grand Theft Auto began development as Race 'n' Chase, in which the player controlled a police officer pursuing criminals. However, the game was considered dull, and the concept of playing as a criminal was adopted. The development team worked to ensure that the player would have the freedom to play however they wanted. Grand Theft Auto created much controversy even before its launch due to its violent content, with discussions about banning its sale. The marketing campaign, organised by publicist Max Clifford, exploited this stirring of controversy as free promotion.

Grand Theft Auto received mixed reviews but was a commercial success. While the graphics and controls were criticised, the entertainment value, sound design, and freedom of the gameplay were praised, and it has since been recognised as one of the greatest games of all time. Two expansions taking place in 1960s England, Grand Theft Auto: London 1969 and Grand Theft Auto: London 1961, were launched in 1999. The success of Grand Theft Auto spawned a series of games built upon the original's gameplay and themes; the Grand Theft Auto series has since become one of the most popular and best-selling video game franchises of all time. Grand Theft Auto 2 was released in October 1999.

== Gameplay ==
Gameplay image, showing the top-down view in Liberty City

Grand Theft Auto is made up of six levels split between three main cities; each locale is based on a real-life city in the United States, with an alternative name: Liberty City (New York City), San Andreas (San Francisco), and Vice City (Miami). The progression is linear, as each level completed automatically unlocks the next one in the chain. Players begin a game choosing a character from among eight—four in the PlayStation version—and naming them, though the choice is purely aesthetic, and does not affect the overall gameplay. In each level, the player's ultimate objective is to reach a target number of points, which starts at $1,000,000 but becomes higher in the later levels, and then reach the level's "goal" to complete the stage. The player is free to do whatever they want, but have limited lives. Points can be gained from anything, such as causing death and destruction amid the traffic in the city, completing special challenges, or stealing and selling cars for profit. However, the more typical means to achieve their target is to perform tasks for the level's local crime syndicate. Jobs can be initiated by visiting and touching a ringing telephone box, with each level's set of jobs on offer being unique.

Jobs can be completed in any order, and each has some level of freedom, though each location is fixed. Successful completion of a job awards the player points, unlocks harder missions with greater rewards, and provides a "multiplier"—a bonus that increases the value of points earned from completing jobs and actions. Failing a job by not completing objectives, being arrested, or dying secures no points and can seal off other tasks. Players can find equipment across the level's map to help them with jobs and making points, including weapons and body armour, increasing the player's survival against attacks from enemies. If the player is killed (referred to in the game as "Wasted"), they lose a life, all their current equipment, and have their multiplier bonus reset; losing all their lives will result in players having to restart a level. Law enforcement is present at each level, and committing criminal actions will cause the player to raise their notoriety with the police; the higher the level, the tougher the response. If the player is arrested, they forfeit all equipment and have their multiplier bonus halved. PC versions of the game were released with networked multiplayer gameplay using the IPX protocol.

== Plot ==
=== Characters ===
The player can choose between eight protagonists to control at the beginning of the game, though this choice does not affect the gameplay or story. The player character interacts with prominent criminals throughout the story: Robert "Bubby" Seragliano is the supposed head of the notorious Vercotti crime family and is driven to avenge his father's death; Uncle Fu is the ancient leader of a Chinese gang in conflict with a Latino gang led by El Burro; Samuel Deever is a corrupt Vice City police officer suspected of several crimes; and Brother Marcus is the leader of the Brotherhood of Jah Army of Love and the biggest drug dealer in Vice City.

=== Story ===
The protagonist begins their career in Liberty City working for Robert "Bubby" Seragliano's gang. After completing many jobs, they are warned by a rival gang that their actions are causing great harm to their boss, Sonetti. The protagonist continues working for Seragliano and kills Sonetti. After more work, Bubby praises the protagonist's efforts, but warns that the police surround the gang, and it would be a good idea for them to leave town.

As soon as the protagonist arrives in San Andreas, they are contacted by Uncle Fu's gang and begin working for them. After doing some work for the gang, they meet in person with Fu, who expresses his gratitude for their services and states that their actions have brought honour to the family. The protagonist enters the service of El Burro. Again, after several jobs, the protagonist meets the grateful boss in person, who sends them to Vice City.

The protagonist's actions catch the attention of corrupt police officer Samuel Deever, who claims to have evidence that could condemn them to life imprisonment and blackmails them into working for him. The cycle repeats itself, and the two meet in person, with Deever warning the protagonist to be careful with their actions. They then start working for the Rastafarians until they meet their leader, Brother Marcus, who commends the protagonist for doing an excellent job and offers them a large payout while stating they'll never see each other again. The player receives their retirement money, and the game ends.

== Development ==
Mock-up for Race'n'Chase, the original title for Grand Theft Auto

The development of Grand Theft Auto began on 4 April 1995 at DMA Design in Dundee. It originally had a protracted four-year development, which included a title change and numerous attempts to halt development. The game was originally titled Race'n'Chase. It was originally planned to be released on MS-DOS, Windows 95, PlayStation, Sega Saturn and the Nintendo 64. However, it was never released for the latter two consoles. During the development of Grand Theft Auto, many people overseeing the game's progress attempted to halt the development, which led the crew at DMA Design to convince them to allow them to continue.

According to The Guardian, there were specific milestones planned for Grand Theft Auto, none of which were met: development began on 4 April 1995, the game design was completed on 31 May 1995, the engine was completed on 3 July 1995, the look and feel was completed on 2 October 1995, play testing began on 3 January 1996, the game was in alpha stages on 1 April 1996, and production ended on 1 July 1996. An original design document, dated 22 March 1995, was posted online by Mike Dailly on 22 March 2011. The credited author of the document is K.R. Hamilton, and the released version is 1.05. It contained information about game elements discussed in various meetings held from 23 January 1995 to the document's writing.

According to the original design document, the introduction to Grand Theft Auto is a pre-drawn/rendered animation. The Windows 95 version was developed using Visual C++ v2.0. The DOS version was developed using Watcom C/C++ v10, Microsoft MASM 6.1, and Rational Systems DOS extender (DOS4GW) v 1.97. The program used to make Grand Theft Auto was said to produce "a 3D array which can [be] used by both the perspective and the isometric engines". It was said to consist of "a grid editor which is used to place blocks on a grid, with a [separate] grid for each level", and "allow any block to be placed at any level". It was said that the world may have had to be 256×256×6 blocks. The original concept of Grand Theft Auto was "to produce a fun, addictive and fast multi-player car racing and crashing game which uses a novel graphics method". David Jones, the game's producer, cited Pac-Man as an influence. He noted that the player runs over pedestrians and gets similarly chased by police to Pac-Man.

Gary Penn, creative director of DMA at the time, cited Elite as a major influence, "But I'd been working on Frontier, which is very different and there were other people on the team who had things like Syndicate, Mercenary and Elite very much in their minds as well. That combination led to the more open plan structure that exists now. The game as it stands now is basically Elite in a city, but without quite the same sense of taking on the jobs. You take on the jobs in a slightly different way, but incredibly similar structurally. It's just a much more acceptable real-world setting. The game was cops and robbers, which evolved fairly quickly—nobody wants to be the cop, it's more fun to be bad. And then that evolved into Grand Theft Auto". In an early 1997 interview, project leader Keith Hamilton commented, "GTA was harder than we thought. We're rewriting the handling of the cars at the moment. We've got the time to change the graphics to 24-bit."

== Release ==
The original Grand Theft Auto was developed for MS-DOS, but then later ported to Windows (using SciTech MGL), PlayStation (developed by Visual Sciences using their "ViSOS" framework), and Game Boy Color. The MS-DOS and Windows versions were published in Europe by BMG Interactive on 28 November 1997, followed by the PlayStation version on 12 December 1997. In North America, the game was published by ASC Games for MS-DOS and Windows on 24 March 1998, and by Take-Two Interactive for the PlayStation on 30 June 1998. The Game Boy Color version, developed by Tarantula Studios, was published by Rockstar Games in Europe on 22 October 1999, and in North America in November.

The Game Boy Color version had very similar levels and missions, which was quite a technical achievement, due to the sheer size of the cities, converted tile-for-tile from the PC original, making them many times larger than most Game Boy Color game worlds were because of the handheld's limited hardware. However, the game had simplified graphics and sounds, and the train is replaced by teleports. The GBC version was also heavily toned down to target younger demographic, with most gore and swearing removed.

The PC version comes in several different executables for DOS and MS-Windows, which use a single set of data files (except for the 8-bit colour DOS version, which uses different but similar graphics). It was previously available as a free download as part of the Rockstar Classics (alongside Wild Metal and Grand Theft Auto 2); however, the free download service is currently unavailable.

Grand Theft Auto was to be released on the Sega Saturn. However, due to the console's rapid decline in popularity before development was finished, the project was halted, and the game was never released. After the PlayStation's successful release, development began on Grand Theft Auto 64, a port of the game for the Nintendo 64, rumoured to have graphical enhancements and new missions. However, development was cancelled without ever having a public appearance. In March 2001, Take-Two Interactive announced Global Star Software would publish a version of the game for PalmPilot by the holiday season in Europe and North America; Global Star released a demo for Palm OS on its website. According to fansite Gouranga!, the project was cancelled by June 2002.

=== Cover art ===
The UK cover art for Grand Theft Auto is a photograph of a New York Police Department 1980s Plymouth Gran Fury rushing through the intersection of Fifth Avenue and 56th Street, with Trump Tower in the background of the picture. Several alternate box arts were released for different regions, including the artwork for the PC release in the US which features a yellow car, the European PC and PlayStation releases exhibiting the design used in later iterations of the series, and several Japanese covers including one featuring the Statue of Liberty. The UK cover art was also an alternative cover for Grand Theft Auto 2 in selected markets.

== Soundtrack ==
The freedom of the game's open world led the DMA team to believe that players would like to listen to different music while driving around the city. So they came up with the idea of several radio stations that would play music from various genres. Three DMA members – Colin Anderson, Craig Conner, and Grant Middleton – composed the radio tracks and recorded them at night in the company's offices. Grand Theft Auto features seven radio stations and a police band track. All can be heard when the player enters a vehicle; however, each vehicle only receives a limited number of stations. Players can remove the game's CD when it has finished loading and replace it with another one with their music. When the character enters a car, the game randomly plays music from the CD. The game's main theme was composed by Conner and credited to the fictional band Da Shootaz. Except Head Radio, the names of songs and radio stations are never mentioned within the game. Colin Anderson released early mixes of several of the radio songs beginning in November 2022, in recognition of the 25th anniversary of the release of the game.

== Reception ==
Reception

Aggregate score
Aggregator	Score
GameRankings	PC: 79% PS: 68% GBC: 57%

Review scores
Publication	Score
Computer and Video Games	PS: 7/10
Electronic Gaming Monthly	PS: 7.5/10, 6.5/10, 5/10, 7/10
Game Informer	PS: 7.75/10
GamePro	PS: 2/5
GameRevolution	PS: B
GameSpot	PC: 6.4/10; PS: 8/10
IGN	PS: 6/10; GBC: 4/10
Next Generation	PC: 4/5
Nintendo Power	GBC: 6.2/10
PlayStation Official Magazine – UK	PS: 7/10

The game received mixed reviews. GameSpot's 1998 review for Grand Theft Auto said that, although the graphics may look "a little plain", the music and sound effects are the opposite, praising the radio stations and the sound effects used to open and close vehicles. They also praised the freedom of the game, favouring it over other games that make the player follow a specific rule set and complete specific missions in a specific order.

IGN was critical of the graphics, which were said to be "really quite shoddy" and dated. They were also unimpressed by the "fast-food programming and careless design", including the controls. Overall, the game was considered fun but with problems that could have been fixed.

Next Generation reviewed the PC version of the game, rating it 4/5, and stated that "It is quite easy to accuse Grand Theft Auto of being all style and no substance, but the charge doesn't stick. Of course, we don't condone the acts within, but there is no denying that the game is well-executed and quite enjoyable." Grand Theft Auto was banned by the Justice Ministry of Brazil; at the time, Brazil was confronting homicides and fatal auto accidents. Grand Theft Auto has been named one of the greatest video games by several publications. (Note: Attributed to multiple sources)

=== Sales ===
Global shipments to retailers of Grand Theft Auto's computer and PlayStation versions had surpassed 1 million units combined by November 1998. At the 1999 Milia festival in Cannes, it took home a "Gold" prize for revenues above €17 million in the European Union during 1998. The game maintained a top-20 position on the UK charts for at least 76 weeks, rising to the second-highest position in May 1999 after the release of London 1969. It sold 3.5 million units by October 1999, and 6 million by March 2001.
