= Star Wars: The Clone Wars (disambiguation) =

Star Wars: The Clone Wars primarily refers to a multimedia franchise that began in 2008, consisting of an animated film and an animated television series.

Star Wars: The Clone Wars may also refer to:

== Books and comics ==
- Star Wars: The Clone Wars (novel), a 2008 novelization of the film
- The Clone Wars Legacy
- Star Wars: The Clone Wars Comic UK, volumes 5 and 6 (2009–2013) of Star Wars Comic UK

== Film and television ==
- Star Wars: The Clone Wars (TV series), an animated TV series (2008–2014, 2020)
  - Star Wars: The Clone Wars (film), a 2008 theatrical film serving as the pilot for the series
  - Siege of Mandalore, final arc of the series

== Music ==
- Star Wars: The Clone Wars (Original Motion Picture Soundtrack), by Kevin Kiner (2008)
- Star Wars: The Clone Wars (Original Soundtrack Seasons One through Six), by Kevin Kiner (2014)
- Star Wars: The Clone Wars – The Final Season (Episode 1–12) [Original Soundtrack], by Kevin Kiner (2020)

== Games ==
- Star Wars: The Clone Wars (video game), developed by Pandemic Studios and published by LucasArts
- Star Wars: The Clone Wars – Republic Heroes
- Star Wars: The Clone Wars – Lightsaber Duels
- Clone Wars Adventures, based on the Star Wars: The Clone Wars franchise.

== List ==
- List of Star Wars: The Clone Wars episodes

== See also ==
- Clone Wars (disambiguation)
