= All New World of Lemmings =

1994 video game

- Developer: DMA Design
- Publisher: Psygnosis
- Producer: David Jones
- Programmers: Russel Elliot; Robert Parsons; Keith R. Hamilton; Steven Reid
- Artists: David Osborne; Gary Timmons
- Series: Lemmings
- Platforms: MS-DOS, Amiga
- Release: November 25, 1994
- Genre: Puzzle
- Mode: Single-player

All New World of Lemmings is a puzzle video game released in 1994 for the Amiga and MS-DOS as the third game in the Lemmings series. In North America, the game was named The Lemmings Chronicles. It was published by Psygnosis and was the last Lemmings game developed by DMA Design.

The gameplay is similar to the original games, requiring the player to lead all the lemmings to their exit by giving them the appropriate skills.

== Plot ==
The storyline of All New World of Lemmings continues where Lemmings 2 left off. Of the twelve tribes that escaped from Lemming Island, the adventures of three tribes are followed in this game: the Shadow tribe, the Classic tribe, and the Egyptian tribe. Each tribe leaves the flying Ark they escaped on, and finds their own island to explore.

== Gameplay ==
All New World of Lemmings represents the lemmings with larger graphics than in previous Lemmings games, and introduced enemies and an alternative way of giving lemmings skills. The game has a total of 90 levels, 30 for each tribe. Like in the previous game, the lemmings saved in one level are the ones left for the next one.

Five skills are available in each level, while others can be given when a lemming picks up an item. A new "replay" mode allows a player to automatically redo everything done before in a level, with the option to continue playing at any given point. Practice levels are available with every available item to experiment with.

== Development ==
Mike Dailly, programmer at DMA Design, recounted that "Lemmings 3 was a bit crap … more to end our commitment to Psygnosis than actually do a good game. The larger character size really spoiled it, but it was done like that because we had been approached by the Children's Television Workshop who wanted to use the character and the game; they wanted the characters to be bigger, and that really complicated things, and spoiled it. By the end of Lemmings 3, I think we were all ready to move on." DMA Design head David Jones similarly remarked, "We needed a break for a while after Lemmings. Three years of hell." A 3DO Interactive Multiplayer version was announced to be in development and slated to be published by Psygnosis during E3 1995, however, this port was never released for unknown reasons.

== Reception ==
A reviewer for Next Generation gave the MS-DOS version three out of five stars, commenting that "Although the basic idea is still to save the suicidal beasts, DMA has carefully avoided the 'more of the same' trap by increasing the size of the lemmings, laying down some fantastic new backgrounds, and adding a host of features ... An excellent new perspective on an old stand-by."

== Sequels ==
The next game in the Lemmings series is 3D Lemmings (1995), which abandons the storyline and most features from Lemmings 2 and All New World of Lemmings.
