= Clone =

Clone and related terms may refer to any of the following:

== Biology ==
- Clone (cell biology), a group of identical cells that share a common ancestry
  - Clone (B-cell), a lymphocyte clone, the massive presence of which may indicate a pathological condition
- Clonal colony, a group of genetically identical individuals (plants, fungi, bacteria), grown vegetatively from a single ancestor
- Clonal plant, a new plant that grows from a fragment of the parent plant
  - King Clone, a clonal creosote bush in the Mojave Desert, United States
- Cloning, the production of any organism whose genetic information is identical to that of a parent organism from which it was created
  - Commercial animal cloning, the cloning of animals for commercial purposes
  - Horse cloning, the cloning of horses
  - Human cloning, the cloning of humans

== Computing and technology ==
- Clone (computing), computer hardware or software designed to function in the same way as an original
  - Macintosh clone, a Classic Mac OS computer not made by Apple
  - Video game clone, a software game or game franchise heavily inspired by another
- clone (Java method), a method in the Java programming language for object duplication
- clone (Linux system call), a Linux system call that creates a copy of a process
- Clone, a popular term for a replica, particularly when referring to "recreations" of rare and desirable variants of collector cars
- Clone, a popular term for an unlicensed, reverse-engineered copy of a firearm produced in another nation—although the term can also apply to a simple direct copy, created under license
- Clone tool, a tool used in image manipulation programs
- Disk cloning, the duplication of contents of computer storage volumes
- Lego clones, building block products meant to interoperate with Lego blocks
- Phone cloning, the copying of identity from one cellular device to another
- Quantum cloning, the replication of a quantum state

== Culture ==
- "Castro clone", a LGBTQ cultural term

== Mathematics ==
- Clone (algebra), a collection of functions with certain properties
- Clone (voting), in voting systems analysis, a candidate identical to one already present in an election

== Places ==
- Clones, County Fermanagh, Ireland
- Clones, County Monaghan, a town in Ireland
- Clones railway station, Ireland

== Arts, entertainment, and media ==
=== Comics ===
- Clone (comic), a 2012–2014 comic book series
- "Clone Saga", a storyline from Marvel Comics' Spider-Man comic books

=== Films ===
- Parts: The Clonus Horror, a 1979 American independent film
- Cloned (film), a 1997 American made-for-television film
- Clone (2010 film), a 2010 British film, originally released as Womb
- The Clones (film), a 1973 American film directed by Lamar Card

=== Television ===
- O Clone, a 2001–2002 Brazilian telenovela
- Clone High, a 2002 American animated TV show
- Clone (TV series), a 2008 BBC comedy series
- El Clon (TV series), a 2010 Spanish-language telenovela

=== Literature ===
- "The Clone", a 1959 short story by Theodore L. Thomas
- The Clone (novel), a 1965 novel by Theodore L. Thomas and Kate Wilhelm
- Clones (anthology), a 1998 short-story anthology edited by Jack Dann and Gardner Dozois
- The Clone series, a series of novels by Steven L. Kent

=== Music ===
==== Albums ====
- Clone (Threshold album), a 1998 album by Threshold
- Clone (Leo Kottke and Mike Gordon album), a 2002 album by Leo Kottke and Mike Gordon
- Clones (album), a 2003 album by The Neptunes

==== Songs ====
- "Clone", a song by Gojira from their album Terra Incognita
- "Clone", a song by Metric from their album Synthetica
- "Clone", a song by Vision of Disorder from their album Imprint
- "Clones", a 2004 single by Ash from Meltdown
- "Clones", a song by Chevelle from their album Hats Off to the Bull
- "Clones", a song by Cult of Luna from their album The Beyond
- "Clones", a song by The Roots on the album Illadelph Halflife
- "Clones (We're All)", a song recorded by Alice Cooper on his Flush the Fashion album

=== Other uses in arts, entertainment, and media ===
- Clones (video game), a 2010 puzzle strategy video game by Tomkorp Computer Solutions
- Clone Hero, a 2022 rhythm video game by Ryan Foster
- Clone Wars (disambiguation)

== See also ==
- Clon (disambiguation)
- Clonal (disambiguation)
- Cloning (disambiguation)
- List of animals that have been cloned
