= Victoria Frankenstein =

Victoria Frankenstein may refer to:

- Victoria Frankenstein, the lead character in Frankenstein (2007 film)
- Victoria Frankenstein, a Marvel Comics character that appears in the stories of Frankenstein's Monster (Marvel Comics)
