= Clone Wars (disambiguation) =

The Clone Wars is a series of conflicts in the fictional Star Wars universe.

Clone Wars may also refer to:

== Star Wars ==
=== Books and comics ===
- Star Wars: Clone Wars (comics), various comic series and trade paperbacks
- Star Wars: Clone Wars, a 2008 photo comic adaptation of the TV series
- Star Wars: The Clone Wars (novel), a 2008 novelization of the film
- Star Wars: The Clone Wars Comic UK, volumes 5 and 6 (2009–2013) of Star Wars Comic UK

=== Characters ===
- Clone trooper, class of soldiers

=== Film and television ===
- Star Wars: Clone Wars (2003 TV series), an animated micro TV series (2003–2005)
- Star Wars: The Clone Wars (2008 TV series), an animated TV series (2008–2014, 2020)
  - Star Wars: The Clone Wars (film), a 2008 theatrical film serving as the pilot for the series
- Star Wars: Episode II – Attack of the Clones, a 2002 film

=== Music ===
- Star Wars: The Clone Wars (Original Motion Picture Soundtrack), by Kevin Kiner (2008)
- Star Wars: The Clone Wars (Original Soundtrack Seasons One through Six), by Kevin Kiner (2014)
- Star Wars: The Clone Wars – The Final Season (Episode 1-12) [Original Soundtrack], by Kevin Kiner (2020)

=== Games ===
- Star Wars: The Clone Wars (video game), developed by Pandemic Studios and published by LucasArts
- Clone Wars Adventures
- Lego Star Wars III: The Clone Wars, a 2011 video game for multiple platforms, such as Playstation 3, Xbox 360, PC, PSP and Nintendo DS
- Star Wars: The Clone Wars, a 2022 board game

== Marvel ==
- X-Men 2: Clone Wars, a 1995 video game

== See also ==
- Star Wars: The Clone Wars (disambiguation)
