= Lemmings (2006 video game) =

- Cover of the PSP version
- Developer: Team17 (Note: Rusty Nutz developed the PlayStation 2 port, while d3t developed the PlayStation Mobile port.)
- Publisher: Sony Computer Entertainment
- Composer: Tim Follin
- Series: Lemmings
- Platforms: PlayStation Portable, PlayStation 2, PlayStation Mobile
- Release: 9 March 2006: PlayStation Portable; JP: 9 March 2006; UK: 10 March 2006; NA: 23 May 2006; PlayStation 2; EU: 13 October 2006; AU: 19 October 2006; PlayStation 3; NA: 7 December 2006; JP: 14 December 2006; PAL: 23 March 2007
- Genre: Puzzle
- Mode: Single-player

Lemmings is a 2006 video game developed by Team17 and published by Sony Computer Entertainment. It is a remake of the original Lemmings released in 1991.

The game has been released in slightly different versions for PlayStation Portable, PlayStation 2, and PlayStation Mobile.

== Gameplay ==
The PSP version featured all 120 levels from the original game, 36 brand new levels as well as expansion pack support, and a user level editor. Every level in the game was a pre-rendered 3D landscape, although their gameplay was still 2D and remains faithful to the original game. User levels could be constructed from pre-rendered objects and distributed by uploading them to a PlayStation-specific Lemmings online community.

In October 2006 the game was ported by developer Rusty Nutz for the PlayStation 2 with use of the EyeToy. While being recorded by the EyeToy, players stretch and move their limbs to aid the lemmings. In 2012, d3t produced a similar remake of Lemmings for the PlayStation Mobile framework for download on certified Xperia and HTC One mobile phones, tablets made by Sony, and the PlayStation Vita handheld console. The game had similar graphical improvements to the PSP title, and also incorporated touch controls.

== Reception ==
Reception

Aggregate scores
Aggregator	Score
GameRankings	PSP: 77% PS2: 68%
Metacritic	PSP: 76/100

Review scores
Publication	Score
GameSpot	PSP: 8/10
IGN	PSP: 7.8/10

The PSP version received generally positive reviews. The PSP version holds a Metacritic score of 76/100 based on 46 critics, indicating "generally favorable reviews".

IGN gave the PSP version of the game 7.8/10, praising the graphics and the enhanced longevity given by the editor, but criticizing the unexciting sound. The PS3 version received a score of 7.5/10, with the comment "It doesn't reinvent the wheel, but it rolls just fine."

GameSpot gave the PSP version of the game 8/10, praising the polished visuals and audio, the level designer and the online sharing feature.
