= Lemmings 2: The Tribes =

1993 video game

- Developer: DMA Design (Note: Ported to Game Boy by Spidersoft and to Mega Drive by Digital Developments)
- Publisher: Psygnosis
- Programmers: David Jones; Andy Whyte; Brian Watson
- Artists: Gary Timmons; David Osborne; Graeme Anderson; Martin Good
- Composers: Raymond Usher; Brian Johnston; David Whittaker
- Series: Lemmings
- Platforms: Amiga, Atari ST, MS-DOS, Mega Drive, Super NES, Game Boy, Acorn Archimedes, FM Towns
- Release: February 26, 1993 (Amiga, DOS, ST)
- Genre: Puzzle
- Mode: Single player

Lemmings 2: The Tribes is a 1993 puzzle strategy video game developed by DMA Design and published by Psygnosis, and is the sequel to the 1991 video game Lemmings. Similar to the original title, the game sees the player guiding anthropomorphised lemmings through a number of levels, using various skills to help them reach the exit. Expanding on the mechanics of the original game, Lemmings 2 introduced an overarching narrative and featured a more open-ended series of levels based around different 'tribes' of lemmings, also increasing the number of available skills and simplifying the requirements for clearing levels. Development of Lemmings 2 was more intensive, with Psygnosis having greater involvement in attempt to recreate the success of the original game. A focus on the production of the game was cross-development of a large number of ports, with the game released to consoles including the Mega Drive, Super NES and Game Boy. Lemmings 2 was a commercial success and received positive reviews from critics, with praise directed towards its additional gameplay mechanics and greater variety of levels and abilities.

== Gameplay ==
A screenshot of gameplay in Lemmings 2: The Tribes.

Lemmings 2 is divided in a series of twelve thematic worlds corresponding to the titular tribes, each containing ten levels of obstacles, traps and other hazards. The goal of each level is to guide a group of lemmings from their entry point(s) to one or more available exits within a set time limit, by assigning a limited pool of various skills to the autonomous individual creatures to create a safe passage for the group. Unlike in the case of its predecessor, there are no variable requirements to clear each level in Lemmings 2, and players only need to deliver a single lemming—from the tribe of sixty that begins the traversal of each world—to the exit of a level in order to gain access to the next. As the number of remaining lemmings is carried over throughout the levels of a world, and as some levels require the collaboration of several lemmings for a successful solution to be implemented, earlier levels may need to be replayed to ensure enough lemmings survive. For each level, a gold, silver, or bronze medal ranking is granted depending on the number of lemmings that reach the exit.

As in Lemmings, each level grants the player a certain number of uses for a specific set of skills; however, the game features not only the eight original skills from the first game, but 43 new skills to be employed by the different tribes. These skills can either perform one-time commands or assign permanent abilities to a lemming, and they differ in their general purpose: skills like Runner and Icarus Wings overcome obstacles and hazards by enhancing a lemming's mobility; others like Builder and Planter add terrain to the level, creating crossings and barriers; the opposite is achieved with skills like Miner and Bazooker; and yet others like Blocker and Attractor alter the behavior of neighboring lemmings. A new feature is an unlimited 'fan' tool that the player can control directly to propel lemmings assigned with relevant skills that are affected by its proximity and position (such as Ballooner and Surfer) and to power mechanisms found throughout the levels. In addition, besides the option to pause the game and the ability to "nuke" all the lemmings to reset a level when facing a "no-win" situation, Lemmings 2 also allows the player to fast forward the progression of the game.

The twelve tribes of lemmings—which include "Highland", "Cavelem", and "Circus" lemmings among others—feature variations in appearance and cultural exuberance that otherwise have no effect in the general gameplay; and though certain skills are made available more frequently in the levels of certain worlds, no skill is exclusive to just one tribe. An exception to both cases is the "Classic" tribe, which, uniquely, preserves the Blocker skill from the original Lemmings and rolls back some updated behavioral quirks of the titular creatures to resemble their original outing more closely.

Players can freely choose the order in which they tackle the different worlds, and to check and save their global progress from a main menu. A practice mode is available as well, allowing to try out a set of any eight skills in one of four different practice levels. In order to complete the game, a player must secure all twelve parts of a golden talisman, each granted by clearing all ten levels of a world with a gold medal ranking.

== Plot ==
Once upon a time, the twelve tribes of Lemming Island lived joyfully and peacefully. However, an ancient prophecy foretells a great darkness soon to cover the island. This prophecy tells that the only way the lemmings can live is by getting off their island using the power of the Lemming Talisman. This talisman consists of twelve pieces, with one owned by each tribe. With the help of the player, the lemmings must reach the center of the island in order to escape their doom.

== Development ==
Lemmings 2 was developed by British developer DMA Design and published by Psygnosis, although programmer Brian Watson stated that the publisher played a more involved role in "helping with the game design and production" for the sequel. Development was marked by considerable pressure to recreate the crossover success of the original game, and greater time was dedicated by lead programmer David Jones to consider how the game would port to multiple platforms. Developer Mike Dailly stated that the sequel's focus on tribes was conceived as a way of creating a more open-ended structure to the game, with Dailly describing the feature as "a way to give (the player at least some choice) when stuck on a level" and "create more gameplay and make the game last longer." The inclusion of a fast forward feature was adopted from an aborted arcade port, with the feature originally intended to complement "the fast pace of arcade machines", though Dailly has remarked that once they saw the feature they "just had to have it", and that "it's now very hard to play the original Lemmings" without it.

Lemmings 2 was initially released for MS-DOS, Amiga, and Atari ST on February 26, 1993, and was extensively ported to other systems, including Mega Drive, Super Nintendo Entertainment System, and Game Boy. To accommodate the capabilities of consoles, the game was modified across versions to support reduced levels, skills, and numbers of lemmings on-screen. Dailly stated that the porting process was "much more complex" in an attempt to "make console versions much better", citing the Super NES version of the game as "one of the most complex games I've had to write." Psygnosis allocated Dailly additional time to complete the ports, allowing for the inclusion of tweaks and improvements, such as a parallax background and additional animations and sound effects. The Super NES version features compatibility with the Super NES Mouse, as well as the Super Scope via a hidden easter egg. Although ports of the game were developed for the Master System and Game Gear by Spidersoft, they were not published.

== Reception ==
Reception

Review scores
Publication	Score
Computer and Video Games	83% (Game Boy); 79% (Mega Drive); 84% (SNES)
Electronic Gaming Monthly	7.8 (SNES)
GamePro	3.5/3.5/4.0/3.5 (Mega Drive); 4.0/4.5/4.0/4.5 (SNES)
Hyper	88% (Mega Drive/SNES)
Next Generation	4/5 (Mega Drive)
ST Format	96% (Amiga)
VideoGames & Computer Entertainment	10/10 (DOS)

Lemmings 2 was not quite as popular as Lemmings was, nor was it ported to as many platforms. In the United Kingdom, it was the top-selling Amiga game in February 1993, and the top-selling PC game in March 1993.

The game was well received by critics, who widely considered it to be better than the original game. Bruce and Margaret Howden of Compute! commented "This sequel is packed with cute, engaging new features, more Lemming abilities, and oodles of new scenarios. If the original Lemmings was a perfect arcade game, then this is perfection improved upon." Computer Gaming World stated that Psygnosis had done "a first rate job with this sequel ... Lemmings 2 really is twice the game its predecessor was", with "lovingly designed" puzzles and "delightful animations", and concluded that it would be one of the "better purchases of the year". Computer Gaming World praised the game's "lovingly designed" puzzles and highlighted the game's "delightful animations, clever puzzles, soundtrack with original music for each tribe [and] people-friendly interface."

Reviewing the Genesis version, GamePro commented that the controls themselves are easy to use but the small size of the lemmings makes it difficult to control them with any precision. However, they praised the variety and creativity of the level design and the different lemming maneuvers, as well as the game's "charming" personality and wide range of difficulty, and gave it an overall recommendation. They made similar comments of the Super NES version, and remarked that the game "adds nonlinear variety to the cartoony brainteasers mix." The five reviewers of Electronic Gaming Monthly were also pleased, with Mike Weigand commenting, "This title adds some nice twists [and graphics] to the standard guidetheLemmingstosafety theme, making it a must for veterans of the games."

Next Generation reviewed the Genesis version of the game, and stated that "Lemmings fanatics are sure to love the new features and for those who've never experienced a Lemmings game, we strongly suggest checking this game out."

In a 2001 retrospective review, Rosemary Young wrote in Quandary that "Lemmings 2: Tribes will be hard to find now because of its age but, really, it's hardly aged at all. Although a little 'flat' the graphics are still perfectly good and the puzzles are just as fiendish. It compares very well with later Lemmings titles such as 3D Lemmings and Lemmings Revolution even if it doesn't offer the opportunity to save mid level."

Lemmings 2 was named Best Action/Arcade Game at the 1994 Codie awards. In 1995, Total! ranked the game 33rd on their Top 100 SNES Games writing: "This took the original format and piled on loads of new levels, a range of new lemmings and basically just gave us more of what we liked, only better."
