= The Adventures of Lomax =

1996 video game

- European PlayStation box art by Tim Beaumont
- Developer: Psygnosis
- Publisher: Psygnosis
- Producer: Greg Duddle
- Designer: Henk Nieborg
- Programmer: Erwin Kloibhofer
- Composer: PC Music Ltd.
- Series: Lemmings
- Platforms: PlayStation, Windows
- Release: NA: 22 October 1996; EU: November 1996; JP: 18 December 1997
- Genre: Platform
- Mode: Single-player

The Adventures of Lomax (known in Europe as Lomax) is a 1996 platform video game developed and published by Psygnosis for the PlayStation and Microsoft Windows. It is a spin-off video game of the Lemmings series. The player takes the role of Lomax, a lemming knight who must save his fellow lemmings who have been brainwashed by the wicked sorcerer Evil Ed.

== Plot ==
Lomax is a lemming knight whose friends have been transformed into monsters by Evil Ed, a cruel lemming wizard. He must embark on a quest through Lemmingland to save them, and eventually defeat Evil Ed. Along his journey, he can receive help from the elderly wizard Lorock, who gives advice.

== Gameplay ==
This game inherits the gameplay and style which was seen in Erwin Kloibhofer and Henk Nieborg's previous title, Flink. As Lomax, the player must navigate through four main worlds with three levels each, in a side-scrolling platform game. The enemies are brainwashed lemmings who have been turned into deadly monsters taking the form of zombies, cowboys, and aliens. The player's main attack spins Lomax around, and can be used to both avoid being killed by bumping into enemies, and defeat them. When defeated, enemies are turned back into ordinary lemmings, and true to type, they then jump off the nearest ledge. There are coins scattered throughout the levels that grant additional lives when enough are found. Magic helmets can also be found, which can be used as weapons and grant Lomax immunity from one attack, after which he loses the helmet.

In addition to the standard platforming, Lomax is also able to use several abilities featured in the original Lemmings, such as building bridges and blowing up obstacles, as well as others not found in the original.

== Reception ==
Reception

Review scores
Publication	Score
Electronic Gaming Monthly	7.5/10, 8/10, 7.5/10, 7/10 (PS)
GameSpot	7.7/10 (PS)
Next Generation	2/5 (PS)
MAN!AC	80/100

A reviewer for Next Generation gave the game a generally negative review, remarking that while "The Adventures of Lomax isn't all bad for a side-scroller", the storyline was uninteresting and the 2D platform genre had been played out. Reviewers for GameSpot and Electronic Gaming Monthly, however, felt that a new 2D platform jumper was a breath of fresh air since there had been no new entries in the genre for a while. They further remarked that the colorful graphics, smooth animation, and fun gameplay make it stand out even among other 2D platformers. EGM's Crispin Boyer said "it proves that PlayStation titles don't have to be 3-D to be good", and GameSpot's Hugh Sterbakov concluded that "though The Adventures of Lomax is not state-of-the-art, it is a genuinely fun ride."
