= Lemmings (video game) =

1991 video game

- Home computer cover art by Adrian Powell
- Developer: DMA Design: Sunsoft (SNES, SMD, TG16); Probe Software (GG, SMS); Psygnosis (CPC, 3DO, ZX); Ocean Software (NES); E&E Software (C64)
- Publisher: Psygnosis: Sunsoft (SNES, SMD, NES (NA)); Sega (GG, SMS); Atari Corporation (LYNX); Ocean Software (GB, NES (EU)); Philips Media (CD-i)
- Designer: David Jones
- Programmers: David Jones; Russell Kay; Mike Dailly
- Artists: Gary Timmons; Scott Johnston; Mike Dailly
- Composers: Tim Wright; Brian Johnston
- Series: Lemmings
- Platform: Amiga: MS-DOS, Mac OS, Atari ST, ZX Spectrum, CDTV, Acorn Archimedes, PC-98, FM Towns, X68000, Super NES, PC Engine, Mega Drive, Game Gear, Amstrad CPC, Master System, NES, Commodore 64, 3DO Interactive Multiplayer, Atari Lynx, SAM Coupé, Game Boy, CD-i, Amiga CD32, J2ME
- Release: 14 February 1991: Amiga; EU: 14 February 1991; NA: 1992 MS-DOS; NA: 1991 Mac OS; NA: 1991 Atari ST; EU: 1991 ZX Spectrum; EU: 1991 Archimedes; EU: 1991 PC-98; JP: 1991 CDTV; EU: 1992 FM Towns; JP: 1992 X68000; JP: 1992 PC Engine; NA: 1992; JP: 1992 Super NES; JP: December 1991; NA: March 1992; EU: August 1992 Master System; EU: November 26, 1992 Mega Drive/Genesis; NA: July 1992; JP: 20 November 1992; EU: December 10, 1992 Game Gear; NA: 1992; EU: November 26, 1992 CPC; EU: 1992 NES; NA: November 1992; EU: 19 May 1993 C64; EU: 1992; NA: 1993 3DO; NA: 1993 Lynx; NA: 1993 SAM Coupé; EU: 1993 Game Boy; EU: 1993; NA: August 1994 CD-i; EU: 1993; NA: 1995 CD32; EU: 1994 J2ME; NA: 2005
- Genres: Puzzle, strategy
- Modes: Single-player, multiplayer

Lemmings is a 1991 puzzle and strategy video game developed by DMA Design and published by Psygnosis for the Amiga. It was later ported to numerous other platforms. The game was programmed by Russell Kay, Mike Dailly and David Jones, and was inspired by a simple animation that Dailly created while experimenting with Deluxe Paint.

The objective of the game is to guide a group of anthropomorphised lemmings through a number of obstacles to a designated exit. In any given level, the player must save a specified number or percentage of the lemmings in order to advance. To this end, the player must decide how to assign limited quantities of eight different skills to individual lemmings, allowing them to alter the landscape and/or their own behaviour so that enough of the lemmings can reach the exit safely.

Lemmings was one of the best-received video games of the early 1990s. It was the second-highest-rated game in the history of Amstrad Action, and was considered the eighth-greatest game of all time by Next Generation in 1996. Lemmings is also one of the most widely ported video games, and is estimated to have sold around 20 million copies between its various ports. The popularity of the game also led to the creation of several other Lemmings games, remakes and spin-offs, and has also inspired similar games. However, Lemmings lost considerable popularity by the late 1990s, which was attributed in part to its slow pace of gameplay compared to games of later generations.

== Gameplay ==
Lemmings cross a bridge and tunnel through a rock formation in the Amiga version.

Lemmings is divided into a number of levels, grouped into four difficulty categories. Each level begins with one or more trap doors opening from above, releasing a steady line of lemmings who all follow each other. Levels include a variety of obstacles that prevent lemmings from reaching the exit, such as large drops, booby traps and pools of lava.

The goal of each level is to guide at least a portion of the green-haired, blue-robed lemmings from the entrance to the exit by clearing or creating a safe passage through the landscape for the lemmings to use. Unless assigned a special task, a lemming will walk in one direction ignoring any other lemming in its way (except Blockers), falling off any edges and turning around if it hits an obstacle it cannot pass. A lemming can die in a number of ways: falling from too great a height, drowning or falling into lava, falling off the bottom edge of the screen, being caught in a trap or fire, or being assigned the Bomber skill for five seconds. Every level has a time limit; if the timer expires, all the lemmings explode (even non-Bombers), the level ends, and the player is evaluated on the number of lemmings rescued.

To successfully complete the level, the player must assign specific skills to certain lemmings. Which skills and how many uses of each are available to the player varies from level to level, and the player must assign the skills carefully to successfully guide the lemmings. There are eight skills that can be assigned: Climbers climb vertically though fall down if they hit an overhang. Floaters use a parachute to fall safely from heights. Bombers explode after a five-second timer, destroying themselves and any destructible landscape in close proximity, though not damaging other lemmings or traps. Blockers stand still and prevent other lemmings from passing; lemmings that hit a Blocker simply reverse direction. Builders build a stairway of 12 steps, but will stop building when either it hits its head, runs out of bricks, or when the stairway hits a solid object. Bashers, Miners and Diggers tunnel horizontally, diagonally downwards or directly downwards respectively, but cannot break through steel barriers.

While the player is able to pause the game to inspect the level and status of the lemmings, skills can only be assigned in real-time. Lemmings are initially released at a rate predetermined by the level (from 1 to 99). The player can increase the rate as desired to a maximum of 99, and later decrease it down to, but not lower than, the initial rate. The player also has the option to "nuke" all the remaining lemmings on the screen, converting them to Bombers. This option can be used to abort a level when in a no-win situation, remove any Blockers that remain after the remaining lemmings have been rescued, or end a level quickly once the required percentage of saved lemmings has been reached.

The four difficulty groups – "Fun", "Tricky", "Taxing" and "Mayhem" – are used to organise the levels to reflect their overall difficulty. This rating reflects several factors, including the number of obstacles the player has to surpass, the limitation on the number of types of skills available to assign, the time limit, the minimum rate of lemming release, and the percentage of lemmings that must be saved. Some versions have additional difficulty ratings with more levels in each.

=== Two-player mode ===
In two-player mode, each player can only control lemmings of their own colour but attempt to guide any lemming to their own goal.

The original Lemmings also has 20 two-player levels. This took advantage of the Amiga's ability to support two mice simultaneously, and the Atari's ability to support a mouse and a joystick simultaneously. Each player is presented with their own view of the same map (on a vertically split screen), can only give orders to their own lemmings (green or blue), and has their own base. The goal is to get more lemmings (regardless of colour) into one's own base than the other player. Gameplay cycles through the 20 levels until neither player gets any lemmings home.

=== Oh No! More Lemmings ===
Oh No! More Lemmings is an expansion for the game. It contains 100 more single-player levels, and 10 more two-player levels.

== Development ==
Mike Dailly, the first employee of DMA Design and one of the programmers for Lemmings, provided a detailed history of the development of the game titled "The Lemmings Story" in 2006. David Jones, founder of DMA Design, has also commented on the development and success of Lemmings.

Gary Timmons changed Mike Dailly's lemming walking animation (left) to make it appear less stiff.

The inspiration for gameplay came as a result of a simple animated character sprite in an 8×8 pixel box created by Dailly using Deluxe Paint as part of development for Walker, then envisioned as a sequel to Blood Money. Dailly was able to quickly produce an animated graphic showing his creations moving endlessly, with additional graphical improvements made by Gary Timmons and other members of the DMA Design team to help remove the stiffness in the animation. One member, Russell Kay, observed that "There's a game in that!", and later coined the term "lemmings" for these creations, according to Dailly. Allowing the creatures to move across the landscape was based on a Salamander weapon concept for Blood Money and demonstrated with the animations.

Levels were designed based on a Deluxe Paint interface, which allowed several of the members to design levels, resulting in "hundreds of levels". There were several internal iterations of the levels, each designer challenging the others. Dailly pointed out that David Jones "used to try and beat us, and after proudly stabbing a finger at the screen and saying 'There! Beat that!', we'd calmly point out a totally new way of getting around all his traps, and doing it in a much simpler method. 'Oh...', he'd mutter, and scramble off to try and fix it." They also sent internally tested levels to Psygnosis, getting back the results of their testing via fax. While most were solved quickly, Dailly commented that "Every now and again though, the fax would be covered in scribbles with the time and comments crossed out again and again; this is what we were striving for while we were designing the levels, and it gave us all a warm fuzzy feeling inside."

Each of the designers had a somewhat different style in their levels: Dailly's levels often had titles containing clues to what to do (such as "It's hero time!", suggesting that one lemming had to be separated from the crowd) and generally required the player to perform several actions at once; Gary Timmons's levels were minimalistic, with popular culture references in the titles; and Scott Johnston's (whose mother was the first voice of the lemmings) levels were generally tightly packed. Dailly was also responsible for the "custom" levels based on other Psygnosis and Reflections Interactive Amiga games, including Shadow of the Beast, Menace, Awesome and Shadow of the Beast II. These "crossover" levels also used music from those games, though in ports these levels have been removed or altered to remove such references. After they developed most of the hard levels, they then created several simple levels either by copying the existing ones or creating new layouts; as Dailly states, "This I believe is where many games fall down today, they don't spend the time making a good learning curve." Timmons is credited with the official drawings of the lemmings, as necessitated by the need of Psygnosis for box cover artwork.

The two-player option was inspired by then-current games Populous and Stunt Car Racer. DMA Design initially wanted to use a null-modem connection between two machines to allow competitive play, but ended up using the ability of the Amiga to have two mouse pointer devices usable at the same time and thus created the split-screen mode.

== Music ==
Music was originally created by Brian Johnston (Scott's younger brother), who sampled bits of copyrighted music. This had been common practice, but at that point there was a growing awareness of music copyright. Psygnosis therefore asked Tim Wright to replace the offending tracks; he often used arrangements and reworkings of classical and traditional music to avoid copyright problems.

== Ports and expansions ==
The game's popularity on the Amiga led to its rapid porting to many other platforms, and it is regarded as one of the most widely ported video games. Within a year of its release, the game had been ported to the Atari ST, ZX Spectrum, IBM PC compatibles, and Super NES. David Jones stated that after porting the game to 20 systems, he stopped keeping count of additional ports. Other official ports were released for 3DO, Archimedes, Apple IIGS, Classic Mac OS, CDTV, Commodore 64, NES, Master System, Mega Drive, PC Engine, CD-i, and X68000.

The license to the Lemmings intellectual property had remained with Psygnosis, which became part of Sony Computer Entertainment in 1993 but ultimately folded in 2012, leaving Lemmings as a Sony property. Sony has used that to craft more modern remakes. In early 2006, Sony released a remake of Lemmings for the PlayStation Portable, developed by Team17. It features all 120 levels from the original game, 36 brand-new levels as well as DataPack support (similar to the Extra Track system featured in Wipeout Pure), and a user-level editor. Every level in the game is a pre-rendered 3D landscape, although their gameplay is still 2D and remains faithful to the original game. User levels can be constructed from pre-rendered objects and distributed by uploading them to a PlayStation-specific Lemmings online community. The soundtrack also marks the final video game score created by longtime composer Tim Follin after he announced his retirement from the industry in mid-2005. In October 2006 the game was ported by developer Rusty Nutz for the PlayStation 2 with use of the EyeToy. The basic change in the concept is that the player must stretch and use their limbs in the recorded picture to aid the lemmings.

Platform	Released	Developer	Publisher	Note
Atari ST	1991	DMA Design	Psygnosis	
MS-DOS	1991	DMA Design	Psygnosis	
ZX Spectrum	1991	DMA Design	Psygnosis	
PC-98	1991	BANDIT Inc.	Imagineer	
Classic Mac OS	1991	Presage Software	Psygnosis	
Super NES	1991	Sunsoft	Sunsoft	
Archimedes	1991	Krisalis Software	Krisalis Software	
Commodore 64	1992	E&E Software	Psygnosis	
CDTV	1992	DMA Design	Psygnosis	
FM Towns	1992	4000Do Inc.	Imagineer	
X68000	1992	BANDIT Inc.	Imagineer	
NES	1992	Ocean Software	Ocean Software^{EUR} Sunsoft^{NA}	
Game Gear	1992	Probe Software	Sega	
Master System	1992	Probe Software	Sega	
Amstrad CPC	1992	Walking Circles	Psygnosis	
Mega Drive	1992	Sunsoft	Sunsoft^{NA/JP} Sega^{EUR}	
PC Engine Super CD-ROM²	1992	Sunsoft	Sunsoft	
3DO	1993	DMA Design	Psygnosis^{NA} Electronic Arts Victor^{JP}	
Lynx	1993	DMA Design	Atari Corporation	
CD-i	1993	DMA Design	Philips	
SAM Coupé	1993	Chris White	Fred Publishing	
Game Boy	1993	Ocean Software	Ocean Software^{EUR/NA} Imagineer^{JP}	
CD32	1994	DMA Design	Psygnosis	Same as CDTV, as CDTV-version is CD32 compatible. Reissue only adds CD32 as format; disc content is the same.
Windows 95	1995	Visual Sciences	Activision^{NA} Dice Multi Media^{EUR} Imagineer^{JP}	Bundled with Oh No! More Lemmings
PlayStation	1998	Distinctive Developments	Psygnosis	Bundled with Oh No! More Lemmings
Game Boy Color	2000	J-Wing	J-Wing^{JP} Take-Two^{NA}	Bundled with Oh No! More Lemmings
J2ME	2005	iFone	iFone	

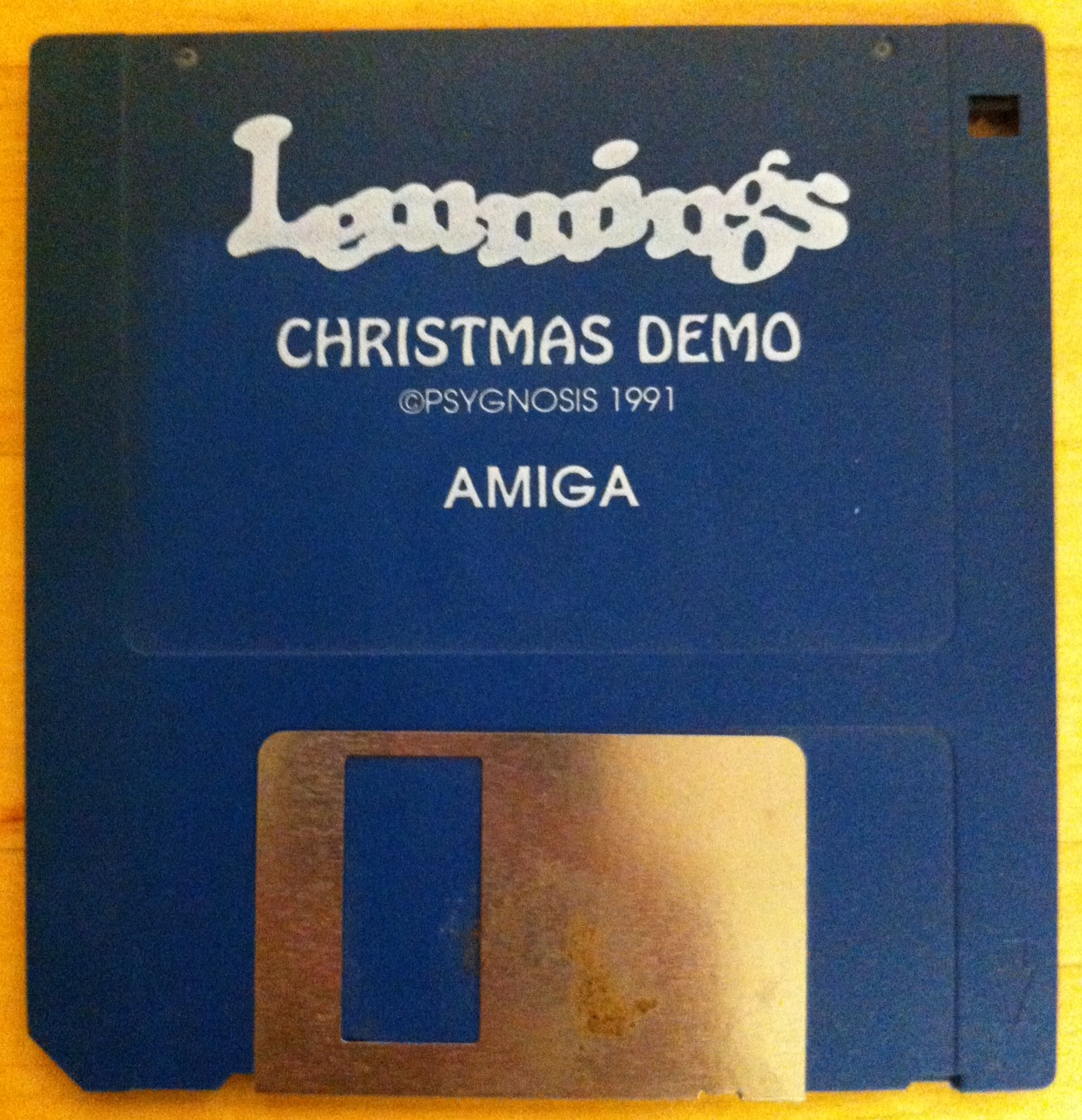
A floppy disk containing Christmas Lemmings (1991) for the Amiga

=== Expansions ===
Lemmings received some expansion packs following its launch. Oh No! More Lemmings, originally released for the Amiga in 1991 both as a data disk or standalone game, added five varying difficulties – 'Tame', 'Crazy', 'Wild', 'Wicked' and 'Havoc' – each with 20 new levels. The game also features enhanced graphics and altered sound effects. The expansion was also ported to Acorn Archimedes, Atari ST, DOS, Macintosh, and SAM Coupé, and the levels were made available with the Game Boy Color, Microsoft Windows, PlayStation and Sega Mega Drive (some ported) versions of Lemmings. Oh No! More Lemmings received generally positive reviews. Dan Slingsby of CU Amiga found the game addictive, calling the puzzles "ingenious", and Peter Lee of Amiga Action praised the quality and difficulty of the levels; Stuart Campbell of Amiga Power was disappointed by the lack of fixes from the original game, and Ed Ricketts of ST Format criticized the difficulty gradient of the levels and the price of the expansion, but both ultimately gave positive reviews nonetheless.

Christmas Lemmings, also known as Holiday Lemmings, was also released as a series of short games released between 1991 and 1994. The gameplay remains unchanged from the base game, which is not required. First released as Xmas Lemmings as two four-level demos in 1991 and 1992, there were two later full retail releases on the Amiga and Atari ST in 1993 and 1994, both with an additional 32 levels. The games were well-received; Rob Mead of Amiga Format described it as "funny, frustrating and incredibly addictive", despite being disappointed by the number of levels, and Will Greenwald of PC Magazine ranked it among the best Christmas video games in 2014.

== Reception ==
Reception

Aggregate score
Aggregator	Score
GameRankings	SNES: 83%

Review scores
Publication	Score
AllGame	2.5/5 (NES); 4/5 (GG); 4.5/5 (SNES)
Amstrad Action	Amstrad: 97%
Crash	Spectrum: 91%
Computer and Video Games	Master System: 92%
Electronic Gaming Monthly	Lynx: 6.8/10; CD-i: 6.25/10; Game Gear: 5/10, 7/10, 6/10, 7/10; SNES: 7/10, 8/10, 6/10, 8/10
Famitsu	Super Famicom: 9/10, 9/10, 8/10, 9/10
IGN	Lynx: 9/10
Mean Machines	SNES: 92%
Next Generation	3DO: 4/5
Your Sinclair	Spectrum: 91%
Zzap!64	97%
MegaTech	Mega Drive: 92%
Mega	Mega Drive: 90%
Commodore Force	C64: 97%
Mikrobitti	Amiga: 84%
PC-pelit	DOS: 84%

Awards
Publication	Award
Amstrad Action	2nd-best rated game in the history of the magazine
Amiga Power	2nd-best Amiga game of all time (1991)
Mega	23rd-best game of all time (1994)
CGW	12th-best game of all time (1996)
Edge	82nd-top game of all time (2007)
Your Sinclair	20th-top ZX Spectrum game of all time (1993, by readers)
Wirtualna Polska	The best Amiga game of all time (2011)
Next Generation	8th-top game of all time (1996)

The original sales for Lemmings on the Amiga topped 55,000 copies on the first day of sales; in comparison, Menace sold 20,000 copies and Blood Money sold 40,000 copies cumulatively. With all ports included, Mike Dailly estimated that 15 million copies of Lemmings were sold between 1991 and 2006. In 2011, Luke Plunkett from Kotaku placed the figure at over 20 million, a figure which has been quoted as far back as 1997.

At the time of its first release, Lemmings received several high scores from gaming magazines, with only the level of graphics and sound receiving some small amount of criticism. David Sears of Compute!, in his review of Lemmings for the PC, stated that "perhaps Psygnosis has tapped into the human instinct for survival in formulating this perfect blend of puzzle, strategy, and action." Amiga Computing stated that "Lemmings is absolutely brilliant. Psygnosis have managed to produce a game that is not only totally original, but also features the kind of addictive gameplay that will keep you coming back for more time and time again." A review from the Australian Commodore and Amiga Review (ACAR) stated that "above all, the concept is simple, and the game is a lot of fun." Computer Gaming World stated that "Not since Tetris has this reviewer been so addicted to, or completely fascinated with, a series of challenging puzzles ... follow the crowd and get Lemmings". In 1992 the magazine named it its Action Game of the Year. The game was reviewed in 1991 in Dragon by Hartley, Patricia, and Kirk Lesser in "The Role of Computers" column. The reviewers gave the game 5 out of 5 stars. The Lessers reviewed the Macintosh version of the game in 1993 in Dragon, also giving that version 5 stars.

In the Finnish magazine Mikrobitti, Jukka Tapanimäki gave the Amiga and DOS versions of Lemmings 84 points of 100. He praised the game's originality but expressed criticism for it being repetitive.

In 1994, Electronic Gaming Monthly complimented the Lynx version's large number of options and password feature, and remarked, "Lemmings has always been a good strategy game, and the Lynx version continues the tradition." The following year they reviewed the CD-i version, criticising that it has nothing but the obligatory full-motion video intro to set it apart from the numerous ports of the game that had already been released over the past four years. GamePro made the same criticisms, commenting that "this former 16-bit puzzler isn't going anywhere new on the CD-i."

Next Generation's review of the 3DO version assessed that "If you've played any version, you've played this one, too, but if you haven't tried it, this is one of the better ones, and it's still one game that's addictive as hell."

In 1996, Computer Gaming World declared Lemmings the 12th-best computer game ever released, and that same year, Next Generation declared it the 8th-greatest game of all time, and "second only to Tetris" in the puzzle genre. In 2004, readers of Retro Gamer voted Lemmings as the 21st-top retro game, with the editors calling it "perhaps Psygnosis' finest hour and a turning point in the puzzle genre." In 1991, PC Format named Lemmings one of the 50 best computer games ever. The editors wrote, "Yes, we know it sounds stupid, but you will like it – everyone else has." In 1994, PC Gamer US named Lemmings the 30th-best computer game ever. The editors called it "one of the biggest puzzlers ever released for PC" and "cleaner and less complicated" than its sequel. That same year, PC Gamer UK named it the 25th-best computer game of all time, calling it "a seminal title."

In 1998, PC Gamer declared it the 21st-best computer game ever released, and the editors called it "as fresh and addictive today as it was when it was first released". In 2018, Complex listed the game 70th on its "The Best Super Nintendo Games of All Time". In 1995, Total! ranked the game 81st on their Top 100 SNES Games summarizing: "The game that spawned a dozen imitators is still one of the best platform puzzlers available."

== Legacy ==
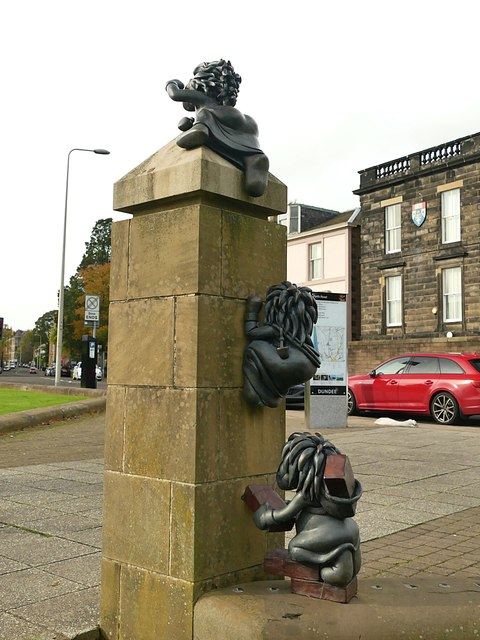
Three bronze lemming statues by Alyson Conway were installed at Seabraes, near DMA Design's original Dundee offices, in July 2013.

Lemmings inspired several further games in the franchise, including the Christmas Lemmings short games that were released between 1991 and 1994, and the 1991 expansion Oh No! More Lemmings. Stand-alone sequels were Lemmings 2: The Tribes (1993), All New World of Lemmings (1994), 3D Lemmings (1995) and Lemmings Revolution (2000). By mid-1995, Lemmings and its sequels had accumulated combined sales of more than 4 million units worldwide. Two spin-off games were also made, both in 1996; Lemmings Paintball and The Adventures of Lomax.

The intellectual property (IP) of Lemmings stayed with the initial publisher Psygnosis, who were acquired by Sony Computer Entertainment in 1993. Sony gained the IP for Lemmings from this acquisition; in 2006 a new game also titled Lemmings was released for PlayStation consoles. The next game in the franchise, Lemmings Touch, was developed by D3T and released in 2014 for PlayStation Vita. Sony eventually licensed the rights to Exient Entertainment, who published a mobile game Lemmings: The Puzzle Adventure in 2018. Exient produced a 30th anniversary documentary of the history of Lemmings, released in February 2022.

Numerous clones of Lemmings were made, including The Humans (1992) and Pingus (1998). Other similar games include Clones (2009), which was described by the developed as "a multiplayer version of Lemmings". Yannick LeJacq of Kotaku, commenting on the 2014 game MouseCraft which incorporates elements of Lemmings and Tetris, speculated that games like Lemmings would not be very successful in the current gaming market, as the pace of the game is far too slow to satisfy most players.

In 2004, Graham Cormode proved that deciding whether it is possible to complete a level of Lemmings is NP-hard. Later, Giovanni Viglietta showed that the task is PSPACE-complete, even for levels where there is only one lemming to save.

In 2010, it was announced that Lemmings would be ported to the iOS operating system by developer Mobile 1UP, though Sony Computer Entertainment Europe later presented them with a cease-and-desist letter, forcing them to halt development of the port. Mobile 1UP reworked the game to replace the Lemmings with humans in a prehistoric setting, and instead released the game under the name Caveman in 2011. Brutal Deluxe, the developer who did the porting of the Apple IIGS version of Lemmings, has released the port's source code.

Lemmings has also been called a predecessor of the modern real-time strategy (RTS) video game genre. A 1991 Amiga Power article claimed that Lemmings "was the first major game to introduce the 'indirect-control' concept," an element that is now common in many RTS games. Blizzard Entertainment developer Bob Fitch said that part of the inspiration for the first Warcraft game, Warcraft: Orcs & Humans, was based on developing a competitive multiplayer RTS that combined elements of The Lost Vikings (which he had worked on) and Lemmings; Fitch said "We just went, 'Oh it's so cool when you see lots of Lemmings all over the place. Why don't we have lots of Vikings all over instead, and then the Vikings can fight each other'." Lemmings' introduction of RTS elements has been noted by fantasy author Terry Pratchett; in his novel Interesting Times, an army of golems is controlled in a fashion reminiscent of the Lemmings user interface. When readers asked if this was deliberate, Pratchett responded: "Merely because the red army can fight, dig, march and climb and is controlled by little icons? Can't imagine how anyone thought that... Not only did I wipe Lemmings from my hard disk, I overwrote it so I couldn't get it back."

Lemmings was one of six games featured in a stamp series issued by the Royal Mail in 2020 to pay tribute to the United Kingdom's early video game industry.
