= Frankenstein (2007 film) =

- Based on: Frankenstein by Mary Shelley
- Written by: Jed Mercurio
- Directed by: Jed Mercurio
- Starring: Helen McCrory; James Purefoy; Lindsay Duncan; Neil Pearson
- Country of origin: United Kingdom
- Original language: English

Production
- Producer: Hugh Warren
- Running time: 75 minutes (broadcast version); 90 minutes (director's cut)

Original release
- Network: ITV
- Release: 24 October 2007

Frankenstein is a 2007 British television film produced by Impossible Pictures for ITV. It was written and directed by Jed Mercurio, adapted from Mary Shelley's 1818 novel Frankenstein; or, The Modern Prometheus to a present-day setting. The film was broadcast on 24 October 2007, to an average audience of 3.6 million.

== Premise ==
Dr. Victoria Frankenstein, a geneticist, creates a monster by mistake while growing her son's clone from stem cells as an organ donor in an effort to prevent his imminent death.

== Plot ==
Dr. Victoria Frankenstein, a scientist experimenting on stem cells and biotechnology, is working to advance medical science so her eight-year-old child, William, has a chance to receive organ transplants, and possibly a cure. This is the Universal Xenograft Project, overseen by Professor Andrew Waldman and assisted by her friend, Ed Gore. In the process of an organ-growing experiment, Victoria inserts William's blood into the procedure, and the stem cells begin to grow at a rapid rate. The insertion of William's blood is unknown until Ed discovers a tooth within the purpose-built tank in which the stem cells are cultivating, and Andrew is then alerted. X-rays within the tank show that an organism is growing, and for the intention of scientific advancement, it is allowed to live. However, a lightning strike cuts the power within the building, and the creature, referred to as "the UX", escapes.

He wanders the sewers and is seen by a small girl when he is close to the exit of the pipes. The UX later kills the girl when she starts screaming. The UX soon returns to the laboratory, however, and kills a security guard. The UX is captured by security personnel, and taken to a different laboratory, in which Victoria's husband Henry is seemingly in authority. Victoria attempts to interact with and calm the UX, but is mostly unsuccessful. In one of these tests, the UX acts similar to William, which convinces Victoria that it really is William. At night, Victoria attempts to free the UX but initially fails, until Henry arrives by helicopter, and they escape to a nearby beach to consider their position. Soon, a team of armed men arrive and request that they hand over the UX. Henry refuses, and is swiftly shot. The armed men then take Victoria and the UX. In the final scene, Victoria is seemingly trying to educate the UX in an unknown facility, where they are being watched by their captors wondering whether it will love or hate Victoria for creating it.

== Cast ==
- Helen McCrory as Victoria Frankenstein: A scientist in the fields of biotechnology, Victoria is a member of the Universal Xenograft Project, which aims to advance medical science with use of stem cells. She was also married to Henry Clerval, but he "walked out on [them]", and has since divorced her. Her son, William, is terminally ill, motivating her to create the UX as a future organ donor.
- James Purefoy as Henry Clerval: Henry seems to be a figure of authority or a supervisor at a secret lab, where the UX has been moved. People around Henry have believed him to be a doctor, including his wife Victoria. He "walked out" on Victoria and his son William, but has been more involved with them now that William has become ill. He is killed by a squad of armed men after he escapes with Victoria and the UX.
- Neil Pearson as Andrew Waldman: Victoria's colleague and friend. The two work together in the lab. He's killed by the UX when it returns to the Laboratory.
- Lindsay Duncan as Professor Jane Pretorius: Victoria's boss, who finds out about the project but refuses to terminate it. When the monster is unleashed and later captured, it is revealed that Jane has been working with Henry. She wants to use the UX to help humans, and suggests that creatures like the UX would make good soldiers. Her men kidnap Victoria and the UX at the end of the film. She is based on Doctor Septimus Pretorius from Bride of Frankenstein.
- Benedict Wong as Ed Gore: Victoria's assistant who helps her (unintentionally at first) create the UX. He is killed by the UX when it returns to laboratory after escaping. His name is a parody of Igor.
- Julian Bleach as The Monster: The creature Victoria creates, called the UX project. He has Victoria's dead son's DNA in him due to Victoria adding her son's blood into the capsule it was being made in. He escapes due to a power cut and goes on a small killing spree. However Victoria comes to love it. She tries to show it love and appears to succeed. The UX and Victoria are taken by Jane's men to an unknown facility, where Victoria attempts to educate it. It is left up to the viewer if the creature will love or hate Victoria as it matures.
- Anna Torv as ITU Nurse
- Michael Wildman as Connolly
- Fraser James as Joe
- Cally Hamilton as Little girl
- Bruce Johnson as American Intelligence Agent
- Richard Betts as Vicar

== Reception ==
Serena Davies of The Daily Telegraph called the film "chilling and surprisingly poignant."
