= Oh No! More Lemmings =

1991 video game expansion pack

- Amiga box cover
- Developer: DMA Design (Note: Ported to Mac OS by Presage Software)
- Publisher: Psygnosis
- Series: Lemmings
- Platform: Amiga
- Release: December 1991
- Genre: Puzzle
- Modes: Single-player, multiplayer

Oh No! More Lemmings is an expansion pack for the puzzle video game Lemmings by DMA Design. It contains 100 single-player levels and six music tracks. The Amiga version also includes 10 two-player levels. The game requires either the install disk from the previous Lemmings, or, in a standalone version, the game manual, for use as a copy protector. The new levels are separated into five difficulty categories (Tame, Crazy, Wild, Wicked, and Havoc), each with 20 levels.

The expansion received positive reviews for the uniqueness and the puzzles. Some reviewers, however, criticized it for the lack of fixes from the original title as well as the difficulty. The expansion was ported to many home computers and consoles.

== Gameplay ==
The gameplay is effectively identical to the original Lemmings game. However, while the first few levels for the Fun rating in the original game are tutorial-like, the Tame levels in Oh No! More Lemmings are just simple levels that make experienced Lemmings players familiar with the new terrain styles and no hints. All subsequent levels are considerably more difficult than those from the original game and become tougher at a much greater rate. Some players consider the Oh No! levels to be more entertaining, as they present a much greater challenge than those of the first game. The quota for the skills on many levels is set so that all quotas must be used to complete the level, thus giving only one possible way to complete many levels in Oh No! More Lemmings.

Unlike the original game, none of the levels borrowed graphics from other Psygnosis titles. In one level, "Inroducing SUPERLEMMING" [sic], the player must save a single lemming that moves at a greatly increased speed. Also unlike the original Lemmings, each level is unique; no levels appear in multiple difficulty categories with different amounts of each skill.

== Development ==
Oh No! More Lemmings, originally released for the Amiga in 1991 both as a data disk or standalone game, added five varying difficulties—Tame, Crazy, Wild, Wicked and Havoc—each with 20 new levels. The game also features enhanced graphics and altered sound effects. The expansion was also ported to Acorn Archimedes, Atari ST, DOS, Macintosh, and SAM Coupé, and the levels were made available with the Game Boy Color, Microsoft Windows, PlayStation and Sega Mega Drive versions of Lemmings.

== Ports ==
SAM Coupé screenshot

The game was ported to MS-DOS, Atari ST, SAM Coupé, Macintosh and Acorn Archimedes either as data disk or standalone game. The levels were also made available for Microsoft Windows, Game Boy Color, and PlayStation, included with their versions of Lemmings. The Sega Genesis version of Lemmings includes some of the Oh No! More Lemmings levels, but they were redesigned using the original game's graphics and were given different names.

== Reception ==
Oh No! More Lemmings received generally positive reviews. Dan Slingsby of CU Amiga found the game addictive, calling the puzzles "ingenious", and Peter Lee of Amiga Action praised the quality and difficulty of the levels; Stuart Campbell of Amiga Power was disappointed by the lack of fixes from the original game, and Ed Ricketts of ST Format criticised the difficulty gradient of the levels and the price of the expansion, but both ultimately gave positive reviews nonetheless.

John Sweeney for Page 6 said "Some of the new puzzles are superb and will have you scratching your head for some time as you check out all the possible routes and find more of them are red herrings." Ciarán Brennan for The One said "It may be more of the same, there may be a lack of consistency in the toughness of the levels, it may even be outrageously expensive [...] but this is just as compulsive and frustrating as the original – great stuff." MegaZone said "These atrocious designs, coupled with the vats of acid, perilous pits of water and strange mechanical monstrosities make the original Lemmings look decidedly tame." Jeff James for Amazing Computing Amiga said "Quibbles aside, ONML is a must buy if you're a Lemmings fan." Tom Malcom for Info said "if you're a Lemmings fan, Oh No! is an absolute requirement for your collection."
