= Lemmings Paintball =

1996 video game

- Cover art
- Developer: Visual Sciences
- Publisher: Psygnosis
- Series: Lemmings
- Platform: Microsoft Windows
- Release: June 1996
- Genre: Action
- Modes: Single-player, multiplayer

Lemmings Paintball is an action video game from the Lemmings franchise made by Visual Sciences and published by Psygnosis in 1996.

Lemmings Paintball was known as Lemmings Play Paintball during development.

== Gameplay ==
Unlike most of the Lemmings games, Paintball is not a side-scrolling puzzle game where lemmings are constantly on the move and need giving commands to control; instead, the gameplay is an isometric tactical shooter where lemmings are controlled directly and do not move unless told to. While the main objective is still to get to an exit in the level (this time marked by a flag), the core of the gameplay consists of splattering enemy lemmings with a paintball gun. Levels may involve up to four player-controlled lemmings; if there are four flags on the level, all four lemmings must survive to reach a flag each. The levels contain various puzzles including moving platforms, lemming catapults, trampolines, and switches and keys that open gates; ammo is limited and can be restocked by picking up paint blobs.

== Reception ==
Reception

Review scores
Publication	Score
GameSpot	5.6/10
Next Generation	3/5

A Next Generation critic commented, "Like most Lemmings games, the sound and graphics are cute and simple, but not stunning, and gameplay is entertaining. The biggest problem is ... when dealing with squares on the other side of raised areas, there's no way to tell if it's dangerous or safe, except by sacrificing a lemming to find out." GameSpot reviewer Tim Soete praised the game's strategy, networked multiplayer, soundtrack, inclusion of two older Lemmings games as a bonus, graphics, and challenge, while criticizing the frustratingly difficult terrain. GameRanking's scores list it as 63%, based upon three reviews.
