= Cloning (disambiguation) =

Cloning is the process of making an identical copy of something.

Cloning may also refer to:

- Cloning (programming), the copying of a programming object
- Disk cloning, the copying of the contents of a computer hard disk to a storage medium or file
- Molecular cloning, the process of identifying and isolating a specific gene
- Phone cloning, the transfer of identity between one mobile telephone and another
- Reduplication, a.k.a. "cloning", in linguistics refers to a process by which the root or stem of a word is repeated
- "The Cloning", an episode of the Adult Swim animated television series, Aqua Teen Hunger Force

== See also ==
- Clone (disambiguation)
