= Clonal =

Clonal may refer to:

== Biology ==
- Clonal interference, a phenomenon that occurs when two (or more) beneficial mutations arise independently in different individuals in a genetically homogeneous population of an asexually reproducing organism
- Aggregating anemone, also called clonal anemone
- Vegetative cloning, a form of asexual reproduction in plants
- Clonal reproduction

== Immunology ==
- Clonal deletion, a process by which B cells and T cells are deactivated before act significantly upon specific antigens
- Clonal selection theory, a model for how the immune system responds to infection
- Clonal anergy, a lack of reaction by the body's defense mechanisms to foreign substance

== Chemistry ==
- Clonal, a chemical molecule sold under that name as a fragrance ingredient

== See also ==
- Clone (disambiguation)
- Clonalis House
- Clone (genetics)
- Cloning
