= Lemmings (series) =

- Genre: Puzzle
- Developers: DMA Design (1991–1994); Clockwork Games (1995); Visual Sciences (1995-1996); Psygnosis (1996–2000); Team17 (2006); Glu Mobile (2008); D3T (2012–2014); Exient (2018-2025)
- Publishers: Psygnosis (1991–1996); Take-Two Interactive (2000); Sony Interactive Entertainment (2006–2014); Glu Mobile (2008); Exient (2018–2025)
- Platforms: Amiga, MS-DOS, Mac OS, Atari ST, ZX Spectrum, CDTV, Acorn Archimedes, PC-98, FM Towns, X68000, Super Nintendo Entertainment System, PC Engine, Mega Drive, Game Gear, Amstrad CPC, Master System, Nintendo Entertainment System, Commodore 64, 3DO Interactive Multiplayer, Atari Lynx, SAM Coupé, Game Boy, CD-i, Amiga CD32, J2ME, PlayStation, Sega Saturn, Microsoft Windows, PlayStation Portable, PlayStation 2, PlayStation 3, PlayStation Vita, iOS, Android
- First release: Lemmings; 14 February 1991
- Latest release: Lemmings: The Puzzle Adventure; 20 December 2018

Lemmings is a series of video games originally created by DMA Design and Psygnosis. DMA Design developed the first installment of the series, Lemmings, which was published by Psygnosis for the Amiga on 14 February 1991, to wide commercial success and critical acclaim. Several sequels to the game were created by various developers in collaboration with Psygnosis, and later Sony Interactive Entertainment after the former was folded into the latter.

The Lemmings series primarily consists of puzzle video games centered around characters named "Lemmings"; the Lemmings continuously walk straight forward, and are meant to be led to an exit by the player by being given abilities. Beyond this, each installment features variations to the gameplay style and mechanics. The series has few spin-off titles; some of these encompass other game genres.

== Gameplay ==
The Lemmings series primarily consists of puzzle video games. The games feature characters named Lemmings, who are anthropomorphic lemmings with green hair and blue robes. The objective in these games is to guide a portion of the titular characters across assorted landscapes to reach an exit.

The player does not have direct control over the Lemmings; instead, the player controls a cursor that is used to assign skills to the Lemmings. Each Lemming starts out walking forward in one direction continuously until it runs into a wall (in which case it turns around) or is assigned a skill. Some skills cause Lemmings to change their behavior; for instance, Lemmings given the Blocker skill will stop moving entirely.

In most games of the series, each level gives the player a certain quantity of each skill, limiting how many Lemmings can be tasked with a particular skill. Each level also has a certain number of Lemmings, requiring a specific portion of them to be led to the exit in order for the player to be allowed to progress.

== History ==
The first installment of the Lemmings series, titled Lemmings, was developed by DMA Design and published by Psygnosis, having been launched for the Amiga on 14 February 1991. It quickly became commercially successful, with multiple ports being created in the following years. Lemmings became one of the best-selling and most well-received video games of its time.

Psygnosis was acquired by Sony Electronic Publishing in 1993, becoming a wholly owned subsidiary. Subsequent games in the series continued to be published by Psygnosis to competing platforms, however. Psygnosis (later renamed Studio Liverpool) was closed in 2012. The Lemmings IP is currently owned by Sony.

Sony licensed the Lemmings IP to Exient, who developed and published the game Lemmings: The Puzzle Adventure.

== Games ==
Release timeline
1991	Lemmings
1992
1993	Lemmings 2: The Tribes
1994	All New World of Lemmings
1995	3D Lemmings
1996	Lemmings Paintball
1996	The Adventures of Lomax
1997
1998
1999
2000	Lemmings Revolution
2001
2002
2003
2004
2005	Love a Lemming
2006	Lemmings (2006 remake)
2006	Lemmings (PS3)
2007
2008	Lemmings Tribes
2009
2010
2011
2012
2013
2014	Lemmings Touch
2015
2016
2017
2018	Lemmings: The Puzzle Adventure (2018)

=== Main series ===
==== Lemmings (1991) ====
Lemmings is the first entry of the Lemmings series, originally published for the Amiga on 14 February 1991. Since then, it was developed and released for several other platforms.

Lemmings established the series' gameplay formula, with each level giving the player a quantity of each of eight skills: Climber, Floater, Bomber, Blocker, Builder, Basher, Digger and Miner. The player must use these skills to allow the Lemmings to navigate to the exit.

An expansion pack for Lemmings, Oh No! More Lemmings, was released in December 1991. Some later ports of Lemmings included the content from Oh No! More Lemmings, such as the PlayStation version.

==== Lemmings 2: The Tribes ====
Lemmings 2: The Tribes is the second main entry of the series, originally released on 26 February 1993 for the Amiga, MS-DOS and Atari ST platforms.

Lemmings 2: The Tribes introduces a story to the series: the Lemmings have divided into twelve groups named the Tribes. Each Tribe occupies a portion of the world map, with each portion representing a set of ten themed levels available to play. The game introduces numerous additional skills, giving a total of 50 skills.

==== All New World of Lemmings ====
All New World of Lemmings (named The Lemmings Chronicles in North America) is the third main entry of the series, originally released on 25 November 1994 for the Amiga and MS-DOS platforms.

All New World of Lemmings continues the story established by Lemmings 2: The Tribes, but focuses on only three Tribes. Unlike in previous games, skills such as building, floating, digging and swimming are consolidated into a single control, available when a Lemming picks up a corresponding item.

==== 3D Lemmings ====
3D Lemmings is the first game of the series to not involve DMA Design, being developed instead by Clockwork Games and published by Psygnosis. It was released for the PlayStation, Sega Saturn and MS-DOS platforms.

3D Lemmings adapts the gameplay of the series to take place in three-dimensional world layouts. The game features nine skills, with eight of these being analogous to the skills featured in the original game and one being new to the series: the Turner, which turns Lemmings 90 degrees clockwise or anti-clockwise.

==== Lemmings Revolution ====
Lemmings Revolution was developed by Psygnosis Leeds and published by Take-Two Interactive. It was released exclusively for Microsoft Windows in May 2000.

Lemmings Revolution reverts to a two-dimensional layout for levels, but preserves a 3D visual style, having levels take place along the surface of a cylinder that can be rotated to see each portion of a level. The game is based on the same eight skills featured in the original game and features 100 levels.

==== Lemmings (2006 remake) ====
Lemmings received a remake bearing the same name, developed by Team17 and published in 2006. The remake features all 120 levels from the original game, as well as 36 new levels and a tool for users to create their own levels. It features improved graphics and a new soundtrack.

A port of this remake was released for devices compatible with the PlayStation Mobile framework in December 2012, including certified smartphones, tablets and the PlayStation Vita handheld console.

==== Lemmings (2006 PS3 game) ====
After releasing the Lemmings remake for the PSP, Team17 produced a sequel, bearing the same name, for the PlayStation 3 for download through PlayStation Network. The game features 40 levels, and its gameplay is based on the same eight skills featured in the original game. It has similar graphical improvements to those of the PSP remake, as well as online scoreboards and artwork developed for a high-definition display, but cannot be used to create and share levels as the PSP title can.

==== Lemmings Tribes ====
Lemmings Tribes was developed and published in 2008 for Java-enabled handsets by Glu Mobile, who had previously acquired iFone, a video game developer who had previously obtained license from Psygnosis to use the Lemmings property. The game features three of the Tribes from previous Lemmings games, with these including the Space tribe, the Medieval tribe, and Classic Lemmings.

==== Lemmings Touch ====
Lemmings Touch was released for PlayStation Vita on 27 May 2014, developed by D3T. It features controls designed to utilize the touchscreen, as well as fully 3D-rendered Lemmings, for whom a set of costumes can be unlocked.

Some of the game's new levels feature Mischievous Lemmings, who behave like regular Lemmings but cause the level to fail if they reach the exit. The game also incorporates side objectives that reward the player with an in-game currency, which is used to access the aforementioned costume items. Each level also has a star rating, which gauges the player's performance and determines when more levels are unlocked. Trophies are also available to be earned by completing specified tasks in the game.

==== Lemmings: The Puzzle Adventure ====
Lemmings: The Puzzle Adventure is an iteration of the series released by Exient studio Sad Puppy for iOS and Android in December 2018 under the title Lemmings. This iteration of the series is designed in portrait mode and is controlled via the touchscreen. The game uses a free-to-play model, incorporating an "energy" system wherein the skills cost energy to use but are otherwise unlimited in use, and includes in-app purchases. The game features the Tribes as sets of collectible characters that are consistently released over time.

In updates, the game was renamed Lemmings: The Puzzle Adventure and received additional features; examples include an experience system, seasonal updates, and sets of new levels. In 2024, an update was released which implemented a feature, named the Creatorverse, that allows users to create and share levels.

=== Spin-offs ===
==== Holiday Lemmings ====
Holiday Lemmings is a series of spin-off Lemmings games released from 1991 to 1994. These games share similar gameplay to the original game, but include levels with designs themed around the holiday season. The first two installments, released in 1991 and 1992 respectively, were four-level demo games, while the latter two installments were full retail releases with a larger number of levels.

==== Lemmings Paintball ====
Lemmings Paintball is an action video game developed by Visual Science and published by Psygnosis in June 1996.

Lemmings Paintball has the player control one to four Lemmings armed with paintball guns, which can be used to shoot enemies. The goal is to lead these Lemmings to all the flags present in the level. Lemmings Paintball portrays levels over a three-quarters perspective. The game has 100 levels and also features a network mode.

==== The Adventures of Lomax ====
The Adventures of Lomax (named Lomax in Europe) is a side-scrolling platform video game developed and published by Psygnosis for PlayStation and Microsoft Windows. It was initially released in North America on 22 October 1996.

Lomax is centered around the character of Lomax, a Lemming who is tasked with saving the other Lemmings from being transformed into monsters by the villainous Evil Ed.

==== Love a Lemming ====
Love a Lemming is a virtual pet simulation video game developed and published by iFone in November 2005 for Java-enabled handsets. In it, the player must care for a Lemming and train its skills by playing six mini-games, with the goal of eventually releasing it into the wild. Once it is released, the Lemming can be accepted into one of six of the Tribes, and the player is given a unique code which was intended to be used in a future game in the Lemmings series.
