= Clones (video game) =

2010 video game

- Developer: Tomkorp
- Platform: Microsoft Windows
- Release: November 18, 2010
- Genre: Puzzle
- Modes: Single-player, multiplayer

Clones is a puzzle real-time strategy by Canadian developer Tomkorp for Microsoft Windows, released on November 18, 2010 through Steam. Clones was created by independent game developer Tomkorp Computer Solutions as their first game. It features alien creatures named clones to which the player can assign a variety of morph commands which cause the clones to deform their body in order to navigate the terrain. Multiple game types are supported as well as both single player and multiplayer modes.

== Gameplay ==
The core gameplay of Clones is similar to Lemmings but includes several differences such as multiple game modes, networked multiplayer, a world ranking system, simple A.I., and a built-in level editor. Primarily a 2D game, Clones uses a 3D camera to display the Clones planet (single-player world map) and to allow zooming and rotation of the 2D landscape. The player cannot control the clones directly, except for the mutated light clone, and must issue morphs to the clones which deform their bodies and allow them to perform 10 different actions to help navigate the landscape.

=== Game modes ===
The clones are grouped into 8 different color groups with identical functionality. In single player the user controls only one group with the rest being computer controlled (or not available), while in multiplayer every player may control a different group. The objective for each level depends on the current game mode which can be one of the following:

- Corral the Clone - The group which beams up (saves) the most clones win.
- Capture the Clone - Each group tries to lure a large clone to an exit area.
- Procure the Particle - Each group must direct their clones to pick up a particle and then lead the particle-carrying clone to the particle receptacle.
- Multiverse Match - Every group has their own sealed duplicate level and must race to complete the puzzle in the shortest time.
- Quantum Quarrel - Each group tries to atomize clones of other groups. The last clone group standing wins.
- Super Synergy (multiplayer only) - Co-operative multiplayer. Multiple players can solve puzzles as a team.
- Quantum Loop (single player only) - A level with N groups is played N times and on each iteration the player controls the Nth group and must co-ordinate the morphs given in the past with the currently controlled group.

Each game mode may have a number of options to vary the gameplay such as allowing a single saboteur clone in the Multiverse Match mode.

=== Multiplayer ===
The multiplayer experience takes place in the setting of the intergalactic Clone Master League. Players can host a tournament or view a list of all active tournaments in the universe and join one. Multiplayer matches offer a high degree of replay value and can be much more intense than single player as a result of humans being so unpredictable. Players have the option of registering a one-on-one match with the Clone Stats world ranking system which uses a chess-like method for determining a player's rank. This mode is similar to Multiplayer Lemmings from the SNES version of Lemmings, but playable over the internet or LAN.

=== Level editor ===
Clones comes with a built-in, fully featured WYSIWYG level editor which will allow players to create their own multiplayer levels as well as Clone Master packs to extend the number of single player puzzles. The editor uses object primitives to build up a level from many small pieces. Objects can be freely rotated, scaled, tinted, and alpha-blended to produce levels with a high level of appeal. Levels can be compressed into level packs and then uploaded to the ClonesGame.com website to share with other players.

== Plot ==
The single-player campaign places the player in the role of a new Clone Master, visiting the Clones Planet who is to progress on a pilgrimage to visit and learn from 10 Elder Clone Masters. Each defeated Elder gives the player a segment of a medallion which once restored will unlock a final Elder Clone Master. Each Clone Master will present the player with 10-20 puzzles with the final puzzle being a head-to-head battle against the Elder in Multiverse Match mode. Players are encouraged to learn as much as possible from the Elders before engaging in online play, which can be very challenging.

== Development ==
Clones was developed by Tomkorp Computer Solutions Inc. which is a two-man company from Winnipeg, Manitoba, Canada that specializes in building customized multi-user database applications. Clones is their first released game. Financial support was provided by Telefilm Canada, STEM, and Fortune Cat Games Studio Incubator.

=== Funding ===
Funding for the Fortune Cat Video Games incubator comes from Component IV of the Winnipeg Partnership Agreement by Western Economic Diversification Canada. This component is designed to strengthen Winnipeg's innovation system by supporting projects that increase the awareness, capacity and use of new technologies. Component IV will also build necessary infrastructure to promote growth in knowledge-based sectors such as aerospace, life sciences and alternative energy.
