= Lemmings Revolution =

2000 video game

- North American box art
- Developer: Psygnosis Leeds
- Publisher: Take-Two Interactive (Note: Published under the label of Take-Two subsidiary TalonSoft.)
- Composer: Tim Wright
- Series: Lemmings
- Platform: Windows
- Release: NA: 1 May 2000; UK: 5 May 2000
- Genre: Puzzle
- Mode: Single-player

Lemmings Revolution is a 2000 puzzle video game developed by Psygnosis Leeds and published by Take-Two Interactive. Like previous games in the Lemmings series, the object of the game is to guide the lemmings to an exit by giving them specific skills. Each level is situated on a rotating cylinder (the "revolution" of the title), so while the game is displayed in 3D, it plays much more like the 2D games.

== Gameplay ==
A level in Lemmings Revolution

The main new element in this game is the change in the level design. All levels now consist of cylindrical columns, causing the lemmings to walk in large circles on the outermost area. This essentially creates 2D levels that wrap around a cylinder from one side to the other. The levels no longer have an end at left or right, giving lemmings the ability to return to a location without retracing their route when encountering an obstacle. This whole concept was first shown in the 8-bit era game Nebulus, one of the most famous platform games for the Commodore 64 and other contemporary computers.

The levels are viewed from a single point, from which the player can rotate the level on its axis in either direction. This is similar to simply scrolling left or right in the original games. Zooming in and out is also possible at one single step. In zoomed mode, it is possible to move the camera at a fixed angle. All original eight skills from Lemmings return in this game, with the same usage. Also returning from previous games are the fast-forward button and the "nuke all" option. The level structure has also changed significantly. Once a level has been completed, two more levels become available, each slightly more difficult than the previous one. This creates a hierarchical, triangular structure, allowing more and more levels to become available as the game progresses. In this way, it is possible to play through to the final column of levels while skipping some others. There are 102 levels in total.

== Plot ==
The storyline of Lemmings Revolution revolves around Weasel characters that once entertained themselves by watching the old adventures of the lemmings. Wanting more, they have captured the lemmings and created new puzzles, so they can watch the lemmings.

== Reception ==
Reception

Aggregate score
| Aggregator | Score |
|---|---|
| GameRankings | 74% |

Review scores
| Publication | Score |
|---|---|
| AllGame | 3.5/5 |
| CNET Gamecenter | 7/10 |
| Computer Games Strategy Plus | 4/5 |
| Computer Gaming World | 4/5 |
| GameSpot | 7.1/10 |
| GameZone | 7.5/10 |
| IGN | 8/10 |
| Jeuxvideo.com | 14/20 |
| Next Generation | 4/5 |
| PC Gamer (US) | 74% |

The game received above-average reviews according to the review aggregation website GameRankings. Kevin Rice of NextGen said, "As a puzzle game that can be quite complex, Lemmings Revolution isn't for everybody. However, fans of the original will love the return to the game's roots, and newcomers will have hours of fun." Brian Wright of GamePro said, "With over 100 levels, Lemmings Revolution has enough gameplay to have puzzle fans scratching their heads for hours. Anyone looking for an addictive game should give Lemmings Revolution a spin." (Note: GamePro gave the game 3.5/5 for graphics, two 4/5 scores for sound and fun factor, and 4.5/5 for control.)
