= Clon =

Clon or El Clon may refer to:

- Clonakilty, or Clon, a town in County Cork, Ireland
- Clon (duo), a South Korean dance duo
- El Clon (TV series) ('The Clone'), a 2010 Spanish-language telenovela
- El Clon, a Mexican professional wrestler

== See also ==
- Clonmacnoise, a ruined monastery in County Offaly, Ireland
- O Clone ('The Clone'), a 2001 Brazilian telenovela
