= Star Wars (UK comics) =

Star Wars Comic
- Editor: Jon Chapple
- Categories: Sci-fi, action and adventure
- Frequency: Monthly
- First issue: 26 July 1999; 25 years ago
- Final issue: December 2014
- Company: Titan Magazines
- Country: United Kingdom
- Language: English
- Website: Official Website

Star Wars Comic was a British comic book series published monthly by Titan Magazines from 1999 to 2014. For its first five volumes of publication, the title featured comic strips reprinted from Star Wars comics originally published in the United States by Dark Horse Comics. From volume six onwards, each issue featured an original comic strip based on the Star Wars franchise.

== Publication history ==
The first volume of Star Wars Comic began publication in July 1999 to coincide with the cinematic release of The Phantom Menace. This initial run concluded in November 1999, with a second volume beginning soon after. Volumes 3 and 4 were launched to coincide with the theatrical releases of Attack of the Clones and Revenge of the Sith in 2002 and 2005 respectively, with the issue numbering beginning again from issue 1 upon the commencement of each volume. Along with the customary three reprinted American comic strips, each issue would also typically include a poster along with fan letters and artwork page titled 'Galactic Gallery'. Following the 2008 debut of the animated TV series Star Wars: The Clone Wars, a new volume of the comic would now begin when a new season of the TV show began airing, meaning there would typically be a new volume each year. The fifth volume was launched in November 2008, now being published under the name Star Wars: The Clone Wars Comic, running for thirteen issues. The comic underwent a redesign at this time, featuring a reduced page count and only a single comic strip per issue, which were now original stories produced by Titan Magazines as opposed to reprints from Dark Horse comics. The title also began to incorporate additional features such as character profiles and episode guides, as well as more child-oriented content such as puzzles. A cover gift was now typically included with each issue, as is common for children's comics in the UK. Volume six would begin in November 2009. The comic was retitled to simply 'Star Wars Comic' once again in 2014 for its seventh and final volume, running for thirteen issues before the title ceased publication entirely after fifteen years.

The final editor was Jon Chapple. Previous editors included Steve White, Andrew James, Mark McKenzie-Ray and John Freeman.

== Stories ==
=== Reprinted Material ===
The initial five volumes of Star Wars Comic featured stories re-printed from Dark Horse comics, including the following publications:

- Boba Fett: Overkill
- Dark Times
- Star Wars: The Clone Wars
- Episode I - The Phantom Menace, #1–4
- The Force Unleashed
- General Grievous
- Knights of the Old Republic
- Star Wars Rebellion: My Brother, My Enemy
- Star Wars: Republic
- Star Wars Tales
- X-wing Rogue Squadron

=== Original Stories ===
Each issue later featured new and exclusive comic strips based on Star Wars: The Clone Wars, written by Tom DeFalco and Rik Hoskin and with art by Andrés Ponce and Tanya Roberts. Each strip was a stand-alone story, as opposed to the ongoing story arcs of Dark Horse titles. Below is a list of stories featured across volumes five and six of Star Wars Comic:

- Issue 5.13: Orbital Onslaught
- Issue 6.1: Inside Job
- Issue 6.2: Keep The Faith
- Issue 6.3: In Triplicate
- Issue 6.4: The Droid Deception
- Issue 6.5: Terror on the Twilight
- Issue 6.22: Leisure
- 'A Trooper's Tale'
- 'Milk Run to Maarka'

== Related titles ==
=== Star Wars Galaxy ===
Star Wars Galaxy #17, February 2012

Titan Comics launched a second monthly Star Wars title named Star Wars Galaxy on 28 October 2010. Similar in format to that of Titan's primary Star Wars title, Galaxy typically featured three strips per issue, each reprinted from US Dark Horse comics. Occasionally, Star Wars Galaxy would run stories which had previously been printed in Titan's original Star Wars comic, such as the Star Wars Tales story "Resurrection". It was printed as a regular-sized comic book, similar to Titan's DC Collector's Edition range which featured titles such as Batman Legends. The title ceased publication in September 2012 with issue 24.

=== Totally...Star Wars: Episode I - The Phantom Menace ===
Issue 20 of Titan's Totally... magazine was a one-off special coinciding with the February 2012 3D re-release of Star Wars: Episode I - The Phantom Menace. It featured an original comic strip titled 'Duel of the Fates', written by Steve White and pencilled by Will Sliney. The strip featured several panels which could be viewed in stereoscopic 3D with the use of 3D glasses given away free with the magazine.

=== Star Wars Insider ===
Titan Magazines have also published Star Wars Insider, the official magazine of the Star Wars franchise, in the UK since 2007 and continue to do so as of February 2020.

=== Samplers ===
Short samples of Star Wars Comic were given away inside Region 2 DVDs of Star Wars: The Clone Wars season 2. Each featured a short comic strip from volume six along with additional content such as episode guides and puzzles. Digital samplers were also released by Titan for the US market.
