= Star Wars: The Clone Wars (novel) =

2008 novel by Karen Traviss

- Author: Karen Traviss
- Cover artist: John Van Fleet
- Language: English
- Subject: Star Wars
- Genre: Military science fiction
- Publisher: Del Rey
- Publication date: July 26, 2008
- Publication place: United States
- Media type: Hardcover
- Pages: 272
- ISBN: 0-345-50898-X
- Preceded by: Star Wars Episode II: Attack of the Clones
- Followed by: Star Wars: The Clone Wars: Wild Space

Star Wars: The Clone Wars, written by Karen Traviss, is the novelization of the animated film Star Wars: The Clone Wars. The audio book is narrated by Jeff Gurner. It is the first in a series of five novels designed to tie into the events of the film and the animated series. The book was released almost three weeks before the film, leading to some discrepancies between the two. The book's events, like the film and the animated series, are set between Star Wars: Episode II – Attack of the Clones and Episode III – Revenge of the Sith.

== Summary ==
The story follows the heroic Jedi Knights as they struggle to maintain order and restore peace during the tumultuous Clone Wars. More and more systems are falling prey to the forces of the dark side as the Galactic Republic slips further and further under the sway of the Separatists and their never-ending droid army. Anakin Skywalker and his Padawan learner Ahsoka Tano find themselves on a mission with far-reaching consequences, one that brings them face-to-face with crime lord Jabba the Hutt. But Count Dooku and his sinister agents, including the nefarious Asajj Ventress, will stop at nothing to ensure that Anakin and Ahsoka fail at their quest. Meanwhile, on the front lines of the Clone Wars, Obi-Wan Kenobi and Master Yoda lead the massive clone army in a valiant effort to resist the forces of the dark side.

== Differences from the film ==
Because the book was released three weeks prior to the film's premiere, there are some differences between the two works. One difference is the Battle of Teth. In the book, after the clones are defeated and Asajj Ventress and her droids are closing in on the surviving clones, there are six troopers instead of five like in the film. Also, the character dialogue features some notable differences from the film.
