= 3D Lemmings =

1995 video game

- Developer: Clockwork Games (Note: Ported to Sega Saturn by Perfect Entertainment)
- Publisher: Psygnosis
- Series: Lemmings
- Platforms: MS-DOS, PlayStation, Saturn
- Release: MS-DOS: NA: September 1995; EU/AU: October 1995; PlayStation: EU/AU: October 1995; NA: 21 November 1995; JP: 8 November 1996; Saturn: EU: 5 July 1996; JP: 23 August 1996
- Genre: Puzzle
- Mode: Single-player

3D Lemmings (Lemmings 3D in North America) is a puzzle video game developed by Clockwork Games and published for MS-DOS and Playstation in 1995 by Psygnosis. The game adapts the original Lemmings (1991) two-dimensional gameplay to three-dimensional space. A Sega Saturn version was released in 1996.

== Gameplay ==
A level in 3D Lemmings

3D Lemmings is played by using four different, movable cameras to fly around and get an overview of the level. While some levels have fixed cameras, they can usually be freely moved at any time, although without the ability to tilt up or down. Another viewing option is the "virtual lemming" (VL), which allows the player to see through the eyes of a selected lemming.

All skills from the original game are available, while one new skill has been added due to the game's 3D nature: the turner. A turner is similar to a blocker, in that it stand in one place and can only be removed by being blown up or dug out from underneath. However, instead of making other lemmings turn back, they direct them 90 degrees either left or right, as chosen by the player. Diagonally positioned blocks in levels will also make lemmings move left or right (basically reflecting them).

One of the by-products of being 3D was the importance of the camera handling. Even though most of the levels did not need complex camera setups, some levels could only be solved if the player was skilled enough to move the camera in the correct way - or by using the Virtual Lemming mode. For example, one "Tricky" level (titled "Follow the yellow brick road" only in the PC version) featured a massive indestructible brick block of wall with the lemmings arriving on top; the only way the player was able to deliver the lemmings to the bottom floor was by digging through a certain part of the brick block which was left destructible, and the only way to handle that was to use the VL mode, because the player was unable to fit the camera through the hole. Some levels include rooms or halls where the camera can not go (or come out from) and the player has to peek in through windows or use the VL mode.

The release rate buttons, i.e. to increase or decrease the rate of lemmings; instant replay mode; and fast forward button all return from previous games. Levels are once again divided into four difficulty settings: Fun, Tricky, Taxing and Mayhem. There are 20 levels of each setting, with 20 more practice levels to learn about different game elements. Each level has a set number of lemmings again, and can be returned to through the use of passwords.

Cutscenes are shown at the end of certain level milestones, which feature lemmings from the various 3D Lemmings themes (army, computer, etc.).

=== 3D Lemmings Winterland ===
An additional level pack/playable demo named 3D Lemmings Winterland was released for 3D Lemmings on the PC, which included six new levels featuring a winter theme. The gameplay was identical to the standard game.

== Development ==
The game was originally conceived as a 3D puzzle video game titled Cubewalker, in development by a team named Lunatic Software for the Amiga platform. The developers found the Amiga wasn't powerful enough to handle the game concept, so they switched development to the PC. After seeing the game, Psygnosis agreed to start full development. Following the recruitment of additional personnel, the studio underwent a name change, leading to the formation of Clockwork Games. In addition to the PC release, Sega Saturn and PlayStation versions were developed and released as well.

== Reception ==
Reception

Review scores
Publication	Score
Electronic Gaming Monthly	7.5/10, 8/10, 8.5/10, 8/10 (PSX)
Famitsu	5/10, 4/10, 5/10, 4/10 (PSX)
Game Players	2/5 (PSX)
PC Gamer (US)	Award
Sega Saturn Magazine	75% (Saturn)

The four reviewers of Electronic Gaming Monthly scored the PlayStation version an 8 out of 10, citing the "outstanding" 3D graphics and innovative, complex gameplay. Mark Lefebvre commented that "Multiple camera angles, a Training Mode for new players and an incredible interface to a very complex game are just a few reasons Lemmings 3D is a winner". GamePro panned the game, contending that the 3D view is confusing, and exacerbated by poor controls and excessive menus to navigate through.

Rob Allsetter of Sega Saturn Magazine commented that the 3D concept made the gameplay cumbersome and difficult to master: "Once you've familiarised yourself with the method it's a lot less hassle, but there are still those moments when, with only a split second left, you find yourself changing a camera angle to actually see what's going on rather than choosing lemming roles to save them." He also complained that the puzzles are highly frustrating, but acknowledged, "For the more even-tempered among you with craniums the size of the superdome this might just fit the bill".

PC Gamer US named 3D Lemmings the "Best Puzzle Game" of 1995. The editors wrote, "If you love puzzle games, 3D Lemmings should be in your collection."
