= The Warriors (video game) =

2005 beat 'em up video game

- Developer: Rockstar Toronto (Note: Ported to PlayStation Portable by Rockstar Leeds. Presented under license from and in association with Paramount Pictures.)
- Publisher: Rockstar Games
- Director: Greg Bick
- Producers: Rob Nelson; Jeronimo Barrera
- Designers: John MacPherson; Sergei Kuprejanov
- Programmer: Kevin Hoare
- Artist: Alex Horton
- Writers: Dan Van Zant; Michael Thomas Zoccano; John Zurhellen
- Composers: Steve Donohoe; Russell Simpson; Brian Vella; Jeff Scale
- Engine: RenderWare
- Platforms: PlayStation 2; Xbox; PlayStation Portable
- Release: PlayStation 2, Xbox: NA: October 17, 2005; EU: October 21, 2005; PlayStation Portable: NA: February 12, 2007; EU: February 23, 2007
- Genres: Action-adventure, beat 'em up
- Modes: Single-player, multiplayer

The Warriors is a 2005 beat 'em up video game developed by Rockstar Toronto and published by Rockstar Games. Based on the 1979 film of the same name; it was released in October 2005 for the PlayStation 2 and Xbox, and February 2007 for the PlayStation Portable; the PSP port was developed by Rockstar Leeds. The game was re-released on the PlayStation 3 in May 2013 and PlayStation 4 in July 2016, via the PlayStation Network. Set in gritty 1970s New York City, the story follows the eponymous street gang, who are framed for the murder of a respected gang leader and must return to their home turf in Coney Island while being hunted by rival gangs and the police. The game expands on the film's plot, with the first half covering events that took place three months before the events of the film.

The gameplay revolves around large scale brawling in 3D environments interspersed with other activities such as chase sequences. The game features songs from the film's soundtrack; however, as of 2016, some of them have been removed from the PS3 and PS4 versions, including "I Love Livin' in the City" and "In the City", due to licensing restrictions. Several cast members from the film returned to voice their characters in the game. Following its release, The Warriors received very positive reviews, with critics praising its controls, design, sound, music, and plot; many deemed the game to be a worthy adaptation of the film.

== Gameplay ==
The Warriors is an action-adventure survival game with a heavy focus on melee combat (specifically brawling). Other minor gameplay elements are mixed into the experience, such as the ability to use spray paint to mark turf or insult people. The game features multiple playable characters, including the Warriors' Warchief (leader) Cleon, lieutenant Swan, heavy muscles Ajax and Snow, Cleon and Swan's friends Vermin and Cowboy, the scout Fox, Harlem native Cochise, and graffiti artist Rembrandt. The player can control only one character per mission, while the others are computer-controlled. Cleon, Swan, Ajax, and Rembrandt are the most heavily featured characters. Most missions revolve around the Warriors attacking rival gangs' territory, though there are five bonus "flashback" missions that explain how certain members joined the gang; all gangs, save for the Destroyers, are taken from the film, even though they were only mentioned or briefly featured in the film itself, such as the Electric Eliminators, the Panzers and the Van Cortlandt Rangers. An arcade game called Armies of the Night (heavily based on Double Dragon) is unlocked after the main storyline of the game is completed. The playable characters are Swan and Ajax.

The Warriors' headquarters serves as a hub. From inside, the player can train (10 ranks of physical fitness such as, sit-ups, press ups, chin ups, and heavy bag, that increase stamina), talk to fellow gang members, play through rumble mode and other bonus material, walk outside to Coney Island for extra missions, or begin the next level of the story proper. The player is presented with mission objectives such as beating up a certain number of enemy gang members or stealing a certain amount of items, with more complex and creative tasks like winning a graffiti competition in SoHo, stealing goods to plant on crooked cops and rival gang members, and wild chases away from baseball bat wielding members of the Baseball Furies. Fighting takes the form of gang rumble style action with the player being assisted by other Warriors at the same time (a minimum of 1 and a maximum of 8). Combos are performed with 2-3 button chains for weak attacks, strong attacks, holds and throws. Grab attacks can be used for the playable character to perform their own unique power attack that will quickly decrease the enemy's health. The game sees the Warriors fight their way through the ranks, building a heavy rep and getting their colors out in force, until they get an invite to a meeting of all of the gangs of New York City, which is where the events of the film (and the last few missions of the game) begin.

The game progresses linearly from one mission event to the next, usually presented as a cutscene. Combat in The Warriors occurs in real-time and involves pressing buttons to initiate attacks by the on-screen character. By pausing the game, the player can find combat techniques―2-3 combos, wall smash, grab and throws, charges, body cross attack, snap attacks, weapon attacks, and counter-attacks. The player can look at the character's stats. This menu is manipulated by using the right analog stick, while movement is controlled in the 3D environment using the joystick, and camera controls are managed using the up arrow on the digital pad and the analog joystick, allowing the player to navigate the menu while avoiding or approaching enemies. In addition, players can choose to mug people, receiving money, flash, and spray graffiti. Each level contains items the player can collect or steal, such as car radios and jewelry. Completing these actions earn the player points, which count towards unlocking soldiers, arenas and game modes for Rumble Mode, the game's free-for-all multiplayer mode.

The playable character has a bar below their feet to determine their health level, reducing whenever the character takes damage, although it can be replenished by using flash. The circular grey bar inside the health bar represents the player's grappling stamina, draining upon grabbing or mounting an opponent. The top-left hand side represents the character rage meter, which, when filled, allows the player to pull off a variety of combos and styles. In rage, the player will become temporarily invincible, using finishing moves and inflicting serious damage on the opponent. The player's allies, if they are knocked out, the player can use flash to replenish their health. However, if the playable character loses all of their health, the mission ends and the player will be prompted to resume from the checkpoint or restart the mission from the beginning. Defeating enemies will cause items to fall from their bodies; flash to restore health; spray to spray over enemy gang territories; and money which can be used to purchase items from dealers.

=== Character development ===
The player can choose to help other people in Coney Island. In return for helping these people, the Warriors will learn abilities, such as defeating policemen to receive cuffs to subdue and arrest anybody, cuff-keys that will allow the player to free Warriors with keys instead of breaking cuffs, escape from cuffs themselves with cuff-keys, increase flash capacity, and earn brass knuckles and steel-toed boots to inflict more damage to the enemy. The player can choose to have the Warriors exercise in the headquarters to increase stamina.

== Synopsis ==
=== Setting ===
During The Warriors, there are a collection of levels, referred to as missions, which the player must progress through. Eighteen can be accessed, along with five more bonus missions, known as "Flashbacks", which show how the Warriors were formed, and how each member of the Warriors came to join the gang, and to unlock an arcade machine that will allow you to play Armies of the Night. The setting in the game for the Warriors is their home territory, Coney Island. Throughout the game, the player travels to other areas of New York City visiting other gangs' territories in the process. Completing the missions allows the player to replay levels, to improve on the player's score, and unlock new characters, and a game mode called "Unleash the Fury", where the Baseball Furies are controlled, though it serves as the hardest difficulty setting.

The design and casting of the characters was faithful to what was seen in The Warriors. Each character is portrayed as their respective role from the film ― Cyrus, the Riffs leader, inhabits Gramercy Park. Luther, the Rogues leader, is based out of his hearse. The Baseball Furies' territory is Riverside Park, the Lizzies' their apartment, with other smaller gangs based around the city. When starting a mission, the Warriors will occasionally stay at their home turf or travel to another place via train to use as a starting point.

Missions and events normally begin at the Coney Island headquarters, which is mostly used as a launching point throughout the game. The player can travel to places across New York City, including Tremont where the Warriors encounters the Orphans, a low-class gang, and Riverside Park which is run by the Baseball Furies, a well-respected gang. The main players travel from one turf to another across New York, to let the public radio station know there is a new gang in town. This sometimes results in the Warriors brawling with the rival gangs. The Warriors' hangout features mini-games such as a weight section and a punching bag, and a machine resembling a pinball table that gives access to the "Rumble Mode" which upon completion of missions, unlocks special stages where the player can fight all of the gangs in New York City.

=== Characters ===
The primary protagonist is Cleon, the Warriors' leader in the first two-thirds of the game until after the meeting. Cleon's role was to increase the Warriors' reputation and rid Coney Island of the Destroyers. The major protagonist is Swan, the second-in-command throughout most of the game, covering the film itself. Swan's role was to bring the Warriors back to Coney Island from the meeting where they were set up as the murderers of Cyrus. The other Warriors feature an important role with each Warrior having a role, like the heavy muscles Ajax and Snow, Vermin is the bread man, which means he is the one who carries the money, Cowboy keeps track of the Warriors' inventory, although this is only mentioned in the film. Fox is the scout who goes ahead of the Warriors, warning them if trouble is ahead, Harlem native Cochise is the watchman who watches their back when walking in a group, and Rembrandt is the Warriors' graffiti artist.

Cyrus, leader of the Grameracy Riffs appears in the game as he does in the film with more screentime as he sets the meeting in motion before the events of the movie as does his lieutenant, Masai. Mercy serves as Swan's love interest in the final part of The Warriors. The primary antagonist is Luther, the Rogues' leader, responsible for Cyrus' murder and framing the Warriors for the crime. Virgil, leader of the Destroyers, serves as an antagonist during the first half of the game and a rival and former best friends of Cleon and Vermin after betraying them. Other antagonists include Chatterbox, leader of the Hi-Hats a mime gang who attempted to kill the Warriors on two occasions and Sully, leader of the Orphans who falsely claimed their assault on the Warriors for reputation boost. Gang members like the Baseball Furies, the Turnbull AC'S, the Lizzies, and the Punks from their role in the movie appear in the game keeping their roles intact. The Warriors will encounter other gangs of New York City, which during battles and encounters with enemies, other Warrior members will assist the player in various situations.

Other areas contain other gangs of New York City, which the player must defeat in a battle. On one occasion, gang members tend to be scouts that appear in orange dots on the radar in different areas and spaces. Upon being spotted by the gang member, the scout will call for backup, and the orange circles up the radar ― the player can then choose either to attack or stealth kill the scout. Policemen will appear as blue dots on the radar; if the player commits a crime, the blue circles up the radar, the blue dots will flash and the crime that is committed will appear on the middle screen, prompting the officers to chase and attempt to handcuff the player― the player can also assault the officers or sneak into a hide area if no-one can see the player at the time. Civilians in local places will rat the player out to a gang member or the police when committing a crime that disturbs their inhabitants.

Throughout the Warriors endeavours, they will be aided by Flash, Spray, and Knife dealers, to help them out ― Flash dealers are there to supply the player with flash, a street drug that restores health, which costs 20 dollars, Spray dealers supply the player with spray paint, which costs 5 dollars, while Knife Dealers supply the player with knives, which cost 50 dollars. However, some of the dealers tend to defraud the player and make a run for it, but the player can chase them down to recover their money. However, if the player chooses to attack the dealers, they will either retaliate or run, though they will respawn. In "Rumble Mode", playable characters can also be other gangs that have been unlocked in the game, to compete against other gangs in a match of one's choosing.

=== Plot ===
The game, like the film, follows the Warriors, a Coney Island-based street gang led by Cleon. Three months prior to the events of the film, the Warriors dispose their long time rivals, the Destroyers, after defeating their leader Virgil, who Cleon and Vermin once followed. Their reputation increases over time as they humiliate a low-ranking gang, the Orphans; kill the Hi-Hats' leader, Chatterbox; spray paint trains; and ally themselves with the Saracens, whom they help set up their rivals, the Jones Street Boys, and a group of corrupt NYPD officers.

The game eventually catches up to the events of the film, when Cyrus, leader of the Gramercy Riffs, the most powerful gang in New York City, calls a meeting with all gangs in Van Cortlandt Park to propose a permanent citywide truce that would allow the gangs to control the city. Everyone opens to Cyrus' idea except Luther, leader of the Rogues, who shoots Cyrus dead, just as the police raid the meeting. In the ensuing chaos, Luther frames Cleon for the murder, resulting in the Riffs seemingly beating him to death. Swan, the Warriors' "warchief", assumes leadership of the gang as they try to make their way home, unaware they have been framed for Cyrus' murder, while the Riffs call a hit on them through a radio DJ.

The Turnbull AC fail to kill the Warriors as they board a train en route to Coney Island, only for the train to be stopped by a fire on the tracks at Tremont. While continuing their journey on foot, the Warriors re-encounter the Orphans, who hold a grudge against the Warriors after being humiliated by them. Swan parleys and calls a truce with the Orphans' leader, Sully, and the Warriors are allowed to walk through the Orphans territory unharmed. However, Sully's partner Mercy mocks him, causing him to change his mind and order his men to attack the gang. During the fight, the Warriors use a Molotov cocktail, blowing up Sully's car; impressed, Mercy joins the Warriors. The gang arrives on the 96th Street and Broadway in Manhattan, where they are chased by the police and separated. Three Warriors – Rembrandt, Vermin, and Cochise – escape via train and Mercy runs away on foot, while Fox, wrestling with a police officer, falls onto the tracks and is fatally hit by a passing train.

Swan and the remaining Warriors – Snow, Ajax, and Cowboy – are chased into Riverside Park by the Baseball Furies, where they defeat them. Afterward, Ajax notices a lone woman in the park and leaves the group to stay with her despite Swan's objections. When Ajax becomes sexually aggressive, the woman, revealed to be an undercover police officer, handcuffs him to the bench and arrests him. Arriving at Union Square, Rembrandt, Vermin, and Cochise are seduced by an all-female gang, the Lizzies, and invited into their warehouse, but escape when it's revealed to be a trap, learning the truth, everyone believes they murdered Cyrus. Meanwhile, Swan returns to 96th Street station and finds Mercy. The pair travel to Union Square on foot while forming a close bond and being stalked by the Punks, whom they eventually defeat upon reuniting with the other Warriors. Meanwhile, a gang member informs Masai and the rest of the Riffs that Luther framed the Warriors for killing Cyrus.

The Warriors finally arrive at Coney Island, only to find the Rogues waiting for them. Luther admits to murdering Cyrus for no particular reason, and challenges Swan to a one-on-one fight, before pulling out a gun. Swan dodges his shot and throws a switchblade at his hand, disarming him. The Riffs then arrive to deal with the Rogues. Luther tries to convince them the Warrior were the culprit to no avail, but Masai refused to be bamboozled for a second time and acknowledged the Warriors' courage before punishing the Rogues. The radio DJ announces the hit on the Warriors has been called off and salutes them with a song―"In The City". The game ends with the Warriors walking down the beach, finally safe and home.

== Development ==
Rockstar Games began working on The Warriors in 2002. The PlayStation 2 and Xbox versions of the game were developed by Rockstar Toronto, who were previously known as Rockstar Canada. Promotion of the game was aided by its appearance at E3 2005. The game was later ported to the PlayStation Portable platform, and developed by Rockstar Leeds. This was first announced in October 2006, and Rockstar Leeds worked with original developers Rockstar Toronto in order to make the port easier. A spokesperson had said "We have worked closely with Rockstar Toronto to maintain the extremely high standards they've set for this game," said Gordon Hall, President of Rockstar Leeds. "The PSP system allows us to deliver the experience in an entirely different way, while staying very faithful to the original source material and maintaining the high standards we set for ourselves as a developer."

=== Promotion ===
The Warriors then began to look a lot like several of Rockstar's other projects such as Grand Theft Auto: San Andreas, Manhunt, Bully and Red Dead Revolver. Despite that each of these works were developed by different production houses, the look, presentation and mechanics share a similarity due to the fact that each developer shares their toolsets and proprietary technologies with each other on a consistent basis. A combination of the company's biggest hits like State of Emergency and Manhunt, The Warriors merges multi-character co-op brawling with stealth elements. All nine playable characters feature their own unique selection of moves and strengths and offer slightly different takes on the same concept. Due to the PlayStation Portable being a handheld platform, differences to gameplay came about as a result of the port, such as the control configuration receiving a drastic change.

== Audio ==
During the review, a spokesman had stated "the audio, on the other hand, is on the other side of the scale". Many of the original actors from the film have returned to voice their characters—at least, most of the ones that are "still alive". Michael Beck, James Remar, and Dorsey Wright once again were praised in their excellent performances (despite sounding quite a bit older than the 20-something characters they play), and the remaining voice cast delivers, too. The spokesman further explains "it helps that the dialogue is well written, but there's hardly a bad voice actor in the bunch; the one weird thing about the voice work, though, is that a lot of it is made up of lines directly from the film." Some claim, however, that Rockstar may have been better off sometimes lifting audio from the original film. Some felt, alongside this, that while the audio being similar throughout the game is a benefit, it could be argued that the lines from the movie were better delivered. However, this did not have much of an effect, as many agree that the game's audio is well made. As the spokesperson further explained he said: "To begin with the voice acting for all characters in the game is very, very good. From all the main characters to plain NPCs, each and everyone is done amazingly. On the subject of sound effects in the game it's also very good. Every little thing makes a sound and does it well."

=== Voice cast ===
The Warriors features several actors from the 1979 film reprising their roles, including Michael Beck as Swan, James Remar as Ajax, Deborah Van Valkenburgh as Mercy, Dorsey Wright as Cleon, Thomas G. Waites as Fox, and David Harris as Cochise. Andy Senor replaces the late Marcelino Sánchez as Rembrandt, while Joe Lo Truglio and Kurt Bauccio replace the now-retired actors Terry Michos as Vermin and Tom McKitterick as Cowboy, respectively. While the developers made an effort to cast as much of the then-surviving members of the cast as possible, David Patrick Kelly and Roger Hill did not reprise their roles as Luther and Cyrus, instead replaced by Oliver Wyman and Michael Potts, respectively. Supporting characters were voiced by voice actors including Darryl McDaniels and Jordan Gelber.

== Reception ==
Upon its release, The Warriors received critical acclaim. Many praised the game for its deep combat and control, stating that the game helped breathe life into the brawler genre. The game was also praised for its unique seedy underbelly style, along with its story and music. Critics praised the audio as it "really shines above all else", with a replicated soundtrack and absolutely superb voice acting by many of the original actors who starred in the film. Rockstar Toronto has gained the most media coverage for its development of The Warriors, which overall received positive reviews, and made about $37 million worldwide. "Like the best of Rockstar's games, 'The Warriors' immerses you in a world that feels at once authentic and highly stylized, and it might just be the best game adaptation of a film ever in terms of capturing the mood of the original movie." 1UP.com admitted: "As fanservice, The Warriors is a treat for anyone who loves the movie, and as a beat-em-up, it outclasses recent efforts from competitors. Yet as a complete package, it's somewhat inconsistent. But with bonus missions, multiplayer rumbles, and a very fun 2-player co-op mode...we can most definitely dig it". The Warriors received a score of 7.4 for the design, the story received 8.5, while the gameplay received 7.9.

Reception

Aggregate scores
Aggregator	Score
GameRankings	85.12% (Xbox); 83.29% (PS2); 81.13% (PSP)
Metacritic	85/100 (Xbox); 84/100 (PS2); 81/100 (PSP)

Review scores
Publication	Score
1Up.com	(PS2) B+
Eurogamer	8/10 (Xbox); 7/10 (PSP); 8.1/10 (PS2)
Game Informer	8.25/10 (PS2)
GamePro	(PS2) 4.5/5
GameSpot	8.6/10 (Xbox); 8.6/10 (PS2); 8.1/10 (PSP)
GameSpy	(PS2) 4.5/5
GameTrailers	8.5/10
IGN	8.7/10 (PS2); 8.7/10 (Xbox); 8.2/10 (PSP)
X-Play	4/5 (Xbox)

Game Informer praised the feel and style of the game, stating: "The Warriors immerses you in a world that feels at once authentic and highly stylized, and it might just be the best game adaptation of a film ever in terms of capturing the mood of the original movie. Fans will notice that all of the iconic scenes of the film are recreated almost shot for shot. In addition, Rockstar Toronto has gone to the trouble of creating a completely new storyline that shows players how the Warriors came together, and the events leading up to the start of the film." The reviewer went on to applaud the developers, saying they: "Tried to stretch the conventional formula for what's considered a 'brawler'. Unlike most of the genre, where you walk down single-path alleyways, The Warriors, taking cues from other popular Rockstar titles, creates the illusion that you're in a real, living city.

"Although, sizewise, the levels are much closer to Manhunt than Grand Theft Auto, there are areas to explore both on the ground and vertically, hidden items, amazing unlockables, and numerous side missions. They've also tried to expand the gameplay to incorporate more than just fisticuffs. You can engage in all sorts of petty crime, including muggings, stealing car stereos, lockpicking, and tagging graffiti. Throw in a little more variety in the form of some cool chase and stealth sequences, and you've got something more than a typical brawler."

As Game Informer further explained, they stated: "The fighting engine itself is fairly deep, allowing you to pull off some very brutal moves with a modicum of button presses (including some cool co-op maneuvers). You'll definitely feel cool kicking ass as a Warrior, whether hand-to-hand or with any of the numerous weapons. However, I found the feel of the combat to be sluggish and chaotic at times, especially when fighting large numbers of enemies." He recommended that "turning on the option that makes it stay in split-screen, but even that is hampered by your very narrow field of vision." Critics enjoyed the graffiti writing, which is done through an "ingenious mechanic". He stated "Although it's certainly not a masterpiece, The Warriors gets by on style, flair, variety, and simple fun. The gameplay – while still enjoyable – isn't nearly as polished as it could be, the story and the appeal of the world that The Warriors recreates will be enough to pull you through to the end."

During the 9th Annual Interactive Achievement Awards, The Warriors received a nomination for "Outstanding Achievement in Soundtrack".

== Lawsuit ==
In 2006, Roger Hill, who played Cyrus in the movie, filed a lawsuit of US$250,000 ($399,265 when adjusted for inflation) against Take-Two for using his voice and depiction in the game without his permission. He claimed that it would not have been difficult for Take-Two to pay, since the game made $37 million ($59,091,284 when adjusted for inflation).

== Cancelled sequel and other games ==
A spiritual successor was planned by Rockstar Games, which was to be unrelated to The Warriors. The game was to be titled We Are the Mods and was to be set in 1960s England during the mods and rockers brawls. However, later in 2009, an arcade game was released entitled The Warriors: Street Brawl, which is a beat 'em up scroller video game created by CXTM and released on Xbox Live Arcade.

== Legacy ==
The Warriors is featured in the book 1001 Video Games You Must Play Before You Die.
