= The Warriors (soundtrack) =

The Warriors: The Original Motion Picture Soundtrack

Soundtrack album by Various Artists
- Released: March 16, 1979
- Recorded: Early 1979
- Genre: Rock; disco; funk; salsa; R&B
- Length: 36:53
- Label: A&M
- Producer: Joe Walsh; Barry De Vorzon; Joe Ferla; Kenny Vance

Professional ratings
Review scores
Source	Rating
AllMusic	Link

The Warriors: The Original Motion Picture Soundtrack is the soundtrack to the 1979 film The Warriors. The soundtrack was released on March 16, 1979, by A&M Records.

== Background ==
The album features music by Barry De Vorzon, Joe Walsh, Arnold McCuller and others. Many of the tracks are also included in the 2005 video game The Warriors.

The UK version includes "Night Run" by "The Mersh Brothers", but this was not included on later DVD releases as the movie company did not want to renew the license.

== Track listing ==
No.	Title	Writer(s)	Performed by	Length
1.	"Theme from ‘The Warriors’"	Barry De Vorzon	Barry De Vorzon	3:57
2.	"Nowhere to Run"	Holland–Dozier–Holland	Arnold McCuller	3:15
3.	"In Havana"	Steve Nathanson, Artie Ripp	Kenny Vance & Ismael Miranda	3:56
4.	"Echoes in My Mind"	Claude Cave II, Carlos Wilson, Louis Wilson, Richard Wilson, Wilfredo Wilson	Mandrill	6:09
5.	"The Fight"	Barry De Vorzon	Barry De Vorzon	1:23
6.	"In the City"	Joe Walsh, Barry de Vorzon	Joe Walsh	3:54
7.	"Love Is a Fire"	John Vastano, Vini Poncia	Genya Ravan	4:54
8.	"Baseball Furies Chase"	Barry De Vorzon	Barry De Vorzon	2:26
9.	"You're Movin' Too Slow"	Eric Mercury, William Smith	Johnny Vastano	2:54
10.	"Last of an Ancient Breed"	Desmond Child	Desmond Child	4:09
Total length:				36:53

== Charts ==
Chart (1979)	Position
Australia (Kent Music Report)	48
United States (Billboard 200)	125

== Personnel ==
- Jack Adelman - Mastering
- Bob Babbitt - Bass
- Phillip Ballou - Vocals (Background)
- Billie Barnum - Vocals (Background)
- Ben Benay - Guitar
- 'Crusher' Bennett - Percussion
- Michael Brecker - Trumpet
- Randy Brecker - Tenor Saxophone
- Chevy Chase - Vocals (Background)
- Desmond Child - Vocals
- Gary Coleman - Percussion
- Susan Collins - Vocals (Background)
- Jim Crotty - Engineer
- Bill Cuomo - Keyboards
- Rocky Davis - Keyboards
- Barry De Vorzon - Arranger, Synthesizer
- Victor Feldman - Percussion
- Joe Ferla - Associate Producer, Engineer, Remixing
- Venetta Fields - Vocals (Background)
- Diana Grasselli - Vocals (Background)
- Ed Greene - Drums
- Paul Griffin - Arranger, Clavinet, Organ, Piano (Electric), Synthesizer, Vocals (Background)
- Ula Hedwig - Vocals (Background)
- Jeff Hendrickson - Engineer
- Mitch Holder - Guitar
- Neil Jason - Bass
- Jordan Kaplan - Clavinet
- Harry Kim - Trumpet
- Clydie King - Vocals (Background)
- Russ Kunkel - Drums
- David Landau - Guitar
- Jeff Layton - Guitar
- Joe Lopes - Engineer
- Gavin Lurssen - Mastering
- Robert Mack - Bass, Guitar
- Tom Malone - Horn Arrangements, Trombone
- Pat Martin - Engineer, Remixing
- Kenny Mason - Trumpet
- Greg Mathieson - Keyboards
- Hugh McCracken - Harmonica
- Arnold McCuller - Vocals (Background)
- Monique McGuffin - Production Coordination
- Boris Menart - Engineer
- Cliff Morris - Guitar
- Rob Mounsey - Arranger, Piano, Piano (Electric)
- Steve Nathanson - Vocals (Background)
- Christopher Parker - Drums
- Mike Porcaro - Bass
- Reinie Press - Bass
- Elliott Randall - Guitar
- Genya Ravan - Vocals
- Artie Ripp - Vocals (Background)
- Gary Roberts - Vocals (Background)
- Alan Rubin - Trumpet
- Neftali Santiago - Drums, Percussion, Rhythm Arrangements
- Allan Schwartzberg - Syndrum
- Clark Spangler - Synthesizer
- David Stout - Trombone
- David Tofani - Alto Saxophone
- Gary Ulmer - Engineer
- Ian Underwood - Synthesizer
- Myriam Naomi Valle - Vocals (Background)
- Kenny Vance - Vocal Harmony, Vocals (Background)
- Luther Vandross - Vocals (Background)
- Carlos Vega - Drums
- Maria Vidal - Vocals (Background)
- Joe Vitale - Drums
- Joe Walsh - Arranger, Guitar
- Carlos Wilson - Arranger, Flute, Guitar, String Arrangements, Vocals
