= David Boswell =

US underground cartoonist and visual artist

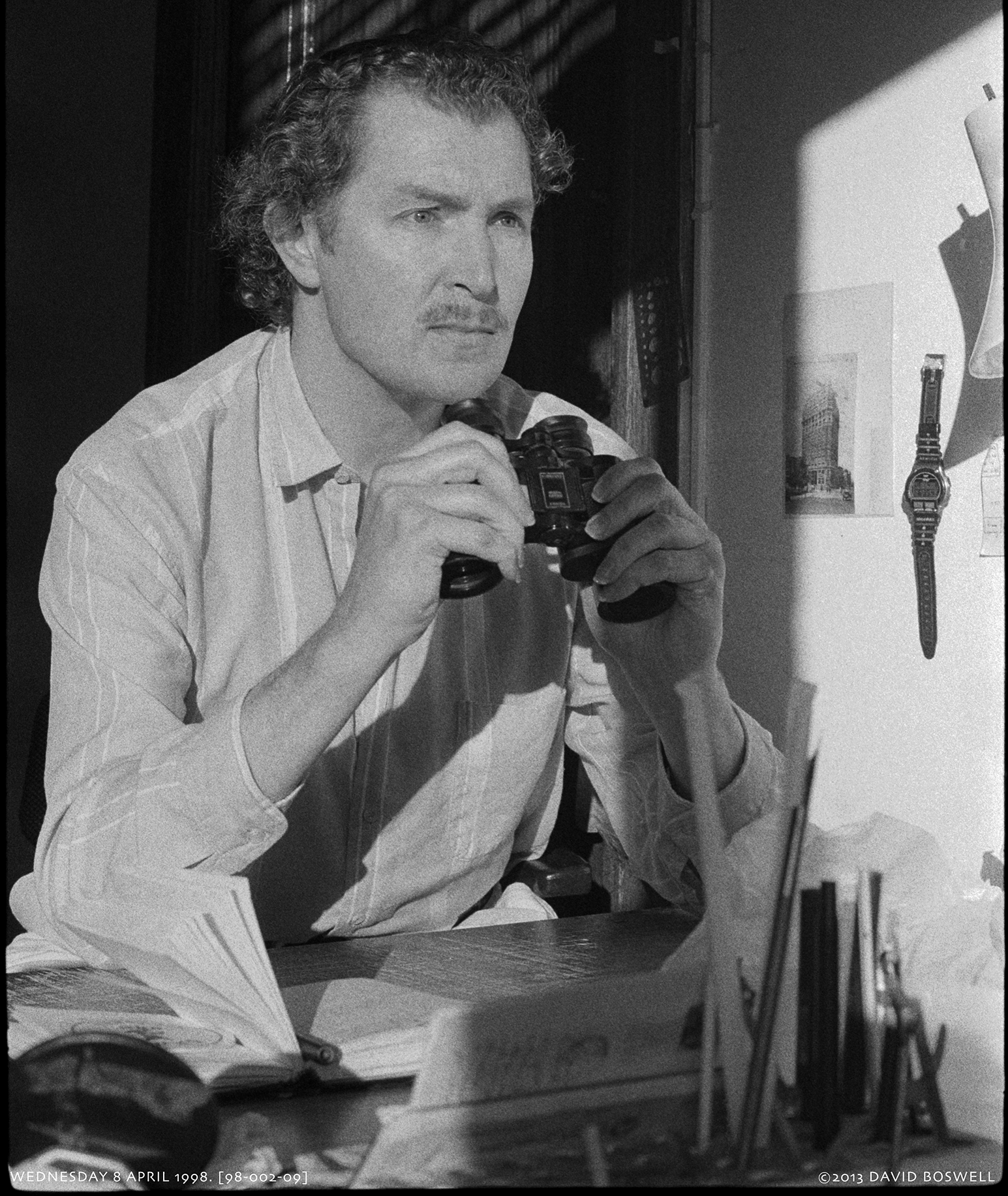
- David Boswell, cartoonist & photographer, in the Dominion Building [office 702], Vancouver, BC, Canada. 8 April 1998.
- Born: 1953 (age 72–73) London, Ontario
- Areas: Cartoonist, Writer, Penciller, Artist, Inker, Editor, Letterer, Colourist
- Notable works: Reid Fleming, World's Toughest Milkman
- Awards: 2011 Canadian Cartoonist Hall of Fame (Doug Wright Awards) "Giant of the North"

David E. Boswell (born 1953) is a comic book writer and artist, illustrator, and photographer based in Vancouver, British Columbia who has worked in the comics industry. He is the creator of the series Reid Fleming, World's Toughest Milkman.

Boswell grew up in London, Ontario, and Hamilton and Dundas, Ontario. He studied film at Oakville, Ontario's Sheridan College, where he graduated in 1974. After graduation, Boswell attempted to earn a living as a cartoonist, and his first full-page comic, "Heart Break Comics", was published in The Georgia Straight from 1977 to 1978. Boswell moved to Vancouver in 1977, and in 1978, he launched Reid Fleming, World's Toughest Milkman. Another title Boswell created is Ray-Mond.

Boswell's influences include film directors Josef von Sternberg and Luis Buñuel, composer Hector Berlioz, comedians Buster Keaton, and W.C. Fields, and humourist Robert Benchley, as well as early Hollywood and European cinema stars, and he often features references in his work. He has written a number of screenplays for movies, none of which have been made.

In 2011, Boswell was inducted into the Canadian Cartoonist Hall of Fame.

== Reid Fleming, World's Toughest Milkman ==
Boswell based the character of Reid Fleming on a childhood bully with the same name. Reid employs extremely aggressive means in delivering his dairy products. His supervisor is Mr. Crabbe, whose head is unusual in shape, and who has little, if any, patience with Reid Fleming. If it was up to him, Reid would have been fired years ago, but Reid's employer, Mr. O'Clock, prefers to just dock Reid's pay for all the milk trucks he wrecked in his recklessness (8 at the start of the story); O'Clock's reticence to fire Reid may be due to the fact that he is Reid's biological father, as implied in issue #5 (#6 under the Deep Sea Comics imprint); at the end of the issue, a scene set in the future shows that Reid is now president of the company.

Reid is in love with Lena Toast, who has a TV show with Commander Bob. The latter wears "winged boots of doom" that do not enable him to fly. He gets around in a flying house, and uses a rope ladder to literally drop in on a randomly selected guest and kidnap him or her to be interviewed on the show. He uses a power blast on uncooperative guests. He is not the only super-powered character on the show. Reid is able to lift his milk truck with his bare hands and has a degree of invulnerability that has prevented serious or lethal injury. Lena, having been divorced 3 times now, is not a good prospect for a guaranteed marriage.

Reid's favorite TV program is the soap opera, The Dangers of Ivan. He sometimes skips work to watch it. At one point, Ivan has a terrible accident while driving, spends 6 years in a coma, and, upon awakening, falls to his death from an open window. He returns as an undead monster starring in The Horrors of Ivan. Despite this drastic change, Reid remains a member of his fan club.

In Rogue to Riches, which starts right after the 1-shot Eclipse issue, Reid is finally fired by Mr. O'Clock for wrecking one truck too many (which he didn't do), shacks up with Lena, gets employment with a cable company, and, though he appears to be good at it, he and his partner are finally fired for damages to a customer's lawn gnome. He then goes to get his original job back, as it was his calling. There are dream sequences as well, showing Reid's inner anxieties and fears. A Fieldsian revelation wraps up the story.

In the 1980s, Hollywood bought the rights to the screenplay, which was written by Boswell. A film has yet to be made.

=== Publication history ===
Although Reid's adventures were first published in The Georgia Straight newspaper in 1978, the first comic book collecting them was self-published by Boswell in 1980. This 36-page magazine was the only Reid Fleming comic book for six years. The character did appear in a secondary role in the 44-page Heartbreak Comics in 1984.

In 1986, Eclipse Comics republished the 1980 issue, and then began publishing a regular series, appearing annually for five issues, and finally the unnumbered Fun with Reid Fleming in 1991. Eclipse went bankrupt in 1994, leaving Reid without a publisher for several years. From 1996 to 1998, the Canadian publisher Deep Sea Comics reprinted the 1980 issue and the five Eclipse issues as Reid Fleming, World's Toughest Milkman 1–6, followed by three issues (#7-9) of new material.

After again lying dormant for four years, Reid Fleming was revived for a Dark Horse Comics one-shot teaming him with Bob Burden's Flaming Carrot. This has been the last new Reid Fleming material to date.

2011 saw the first of two hardcover collected volumes released by IDW Publishing, Reid Fleming, World's Toughest Milkman Volume 1 contains the first Reid Fleming comic and the mini-series Rogue to Riches as well as Heartbreak Comics.

== In popular culture ==
Issue #3 of the 1991 DC Comics limited series Challengers of the Unknown features a poster depicting the character Leslie "Rocky" Davis starring in a Reid Fleming, World's Toughest Milkman movie. Reid also appears in issue #5 of that same title, threatening to "piss on [Rocky's] flowers" unless he pays a $17.28 bill. This is an allusion to a well-known scene in the 1980 self-published issue where Reid threatens to urinate on someone's flowers unless 78 cents is paid.

Issue #131 of Marvel Comics series Defenders (comics) has a one panel cameo of Reid Fleming. On page 14, Angel, Warren Worthington III, is speaking and says, "... being a superhero isn't a game -- it's deadly!" And he continues, "It's not like being a milkman -- you have to be tough --!" The next panel, Reid replies, "Oh yeah, well I'm a milkman and I'm tough! So watch it, buddy!"

== Photography ==
Boswell's 1978 photograph of Leonard Cohen is the cover photo on the authorized biography by Sylvie Simmons in the following countries: Canada [hardcover and paperback], United States [hardcover and paperback], the Netherlands, Spain, Germany, Norway, Denmark, Israel, and Poland.

== Bibliography ==
- Reid Fleming, World's Toughest Milkman, 1 issue (David Boswell, 1980)
- Heart Break Comics (David Boswell, 1984) — reprinted by Eclipse in 1988 and by Deep-Sea Comics in 1998
- Reid Fleming, World's Toughest Milkman, 1 special and 5 annual issues (Eclipse, 1986–1990)
- Fun With Reid Fleming (World's Toughest Milkman) (Eclipse, 1991)
- Reid Fleming, World's Toughest Milkman, 9 issues (Deep Sea Comics, 1996–April 1998)
- Ray-Mond (Deep Sea Comics, 1998)
- Origins of Reid Fleming, World's Toughest Milkman (Deep Sea Comics, June 1998)
- Flaming Carrot & Reid Fleming, World's Toughest Milkman (Dark Horse, 2002)
- Reid Fleming, World's Toughest Milkman Volume 1 - (IDW, 2011) HC, BW • $29.99 • 224 Pages • 8.5" x 11" • ISBN 978-1-60010-802-0
