= Roger Hill (actor) =

American actor (1948–2014)

- Hill in The Warriors, 1979
- Born: Roger W. Hill; July 31, 1949; The Bronx, New York, U.S.
- Died: February 20, 2014 (aged 64); The Bronx, New York, U.S.
- Education: City College of New York
- Occupation: Actor
- Years active: 1970–1985
- Known for: Cyrus – The Warriors
- Spouse: Stephanie Bell Hill (married 1976-1980)
- Partner(s): Ellen Holly (1984–1987)
- Children: 1

Roger W. Hill (July 31, 1949 – February 20, 2014) was an American stage, film and television actor. Beginning his acting career in the early 1970s, he was best known for his role as Cyrus, the doomed gang leader of the Gramercy Riffs, in the 1979 action thriller film The Warriors.

== Biography ==
=== Career ===
Born in the Bronx borough of New York City, Hill graduated from City College of New York. Hill portrayed the character of Lil John in the 1974 film The Education of Sonny Carson, and took on the role of Ernest Clay in the 1976 television movie Hazard's People starring John Houseman. In 1979, Hill played Cyrus in the 1979 film The Warriors. Hill was chosen to portray the doomed gang leader Cyrus after the original actor chosen for the part was a no show. After his work in The Warriors, Hill performed in the ABC Daytime soap opera One Life to Live, playing the part of Alex Lowndes from 1983–1985. Hill was in the Hart to Hart episode Murder, Murder on the Wall. Aside from his film and television career, Hill appeared in stage productions. Hill was a part of the Frank Silvera Writers’ Workshop and appeared in Off Broadway along with touring productions of Charles Gordone’s “No Place to Be Somebody,” Ed Bullins’ “The Fabulous Miss Marie” and “Hamlet”.

=== Later, personal life and death ===
In later years, Hill retired from acting and worked as a part-time librarian along with writing poetry. In 2005, Hill filed a lawsuit of $250,000 against Take-Two for using his voice and depiction in The Warriors video game. Hill claimed that it would not have been difficult for Take-Two to pay, since the game made $37 million. A spokesman for Take-Two stated that the company "has a valid third-party license for the rights to use Roger Hill's likeness and the character of Cyrus in The Warriors video game and related marketing materials". Roger married artist, Stephanie Bell Hill in 1976. Hill also had a relationship with actress Ellen Holly from 1984 until 1987. Hill had one child, a son. Hill's son, Chris Hill, is a film editor.

Hill died of a heart attack on February 20, 2014, in The Bronx, New York, at the age of 65.

== Filmography ==
Film
Year	Film	Role	Notes
1974	The Education of Sonny Carson	John 'Lil John'	
1979	The Warriors	Cyrus	
Television
Year	Title	Role	Notes
1976	Hazard's People	Ernest Clay	TV Movie
1980	Doctor Franken	Anesthesiologist	TV Movie
1982	American Playhouse	Second Man At Barbecue	1 episode: "For Colored Girls Who Have Considered Suicide / When the Rainbow Is Enuf"
1982–1985	One Life to Live	Alec Lowndes	3 episodes
1984	Once Upon a Classic: The Leatherstocking Tales	Chingachgook	4 episodes
