= Trauma (1993 film) =

1993 Italian film by Dario Argento

- Italian theatrical release poster
- Directed by: Dario Argento
- Screenplay by: Dario Argento; Eibon Klein; Ruth Jessup
- Story by: Franco Ferrini; Gianni Romoli; Dario Argento
- Produced by: Dario Argento; Chris Beckman; David Pash
- Starring: Christopher Rydell; Asia Argento; James Russo; Laura Johnson; Frederic Forrest; Brad Dourif; Piper Laurie
- Cinematography: Raffaele Mertes
- Edited by: Bennett Goldberg; Dario Argento
- Music by: Pino Donaggio
- Production companies: ADC Films; Overseas FilmGroup
- Distributed by: Republic Pictures
- Release dates: 12 March 1993 (Italy); 2 October 1993 (Vancouver International Film Festival); 29 October 1993 (U.S.)
- Running time: 106 minutes
- Country: Italy
- Language: English
- Budget: $7 million (est.)

Trauma is a 1993 Italian horror film directed by Dario Argento and starring Asia Argento, Christopher Rydell, Piper Laurie, and Frederic Forrest. Set in Minneapolis, Minnesota, it follows a troubled teenage girl who, with the help of a boyfriend, attempts to stop a serial killer who murdered her parents.

== Plot ==
In Minneapolis, chiropractic nurse Georgia Jackson stays after-hours at her practice during a rainstorm to meet a new patient. Upon arrival, Georgia thinks she recognizes the patient, but the unseen patient brutally decapitates her with an electric-powered wire garrote and leaves with her severed head.

The next day, Aura Petrescu, a troubled young Romanian immigrant suffering from a severe eating disorder, escapes from a psychiatric hospital and is saved from a suicide attempt on a bridge by David Parsons, a sober drug addict and television newswriter. Aura is soon caught by police and returned to the home of her parents, Adriana and Stefan. That night, Adriana, a fraudulent psychic, holds a séance for a group seeking the identity of a local serial killer known as the "Head Hunter". Aura flees the house and is pursued by Adriana and Stefan into the woods, where both are met by the killer, who decapitates them using the same method.

David allows Aura to stay with him at his lakeside home, but is alarmed when he finds her binging and purging the contents of his kitchen. Meanwhile, a young boy named Gabriel, breaks into a neighbor's house when his pet lizard crawls in through an open window. Inside, he discovers the killer's electric garrote.

While editing news stories about the killer's crimes, David realizes the killer appears to only strike during rainstorms. Meanwhile, Aura ventures into the city to shop at a farmer's market, where she is spotted by Dr. Judd, her obsessive former psychologist, who chases after her and forcibly takes her home with him. Judd forces Aura to consume berries that produce psychedelic effects, causing her to recall memories of the night her parents were killed. Aura subsequently awakens in the hospital during a rainstorm. The killer arrives, murdering an orderly and decapitating Hilda Volkman, a night nurse, while a drugged Aura attempts to flee. She is saved by David, who has arrived to help her escape. Aura has stolen Hilda's ring of keys, one of which is for a storage unit. Gabriel, meanwhile, notices the killer returning home that night from his bedroom window, and watches as black-gloved hands remove Hilda's severed head from a satchel.

The next morning, David and Aura venture to the storage unit to investigate. They find postcards and photographs of Hilda with her fellow nurses, among them the deceased Georgia. David identifies one of the nurses as Linda Quirk. David and Aura drive to Linda's nearby home, but she flees in her car when she sees them arrive. They track Linda to a local hotel, where they check in as guests in the room below hers. The killer soon arrives, triggering the fire sprinklers in Linda's room before decapitating her as well.

In a last-ditch effort, David tracks down Dr. Lloyd, the murdered nurses' superior who has since lost his medical career and descended into a life of destitution and drug addiction and dealing. Lloyd is reticent to speak with David. That night, the killer murders Lloyd in his apartment building by severing his head with a descending elevator. David awakens in the middle of the night to find Judd attacking Aura. Judd flees as police arrive, fatally crashing his car. In the trunk, police find the severed heads of Georgia, Hilda, Linda, and Lloyd, and conclude Judd was the killer. After the police leave, David finds Aura missing and an apparent suicide note.

Some time later, David, who has relapsed into addiction and lost his job, sees a black-clad figure in the city wearing a distinctive bracelet Aura owned. He follows the figure and comes across Gabriel in his yard, who directs him next door. David breaks into the home, and finds a nursery with the desiccated corpse of a decapitated infant, before Adriana appears and knocks him unconscious. He awakens and finds himself locked in the basement, alongside Aura. It is revealed that Adriana is the killer, who faked her death, framed Judd, and kidnapped Aura. Adriana has sought vengeance against Lloyd and his nurses, who accidentally cut off her newborn son Nicolas's head during his delivery, due to clumsiness combined with a sudden power outage caused by a thunderstorm. To cover up the accident, the nurses and Dr. Lloyd involuntarily subjected Adriana to electroshock treatment in hopes of erasing her memory of Nicolas's botched delivery and death.

A deranged Adriana prepares to kill both Aura and David, but Gabriel breaks into the house and steals her garrote. Adriana instead brandishes a fire iron, but is stopped by Gabriel, who uses the garrote to kill her. Police arrive thereafter, as David comforts a hysterical Aura.

== Cast ==
- Christopher Rydell as David Parsons
- Asia Argento as Aura Petrescu
- Piper Laurie as Adriana Petrescu
- Frederic Forrest as Dr. Judd
- Laura Johnson as Grace Harrington
- Dominique Serrand as Stefan Petrescu
- James Russo as Captain Travis
- Ira Belgrade as Arnie
- Brad Dourif as Dr. Lloyd
- Hope Alexander-Willis as Linda Quirk
- Sharon Barr as Hilda Volkman
- Isabell O'Connor as Georgia Jackson
- Tommy Lentsch as Ambulance Driver
- Cory Garvin as Gabriel Pickering
- Terry Perkins as Mrs. Pickering
- Jacqueline Kim as Alice

== Production ==
Shot in and around Minneapolis, United States in August and September 1992 on a budget of $7 million, Trauma is notable as Italian director Dario Argento's first feature-length American production, following his collaboration with George A. Romero in making Two Evil Eyes in 1990. Adapting the treatment devised by Gianni Romoli and long-time Argento collaborator Franco Ferrini, Argento chose T.E.D. Klein as his co-writer.

Special effects expert Tom Savini, who had previously worked on Two Evil Eyes, was recruited to produce the films extensive gore and prosthetic effects. Savini also created the film's central murder weapon, dubbed the "Noose-o-Matic" by the crew. Savini devised a number of elaborate effects, but they were scrapped when Argento decided to minimize his trademark gore; according to Savini, "Edge-of-the-seat suspense is what he was after". Savini was also set to appear in a scrapped pre-credits sequence where his character was to be decapitated in an accident, an event that would trigger the killer's psychosis.

The character played by Asia Argento, who was 17 during filming, is inspired by her half-sister Anna (Daria Nicolodi's daughter from a previous marriage), who actually suffered from anorexia. Anna died in a scooter accident in 1994 shortly after the film's release, but she is seen in the film during the closing credits dancing on the balcony.

Dario Argento's usual- collaborating rock-band Goblin were originally suggested to write and perform the music score for the film, but were declined by the American producers who wanted something more friendly to the American audience; therefore, Pino Donaggio's orchestral score was used. In the closing credits, a reggae song is performed by Innocent Mafalingundi and his band Les Exodus. It crossfades into Donaggio's "Ruby Rain", sung by Laura Evan to lyrics by Paolo Steffan, which appears earlier in the film too.

== Release ==
Trauma opened in Italy on 12 March 1993. It later screened at the Vancouver International Film Festival on 2 October 1993, and opened in Minneapolis at the University of Minnesota's Film Society on 29 October 1993.

=== Critical reception ===
Slant Magazine called Trauma "a bizarre, psychologically repressive thriller that smacks of lesser De Palma" that is "convoluted to the point of distraction, worth savoring solely for Argento's excesses of gore." It currently has an approval rating of 50% on movie review aggregator website Rotten Tomatoes, based on 6 reviews. On Metacritic, it has an average score of 64 out of 100, based on reviews from 8 critics, indicating "generally favorable reviews".

=== Home media ===
Trauma was released on VHS in the United States by WorldVision Home Video on March 23, 1994. Anchor Bay Entertainment released the film on DVD in 2005. In September 2021, Vinegar Syndrome released it on Blu-ray.

== Alternate versions ==
- A special uncut version was made available on video which features seven minutes of footage omitted from foreign prints, including:
  - a new introduction of the Aura and David characters in which David drives Grace to the airport and sees Aura being beaten by a man whose plane ticket she tried to steal;
  - Grace visiting David at the TV station and asking him about Aura. David invites Grace to his house and then calls Aura at home to ask her if she needs any food; Aura lies to him and says she's already eaten;
  - Aura visits a market and is spotted by Dr. Jarvis, who tries to catch her;
  - After David and Aura escape from the Marigold, she tells him she's taken a little souvenir from Nurse Volkmann's purse; another new shot shows the Marigold's owner talking to the police;
  - David checks into a hotel after following Linda Quirk's car and asks for a room overlooking the parking lot;
  - David asks for information about Dr. Lloyd in a saloon;
  - After David calls Grace and asks her for prescription forms, she meets and confronts him, trying to make him face the fact that he's become a junkie;
  - The death scenes of Linda Quirk and the killer are more graphic (the wire is seen cutting through Linda's neck).

This version is currently available on streaming platforms.

- The British Board of Film Classification cut the UK video release by six seconds. There are two cuts, both to shots of wire cutting into the necks of Linda and Adriana. However, these cuts were waived in 2002, and all subsequent DVD releases are uncut. All UK video and DVD releases contain the shorter version.

== Sources ==
- Howarth, Troy (2020). Murder by Design: The Unsane Cinema of Dario Argento. Baltimore, Maryland: Midnight Marquee Press. ISBN 978-1-644-30115-9.
- Jones, Alan (2005). Profondo Argento: The Man, The Myths and the Magic. FAB Press. ISBN 978-1-903254-24-0.
