= Wes Craven's Chiller =

- DVD cover
- Chiller
- Genre: Horror ⋅ Sci-Fi ⋅ Thriller
- Written by: J.D. Feigelson
- Directed by: Wes Craven
- Starring: Paul Sorvino ⋅ Michael Beck ⋅ Beatrice Straight ⋅ Laura Johnson ⋅ Dick O'Neill ⋅ Alan Fudge ⋅ Craig Richard Nelson
- Music by: Dana Kaproff
- Country of origin: United States
- Original language: English

Production
- Executive producer: Richard Kobritz
- Producer: J.D. Feigelson ⋅ Anderson G. House
- Editor: Duane Hartzell
- Running time: 94 min.
- Production company: Frozen Man Productions ⋅ J.D. Feigelson Productions ⋅ Polar Films

Original release
- Network: CBS
- Release: May 22, 1985

Chiller (also known as Wes Craven's Chiller) is a 1985 American made-for-television horror film directed by Wes Craven and written by J.D. Feigelson. It follows corporate executive Miles Creighton (Michael Beck), who dies and is cryonically preserved in the hopes that he can be revived. Ten years later, the procedure is a success, and Miles returns, but without his soul. The film premiered on CBS on May 22, 1985.

== Plot ==
Miles Creighton is cryonically preserved. When his storage tank malfunctions and begins to thaw, Miles is rushed to a hospital. His mother, who has missed her son terribly during his 10-year incapacitation, arranges for surgeons there to perform a procedure that was not possible when Miles was originally frozen. The operation is a success and Miles revives.

Miles returns to the company which his father (now deceased) had started. He ruthlessly strips down anything that the company does not require to be profitable, and fires the man responsible for keeping the company running in Miles' absence.

A series of mysterious deaths occur and circumstantial evidence implicates Miles. His mother, of course, does not want to believe her beloved son is a heartless killer. It is only when Father Penny arrives at the hospital in critical condition that she is convinced her son is evil. Penny tells her that Miles was responsible, and she rushes home to save her step daughter and have Miles arrested.

The events that follow pit Miles against his mother, and she ends up locking him in a walk-in freezer. The police arrive and discover that Miles, though apparently frozen, is still alive. His mother comes to the rescue by shooting her son in the chest with a policeman's revolver. At the hospital later, it is implied Miles survived but it is unclear if he will survive the surgery as the techniques to save his life 'aren't quite there yet'.

The final scene is set at the cryogenics facility, where another alarm goes off as another storage tank malfunctions and begins to thaw. This is followed by several more storage tanks malfunctioning.

== Cast ==
- Michael Beck as Miles Creighton
- Beatrice Straight as Marion Creighton
- Laura Johnson as Leigh Kenyon
- Dick O'Neill as Clarence Beeson
- Alan Fudge as Dr. Stricklin
- Craig Richard Nelson as Dr. Collier
- Paul Sorvino as Reverend Penny
- Jill Schoelen as Stacey Creighton
- Anne Seymour as Mrs. Bunch
- Russ Marin as Dr. Sample
- Jerry Lacy as Jerry Burley
- Edward Blackoff as 2nd Technician
- Kenneth White as Technician #1
- Ned Wertimer as Mr. Hanna
- Wendy Goldman as Secretary
- Joseph Whipp as Detective
- Brian Libby as Orderly
- Karen Huie as Nurse #1
- Melanie F. Williams as Nurse #2
- Perla Walter as Night Nurse
- Starletta DuPois as Nurse
- Mimi Craven as Nurse Cooper
- Bill Dearth as Officer #1
- Roger Hampton as Officer #2
- Clare Torao as Newscaster (as Clare Nono)
- William Forward as Anesthesiologist
