= Hızlı Gazeteci =

Comic strip hero from Turkey created by Necdet Sen

Hızlı Gazeteci ("Speedy Journalist" in Turkish) is a daily comic strip hero from Turkey. Created by Necdet Sen. First appeared in a music magazine that called "Hey" in December 1980. It was published in daily newspapers Cumhuriyet and Hürriyet between 1984 and 1996.

Hızlı Gazeteci strips tell satirical stories of a lonely and sarcastic journalist. The serial has discussed by intellectuals and media during publishing period. The author judged two times for insulting president, police and army.

After 2002, all of Hızlı Gazeteci stories reprinted as albums from Parantez Books.

== Sources ==
- Author's website
