= Houston Knights =

American crime drama television series

- Genre: Crime drama
- Created by: Michael Butler; Jay Bernstein
- Starring: Michael Beck; Michael Paré; Robyn Douglass
- Composers: Dennis McCarthy; George Doering
- Country of origin: United States
- No. of seasons: 2
- No. of episodes: 31

Production
- Running time: 60 minutes
- Production companies: Jay Bernstein Productions; Columbia Pictures Television

Original release
- Network: CBS
- Release: March 11, 1987 – June 7, 1988

Houston Knights is an American crime drama television series that aired on CBS from March 11, 1987, to June 7, 1988. Created by Michael Butler and Jay Bernstein, the series was produced by Jay Bernstein Productions in association with Columbia Pictures Television. It stars Michael Paré as Sergeant Joey LaFiamma, a Chicago police officer transferred to the Houston Police Department after killing a mobster who had placed a contract on his life, and Michael Beck as Sergeant Levon Lundy, a Houston detective and descendant of a Texas Ranger. The series premiered as a midseason replacement and ran for two seasons totaling 31 episodes.

== Summary ==
The core of the series is the partnership between two very different cops from two different cultures. Chicago cop Joey LaFiamma, played by Michael Paré, is transferred to Houston after he kills a mobster from a powerful Mafia family and a contract is put out on him. Once there, he is partnered with Levon Lundy, played by Michael Beck, the grandson of a Texas Ranger.

Although as different as night and day, and after a rocky beginning (the two engage in a fist-fight) they form a successful partnership and become friends. This is aided to a certain extent by an event where a hitman from Chicago who holds the contract to shoot La Fiamma arrives in Houston and is ultimately killed by Lundy.

During the series, it is revealed that both La Fiamma and Lundy have their own personal demons. La Fiamma's Chicago partner had been killed when the partner went into a crime scene while La Fiamma had waited for backup to arrive. Lundy's wife had been killed by an explosion that was intended to kill him.

== Background ==
Producer Jay Bernstein said the show "goes against the grain of current television thinking. It's an hour-long episode show at a time when half-hour comedy is king. It features two male police officers when family situation stories are hot."

Bernstein said the leads needed to say what America should be... Houston Knights was created on a formula that started with Columbia Pictures. They had these two-reelers during the 1930s using two leading men who always fought with each other. There was the same relationship between John Wayne and Randolph Scott in the 1940s in movies like Pittsburgh. This is different for television, but has been used in the movies since the 1930s. These are principled men. They're in the 1980s but with the conservative morals of the 1940s."

The show was renewed for a second season. Beck said his relationship on air with Pare would be "less abrasive... We used that as a starting-off point, but everyone now feels that coming into living rooms that way, week after week, might grow a little tiring for the viewer. We'll have more of a needling instead of an 'I-hate-your-guts' feel between them. There'll still be a rivalry and animosity there, but not quite so hard-edged."

== Music ==
The theme music for the series was Texan blues-rock style, opening with a steamy saxophone then featuring slide guitar work and a heavy bass line. Dennis McCarthy and George Doering composed the music for the series. Lee Ritenour is also credited as a major contributor to the music featured in the series.

== Features ==
One of the key features of the show was the car driven by La Fiamma, an ice-blue 289 AC Cobra "replicar", credited as being provided by "North American Fibreglass". The car was yet another way to demonstrate that La Fiamma didn't "fit" in Texas, as most other characters on the show drove pickup trucks (including Lundy).

The wardrobe for La Fiamma consisted of well-cut and stylish Italian label clothing, another contrast to Lundy, who was always attired in typical Texas "cowboy" clothes.

== Reception ==
The New York Times said the pilot "is so confused and confusing that it is impossible to tell whether this latest police-detective romp can pull itself together long enough to have a shot at surviving."

== Episodes ==
The titles of the 31 episodes are listed below, along with their original TV air dates. Although they are listed separately, the first two episodes were originally screened as a movie-length pilot. The first 9 episodes comprised the first season, the remaining 22 episodes formed season two. The first season ranked 34th out of 79 shows with a 15.1/26 rating/share.

=== Season 1 (1987) ===
No. overall	No. in season	Title	Directed by	Written by	Original release date
1	1	"Mirrors: Parts 1 & 2"	Gary Nelson & Richard Lang	Michael Butler & Eric Blakeney & Gene Miller	March 11, 1987
2	2	"Mirrors: Parts 1 & 2"	Gary Nelson & Richard Lang	Michael Butler & Eric Blakeney & Gene Miller	March 11, 1987
3	3	"North of the Border"	Mike Vejar	Clyde Phillips & Stan Berkowitz	March 18, 1987
4	4	"Houston's Hero"	Thomas J. Wright	teleplay: Joseph Gunn and Eric Blakeney & Gene Miller; story: Joseph Gunn	March 25, 1987
5	5	"Single in Heaven"	Richard Compton	Michael Ahnemann	April 1, 1987
6	6	"Yesterday's Gone"	Thomas J. Wright	Shel Willens	April 8, 1987
7	7	"Bad Girl"	Georg Stanford Brown	Michael Ahnemann	April 15, 1987
8	8	"Scarecrow"	David S. Jackson	Michael Butler, Paul Diamond	April 22, 1987
9	9	"Colt"	Thomas J. Wright	Paul Diamond	April 29, 1987

=== Season 2 (1987–88) ===
No. overall	No. in season	Title	Directed by	Written by	Original release date
10	1	"Moving Violation"	Paul Krasny	Stan Berkowitz	September 15, 1987
11	2	"Heads I Win, Tails You Lose"	Dale White	Story by : Jay Bernstein; Teleplay by : Nancy Ann Miller	September 22, 1987
12	3	"Desperado"	Reza Badiyi	Story by : Deborah Arakelaian; Teleplay by : Valerie West	October 6, 1987
13	4	"Gun Shy"	Paul Krasny	Elliott Anderson & Lawrence Levy	October 13, 1987
14	5	"Lady Smoke"	Richard Colla	Story by : Stephen Katz; Teleplay by : Paul Diamond	October 20, 1987
15	6	"God's Will"	Michael O'Herlihy	E. Nick Alexander	November 3, 1987
16	7	"Diminished Capacity"	Alexander Singer	Phil Combest	November 10, 1987
17	8	"Home Is Where the Heart Is"	Don Chaffey	Herman Miller	November 17, 1987
18	9	"Secrets"	Ivan Dixon	Paul Diamond	December 8, 1987
19	10	"Somebody to Love"	Rick Berger	Paul Schiffer	December 22, 1987
20	11	"There's One Born Every Minute"	Reza Badiyi	Nancy Ann Miller	January 2, 1988
21	12	"Vigilante"	Ivan Dixon	Elliott Anderson & Lawrence Levy	January 9, 1988
22	13	"The White Hand"	Aaron Lipstadt	Story by : Alex Gansa & Howard Gordon; Teleplay by : Scott Ahnemann & Karl Precoda	January 16, 1988
23	14	"Sins of the Father"	Michael Fresco	John Miglis	January 30, 1988
24	15	"Crime Spree"	Sidney Hayers	Gregory S. Dinallo	February 6, 1988
25	16	"Cajun Spice"	William Fraker	Elliott Anderson & Lawrence Levy	February 13, 1988
26	17	"The Stone"	Jerry Jameson	Elia Katz	February 20, 1988
27	18	"Burnout"	James Quinn	Stan Berkowitz	February 27, 1988
28	19	"Love Hurts"	Larry Shaw	Paul Diamond	April 26, 1988
29	20	"Bad Paper"	Jerry Jameson	John Miglis	May 3, 1988
30	21	"For Caroline"	Randy Roberts	Robin Bernheim	May 10, 1988
31	22	"The Jungle Fighter"	Jerry Jameson	Robert Bielak	June 7, 1988
