= Dorsey Wright =

American actor

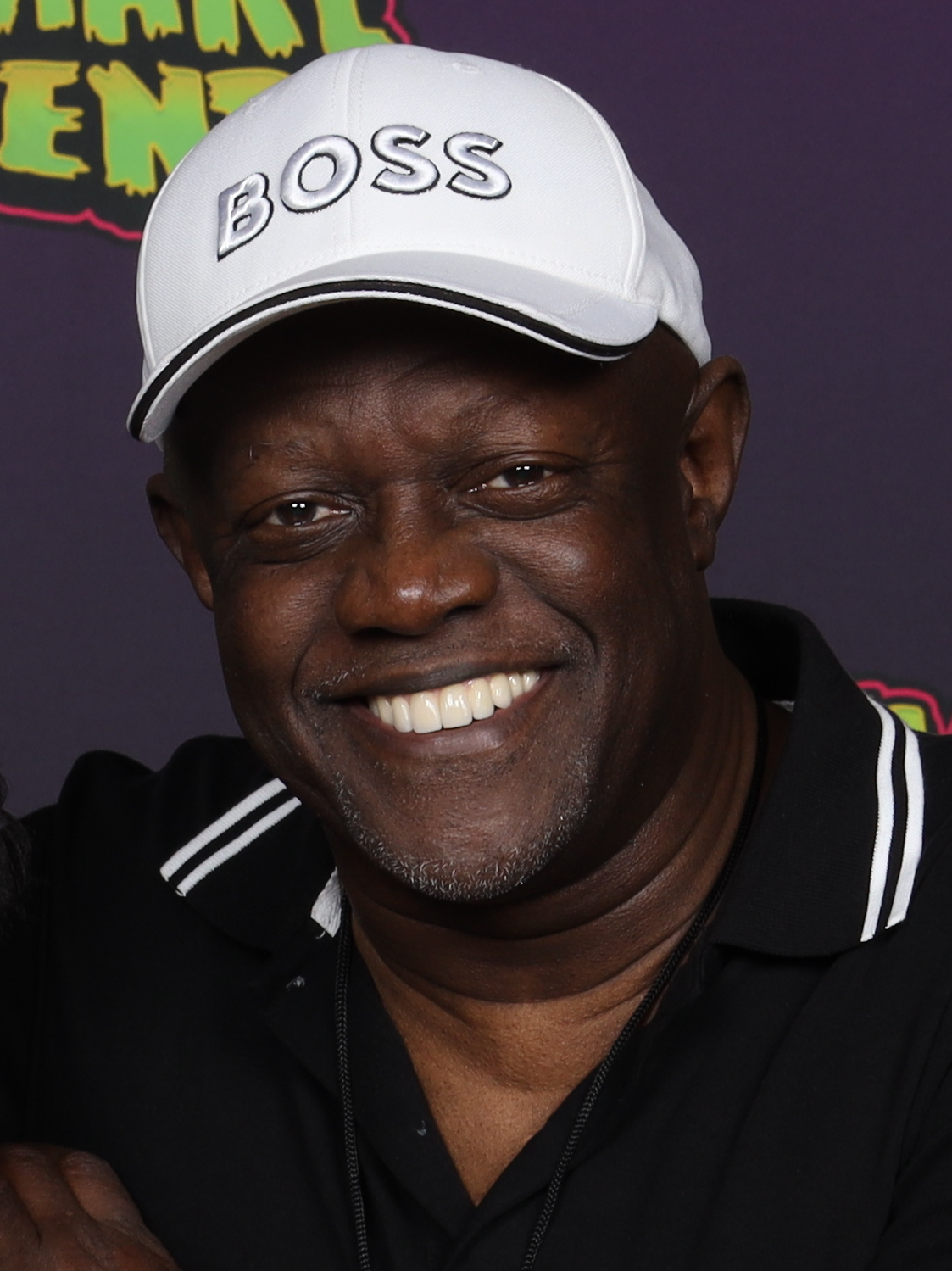
- Wright in 2024
- Born: Philadelphia, PA, U.S.A
- Occupation: Actor
- Years active: 1979–present

Dorsey Wright is an American actor, best known for his role as Cleon in the 1979 film The Warriors.

== Biography ==
Wright was born in Philadelphia, PA, and earned his first acting role in 1979, in The Warriors, for which he is best remembered. He co-starred in the film version of Hair that same year. In 1981, he appeared as a gang member in the film Ragtime and played Junior Jones in the 1984 film adaptation of John Irving's novel The Hotel New Hampshire.

Dorsey Wright was, for a brief time, part of a not-for-profit theater group based in New York City, called the Theater for the Forgotten. The project was run by founders Akila Couloumbis and Beverly Rich, funded by The National Council for the Arts and several other sources. The brainchild of Akila Couloumbis, the group put on plays for the institutionalized, ranging from prisons and drug rehab to hospitals in six states for thirty years, a long run for a creative non-profit organization. Some of the plays were written in collaboration with the theater groups Dream 76 and Forever My Earth.

Wright is now retired after working 30 years as a conductor for the New York Transit Authority and does voice-overs for television and radio commercials. In 2005, he reprised his role as Cleon in the video game version of The Warriors. Recently, he has begun writing and directing his own films.

== Filmography ==
=== Film ===
Year	Title	Role	Notes
1979	The Warriors	Cleon	
1979	Hair	Lafayette aka Hud	
1981	Ragtime	Gang Member #4	
1984	The Hotel New Hampshire	Junior Jones	
2013	Vamp Bikers	Priest Elias	Also second unit director
2015	Vamp Bikers Dos	The Priest	
2015	The Warriors: Last Subway Ride Home	Cleon	Video

=== Television ===
Year	Title	Role	Notes
1984	100 Centre Street	Stenographer Andre Bussey	Television film
1984	E/R	Jackson	Episode: "Pilot: Part 1"

=== Video games ===
Year	Title	Role	Notes
2005	The Warriors	Cleon	
2013	Grand Theft Auto V	Paramedic	
