= Jery Hewitt =

American actor and stuntman

- Born: Gerald Robert Hewitt; March 6, 1949; Brooklyn, New York, U.S.
- Died: November 21, 2020 (aged 71); Warwick, New York, U.S.
- Education: State University of New York
- Occupations: Actor, stuntman

Gerald Robert Hewitt (March 6, 1949 – November 21, 2020) was an American actor and stuntman. He was best known for playing Cobb, the leader of the Baseball Furies gang, in the 1979 film The Warriors.

== Life and career ==
Hewitt was born in Brooklyn, New York, the son of Harry Jefferson Hewitt and Marjorie Potts. He attended the State University of New York, earning his degree in food science. He began his screen career in 1979, playing Cobb, the leader of the Baseball Furies gang, in the film The Warriors. In the same year, he appeared in the film The Wanderers. In 1980, he performed stunts in the films Simon, Hot T-Shirts, The Exterminator and Christmas Evil.

Later in his career, Hewitt performed stunts in the Coen brothers's films such as The Big Lebowski, True Grit, No Country for Old Men, O Brother, Where Art Thou? and Raising Arizona. He also performed stunts in numerous films such as Ghostbusters II, The Saint of Fort Washington, Independence Day, School of Rock, The Royal Tenenbaums, Remo Williams: The Adventure Begins, The Manchurian Candidate, Analyze That, The Bourne Ultimatum, Good Will Hunting, Scent of a Woman, The Birdcage and Reign Over Me, and the television franchise Law & Order.

== Death ==
Hewitt died on November 21, 2020, in Warwick, New York, at the age of 71.
