= Konrad Sheehan =

American actor and stuntman

- Sheehan in The Warriors, 1979
- Occupations: Actor, stuntman

Konrad Sheehan is an American actor and stuntman. He is best known for playing Vance, the roller skating leader of the Punks gang, in the 1979 film The Warriors.

== Life and career ==
Sheehan is adopted, and his adoptive father is Barry Salottolo, a teacher at Mount Vernon High School. He attended Iona Preparatory School in New Rochelle, New York. He began his screen career in 1978, becoming a stuntman for Irvin Kershner's film Eyes of Laura Mars. In the same year, he performed stunts in the film Boardwalk, and he played Vance, the roller skating leader of the Punks gang, in the film The Warriors.

Later in his career, Sheehan performed stunts in films such as Raging Bull, Fort Apache, The Bronx, Brubaker, Alamo Bay, Hanky Panky, The Secret of My Success, Ragtime, The Chosen and Ishtar. He also appeared in the film The Wanderers.
