= Michael Beck =

American actor (born 1949)

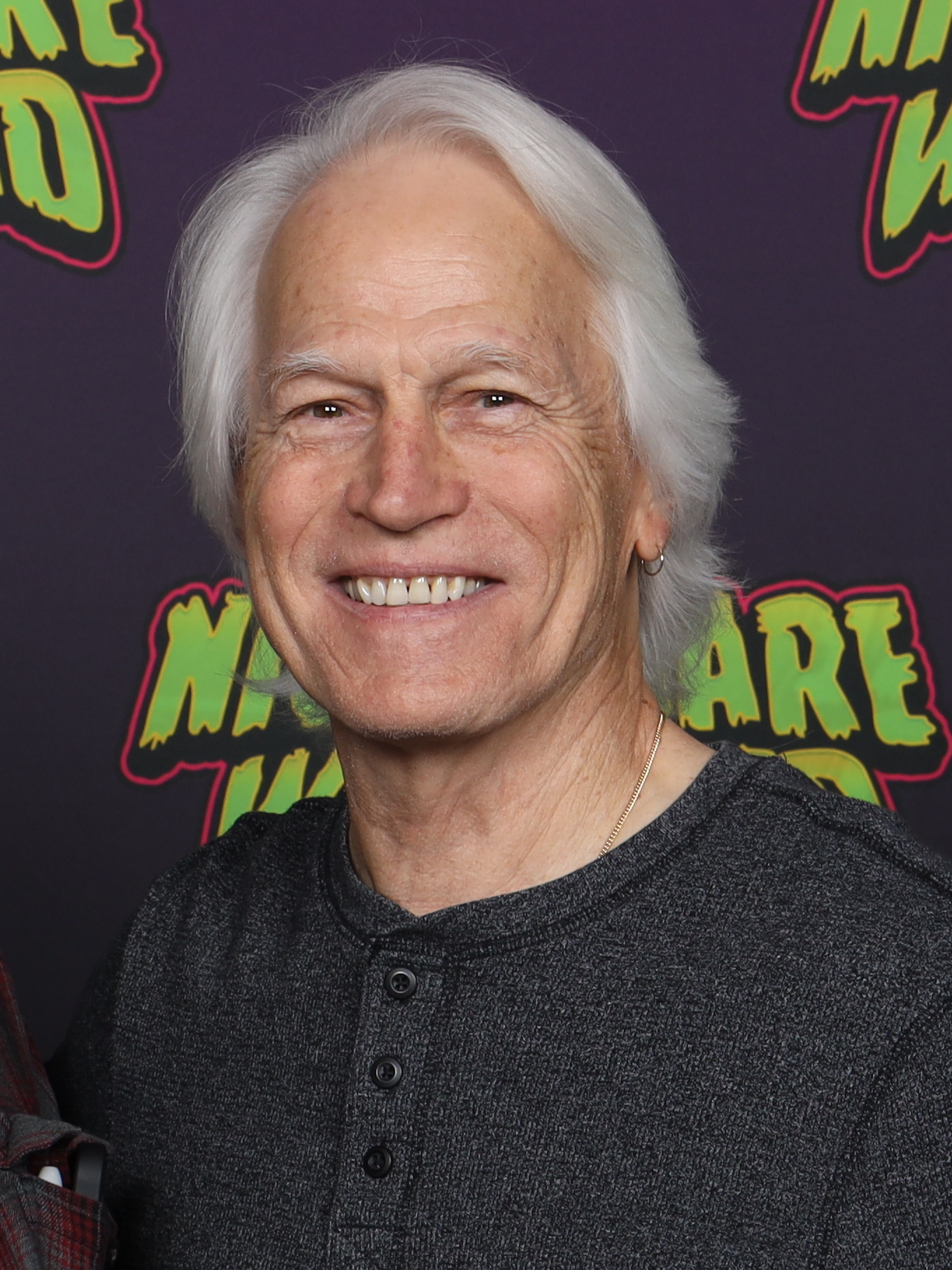
- Beck in 2024
- Born: February 4, 1949 (age 77); Memphis, Tennessee, U.S.
- Education: Royal Central School of Speech and Drama
- Occupation: Actor
- Years active: 1971–present

Michael Beck (born February 4, 1949) is an American actor. He is known for his roles as Swan in The Warriors (1979), as Sonny Malone in Xanadu (1980), and as Koda in Triumphs of a Man Called Horse (1983).

== Early life ==
Beck was born in Memphis, Tennessee, the third of nine children. He attended Memphis University School and then Millsaps College in Jackson, Mississippi on a football scholarship. While in college, he was a member of the Kappa Alpha Order fraternity. After graduating with a degree in economics, he was one of 30 (out of 2,500) applicants chosen for London's Central School of Speech and Drama. Beck's stage credits, beginning with college, include Camelot (as King Arthur), Of Mice and Men (as George Milton), Romeo and Juliet (as Tybalt), and Cat on a Hot Tin Roof.

== Career ==
Beck is known predominantly for his roles as Swan for the action movie The Warriors (1979), Sonny Malone for Xanadu (1980), Lieutenant Commander Dallas in Megaforce (1982), and Koda for Triumphs of a Man Called Horse (1983). Both the Xanadu and Megaforce roles garnered him Razzie nominations, for Worst Actor and Worst Supporting Actor, respectively. Beck has appeared in other movies such as Warlords of the 21st Century (1982), Wes Craven's Chiller (1985), Gone to Texas (1986) as James Bowie, and Forest Warrior (1996).

He appeared as Hans Helms in the 1978 television miniseries Holocaust, and featured with Michael Paré in the CBS police drama Houston Knights (1987–1988). Beck appeared in television shows such as JAG, Walker, Texas Ranger, In the Heat of the Night, as the Mars-born terrorist-turned-cyborg assassin Abel Horn in Babylon 5 (episode "Spider in the Web"), and as Mr. Jones in the spin-off television series Crusade.

Beck has narrated numerous audiobooks of John Grisham's novels. He also narrated Confederates in the Attic by Tony Horwitz, A Darkness More Than Light by Michael Connelly, State of the Union by David Callahan, the unabridged version of Bill Clinton's My Life, and numerous religious books including the Bible. He also reprised his role as Swan in 2005, lending his voice to the popular video game adaptation of The Warriors.

== Personal life ==
Beck is a born-again Christian.

== Filmography ==
=== Film ===
Year	Title	Role	Notes
1971	The Hard Ride	Highway Thug	Uncredited
1978	Madman	Boris Abramovich	
1979	The Warriors	Swan	
1980	Xanadu	Sonny Malone	
1982	Battletruck	Hunter	aka Warlords of the 21st Century and Destroyers
1982	Megaforce	Dallas	
1983	Triumphs of a Man Called Horse	Koda	
1983	The Golden Seal	Crawford	
1996	Forest Warrior	Arlen Slaighter	
1998	The Jungle Book: Search for the Lost Treasure	Professor Gershwin Donovan	
2015	The Grace of Jake	Henry Haynes	
2015	The Warriors: Last Subway Ride Home	Swan	Video

=== Television ===
Year	Title	Role	Notes
1977	Ryan's Hope	Unknown	2 episodes
1978	Holocaust	Hans Helm	3 episodes
1979	Mayflower: The Pilgrims' Adventure	John Alden	Television film
1980	Alcatraz: The Whole Shocking Story	Clarence Carnes	Television film
1981	Fly Away Home	Mark	Television film
1983	The Last Ninja	Kenjiro Sakura	Television film
1984	Celebrity	T.J. Luther	3 episodes
1984	The Streets	Sergeant Danny Wreade	Television film
1984	Rearview Mirror	Jerry Sam Hopps	Television film
1985	Chiller	Miles Creighton	Television film
1985	Blackout	Mike Patterson	Television film
1986	Gone to Texas	James Bowie	Television film
1987–1988	Houston Knights	Sergeant Levon Lundy	30 episodes
1989	Murder, She Wrote	Danny Schubert	Episode: "The Search for Peter Kerry"
1990	Murder, She Wrote	Justin Fields	Episode: "Trials and Tribulations"
1990	Only One Survived	Paul Haskel	Television film
1991	Deadly Game	Peterson	Television film
1991	Stranger at My Door	Jimmy Lee Dancey	Television film
1991	Final Judgement	Delaney	Television film
1993	Fade to Black	Braith	Television film
1993	In the Heat of the Night	Sonny Roper	Episode: "A Deadly Affection"
1993	Murder, She Wrote	Brian Bentall	Episode: "The Big Kill"
1994	Robin's Hoods	Detective Stephen DeCosta	3 episodes
1994	Babylon 5	Abel Horn	Episode: "Spider in the Web"
1995	McKenna	Jon Doe / Alex	Episode: "Racing in the Streets"
1996−1998	Walker, Texas Ranger	Adam McGuire	2 episodes
1997	Diagnosis: Murder	Frank Waldeck	Episode: "Deadly Games"
1998	Born Free	Luke	Episode: "The Reunion"
1999	Crusade	Mr. Jones	Episode: "The Well of Forever"
2001	Nash Bridges	Adult Bobby Bridges	Episode: "Quack Fever"
2004	JAG	Senator Carter Innes	Episode: "Whole New Ball Game"

=== Video games ===
Year	Title	Role	Notes
2005	The Warriors	Swan	

== Audiobooks ==
Year	Title	Author	Notes
2024	The Holy Bible: The New Revised Standard Version (Updated Edition, with the Apocrypha)	National Council of Churches	
2023	The Holy Bible: The New Revised Standard Version - Updated Edition	National Council of Churches	
2023	Trust: Knowing When to Give It, When to Withhold It, How to Earn It, and How to Fix It When It Gets Broken	Henry Cloud	Non-fiction
2022	The Boys From Biloxi	John Grisham	
2020	A Time for Mercy	John Grisham	Third book featuring Jake Brigance
2020	Camino Winds	John Grisham	Sequel to Camino Island
2019	The Guardians	John Grisham	
2018	The Reckoning	John Grisham	
2013	Sycamore Row	John Grisham	
2008	The Appeal	John Grisham	
2006	The Summons	John Grisham	
2006	The Brethren	John Grisham	
2006	The King of Torts	John Grisham	
2006	A Time to Kill	John Grisham	
2005	The Broker	John Grisham	
2004	My Life	Bill Clinton	
