= David Harris (American actor) =

American actor (1949–2024)

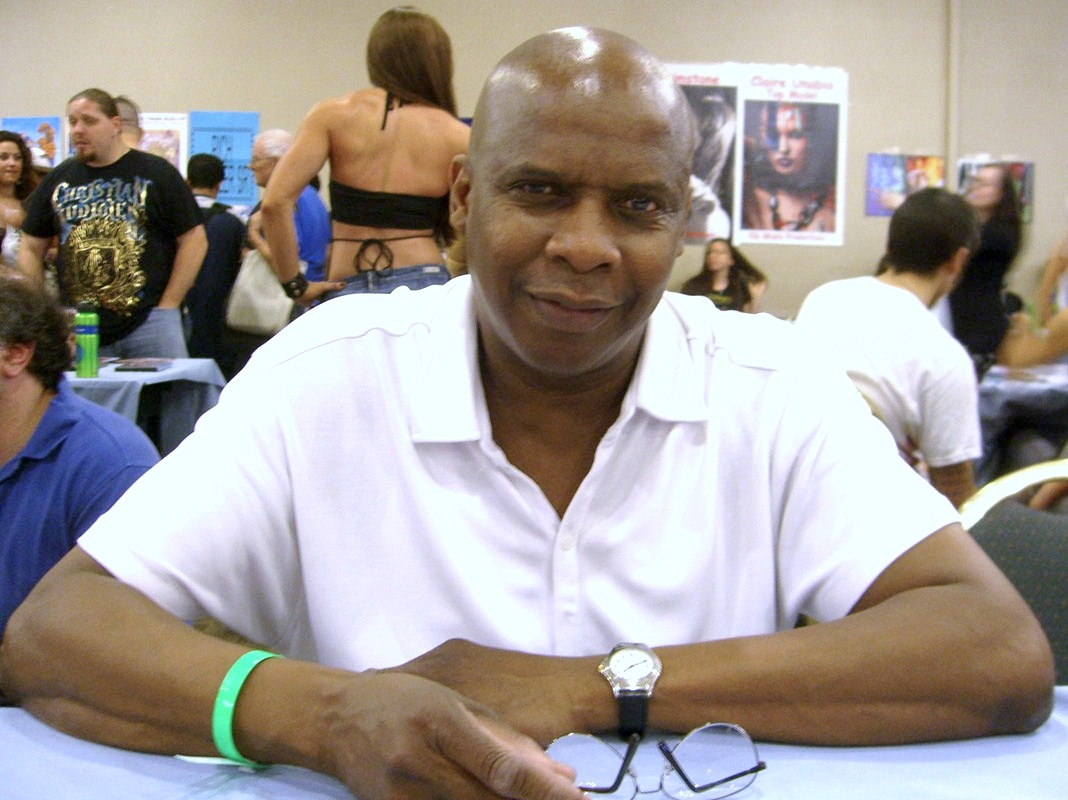
- Harris in 2009
- Born: David Dominic Harris; June 18, 1949; New York City, U.S.
- Died: October 25, 2024 (aged 75); New York City, U.S.
- Other names: David D. Harris
- Occupation: Actor
- Years active: 1976–2019
- Children: 1

David Dominic Harris (June 18, 1949 – October 25, 2024) was an American television and film actor, most notable for his portrayal of Cochise, a young gang member, in the 1979 film The Warriors. He appeared as a supporting actor in a number of films and television series, and commonly played police officers and military personnel.

== Life and career ==
David Dominic Harris was born in New York City on June 18, 1949, and attended the High School of Performing Arts. His first role came in the 1976 television film Judge Horton and the Scottsboro Boys, in which he co-starred as Haywood Patterson. He followed this up with a number of supporting roles until 1979, when he appeared as Cochise in The Warriors, the role for which he is best remembered. He also appeared in the Robert Redford film Brubaker the following year. Throughout the 1980s, he appeared in a number of fairly high-profile films, and in the 1990s, he did mostly television work. He lent his voice to The Warriors video game in 2005, reprising his role as Cochise. In 2012, he appeared in Law & Order: Special Victims Unit as Warden.

Harris had a daughter and two grandchildren. He died from cancer at home in New York City, on October 25, 2024, at the age of 75.

== Filmography ==
=== Film ===
David Harris film credits
Year	Title	Role	Notes
1979	The Warriors	'Cochise'	
1980	Brubaker	Duane Spivey	
1984	Purple Hearts	Hanes	
1984	A Soldier's Story	Private Smalls	
1986	Quicksilver	'Apache'	
1986	Fire with Fire	Ben Halsey	
1987	Fatal Beauty	Raphael	
1987	Under Cover	Lucas	
1988	Dead End City	Brad Bright	
1990	Operation Warzone	Colonel Harker	
1997	Black Scorpion II: Aftershock	Heckler	
1997	Form, Space & Murder	Construction Worker	Short film
2000	Dish Dogs	Shane	
2013	Maniac	Deli Owner	Short film
2014	Straight	The Dealer	Short film
2015	The Warriors: Last Subway Ride Home	'Cochise'	Video
2015	James White	Joe	
2016	Mommy's Box	C.C. 'Pop' Nevins	
2016	His Dying Wish	Walt Harper	Final film role

=== Television ===
David Harris television credits
Year	Title	Role	Notes
1976	Judge Horton and the Scottsboro Boys	Haywood Patterson	Television film
1977	Kojak	Bucky Norris	Episode: "The Godson"
1977	Secret Service	Jonas	Television film
1979	The White Shadow	Rollo	Episode: "Needle"
1980	Death Penalty	Claudell	Television film
1980	Attica	T.J.	Television film
1982	Benny's Place	Ricky 'Ricky T'	Television film
1984–1986	Hill Street Blues	Darnell Karns / Bumphus	2 episodes
1985	Badge of the Assassin	Lester Bertram Day	Television film
1985	North and South	Priam	Television miniseries
1986	MacGyver	Luther	Episode: "Final Approach"
1987	Vietnam War Story	Harris	Episode: "Home"
1988	Crime Story	Henchman	2 episodes
1988	In the Heat of the Night	Willy Jones	2 episodes
1988	Simon & Simon	Travis Reese	Episode: "Little Boy Dead"
1989	The Equalizer	Hammer	Episode: "Suicide Squad"
1990	Cop Rock	Nelson Pine	Episode: "Pilot"
1991	Equal Justice	Antoine Adams	Episode: "End Game"
1992–2001	NYPD Blue	Officer Donny Simmons	16 episodes
1993	Father & Son: Dangerous Relations	Mario	Television film
1994	In the Line of Duty: The Price of Vengeance	Unknown	Television film
1995	Favorite Deadly Sins	Robber #1	Television film
1997	Mike Hammer, Private Eye	Detective Artie Ushry	Episode: "Halloween"
1997	Profiler	Detective Marcel Roubidoux	Episode: "It Cuts Both Ways"
1998	Pensacola: Wings of Gold	Colonel LaCombe	Episode: "Soldiers of Misfortune"
1999	Martial Law	Arthur	Episode: "Captive Hearts"
2000	Any Day Now	Unknown	Episode: "Homegirl"
2000	ER	Fulton's Son	Episode: "Loose Ends"
2001	18 Wheels of Justice	Detective Lamont	Episode: "Crossing the Line"
2001	Philly	Man #3	Episode: "Loving Sons"
2012	Law & Order: Special Victims Unit	Warden	Episode: "Justice Denied"
2014	Elementary	Custodian	Episode: "The Adventure of the Nutmeg Concoction"
2018	Instinct	Building Super	Episode: "Secrets and Lies"
2019	First Wives Club	Uncle Bepop	Episode: "Vengeance"; Final television appearance

=== Video games ===
Year	Title	Role	Notes
2005	The Warriors	'Cochise'	
