= Laura Johnson =

American actress

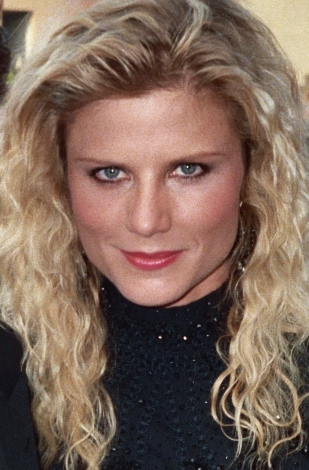
- Johnson in 1987
- Born: Burbank, California, U.S.
- Occupation: Actress
- Years active: 1977–present
- Spouses: David Solomon (divorced) Harry Hamlin (m. 1985; div. 1989)

Laura Johnson is an American actress. She is best known for playing Terry Hartford in the CBS primetime soap opera Falcon Crest from 1983 to 1986.

== Career ==
Johnson made her film debut in the 1977 drama film Opening Night directed by John Cassavetes and starring Gena Rowlands. From 1979 to 1980, she had a recurring role as Betty Lou Barker in the CBS prime time soap opera Dallas. In 1983, she was cast as Terry Hartford in another CBS prime time soap opera, Falcon Crest playing this role to 1986. In 1986, she received a Soap Opera Digest Award nomination for Outstanding Villainess on a Prime Time Serial.

Johnson appeared in a number of movies, include Beyond Reason (1985), Wes Craven's Chiller (1985), Fatal Instinct (1992), Trauma (1993), Deadly Exposure (1993), Four Christmases (2008) and Fame (2009). From 1988 to 1989, she played one of leads in the ABC medical drama series Heartbeat produced by Aaron Spelling. From 1998 to 1999, she played a leading role in the syndicated television family drama Born Free. Johnson also guest starred in a number of shows, include Hotel, L.A. Law, In the Heat of the Night, Nash Bridges, Strong Medicine and Monk.

== Personal life ==
Johnson was born in Burbank, California. She was first married to producer David Solomon, and then to actor Harry Hamlin from 1985 to 1989.

== Filmography ==
- Opening Night (1977) as Nancy Stein
- Beyond Reason (1977) as Leslie Valentine
- Dallas as Betty Lou (3 episodes, 1979-1980)
- Fly Away Home (1981) as Chickie
- Hotel as Natasha Cellini (1 episode, 1985)
- Wes Craven's Chiller (1985) as Leigh Kenyon (TV movie)
- Falcon Crest as Terry Hartford Ranson Channing (80 episodes, 1983–1986)
- L.A. Law as Nina Hollender (2 episodes, 1987)
- Red River (1988) as Kate
- Heartbeat as Dr. Eve Autrey (18 episodes, 1988–1989)
- Nick Knight (1989) as Dr. Alyce Hunter
- Jake and the Fatman as Ms. Amelie Saint-John (episode "More than you know", 1990)
- Murderous Vision (1991) as Elizabeth
- Red Shoe Diaries (1992) episode "Double Dare"
- Fatal Instinct a.k.a. To Kill For (1992) as Catherine Merrims
- Trauma (1993) as Grace Harrington
- Paper Hearts (1993) as Patsy
- Deadly Exposure (1993) as Rita Sullivan
- Hunt for the Blue Diamond (1993) as Wendy Hill
- Marked for Murder (1993) as Dr. Jean Horton
- Awake to Danger (1995) as Renee McAdams
- Judge and Jury (1996) as Grace Silvano
- Mr. Atlas (1997) as Teddie Nielsen
- Born Free as Kate McQueen (25 episodes, 1998–1999)
- And the Beat Goes On (1999) as Georgia LaPierre
- California Myth (1999) as Angie
- Nash Bridges as Simon/Darlene Peck (1 episode, 2000)
- Hope Ranch (2002) as Sam Brooks
- Strong Medicine as Claudia Chase (1 episode, 2002)
- JAG as Mrs. Kubin (1 episode, 2003)
- The Long Shot (2004) as Bonnie McCloud
- The Hollywood Mom's Mystery (2004) as Francine Palumbo
- Red Eye (2005) as Debbie
- Cold Case as Rita Hart (1 episode, 2006)
- Without a Trace as Kim Wolfe (1 episode, 2006)
- Four Christmases (2008) as Cheryl
- Fame (2009) as Mrs. Ellerton
- The Storm as Anne Cambridge (1 episode, 2009)
- Monk as Carolyn Buxton (1 episode, 2009)
- Mental as Georgia Riede (1 episode, 2009)
