= The Warriors (film) =

1979 American action thriller film by Walter Hill

- Theatrical release poster
- Directed by: Walter Hill
- Screenplay by: David Shaber; Walter Hill
- Based on: The Warriors by Sol Yurick
- Produced by: Lawrence Gordon
- Starring: Michael Beck; James Remar; Deborah Van Valkenburgh; Marcelino Sánchez; David Harris; Tom McKitterick; Brian Tyler; Dorsey Wright; Terry Michos; David Patrick Kelly; Roger Hill; Edward Sewer; Lynne Thigpen
- Cinematography: Andrew Laszlo
- Edited by: David Holden; Freeman Davies Jr.; Billy Weber; Susan E. Morse
- Music by: Barry De Vorzon
- Production company: Lawrence Gordon Productions
- Distributed by: Paramount Pictures
- Release date: February 9, 1979 (United States)
- Running time: 92 minutes
- Country: United States
- Language: English
- Budget: $4 million
- Box office: $22.5 million

The Warriors is a 1979 American action thriller film directed by Walter Hill, who co-wrote the screenplay with David Shaber, based on the 1965 novel of the same name by Sol Yurick. The film features an ensemble cast which includes Michael Beck, James Remar, Deborah Van Valkenburgh, Marcelino Sánchez, David Harris, Tom McKitterick, Brian Tyler, Dorsey Wright, Terry Michos, David Patrick Kelly, Roger Hill, Edward Sewer, and Lynne Thigpen. In the film, a street gang must escape from the Bronx back to their home turf on Coney Island after being framed for the murder of a respected gang leader.

Development on The Warriors initially began in 1969 after American International Pictures purchased the film rights to Yurick's novel, but production stalled until producer Lawrence Gordon obtained the rights and commissioned Shaber and Hill to work on the screenplay. Originally envisioned as a western, the novel was ultimately adapted as a stylized action thriller. Casting was extensive and production was troubled, with Hill clashing with some of the actors and going over budget. Principal photography took place in 1978 on location across New York City, including at Astoria Studios.

The Warriors was theatrically released in the United States on February 9, 1979, by Paramount Pictures. It grossed $22.5 million worldwide and received negative reviews from critics for its lack of realism and dialogue. Initial screenings of the film were linked to vandalism and murders, prompting Paramount to halt advertising or release theaters from their obligation to screen the film. The Warriors has been reappraised by critics and is considered a cult film. It has since launched a franchise which spawned several spinoffs, including video games, a comic book series, and an upcoming Broadway musical.

== Plot ==
Cyrus, charismatic leader of the Gramercy Riffs, the most powerful gang in New York City, requests that 100 of the city's gangs each send nine unarmed delegates to Van Cortlandt Park for a midnight summit. The Warriors, a gang from Coney Island, send a delegation consisting of "warlord" (leader) Cleon; "war chief" (second-in-command) Swan; enforcer Ajax; scout Fox; graffiti artist Rembrandt; music man Snow; bearer Vermin, and soldiers Cowboy and Cochise. Cyrus proposes a citywide truce and alliance to the assembled crowd, allowing the gangs to control the city together since they collectively outnumber the police three to one.

Most of the gang members applaud this idea, but Luther, the unbalanced and sadistic leader of the Rogues, shoots Cyrus dead in the midst of his speech. Luther realizes that Fox witnessed his actions, but before he can shoot Fox as well, the NYPD arrives to break up the meeting and Luther is temporarily blinded by the bright lights the NYPD uses to stun the crowd, allowing Fox to escape. In order to prevent Fox from turning him in, Luther falsely accuses the Warriors of killing Cyrus. Cleon denies the assassination, but he is viciously attacked and killed by the vengeful Riffs. Meanwhile, the other Warriors escape to Woodlawn Cemetery, unaware that they have been implicated in Cyrus's killing. As Cleon's second-in-command, Swan takes charge of the group. Ajax tries to challenge him for control, but backs down when the rest of the gang support Swan. Masai, Cyrus's second-in-command in the Riffs, puts out a "dead or alive" bounty on the Warriors through a radio DJ.

The Turnbull ACs spot the Warriors and try to run them down with a modified school bus, but the Warriors outrun them and board the MTA New York City Subway. On the ride to Coney Island, the train is stopped by a building fire alongside the tracks, stranding the Warriors in Tremont. Setting out on foot, they encounter the Orphans, who are insecure about their lowly status as they were excluded from Cyrus's meeting. Swan and Fox try to negotiate with the Orphans' leader Sully, but Sully's girlfriend, Mercy, instigates a confrontation. Swan throws a Molotov cocktail, and the Warriors run to the nearest subway station, bringing Mercy with them in the confusion.

When the group arrives at the 96th Street and Broadway subway station in Manhattan, they are pursued by cops and separated. Vermin, Cochise, and Rembrandt escape by boarding a subway car. Fox, struggling with a police officer, is thrown onto the tracks and killed by a passing train as Mercy flees the scene. The Baseball Furies chase Swan, Ajax, Snow, and Cowboy into Riverside Park, but they are defeated in a brawl. After the fight, Ajax sees a lone woman sitting on a park bench and leaves the group despite Swan's objections. When Ajax becomes sexually aggressive, the woman reveals herself as an undercover cop and arrests him with the help of uniformed officers.

Upon arriving at Union Square station, Vermin, Cochise, and Rembrandt are seduced by an all-female gang called the Lizzies and invited into their hideout. They narrowly escape the Lizzies' subsequent attack, learning in the process that the gangland community and the police believe the Warriors murdered Cyrus. As a lone scout, Swan returns to the 96th Street station, where Mercy joins him (although he spurns her advances). After reaching the Union Square station by walking along the tracks, they reunite with the remaining Warriors and fight with an overalls-wearing roller skating gang, the Punks, which allows Mercy to prove herself in combat. Swan picks up a switchblade dropped by the leader of the Punks. Meanwhile, an unidentified gang member visits the Riffs and reveals the truth that the Warriors are innocent and Luther was the one who shot Cyrus.

At dawn, the Warriors finally reach Coney Island, only to find Luther and the Rogues waiting for them. Swan asks Luther why he killed Cyrus, to which Luther replies, "No reason... I just like doing things like that!" Swan challenges Luther to single combat, but Luther draws the same revolver he used to kill Cyrus, insisting "you're dead!" Swan dodges his shot and throws a switchblade into Luther's forearm, instantly disarming him and causing him to kneel on the ground and whine in pain. The Riffs arrive and acknowledge the Warriors' innocence of Cyrus' murder, as well as saluting their courage and skill. The Riffs let the Warriors leave before descending on the Rogues and Luther, who screams in anguish at his imminent demise. The radio DJ announces that the bounty on the Warriors has been cancelled and salutes them with a song, "In the City." The film ends with Swan, Mercy, and the rest of the gang walking down a Coney Island beach illuminated by the rising sun.

== Cast ==
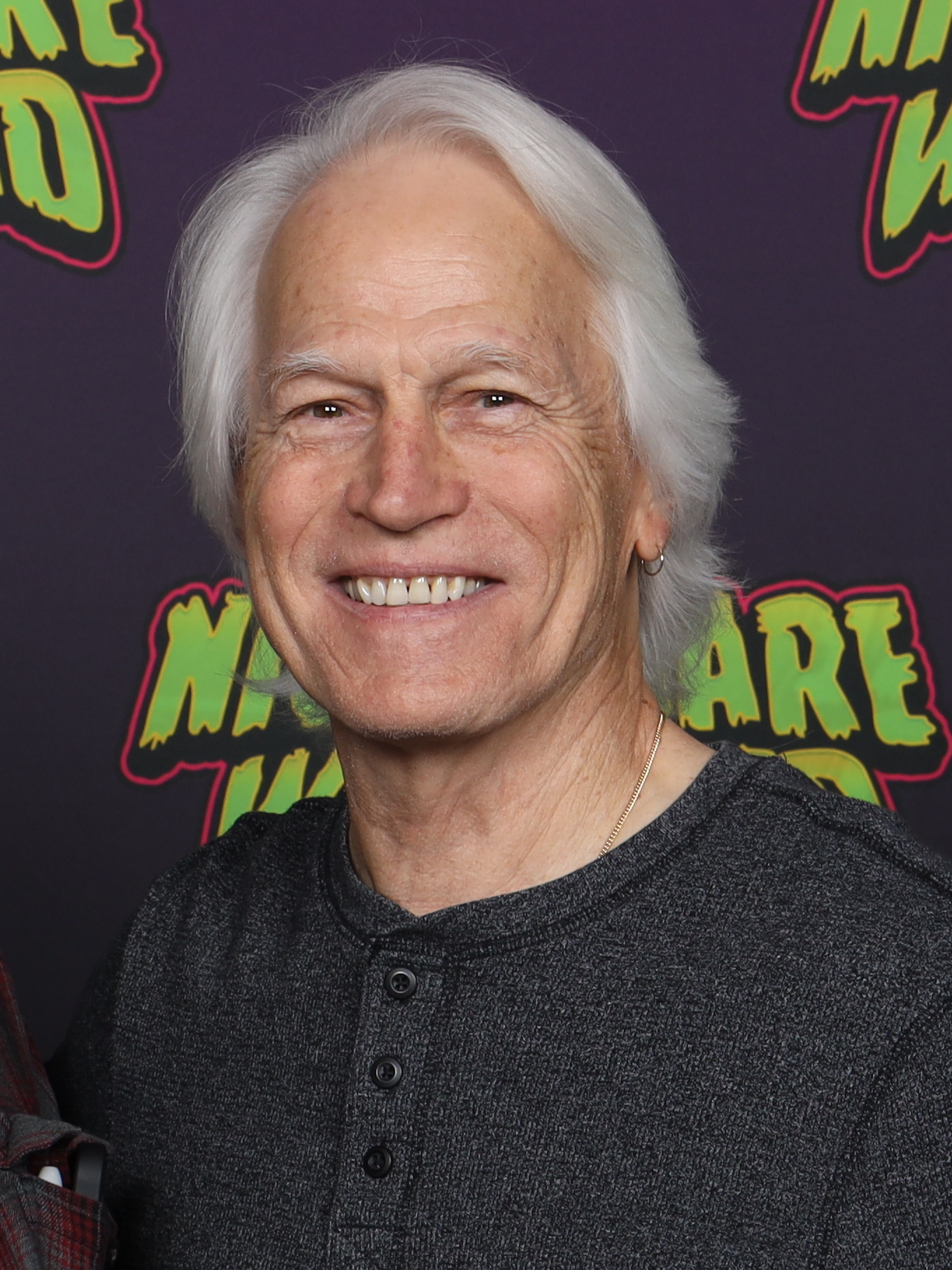
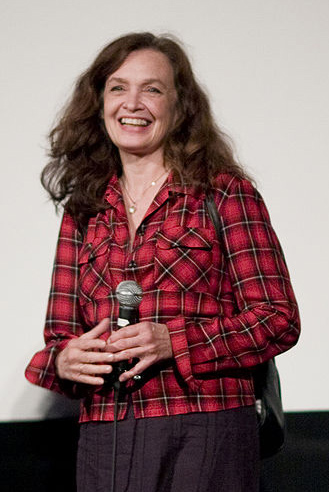
Michael Beck and Deborah Van Valkenburgh, who played Swan and Mercy, respectively
- Michael Beck as Swan, the second-in-command and interim War Chief of the Warriors
- James Remar as Ajax, the vulgar mouthy enforcer of the Warriors
- Deborah Van Valkenburgh as Mercy, girlfriend of the Orphans leader who accompanies the Warriors to Coney Island
- Marcelino Sánchez as Rembrandt, the youngest member and Graffiti Artist of the Warriors
- David Harris as Cochise, a member of the Warriors who sports Native American gear
- Tom McKitterick as Cowboy, a member of the Warriors who wears a cowboy hat
- Brian Tyler as Snow, an enforcer of the Warriors with a taste for music
- Dorsey Wright as Cleon, War Chieftain and leader of the Warriors
- Terry Michos as Vermin, a member of the Warriors who is identified in a deleted scene as the bearer, the person who carries the group's money and subway tokens
- David Patrick Kelly as Luther, the psychotic leader of the Rogues who was responsible for Cyrus's assassination and who clicks empty bottles together to taunt The Warriors while repeating "Warriors - come out to play-ee-eh..."
- Roger Hill as Cyrus, leader of the Gramercy Riffs and host of the Van Cortlandt Summit
- Edward Sewer as Masai, second-in-command of the Gramercy Riffs who personally trains the gang members (Note: The credits incorrectly identify Gregory as Masai and Sewer as an unnamed Gramercy Riff.)
- Lynne Thigpen as the D.J.
- Thomas G. Waites as Fox, the Scout for the Warriors (Note: Waites was uncredited at his request.)

Featured as gang leaders in the film are Paul Greco as Sully, the leader of the Orphans, Jery Hewitt as Cobb, the leader of the Baseball Furies, Kate Klugman as Starr, the leader of the Lizzies, and Konrad Sheehan as Vance, the roller skating leader of the Punks. Apache Ramos portrayed Jesse, the main lieutenant of the Orphans. Stunt coordinator and future director Craig R. Baxley appears as a member of the Punks, as does stuntman A.J. Bakunas, who was killed on the set of the movie Steel before the film's release. Steve James and Bill Anagnos portray Baseball Furies, while Dennis Gregory portrays a Gramercy Riff. Mercedes Ruehl plays the policewoman who arrests Ajax, with Irwin Keyes and Sonny Landham also appearing as police officers. Ginny Ortiz portrays the candy store employee whom the Rogues steal from and John Snyder portrays a gas station worker. In a pre credits scene deleted from the theatrical version but reinstated in television broadcasts, Pamela Poitier (a daughter of Sidney Poitier) portrays Lincoln, Cleon's girlfriend.

== Production ==
=== Development ===
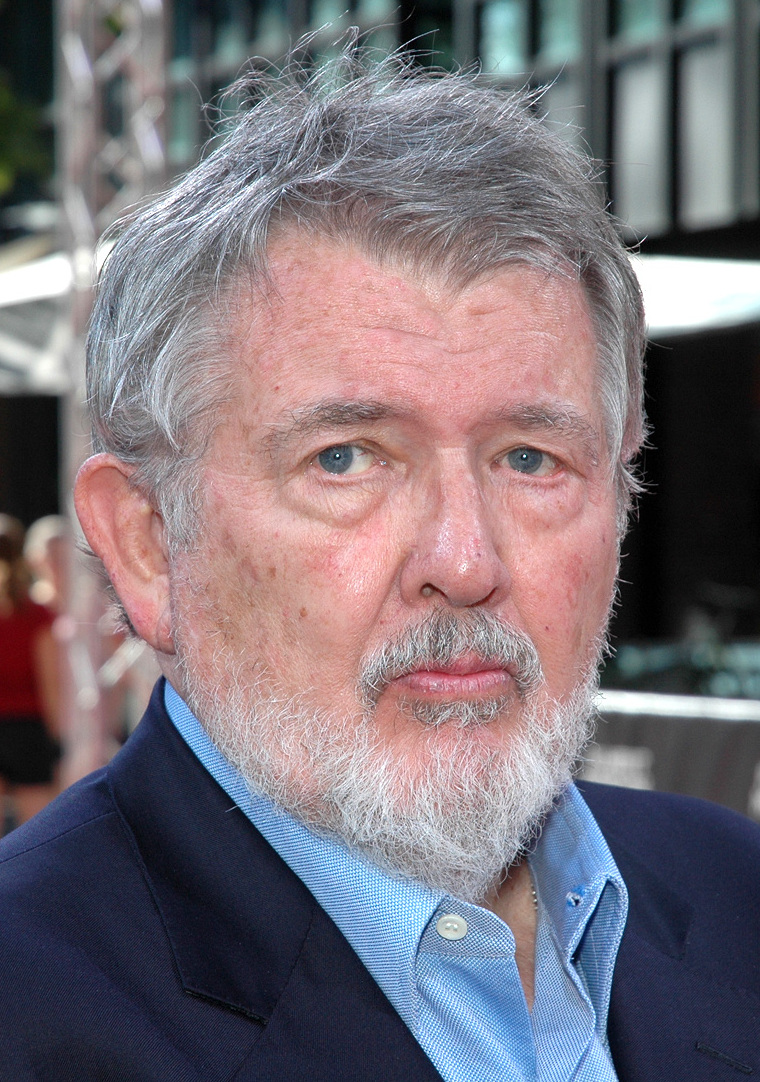
Walter Hill, director and co-writer of The Warriors (pictured in 2014)

The film is based on Sol Yurick's 1965 novel The Warriors, which was, in turn, based on Xenophon's Anabasis. Film rights were bought in 1969 by American International Pictures but no film resulted.

Rights were then obtained by producer Lawrence Gordon who commissioned David Shaber to write a script. Gordon had made Hard Times (1975) and The Driver (1978) with Walter Hill; he sent the script to Hill with a copy of Sol Yurick's novel. Hill recalls, "I said 'Larry, I would love to do this, but nobody will let us do it.' It was going to be too extreme and too weird."

Gordon and Hill were originally going to make a western but when the financing on the project failed to materialize, they took The Warriors to Paramount Pictures because they were interested in youth films at the time and succeeded in getting the project financed. Hill remembers "it came together very quickly. Larry had a special relationship with Paramount and we promised to make the movie very cheaply, which we did. So it came together within a matter of weeks. I think we got the green light in April or May 1978 and we were in theaters in February 1979. So it was a very accelerated process."

Hill was drawn to the "extreme narrative simplicity and stripped down quality of the script". The script, as written, was a realistic take on street gangs but Hill was a huge fan of comic books and wanted to divide the film into chapters and then have each chapter "come to life starting with a splash panel". However, Hill was working on a low budget and a tight post-production schedule because of a fixed release date as the studio wanted to release The Warriors before a rival gang picture called The Wanderers. Hill was finally able to include this type of scene transition in the Ultimate Director's Cut released for home video in 2005.

=== Casting ===
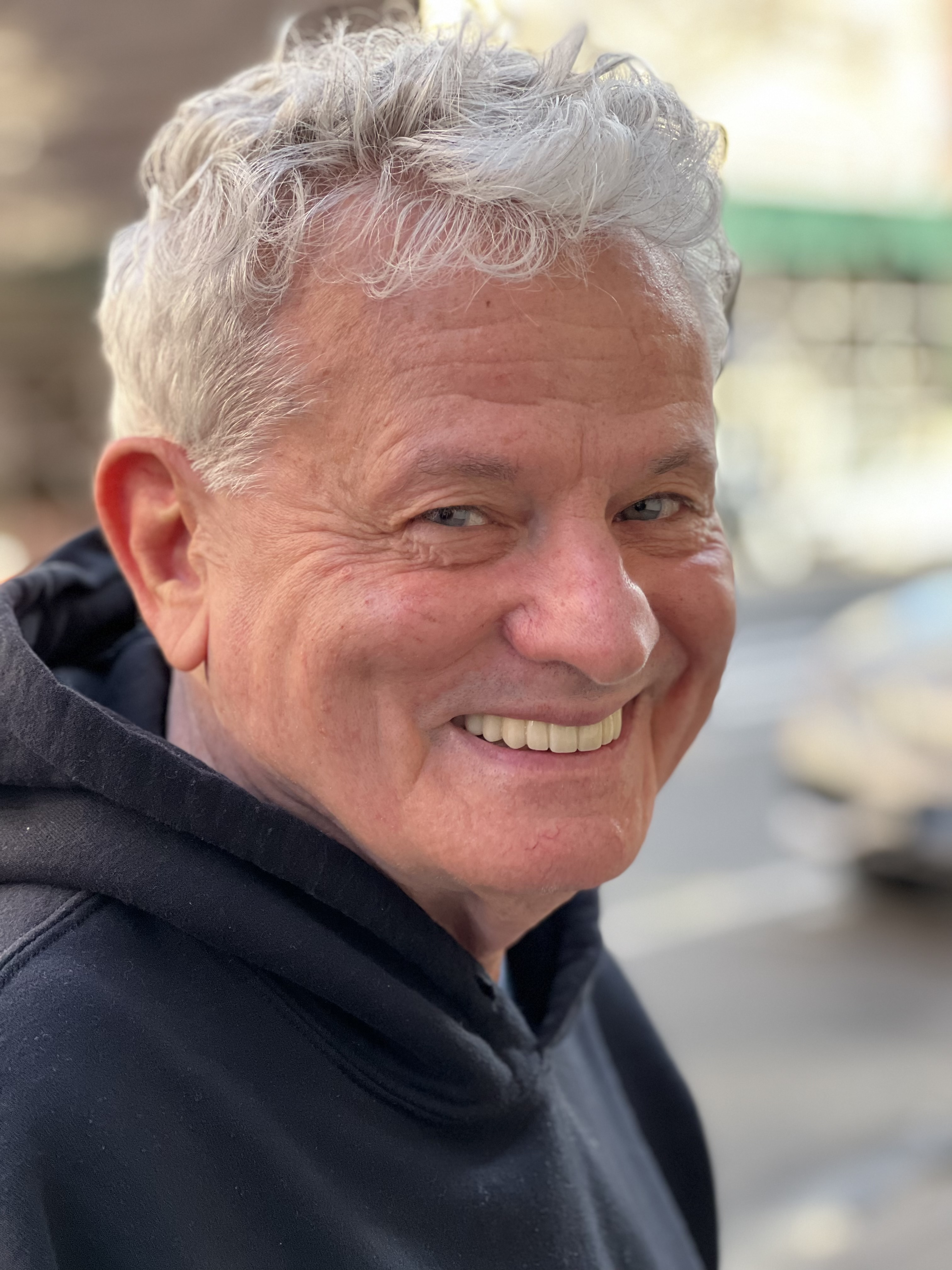
Thomas G. Waites, who portrayed Fox before being fired during production (pictured in 2022)

The filmmakers did extensive casting in New York City. Hill was considering hiring Sigourney Weaver from Alien and watched a movie she had filmed in Israel called Madman where the male lead opposite Weaver was played by Michael Beck. The director was impressed with Beck's performance and cast him in The Warriors. Hill initially wanted a Puerto Rican actress for the role of Mercy, but Deborah Van Valkenburgh's agent convinced the film's casting directors to see her and she was eventually cast. The filmmakers wanted to cast Tony Danza in the role of Vermin but he was cast in the sitcom Taxi and Terry Michos was cast instead. While there were white characters in Yurick's book, none of the central characters or protagonists were white: according to Hill, Paramount did not want an all-black cast for "commercial reasons".

Hill saw Thomas G. Waites as the next James Dean, and the director "invited the young actor to the Gulf and Western to watch movies like Rebel Without a Cause and East of Eden for inspiration." During the screening, Hill offered Waites a drink, which Waites refused, resulting in a rift between the two that grew worse during the grueling summer shoot. At one point, Waites threatened to report the working conditions to the Screen Actors Guild, forcing Paramount to provide a second trailer for the eight Warriors to share.

Finally, eight weeks into principal photography, when the tension on set between Waites and Hill reached the breaking point, Hill demanded that stunt coordinator Craig Baxley improvise a stunt scene in which Waites' character would be killed. "Stunned, Baxley demurred. Such a critical scene would take careful planning. But Hill was insistent. 'I don't give a shit how you kill him,' Baxley recalls the director saying. 'Kill him.'" Baxley found a crew member who resembled Waites and staged a scene in which the character is thrown off a subway platform in front of an approaching train. "It was like someone cut my soul out and left a shell", Waites remembers. He would later demand that his name be removed from the cast altogether; he remains uncredited to this day. Both Waites and Hill have expressed regret over how the situation was handled and since made up.

=== Filming ===
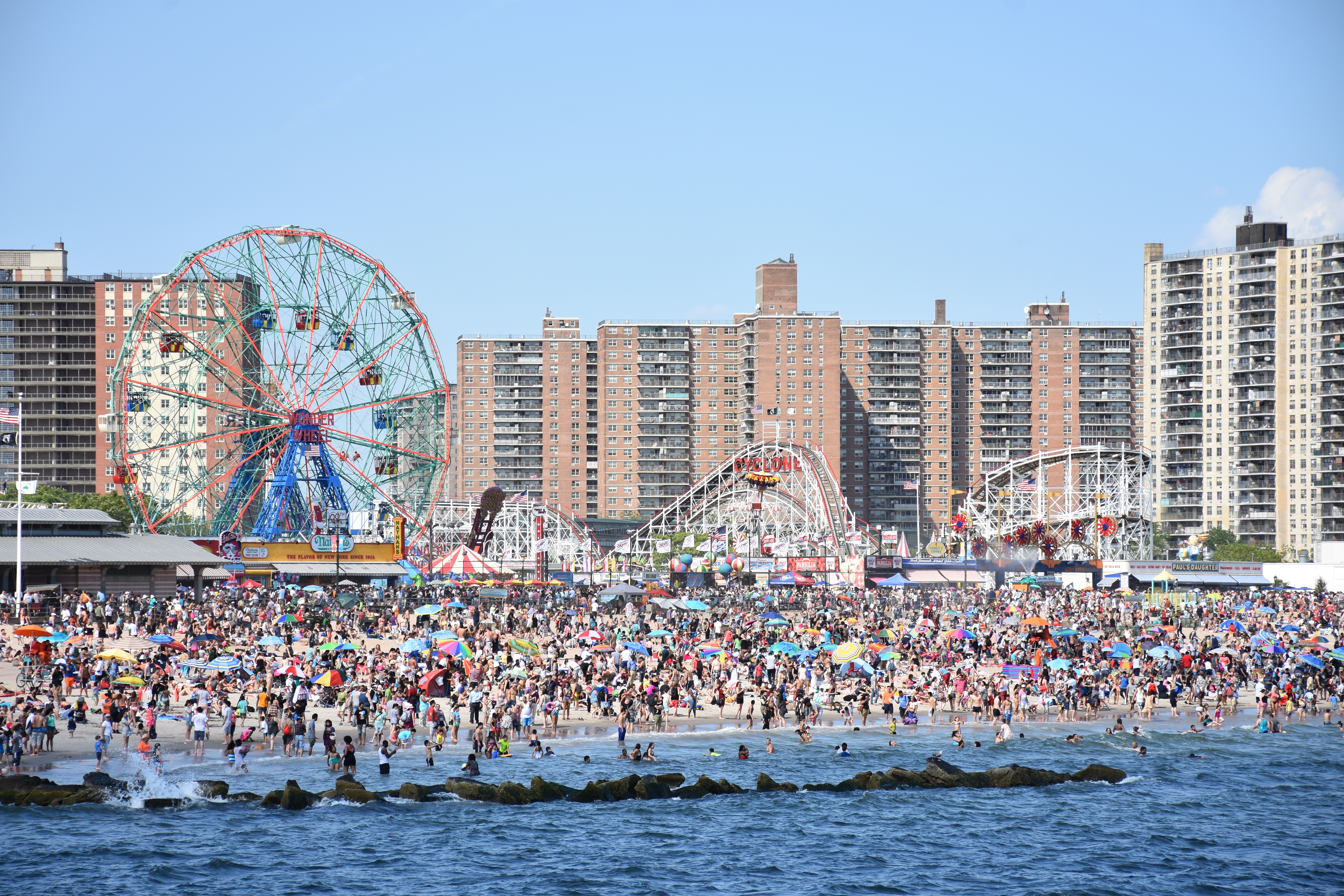
Scenes from the film were shot in Coney Island (pictured in 2016).

Stunt coordinator Craig R. Baxley put the cast through stunt school because Hill wanted realistic fights depicted in the film. In preparation for his role, James Remar hung out at Coney Island to find a model for his character. The entire film was shot on the streets in New York City with some interior scenes done at Astoria Studios. They would shoot from sundown to sunrise. The film quickly fell behind schedule and went over budget. Although the Conclave scene at the beginning was supposed to be in The Bronx, it was actually filmed in Riverside Park in Manhattan. The bathroom fight scene against The Punks was shot in a studio. The entire movie was only filmed in Manhattan, Brooklyn and Queens. Actor Joel Weiss remembers that filming of his scene on Avenue A, in Manhattan's notorious Alphabet City, was canceled because there was a double homicide nearby. For the big meeting at the beginning of the film, Hill wanted real gang members in the scene with off duty police officers also in the crowd so that there would be no trouble.

The studio would not allow Baxley to bring any stunt men from Hollywood and he needed someone to double for the character of Cyrus so he did the stunt himself dressed as the character. Real gang members sometimes approached the set to challenge the cast members but were stopped, sometimes violently, by production security. The actors playing the Warriors bonded early in the shoot, on and off the set. Originally, the character of Fox was supposed to end up with Mercy, while Swan was captured by a rival, homosexual gang known as the Dingos, only to escape later. However, Hill watched the dailies and felt that Beck and Van Valkenburgh had great chemistry; the script was rewritten so that their characters ended up together.

The Rogues' car in the Coney Island confrontation was a 1955 Cadillac hearse. Hill was underwhelmed by the script's depiction of Luther taunting the Warriors, and asked actor David Patrick Kelly for ideas. Kelly first proposed using two dead pigeons, which was rejected as Hill was unconvinced that it would work. While Hill left to adjust some cameras, Kelly went under the boardwalk and emerged with some discarded beer bottles: when Hill returned to the car to ask what he had come up with, Kelly clinked the bottles together with his fingers and delivered the now-iconic line, "Warriors, come out to play." Hill immediately declared, "Go with that. Don't change it. Let's shoot." Kelly recalls his improvisation was inspired by something said to him by his then-next door neighbor, a man he suspects of having been a gangster and whose voice he also drew from for the line.

Hill wanted Orson Welles to do a narrated introduction about Greek themes but the studio did not like this idea and refused to pay for it. However this sequence was finally included in the 2005 Ultimate Director's Cut, with Hill providing the narration himself. "I wanted to take it into a fantasy element, but at the same time add some contemporary flash", said Hill. "Those were some of the hard ideas we had to get the studio to understand. But we did not get along very well with our parent company. After the movie came out and it did well, everybody was sort of friends. But up until then there was a lot of misunderstanding. They thought it was going to be Saturday Night Fever or something."

== Release ==
=== Theatrical run ===
On February 9, 1979 (47 years ago), The Warriors opened in 670 theaters, without advance screenings or a decent promotional campaign, but still grossed US$3.5 million on its opening weekend (equivalent to $16 million in 2025).

=== Controversy ===
The following weekend, the film was linked to sporadic outbreaks of vandalism and three killings—two in Southern California and one in Boston—involving moviegoers on their way to or from showings.

Paramount was prompted to remove advertisements from radio and television completely and display ads in the press were reduced to the film's title, rating and participating theaters. As a reaction, 200 theaters across the country added security personnel. Due to safety concerns, theater owners were relieved of their contractual obligations if they did not want to show the film, and Paramount offered to pay costs for additional security and damages due to vandalism.

Hill later remembered:

"I think the reason why there were some violent incidents is really very simple: The movie was very popular with the street gangs, especially young men, a lot of whom had very strong feelings about each other. And suddenly they all went to the movies together! They looked across the aisle and there were the guys they didn't like, so there were a lot of incidents. And also, the movie itself is rambunctious—I would certainly say that."

=== Home media ===
The film was first released on VHS in 1980, LaserDisc in 1981, and DVD in 2001. The DVD contained the theatrical cut unrestored; this release has since fallen out of print. Then, in 2005, Paramount Home Entertainment released the "Ultimate Director's Cut" DVD of The Warriors. In addition to remastered picture quality and a new 5.1 surround remixed soundtrack, the film was re-edited with a new introduction and comic book-style sequences between scenes. In July 2007, the "Ultimate Director's Cut" was released on Blu-ray and has since been available for online streaming rentals and purchases through Amazon, iTunes, Google Play, Vudu and YouTube.

The original theatrical cut is available to stream in HD on those same services and was released as a Manufactured On Demand DVD in the U.S. in March 2020 by Paramount. In May 2022, The Warriors received another release through [imprint] on Blu-ray in Australia, which included not only the "Ultimate Director's Cut", but also the theatrical version, which had not seen a Blu-ray release before. In December 2023, The Warriors was released for the first time on 4K Ultra HD Blu-ray by Arrow Video with both theatrical and director's cut included.

== Reception ==
=== Box office ===
After two weeks free of incidents, the studio expanded the display ads to take advantage of reviews from reputable critics including Pauline Kael of The New Yorker. She wrote, "The Warriors is a real moviemaker's movie: it has in visual terms the kind of impact that 'Rock Around the Clock' did behind the titles of Blackboard Jungle. The Warriors is like visual rock." At Seattle's Grand Illusion Cinema, programmer Zack Carlson remembers, "people were squeezed in, lying on the floor, cheering." By its sixth week, The Warriors had grossed $16.4 million, well above its estimated $4 million to $7 million budget.

Walter Hill reflected:

What made it a success with young people... is that for the first time somebody made a film within Hollywood, big distribution, that took the gang situation and did not present it as a social problem. Presented them as a neutral or positive aspect of their lives. As soon as you said in the old days "gang movies", it was "how do we cure the pestilence and how do we fix the social waste. We want to take these kids, make sure they go to college..." This was just a movie that conceptually was different. Accepted the idea of the gang, didn't question it. That was their lives, they functioned within that context. And the social problem wasn't "were they going to college", but "were they going to survive". It's the great Hawksian dictum, where is the drama? Will he live or die? That's the drama.

"Hollywood forgives a lot when you have a hit," he added. "I don't know what to say about it, other than the fact that it was just a gift in terms of getting it. The studio hated it, and didn't even want to release it. There was a lot of friction with management at the time. Some of it might have been my fault."

=== Critical reception ===
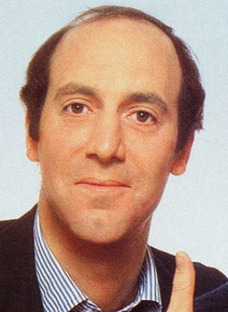
Gene Siskel,(pictured in 1982)

The Warriors received negative reviews from contemporary critics, who derided its lack of realism and found its dialogue stilted. In his review for the Chicago Sun-Times, Roger Ebert gave it two out of four stars and wrote that, despite Hill's cinematic skill, the film is implausible in a mannerist style that deprives the characters of depth and spontaneity: "No matter what impression the ads give, this isn't even remotely intended as an action film. It's a set piece. It's a ballet of stylized male violence."

However, Ebert later wrote during a review of Hill's film Southern Comfort that he felt he overlooked some positive qualities in The Warriors out of his dislike for Hill's general approach to broad characterizations. Gene Siskel gave the film one star out of four, likening the dialogue to that of "Harvey Lembeck in those silly '60s motorcycle pictures" and concluding, "You would think after watching 'The Warriors' that gang membership was a victimless crime, save for the occasional sadist who pops up as comic relief. This entire film is a romantic lie."

Linda Gross of the Los Angeles Times called the film "an insightful, stylized and shallow portrayal of gang warfare that panders to angry youthful audiences." Gary Arnold of The Washington Post wrote, "None of Hill's dynamism will save The Warriors from impressing most neutral observers as a ghastly folly." In his review for Newsweek, David Ansen wrote, "Another problem arises when the gang members open their mouths: their banal dialogue is jarringly at odds with Hill's hyperbolic visual scheme."

Frank Rich of Time wrote, "unfortunately, sheer visual zip is not enough to carry the film; it drags from one scuffle to the next ... The Warriors is not lively enough to be cheap fun or thoughtful enough to be serious." Yurick expressed his disappointment and speculated that it scared some people because "it appeals to the fear of a demonic uprising by lumpen youth", appealing to many teenagers because it "hits a series of collective fantasies." President Ronald Reagan was a fan of the film, even calling lead actor Michael Beck to tell him he had screened it at Camp David and enjoyed it.

=== Censorship ===
In France, the movie was X-rated for incitement to violence on June 25, 1979, by the Movies Control Board (Commission de contrôle des films cinématographiques, the official organization tasked with classifying films) which deemed that the work gave "a very realistic vision of the urban guerrilla warfare that gangs can develop to conquer a city." In order to allow the movie to be released in normal theaters, 10 minutes were cut, including the speech by Cleon. In 1980, the movie was finally rerated as banned for viewers under 13 and the missing scenes were finally readded. (Note: Dans la mesure où il schématise sans souci de vérité psychologique une guerre de bandes de voyous à New York, le film a cependant paru accéder à une dimension de vérité, et par elle à une portée incitative dans la mesure où il donne une vision très réaliste de la guérilla urbaine que des gangs peuvent développer pour conquérir une ville. To the extent that it schematizes a gang war between thugs in New York City without concern for psychological truth, the film nevertheless seemed to access a dimension of truth, and through it an inciting scope to the extent that it gives a very realistic vision of the urban guerrilla warfare that gangs can develop to conquer a city. — Commision de contrôle)

=== Retrospective ===
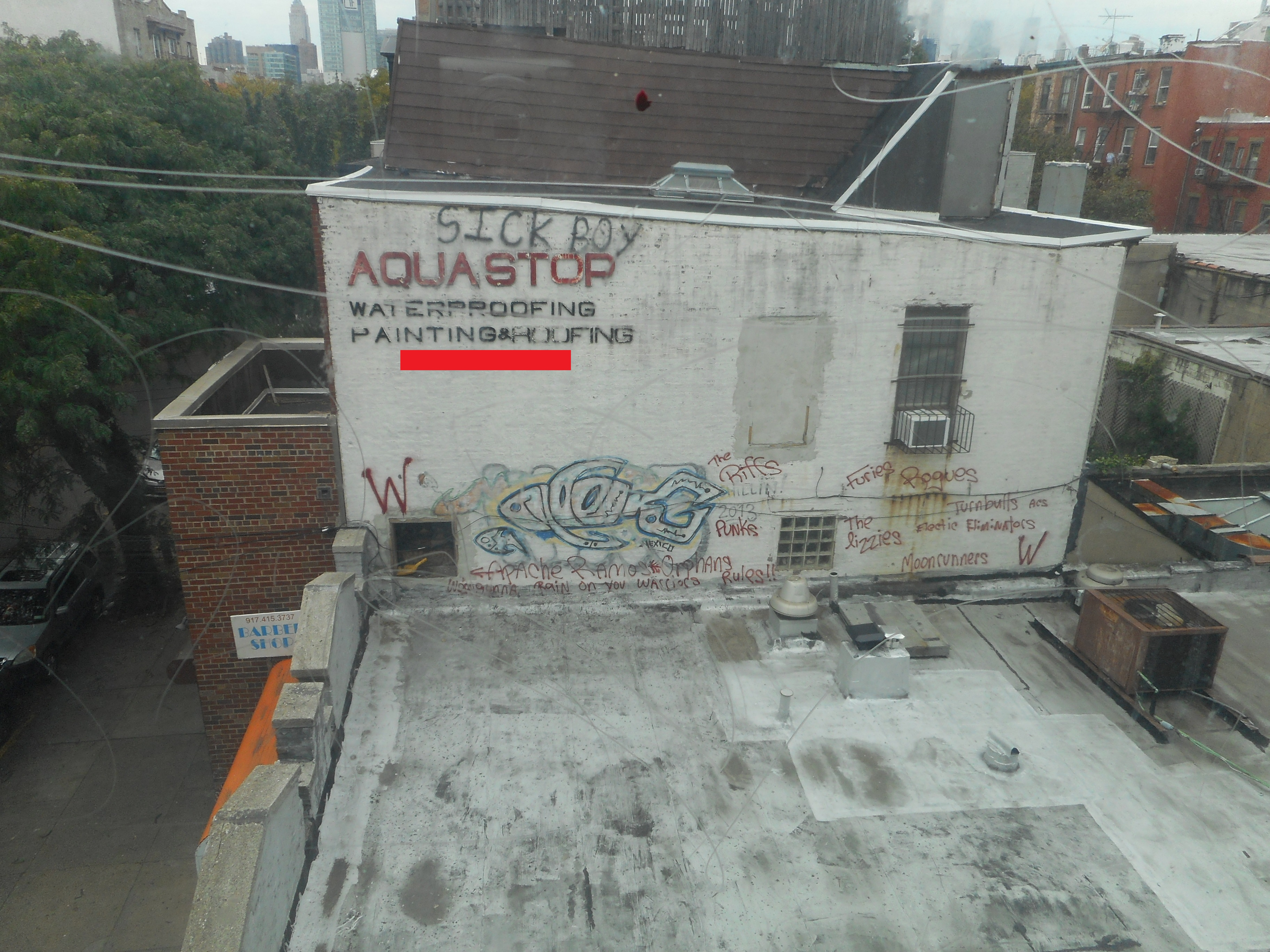
A building in Long Island City, New York, with a wall covered in graffiti with the names of the fictional gangs from the movie. This rooftop location appears in the film during the confrontation between the Warriors and the Orphans.

The Warriors has become a cult film, and some film critics have since re-examined it. As of December 2023, the film garnered an 88% approval rating at Rotten Tomatoes, based on 51 reviews. The critical consensus reads: "As violent as it is stylish, The Warriors is a thrilling piece of pulp filmmaking." Metacritic, which uses a weighted average, assigned the film a score of 65 out of 100, based on 16 critics, indicating "generally favorable" reviews.

In 2003, The New York Times placed the film on its "Best 1,000 Movies Ever Made". Entertainment Weekly named it the 16th-greatest cult film on its 2003 "Top 50 Greatest Cult Films" list, and ranked it 14th in its 2008 list of the "25 Most Controversial Movies Ever".

Hill reflected in 2016:

I love the fact that people still enjoy something I did what, 37 years ago? It makes an old man happy. I'm surprised by it. But I loved working with my cameraman Andy Laszlo in shooting it, and I loved working with my cast, who were incredibly trusting of this crazy old fucker that was making the movie. They didn't get it, I don't think—costumed gangs running around New York?—but they just went with it.

In 2018, Dante James wrote for Film Threat that few who see The Warriors can explain its longevity—other than saying, “It's just fucking cool, man!” He noted the film's enduring appeal is grounded in its gritty charm and cult energy.

In 2024, Weslee Taylor of The Scarlet wrote that the film was “a thrilling, gritty tale of brotherhood and survival,” noting that despite its early negative reviews, it had “developed a massive cult following” and was later included in The New York Times' list of the “Best 1,000 Movies Ever Made.”

== Soundtrack ==
The film's soundtrack, featuring music by Barry De Vorzon, Joe Walsh, and others, was released on the A&M label in March 1979.

== In other media ==
=== Merchandise ===
In 2005, Mezco Toyz released several action figures based on characters from the film, including Swan, Cleon, Cochise, Ajax, Luther, and a Baseball Fury.

=== Video games ===
A beat em up video game of the same name based on the film was released by Rockstar Games in October 2005. The game expands upon the story of the film, featuring 13 levels that take place before the film's events and depict the Warriors' rise to power. The final five levels directly adapt the events of the film, with only a few changes. Several of the actors from the film returned to reprise their roles. In 2005, Roger Hill (who portrayed Cyrus in the film) sued Rockstar Games and Take-Two Interactive for royalty fees, claiming the video game used his voice and depiction of his likeness without his consent or paying him royalties. Take-Two asserted its claims that the voice and likeness of Cyrus were a component of its licensing agreement for the film. Roger Hill died in 2014 with the case unresolved.

In 2009, Paramount Digital Entertainment released a beat 'em up scroller game based on the film, titled The Warriors: Street Brawl.

=== Comic books ===
In 2009, Dabel Brothers Productions published a five-issue comic book adaption of the film. In the same year, Dynamite Entertainment also published The Warriors: Jail Break, a four-issue mini series which takes place several months after the events portrayed in the film and involve the gang's attempt to break Ajax from prison.

=== Television series ===
In July 2016, Joe and Anthony Russo announced they were working with Paramount Television and Hulu for a re-imagined Warriors TV series; Frank Baldwin was signed on to write the series. In June 2018, development of the series was moved to Netflix.

=== Board game ===
The Warriors: Come Out to Play board game was published by Funko Games in 2022.

=== Stage musical and concept album ===
In August 2023, it was reported that Lin-Manuel Miranda had begun work on a stage musical adaptation of the Sol Yurick novel that provided the basis for the film. In August 2024 it was reported that the project was in fact to produce a concept album with Eisa Davis, adapted from the film. The album, Warriors, was released on 18 October 2024 and notably features a gender-swapped main cast. Original film cast members James Remar and David Patrick Kelly contributed vocals to the album, with Remar voicing the police officer who arrests Ajax, and Kelly voicing the officer who kills Fox. In December 2024, Miranda announced via an interview with The New York Times, that he, alongside Davis would be planning to adapt the well-received concept album into a full stage show. In June 2026, it was reported that the musical, Warriors, now described as being based on both the novel and the movie, would begin performances at Broadway's Lunt-Fontanne Theatre in March 2027.

== Proposed remake ==
In 2005, director Tony Scott announced plans for a remake of The Warriors, relocating the story to modern-day Los Angeles. Scott stated that the film would not feature the stylized gangs of the original, such as the Baseball Furies and Hi-Hats. Following Scott's death in 2012, filmmaker Mark Neveldine expressed interest in taking over the project, though no remake has materialized.

== See also ==
- List of cult films
- List of hood films
