= In the City (Joe Walsh song) =

1979 song performed by Joe Walsh

Song by Joe Walsh

from the album The Warriors: The Original Motion Picture Soundtrack
- Released: April 1979
- Recorded: MRI Recording (Hollywood, Los Angeles)
- Genre: Rock
- Length: 3:54
- Label: A&M
- Songwriters: Barry De Vorzon; Joe Walsh
- Producers: Barry De Vorzon; Joe Walsh

Official audio
- "In the City" on YouTube

"In the City"

Song by Eagles

from the album The Long Run
- Released: September 24, 1979
- Recorded: 1979
- Genre: Rock
- Length: 3:46
- Label: Asylum
- Songwriters: Joe Walsh; Barry De Vorzon
- Producer: Bill Szymczyk

Official audio
- "In the City" on YouTube

"In the City" is a rock song written by Barry De Vorzon and Joe Walsh. It was first recorded by Walsh and released on the soundtrack for the action thriller film The Warriors (1979). Another version of the song, recorded by the Eagles with Walsh as lead vocalist and guitarist, was included on their sixth studio album The Long Run and released the same year.

== Background ==
The track was first recorded by guitarist Joe Walsh for the soundtrack to the film The Warriors (1979). The other members of the Eagles liked what they heard and the band decided to record it for their studio album The Long Run, with Walsh continuing as lead vocalist and guitarist.

A music video made for the track features a staged recording session: Joe Walsh plays a Gibson double neck guitar using the twelve-string neck for the rhythm parts and the 6-string neck for the slide guitar parts; Timothy B. Schmit plays a Fender bass guitar; Don Felder plays a Fender Stratocaster; Don Henley uses an 8-piece Ludwig drum kit with Paiste cymbals; Glenn Frey plays piano; and Joe Vitale plays congas.

Although not released as a single, the track became an album-oriented rock radio favorite in the U.S. and a Walsh concert staple. It is also featured on the Eagles' second live album Hell Freezes Over (1994) and video; in this version, the song ends with a slower version of the guitar hook from the Beatles' 1965 song "Day Tripper".
