= Terry Michos =

American actor (born 1953)

Terence Michos
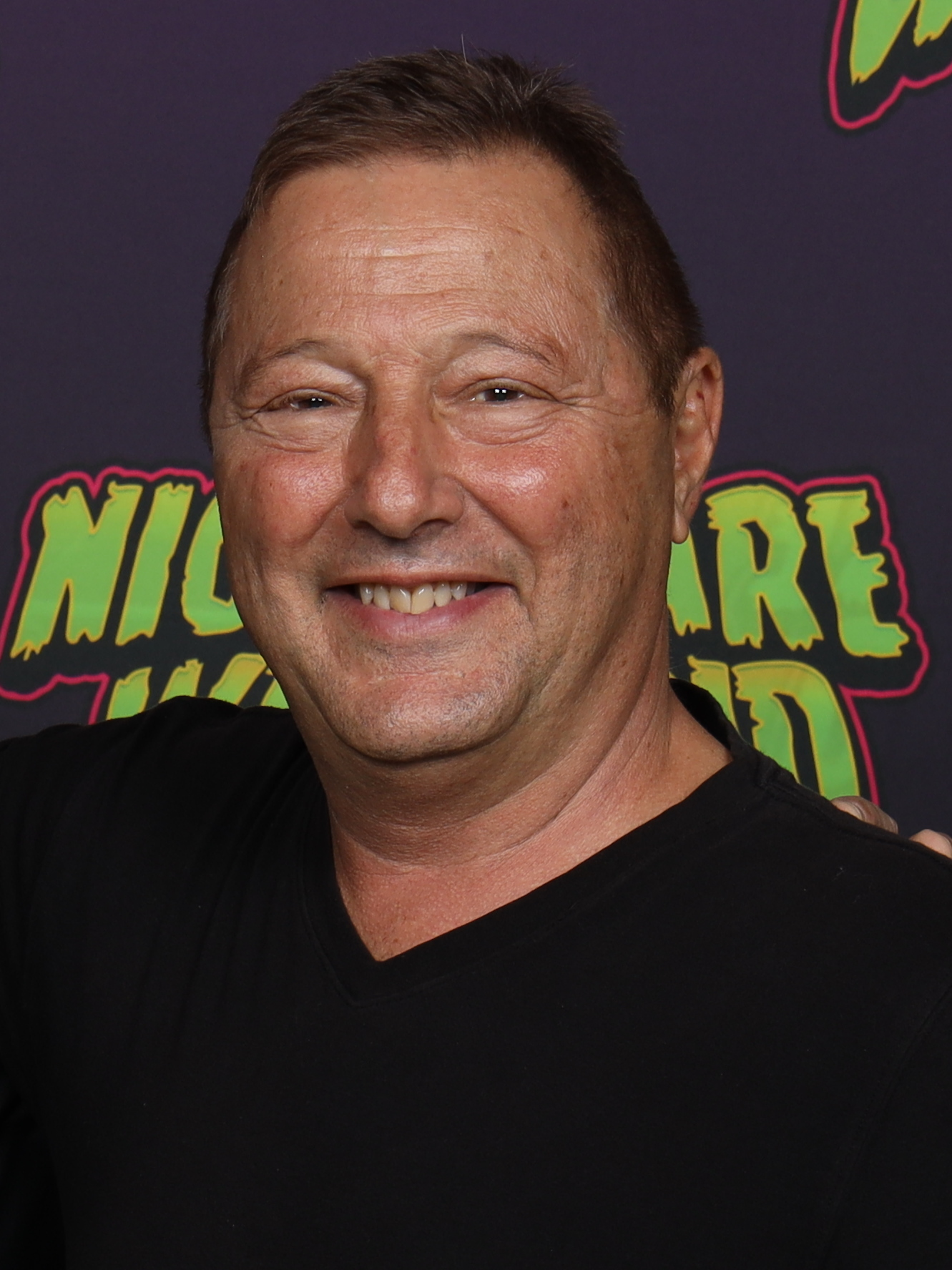
- Michos in 2024
- Born: Terence Michos; December 26, 1953 (age 72); Poughkeepsie, New York, U.S.
- Occupations: Actor, news anchor
- Years active: 1979–1983

Terence Michos (born December 26, 1953) is an American retired actor and news anchor. He is known for his role as Vermin in the 1979 film The Warriors.

== Biography ==
Michos was born in Poughkeepsie, New York. He attended the American Academy of Dramatic Arts, appearing in Line, The New York City Street Show, and Grease. Michos is best known for playing the character Vermin in the cult film The Warriors (1979). His television acting credits were in Simon & Simon (1981) and McClain's Law (1982). Terence Michos later served as a news anchor for Cablevision in Wappinger, New York. He also served as the interim senior pastor at Peekskill Assembly of God in Peekskill, New York for nine years.

== Filmography ==
Year	Title	Role	Notes
1979	The Warriors	'Vermin'	
1980	The Contender	Rick / Ric	Television miniseries
1980	The Great Skycopter Rescue	Jimmy 'Jet'	
1981	McClain's Law	Rick D'Martino	Episode: "Let the Victims Beware"
1982	Simon & Simon	Roger Fielding	Episode: "Earth to Stacey"
1983	Shout for Joy	Party Guest	
2015	The Warriors: Last Subway Ride Home	'Vermin'	Video
