= The Warriors: Street Brawl =

2009 beat 'em up scroller video game

- Developer: CXTM
- Publisher: Paramount Digital Entertainment
- Platforms: Xbox 360, Windows, macOS
- Release: NA: September 23, 2009
- Genre: Beat 'em up
- Modes: Single-player, multiplayer

The Warriors: Street Brawl is a beat 'em up scroller video game created by Latvian studio CXTM. It was released on the Mac OS X, Microsoft Windows, and Xbox 360 in September 2009. It is based on the 1979 film The Warriors, which in turn is based on the 1965 novel of the same name written by Sol Yurick.

== Gameplay ==
The Warriors: Street Brawl is a beat 'em up scroller video game with the theme, characters, and setting of The Warriors. There are several play modes, including arena boss battles and multiplayer versus fights with other Warriors. Players control members of the gang The Warriors, with a total of six playable characters: Swan, Cochise, Vermin and Rembrandt, as well as the unlockable characters Mercy and Ajax. Players are encouraged to use weapons as they battle other gangs, with weapons such as knives, bats and crowbars available for use. The Warriors: Street Brawl features seven levels with three stages, for a total of 21 missions. In the single player mode of the game, players are supported by A.I.-controlled allies. The game is also available for multiplayer, with players able to either work together in co-operative play, or battle against each other.

== Plot ==
The plot of the game is like the film. The player controls a street gang named the Warriors, leading them back to their home turf on Coney Island, after being unfairly blamed for the assassination of rival gang leader Cyrus in Van Cortlandt Park.

== Reception ==
The Warriors: Street Brawl received generally unfavourable reviews. Brett Todd of GameSpot criticized the game for its "long and dreary" campaign, "repetitive punch-ups" and "murky graphics"; however, the review also noted that fans of The Warriors film will "appreciate the settings and enemy gangs". Charles Onyett of IGN rated the game 3.3/10, classifying it as "Awful"; the review called The Warriors: Street Brawl a "poorly executed side-scrolling beat-'em up", criticising the game for its "sloppy controls, sluggish character movement, and far too little variety". On Metacritic, The Warriors: Street Brawl holds a rating of 40/100 based on 13 critics, which suggests reviews for the game are "Generally unfavourable".
