= Marcelino Sánchez =

Puerto Rican actor

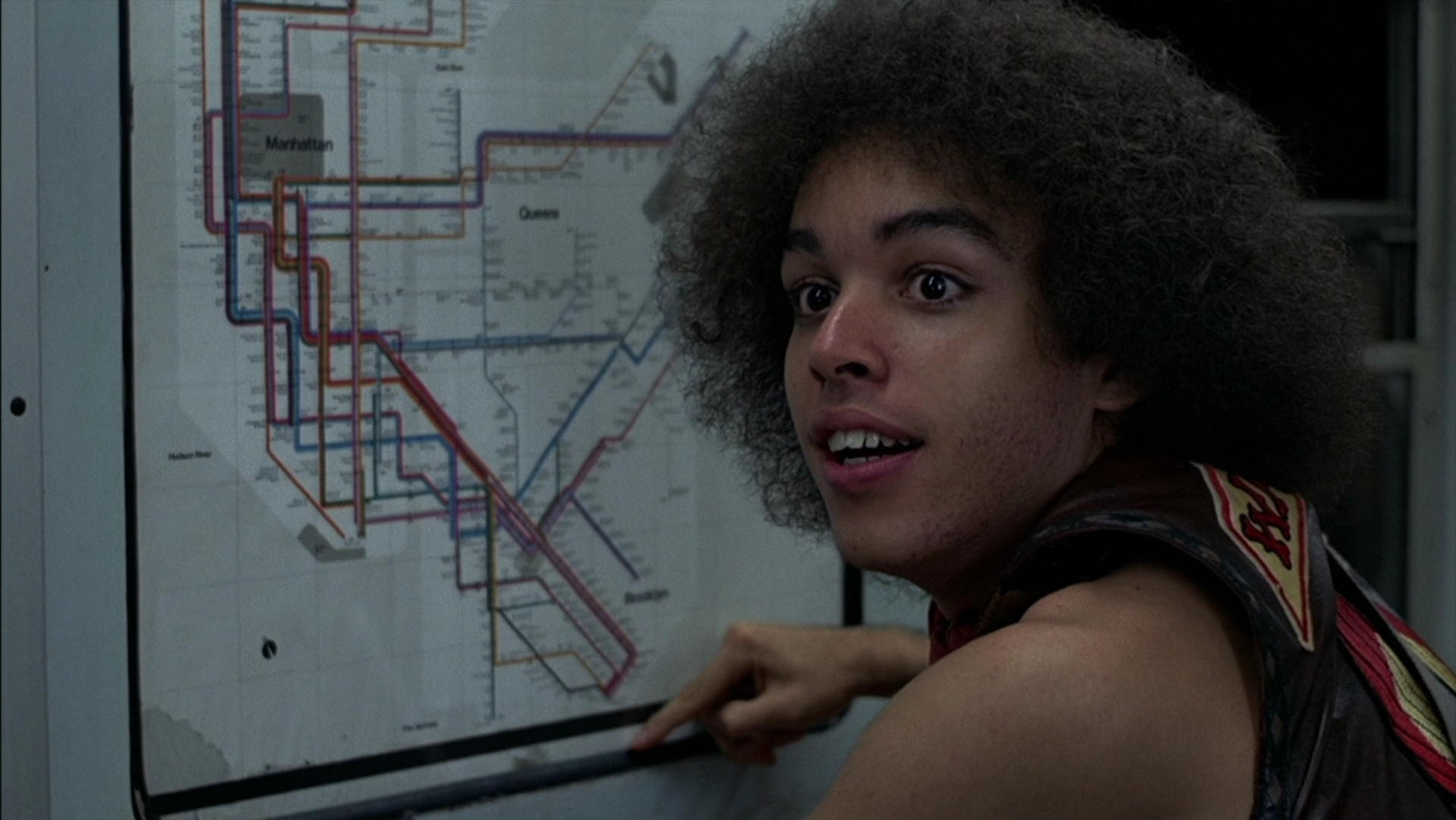
- Marcelino Sánchez in The Warriors
- Born: December 5, 1957; Cayey, Puerto Rico
- Died: November 21, 1986 (aged 28); Hollywood, California, U.S.
- Other name: James Marcelino
- Occupation: Actor
- Years active: 1977–1985

Marcelino Sánchez (December 5, 1957 – November 21, 1986) was a Puerto Rican actor, known for playing the character Rembrandt in the 1979 film The Warriors.

== Career ==
Sánchez began acting in the late 1970s. His first major role was in the film The Warriors (1979), playing the character of Rembrandt, a young gang member with a flair for spray painting. He played Ricardo on The Bloodhound Gang mystery vignettes featured on the 1980s children's educational television show 3-2-1 Contact. He also appeared on the TV series CHiPs and Hill Street Blues, as well as in the feature film 48 Hrs. (1982).

== Death ==
Sánchez died of AIDS in his Hollywood home on November 21, 1986, at the age of 28.

== Filmography ==
=== Film ===
Year	Title	Role	Notes
1977	The Stowaway	Man in Green Apron (uncredited)	Short film
1978	Big Apple Birthday	The Fiddlers Three	Short film
1979	The Warriors	Rembrandt	
1982	48 Hrs.	Parking Lot Attendant (as James Marcelino)	

=== Television ===
Year	Title	Role	Notes
1980	3-2-1 Contact	Ricardo	"The Bloodhound Gang" segments
1980	Death Penalty	Paco Sanchez	TV movie
1981	Hill Street Blues	Tall Kid (as Marcelino Sanchez)	"Fruits of the Poisonous Tree" (Season 2, Episode 5)
1982	CHiPS	Ramon	"Tiger in the Streets" (Season 5, Episode 14)
1981	Hill Street Blues	Jimmy Aguirrez (as Marcelino Sanchez)	"Pestolozzi's Revenge" (Season 2, Episode 9)
1984	Hill Street Blues	Musician (as James Marcelino)	"Lucky Ducks" (Season 4, Episode 21)
1985	CBS Schoolbreak Special	Manuel (as James Marcelino)	"Student Court" (Season 2, Episode 6)
1985	CBS Schoolbreak Special	Jesse (as James Marcelino)	"The War Between Classes" (Season 3, Episode 1)
