= Rocky Davis =

In comics, Rocky Davis may refer to the following characters:

- Absorbing Man (Carl Creel) used the name during his boxing career
- Rockwell Davis, cousin of Creel, was nicknamed Rocky Davis
- Rocky Davis, a member of the Challengers of the Unknown
