= Warrior (disambiguation) =

A warrior is a person engaged or experienced in warfare, or a figurative term for a person who shows or has shown great vigor, courage, or aggressiveness, as in politics or athletics.

Warrior or Warriors may also refer to:

== Indigenous groups ==
- Mohawk Warrior Society (Rotisken’rakéhte) (also known as Kahnawake Warrior Society), a Mohawk First Nations group
- Tribal Warrior, an Australian Aboriginal organisation based in Redfern, New South Wales

== Military ==
=== Military vehicles ===
- American privateer Warrior, New York privateer in the War of 1812
- HMS Warrior, name of four Royal Navy ships and one shore establishment
- iRobot Warrior, robotic unmanned ground vehicle made by iRobot
- MQ-1C Warrior, unmanned aerial vehicle currently being developed by the US Army
- OH-58D Kiowa Warrior
- Warrior (steamboat), ship used during the Black Hawk War
- Warrior tracked armoured vehicle, used by the British Army
- Warrior-class ironclad, a class of two ironclads in the Royal Navy

=== Other military uses ===
- Cold warrior
- Land Warrior
- Urban Warrior

== Other vehicles ==
- Mitsubishi L200 Warrior, pickup truck
- Pawnee Warrior, an American helicopter design
- Piper PA-28 "Warrior", a single-engine light airplane produced by Piper Aircraft
- Yamaha Warrior, a motorcycle

== People ==
- Warrior, a member class of the Tribe of Mic-O-Say (Boy Scouts of America honor society)
- "Warrior", a pseudonym used by English electronic music producer Michael Woods
- Big Warrior (died 1826), historical principal chief of the Creek Nation
- Nickname given to American baseball player Paul O'Neill
- Betsy Warrior, American feminist and author
- Dennis Warrior, British rugby league footballer
- Ultimate Warrior, born Jim Hellwig and legally known as Warrior (1959–2014), American professional wrestler and motivational speaker
- The Unknown Warrior
- Warrior of Hirschlanden (Iron Age statue)
- Women warriors in literature and culture

== Places ==
=== In the United States ===
- Warrior, Alabama
- Black Warrior River, Alabama
- Little Warrior River, Alabama
- Locust Fork of the Black Warrior River, Alabama
- Mulberry Fork of the Black Warrior River, Alabama
- Sipsey Fork of the Black Warrior River, Alabama
- Warrior Mountain, Maryland (link also includes Warrior Ridge)
- Warriors Mark Township, Pennsylvania

== Arts, entertainment, and media ==
=== Fictional characters ===
- Warrior, one alias of DC Comics character Guy Gardner
- Warrior (character class), a character class in many print and online role-playing games

=== Films ===
- A Warrior's Heart, developed under the title Warrior, a 2011 American film
- Guerreros (English: Warriors), a 2002 Spanish film
- The Warriorr, a 2022 Indian action film
- Yoddha: The Warrior, a 2014 Indian film by Raj Chakraborty
- Musa (film), a South Korean film released as The Warrior in English-speaking countries
- The Warrior (2001 British film), a British-produced film set in India, spoken entirely in Hindi, and filmed by Asif Kapadia
- The Warrior (2015 film), a Russian mixed martial arts film
- The Warriors (film), 1979 American action thriller
- Warrior (2007 film), a Chinese animation
- Warrior (2011 film), an American mixed martial arts film
- Warrior (2026 film), an Indian drama

=== Video games ===
- Warrior (arcade game), a 1979 arcade game, regarded as the first versus fighting game
- Warriors, a video game franchise created by Omega Force and published by Koei Tecmo
- The Warriors (video game) (2005–2007), based on the 1979 film of the same name

=== Literature ===
- Warrior, a 1995 novel by Don Bendell
- Warrior (Jennifer Fallon novel), a 2004 novel by Jennifer Fallon
- Warrior, a novel in the Isaac Asimov's Robots in Time series
- Warrior, a 2008 novel by Allan Mallinson
- Warrior, a 1991 novel by Ann Maxwell, under the pseudonym Elizabeth Lowell
- Warrior, a 1990 novel by Donald E. McQuinn, the first volume in the Moondark Saga
- Warrior, a 1990 novel by Kevin D. Randle, under the pseudonym Eric Helm
- Warriors, a 1990 novel by Barrett Tillman
- Warriors (anthology), edited by George R. R. Martin and Gardner Dozois
- Warriors (novel series), a series of fantasy novels about cats written by several authors under the pen name Erin Hunter
  - Warriors (arc), the first story arc in the series
- Warriors, a series of novels taking place in the Dragonlance realm
- Arena 13: The Warrior, a 2007 novel by Joseph Delaney, the third installment in the Arena 13 trilogy
- The Warrior, a 1967 novel by Wade Everett
- The Warrior, a 1995 novel by Nicole Jordan
- The Warrior, a 1987 novel by Barry Sadler, the 17th volume in the Casca series
- The Warrior, a 1991 novel by David Drake, the fifth volume in the Hammer's Slammers series
- The Warrior, a 2014 novel by Victoria Scott, the third installment in the Dante Walker trilogy
- The Warrior, a 1956 novel by Frank G. Slaughter

=== Music ===
==== Groups ====
- Warrior (band), an American heavy metal band
- Warrior, former name of British heavy metal band Battleaxe
- Warriors (band), Yugoslav/Canadian heavy metal band
- The Warriors (British band) British beat band

==== Albums ====
- Warrior (Kesha album), 2012
- Warrior (Scandal album), 1984
- Warrior (Unleashed album), 1997
- Warrior (single album), by B.A.P
- The Warrior, reissue title of Ojah Awake by Osibisa
- Warrior, an EP by Foxes, 2012
- Warrior, a 1994 album by Noel Richards
- Warrior, a 2007 album by Michael Rose
- Warriors (1983 Warriors album)
- Warriors (1984 Warriors album)
- Warriors (2Baba album), 2020
- Warriors (Agnostic Front album), 2007
- Warriors (Gary Numan album), 1983
- Warriors (jazz album), a 1978 album by Don Pullen, Chico Freeman, Fred Hopkins and Bobby Battle
- Warriors (Lisa Mitchell album), 2016
- Warriors (Lin-Manuel Miranda and Eisa Davis album), 2024 concept album based on the 1979 film
- Warriorz, a 2000 album by M.O.P.

==== Songs and singles ====
- "Warrior" (B.A.P song), 2012
- "Warrior" (Delta Goodrem song), 2026
- "Warrior" (Disturbed song), 2011
- "Warrior" (Nelly song), 2008
- "Warrior" (Kimbra song), 2012
- "Warrior" (Kesha song), 2012
- "Warrior" (Amber Bondin song), 2014
- "Warrior" (Havana Brown song), 2013
- "Warrior" (Demi Lovato song), 2013
- "Warrior" (Nina Sublatti song), 2015
- "Warrior", a song by Altaria from their 2009 album Unholy
- "Warrior", a song by Atreyu from their 2021 album Baptize
- "Warrior", a song by AURORA from her 2016 album All My Demons Greeting Me as a Friend
- "Warrior", a song by CarryMinati, 2020
- "Warrior", a song by Dead by April from their 2017 album Worlds Collide
- "Warrior", a song by Erra from their 2014 EP Moments of Clarity
- "Warrior", a song by Firewind from their 2002 album Between Heaven and Hell
- "Warrior", a song by Helloween from their 1985 EP Helloween
- "Warrior", a song by Impellitteri from their 1994 album Answer to the Master
- "Warrior", a song by Iron Savior from their 2002 album Condition Red
- "Warrior", a song by Matisyahu
- "Warrior", a song by Michael Woods, 2000
- "Warrior", a song by War of Ages from their 2017 album Alpha
- "Warrior", a song by Wishbone Ash from their 1972 album Argus
- "Warriors" (Gary Numan song), a 1983 song by Gary Numan
- "Warriors" (Imagine Dragons song), 2014; official theme of the 2014 League of Legends World Championship
- "Warriors" a song by Aaliyah Rose; opening theme of She-Ra and the Princesses of Power
- "Warriors", a song by Crossfaith from their 2024 album Ark
- "Warriors", a song by Hawkwind from their 1975 album Warrior on the Edge of Time
- "Warriors", a song by Seventh Wonder from their 2022 album The Testament
- "Warriors", a song by Warkings from their 2020 album Revenge
- "Warriors", a song by Warren Hue and Seori from Shang-Chi and the Legend of the Ten Rings: The Album
- "The Warrior" (song), a 1984 song by Scandal
- "The Warrior", a song by Orphaned Land from their 2010 album The Never Ending Way of ORWarriOR

=== Television ===
==== Series ====
- Warriors (1999 TV series), a BBC drama series, about British peacekeepers in the Bosnian war
- Warriors (2009 TV series), a History Channel series hosted by Terry Schappert
- Heroes and Villains (TV series), played in the US on the Military Channel as Warriors
- Warrior (TV series), a 2019 American action television series based on an original concept by Bruce Lee and produced by Cinemax

==== Episodes ====
- "Warrior", Attack on Titan season 2, episode 6 (2017)
- "Warrior", Killer Women episode 3 (2014)
- "Warrior", Meet the Ancestors series 2, episode 6 (1999)
- "Warrior" Skam France season 10, episode 8 (2022)
- "Warrior", Smallville season 9, episode 10 (2010)
- "Warrior", Tugs episode 6 (1989)
- "Warrior", Utawarerumono: The False Faces episode 20 (2016)
- "Warrior", Young David episode 1 (2023)
- "Warriors", America at a Crossroads season 1, episode 2 (2007)
- "Warriors", Avatar: The Last Airbender (2024) season 1, episode 2 (2024)
- "Warriors", Bergerac series 9, episode 8 (1991)
- "Warriors", Blue Bloods season 3, episode 15 (2013)
- "Warriors", Bonekickers episode 2 (2008)
- "Warriors", China Beach season 3, episode 16 (1990)
- "Warriors", Designated Survivor season 1, episode 11 (2017)
- "Warriors", Di-Gata Defenders season 1, episode 15 (2006)
- "Warriors", Guin Saga episode 11 (2009)
- "Warriors (Part 1)" and "Warriors (Part 2)", Hangin' with Mr. Cooper season 1, episodes 6–7 (1992)
- "Warriors", Mankind: The Story of All of Us episode 4 (2012)
- "Warriors", Sanctuary season 1, episode 10 (2008)
- "Warriors", The Last Ship season 5, episode 5 (2018)
- "Warriors", The Sentinel season 3, episode 1 (1997)
- "Warriors", Too Cute Crisis episode 11 (2023)
- "Warriors" Walker, Texas Ranger season 5, episode 20 (1998)
- "The Warrior", Beavis and Butt-Head season 10, episode 17 (2023)
- "The Warrior", Centurions episode 30 (1986)
- "The Warrior", Fantasy Island season 4, episode 12b (1981)
- "The Warrior", Hawkeye episode 9 (1994)
- "The Warrior", Highway Thru Hell season 8, episode 16 (2020)
- "The Warrior", Knuckles episode 1 (2024)
- "The Warrior", Mixed-ish season 1, episode 2 (2019)
- "The Warrior", Paul T. Goldman episode 6 (2023)
- "The Warrior", Perception season 2, episode 10 (2013)
- "The Warrior", Psi Factor: Chronicles of the Paranormal season 2, episode 7 (1997)
- "The Warrior", Stargate SG-1 season 5, episode 18 (2002)
- "The Warrior", The New Adventures of Flash Gordon season 2, episode 5b (1982)
- "The Warrior" The Nurses, season 2, episode 35 (1964)
- "The Warrior", Young Dan'l Boone episode 8 (1978)

=== Other arts, entertainment, and media ===
- Warrior (comics), a British anthology magazine
- Warrior (1982 painting), painting by American artist Jean-Michel Basquiat
- Warrior (TUGS), a fictional character from the 1988 children's television series, TUGS
- Warrior (Archaeron), a 1981 supplement for the role-playing game Archaeron
- The Warrior (opera), a 1947 opera by Bernard Rogers and Norman Corwin
- Warriors (musical), 2027 musical by Lin-Manuel Miranda and Eisa Davis, based on the 1979 film

== Brands and enterprises ==
- Warriors (brand), a Malaysian corporation
- Warrior (shoes), a Chinese shoe makes
- Warrior Hotel
- Warrior Sports, a manufacturer of lacrosse, ice hockey and football (soccer) equipment and apparel
- Warriors, Inc., a technical adviser to Hollywood founded by Dale Dye

== Sports teams ==
=== American football ===
- Bucharest Warriors, an American football team from Romania

=== Association football ===
- Stenhousemuir F.C., a Scottish association football club nicknamed "The Warriors"
- Warriors FC, a Singaporean association football club
- Wexford Youths F.C., an Irish association football club nicknamed the "Warriors"
- Kabwe Warriors F.C., a Zambian football club based in Kabwe that plays in the Zambian Premier League
- El-Kanemi Warriors F.C., a football team based in Maiduguri, Borno State, Nigeria

=== Basketball ===
- Golden State Warriors, an American basketball team
- Indonesia Warriors, an Indonesian basketball club that competed in the ASEAN Basketball League
- Santa Cruz Warriors, an American basketball team
- Ulinzi Warriors, a Kenyan basketball team

=== Box Lacrosse ===
- Vancouver Warriors, professional Canadian lacrosse team in the National Lacrosse League

=== Cricket ===
- Guyana Amazon Warriors, a franchise cricket team of the Caribbean Premier League based in Providence, Georgetown, Guyana
- Kurunegala Warriors, a Sri Lankan domestic T20 cricket team
- Pune Warriors India, a domestic T20 cricket team in the Indian Premier League
- UP Warriorz, an Indian domestic T20 cricket team in the Women's Premier League
- Warriors cricket team, a South African cricket team based in Port Elizabeth
- Western Australia cricket team, an Australian cricket team nicknamed the "Warriors"

=== Ice hockey ===
- Akwesasne Warriors, a Mohawk ice hockey team
- Sparta Warriors, a Norwegian ice hockey club

=== Rugby league ===
- Central Florida Warriors, an American rugby league team
- New Haven Warriors, a former American rugby league team
- New Zealand Warriors (formerly Auckland Warriors), a New Zealand rugby league team
- Wigan Warriors, an English rugby league team

=== Rugby union ===
- Celtic Warriors, a defunct Welsh rugby union team
- Glasgow Warriors, a Scottish rugby union team
- Helsinki Warriors, a Finnish rugby union team
- Worcester Warriors, an English rugby union team

=== General ===
- Bay City Western High School, an American high school that uses "Warriors" as the name for its sports teams
- Brother Rice High School (Michigan)
- East Gaston High School, an American high school that uses "Warriors" as the name for its sports teams
- Hawaii Warriors, the sports teams of the University of Hawaii at Manoa
- Indiana Tech, the sports teams of the Indiana Institute of Technology
- Merrimack College, an American college that uses "Warriors" as the name for its sports teams
- Mission San Jose High School, a California high school that uses "Warriors" as the name for its sports teams
- Niskayuna High School, an American high school that uses "Warriors" as the name for its sports teams
- UE Red Warriors, the sports teams of University of the East in Manila, Philippines
- USC Warriors, the sports teams of the University of San Carlos in Cebu City, Philippines
- Waterloo Warriors, the sports teams of the University of Waterloo in Ontario, Canada

== Other uses ==
- Warrior (army horse), an equine recipient of the Dickin Medal honouring the work of animals in war
- The Warrior (Marini), a sculpture
- Warrior (racehorse), Australian racehorse that won the 1869 Melbourne Cup

== See also ==
- Ninja Warrior (disambiguation)
- Road warrior (disambiguation)
- The Warriors (disambiguation)
