= The Warriors =

The Warriors may refer to:

== Fiction ==
=== The Warriors franchise ===
- The Warriors (Yurick novel), a 1965 novel by Sol Yurick
  - The Warriors (film), a 1979 film, directed by Walter Hill and based on the Sol Yurick novel
  - The Warriors (video game), a 2005 video game based on the 1979 film
  - The Warriors: Street Brawl, a 2009 video game also based on the 1979 film, but unrelated to the 2005 title

=== Audio ===
- The Warriors (Doctor Who audio), a Big Finish Productions audio drama

=== Film ===
- The Warriors, also known as The Dark Avenger, a 1955 film starring Errol Flynn

=== Literature ===
- The Warriors, a 1903 book by Anna Robertson Brown Lindsay
- "The Warriors", a 1956 short story by Arthur Sellings
- "The Warriors", a 1962 short story by Tom Purdom
- "The Warriors", a 1966 short story by Larry Niven, featured in the 1969 collection The Shape of Space
- The Warriors (Jakes novel), a 1977 novel by John Jakes

=== Television ===
==== Episodes ====
- "The Warriors", Bucky O'Hare and the Toad Wars! episode 11 (1991)
- "The Warriors", Rollergirls episode 4 (2006)
- "The Warriors", The Gallant Men episode 21 (1963)
- "The Warriors", The Guns of Will Sonnett episode 25 (1968)

==== Shows ====
- The Warriors (TV series), an Australian television comedy drama series

== Sports ==
- The New Zealand Warriors (formerly the Auckland Warriors), a professional rugby league team
- The Wigan Warriors, a professional rugby league team based in Wigan, England
- The Golden State Warriors, an NBA team
- The Moose Jaw Warriors, a major junior ice hockey team based in Canada.
- Stenhousemuir F.C., a Scottish association football club, nicknamed "The Warriors"
- Warriors (cricket team), the name used by the combined Eastern Province and Border first class cricket teams in South Africa
- Warriors RC, a Finnish rugby club in Helsinki

== Music ==
- The Warriors: An Imaginary Ballet, a work for orchestra and three pianos composed by Percy Grainger
- The Warriors (American band), a hardcore punk band
- The Warriors (British band), a Beatles inspired rock band
- Warriors (band), a Yugoslav heavy metal band
- "The Warriors", a song by Royce da 5'9" featuring Slaughterhouse from Street Hop
- The Warriors (soundtrack), the soundtrack to the 1979 film The Warriors
- Warriors (Lin-Manuel Miranda and Eisa Davis album), 2024 concept album based on the 1979 film
- Warriors (musical), 2027 musical based on the 2024 concept album
- The Warriors EP, a 1999 EP by P.O.D.

== See also ==
- Warrior (disambiguation)
