= Scott Wasserman =

American musician, composer and director

- Born: September 27, 1988 (age 38); East Hampton, Connecticut, U.S.
- Occupations: Composer, Orchestrator, Arranger, Conductor, Musical Director, Electronic Music Programmer
- Years active: 2010-
- Spouse: Meghan Wasserman (m. 2016)

Scott Wasserman (born September 27, 1988) is an American musician, composer, orchestrator, musical director, and electronic music programmer who has worked on many shows both on and off Broadway. He originated the technical role of Ableton Programmer for Hamilton, and has reprised that role for Dear Evan Hansen and Natasha, Pierre & The Great Comet of 1812.

== Background ==
Wasserman was born in East Hampton, Connecticut. He attended East Hampton High School, and then Carnegie Mellon University's School of Music, where he earned a BFA in Music Composition.

== Career ==
Wasserman worked as Music Production Assistant on the Broadway musical Leap of Faith, as well as the 2012 Broadway revival of Annie, on which he worked with orchestrator and arranger Alex Lacamoire.

Wasserman went on to work with Lacamoire on the original Broadway production of Hamilton, for which Lacamoire was Music Director; Wasserman was credited as "Ableton Programmer/Beatmaster", as well as Music Assistant, for Hamilton. Wasserman was involved early in the production, including the show's off-Broadway production at The Public Theater, and has since been involved in subsequent productions of Hamilton as well, training each orchestra and serving as rehearsal DJ. The show's Original Broadway Cast Recording was released digitally on September 25, 2015, and by Atlantic Records as a two-disc set on October 25, 2015. It won a Grammy Award for Best Musical Theater Album in 2016.

Wasserman also worked with Lacamoire on Dear Evan Hansen, for which Wasserman is credited as Ableton Programmer. Wasserman has been interviewed about the way the Ableton software has been incorporated into Dear Evan Hansen's multimedia production. The show's Original Broadway Cast Recording was released digitally on February 3, 2017 and in compact disc on February 24, 2017. It won a Grammy Award for Best Musical Theater Album in 2018.

Wasserman is also credited as Ableton Programmer on the Broadway production of Natasha, Pierre & The Great Comet of 1812, and as Rehearsal Pianist for the La Jolla Playhouse production of the Jimmy Buffett musical Escape to Margaritaville.

Wasserman worked as Ableton Programmer on the Broadway productions of Redwood and The Queen of Versailles, and on electronic music design for the Broadway productions of Diana and Wanted and on the off-Broadway production of Walk on Through. He is also continuing his work with Lin-Manuel Miranda and Andy Blankenbuehler on the upcoming Warriors musical, based on the film and novel of the same name.

In addition to his work on stage productions, Wasserman has also contributed to productions on radio, television, and film. He was a musician and co-orchestrator on 21 Chump Street, a musical created by Lin-Manuel Miranda for This American Life. He was a musician and orchestrator for The CW's Crazy Ex-Girlfriend. And he worked as a copyist for Mufasa: The Lion King.

Since 2016, Wasserman has co-hosted a weekly podcast, Song Salad, with writing partner Shannon Deep, in which the duo compose a song about a "random topic" (using Wikipedia's random article function) in a "random music genre".

In 2020, Wasserman co-created (alongside Joshua Hinck) Losing My Mind: A Sondheim Disco Fever Dream, a musical theater–disco crossover album in honor of Stephen Sondheim's 90th birthday.

== Awards and nominations ==
Year	Award	Category	Nominated work	Result
2016	Grammy Award	Best Musical Theater Album	Hamilton	Won
2018	Grammy Award	Best Musical Theater Album	Dear Evan Hansen	Won
