= Gray's Papaya =

Hot dog restaurant chain in New York City

Coordinates: 40.73365°N 73.99929°W

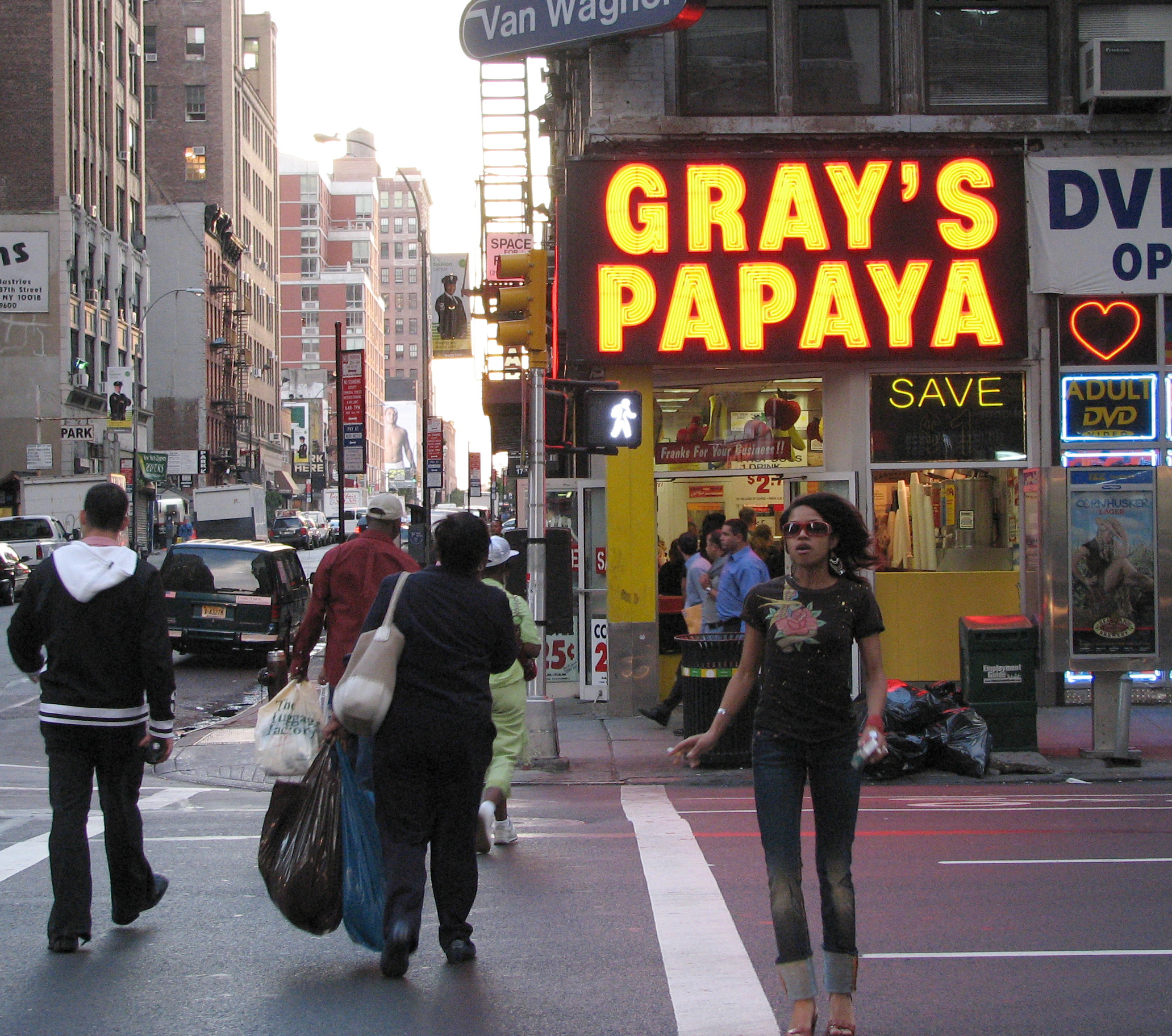
- Gray's Papaya former midtown location
- Industry: Fast food restaurant
- Founded: 1973; 53 years ago in New York City
- Founder: Nicholas Gray
- Number of locations: 1 (2020)
- Area served: New York City

Gray's Papaya is a hot dog restaurant located at 2090 Broadway at 72nd Street in New York City. It had other locations, all of which had closed by June 2020. Gray's Papaya is famous for its inexpensive high-quality hot dogs, considered among the best in New York City. They once sold for 50 cents each and, as of 2026, sell for $3.45.

The "papaya" in the name refers to the papaya fruit drink sold at the establishment. They also sell orange, grape, piña colada, coconut champagne and banana daiquiri fruit drinks, all of which are non-alcoholic.

== History ==
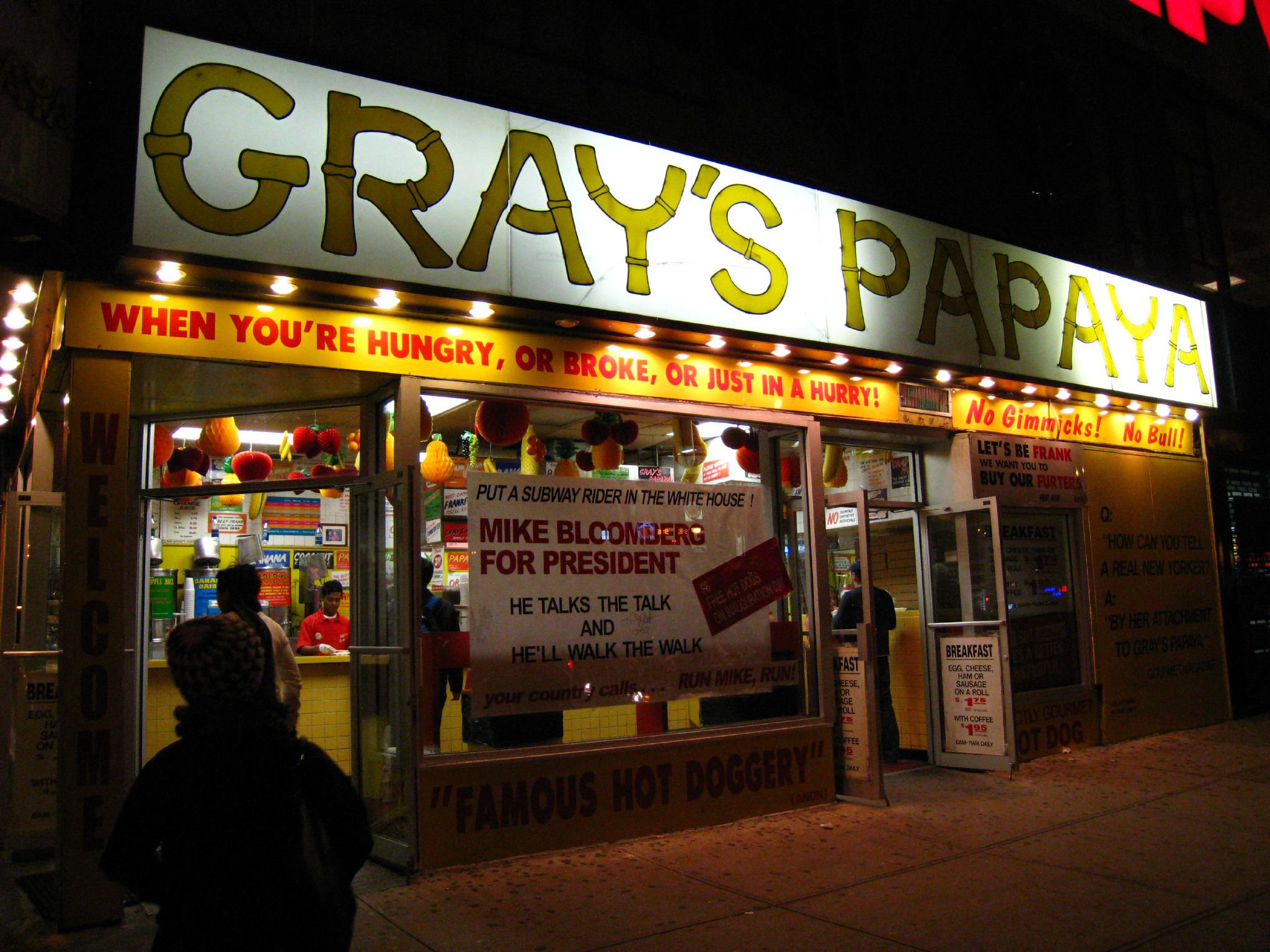
The restaurant exterior

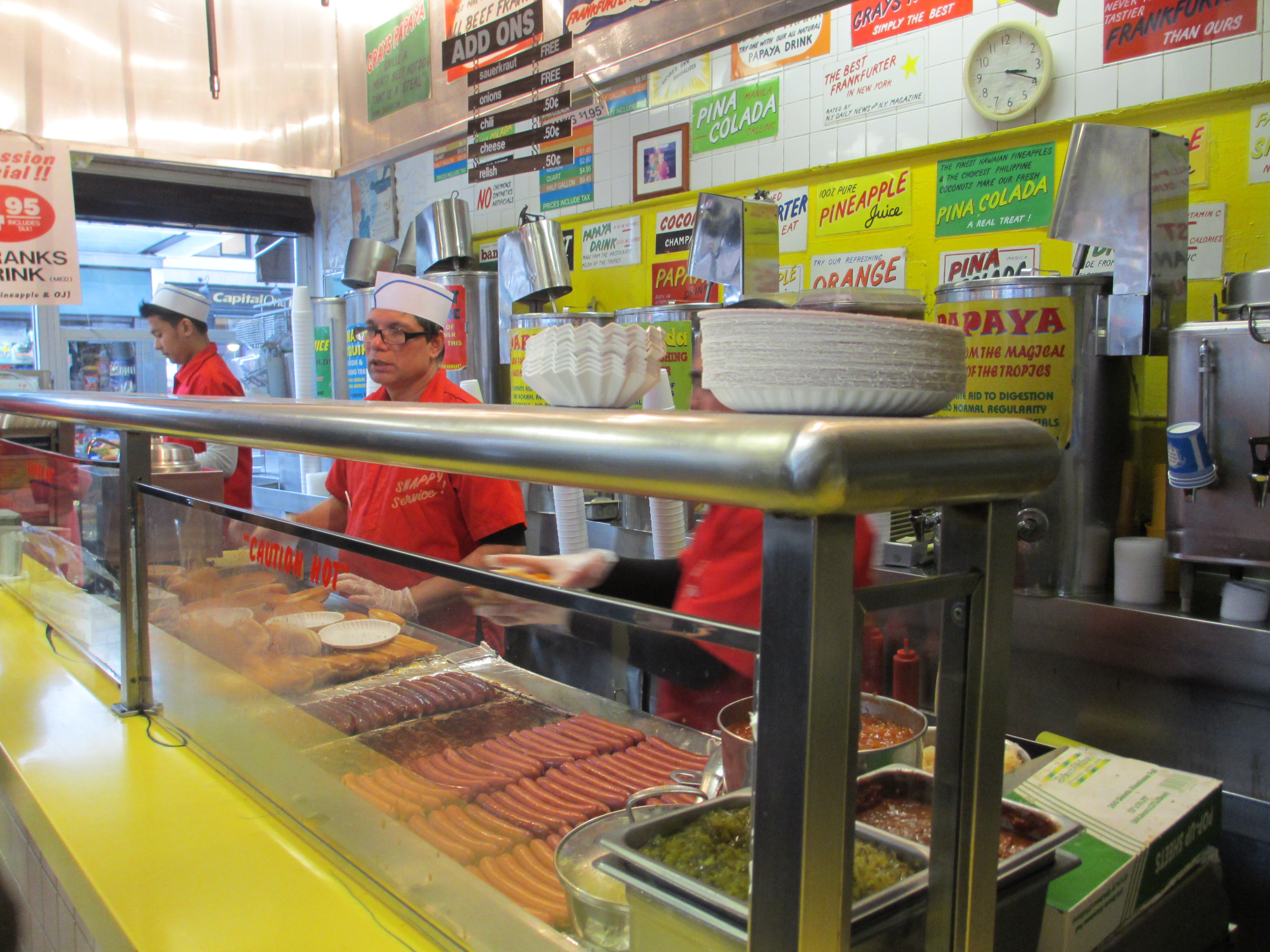
Prep counter

The chain was founded by a former partner of Papaya King, Nicholas Gray, in 1973, with its flagship, and as of 2023, only restaurant, located at 2090 Broadway at 72nd Street.

In the June 1, 2006, issue of Time Out New York, Gray's Papaya's hot dog was ranked first over its competitors Papaya King and Papaya Dog. On March 3, 2008, The New York Times reported that Gray's Papaya had endorsed Democratic candidate Barack Obama in his campaign for the 2008 U.S. Presidential Election.

The former Hell’s Kitchen location of Gray's Papaya (at Eighth Avenue and 37th Street) closed in 2011 and the Greenwich Village branch (on Sixth Avenue at 8th Street) in 2014 due to rent increases. For several years after, the flagship location at 72nd street was the only location left.

In 2016, Gray's Papaya signed a 20-year lease for a new midtown location on Eighth Avenue, between West 39th and West 40th streets. The location opened in spring 2017 but closed in 2020 due to the economic effects of the COVID-19 pandemic in New York City.

On March 30 2020, they shuttered their flagship location for the "first time in 47 years", due to Covid. Gray's Papaya reopened the location in May 2020, with a new version of its "recession special" that featured two franks and a tropical drink for $6.95 including tax, with frontline healthcare workers eating the special for free. In 2020, Thrillist listed it as one of the best hot dog locations in New York.

Gray died in May 2023 at 86 due to complications from Alzheimer's. Gray's family reportedly has friendly relations with the flagship store's landlord, and plans to keep the restaurant open.

== Menu ==
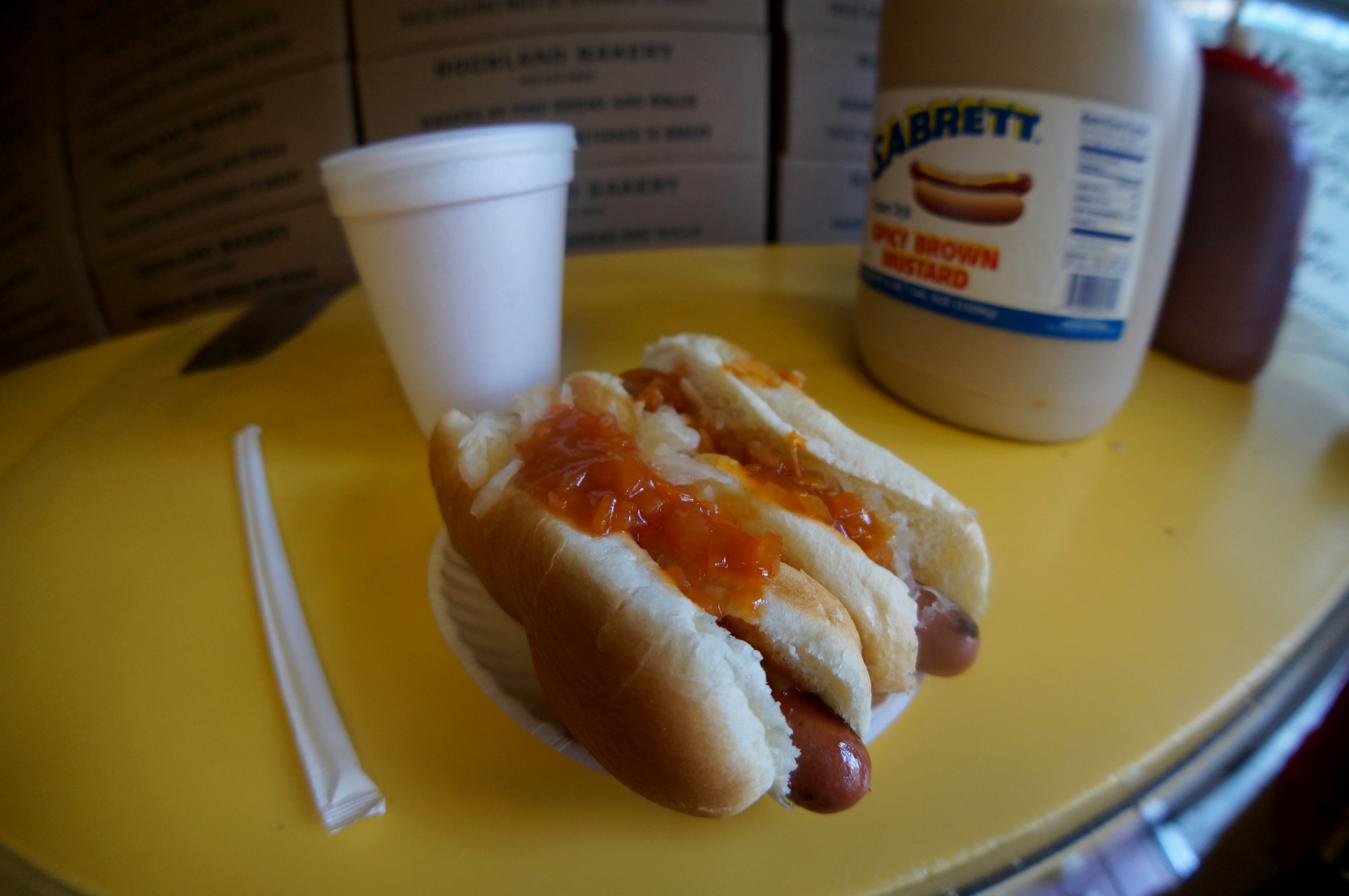
Two hot dogs with sauerkraut and onions

Gray's Papaya is famous for its inexpensive (once sold for 50 cents, as of 2026, sells for $3.45), high-quality hot dogs. The "papaya" in the name refers to the papaya fruit drink sold at the establishment. They also sell orange, grape, piña colada, coconut champagne (non-alcoholic), and banana daiquiri (non-alcoholic) fruit drinks. They sell a variety of sodas.

The franchise has natural skinned franks. Gray's Papaya hot dogs are considered among the best in New York City.

== Media ==
- In the 1979 experimental novel The Princess of 72nd Street by Elaine Kraf, the protagonist eats a hot dog in a "crowded papaya stand" that had replaced a previous facility on the corner of West 72nd Street and Broadway.
- In the 1995 collection of short stories Seduction Theory by Thomas Beller, in the story "The Hot Dog Wars", the protagonist falls in love with an elusive hot dog eater set against the backdrop of a hot dog price war.
- In the 1995 film Die Hard with a Vengeance, a scene takes place across the street at 72nd and Broadway, with the sign shown prominently.
- In the 1997 film Fools Rush In, one of the characters (Salma Hayek) has Gray's Papaya hot dogs delivered to her husband (Matthew Perry) in Las Vegas as a birthday present.
- In the 1998 film You've Got Mail, Tom Hanks and Meg Ryan's characters are seen chatting at the Gray's Papaya counter.
- The 2001 film Down to Earth starring Chris Rock also features the restaurant.
- In the 2002 Sex and the City chapter "Plus One is the Loneliest Number" (season 5, episode 5), Carrie Bradshaw visited Gray's Papaya after her book presentation.
- In a 2007 episode of Anthony Bourdain: No Reservations (season 3, episode 8), Anthony Bourdain visited Gray's Papaya on his tour of his favorite New York City restaurants.
- Chapter 26 in William Gibson's book Spook Country is called "Gray's Papaya" and takes place in the restaurant.
- It is also featured in the 2008 movie Nick and Norah’s Infinite Playlist.
- In the 2010 film The Back-Up Plan, Jennifer Lopez orders a hot dog for takeout dinner.
- In the 2005 season of How I Met Your Mother, in the limo, Ted and the others go to Gray’s Papaya on New Year's Eve.
- In the 2011 season 4 of Castle, episode 8 - "Heartbreak Hotel", Castle offers to take his daughter, Alexis, to smuggle Grey's Papaya into the theater
- In 2023 season of Manifest, in the first episode as Ben and Michaela Stone escaped the Registry, Ben makes a comment that he wished they stopped by Gray’s Papaya.
- In Thomas Pynchon's 2013 novel Bleeding Edge, the zany NYC perturbations of the protagonists include a scene outside the Gray's Papaya at 72nd and Broadway.
- The 2024 concept album Warriors, by Lin-Manuel Miranda and Eisa Davis, sets one scene "Outside Gray's Papaya".
