= Road warrior =

Road warrior(s) or The Road Warrior(s) m may refer to:

== Arts, entertainment, and media ==
- Road Warrior (Black Tide EP)
- "The Road Warrior" (The O.C.), an episode of The O.C.
- Mad Max 2 or The Road Warrior, a 1981 Australian film
  - Max Rockatansky, the film's titular character, who is also known as "The Road Warrior"
- Quarantine II: Road Warrior, a 1996 video game (often referred to as just "Road Warrior")

== Sports ==
- Greenville Road Warriors, an ice hockey team
- NLEX Road Warriors, a basketball team
- Road Warriors (Atlantic League), a baseball team
- Road Warriors, a professional wrestling team comprising:
  - Road Warrior Animal, the ring name of the American wrestler Joseph Michael Laurinaitis
  - Road Warrior Hawk, the ring name of Michael Hegstrand

== Other uses ==
- Road warrior (computing), a mobile worker who is constantly on the road

== See also ==
- Road Fighter, a 1984 racing video game
- Road Fighter (album) by South Korean boy band SechsKies
