= Warriors (musical) =

2027 musical by Lin Manuel-Miranda and Eisa Davis

- Logo
- Music: Lin-Manuel Miranda; Eisa Davis
- Lyrics: Lin-Manuel Miranda; Eisa Davis
- Book: Lin-Manuel Miranda; Eisa Davis
- Basis: The Warriors by; David Shaber; Walter Hill; The Warriors by Sol Yurick
- Productions: 2027 Broadway

Warriors is an upcoming musical with book, music, and lyrics by Lin-Manuel Miranda and Eisa Davis. It is based on both the 1979 film The Warriors and the original 1965 novel by Sol Yurick. Directed by Jenny Koons and co-directed and choreographed by Andy Blankenbuehler, Warriors is set to open on Broadway at the Lunt-Fontanne Theatre in 2027.

== Background ==
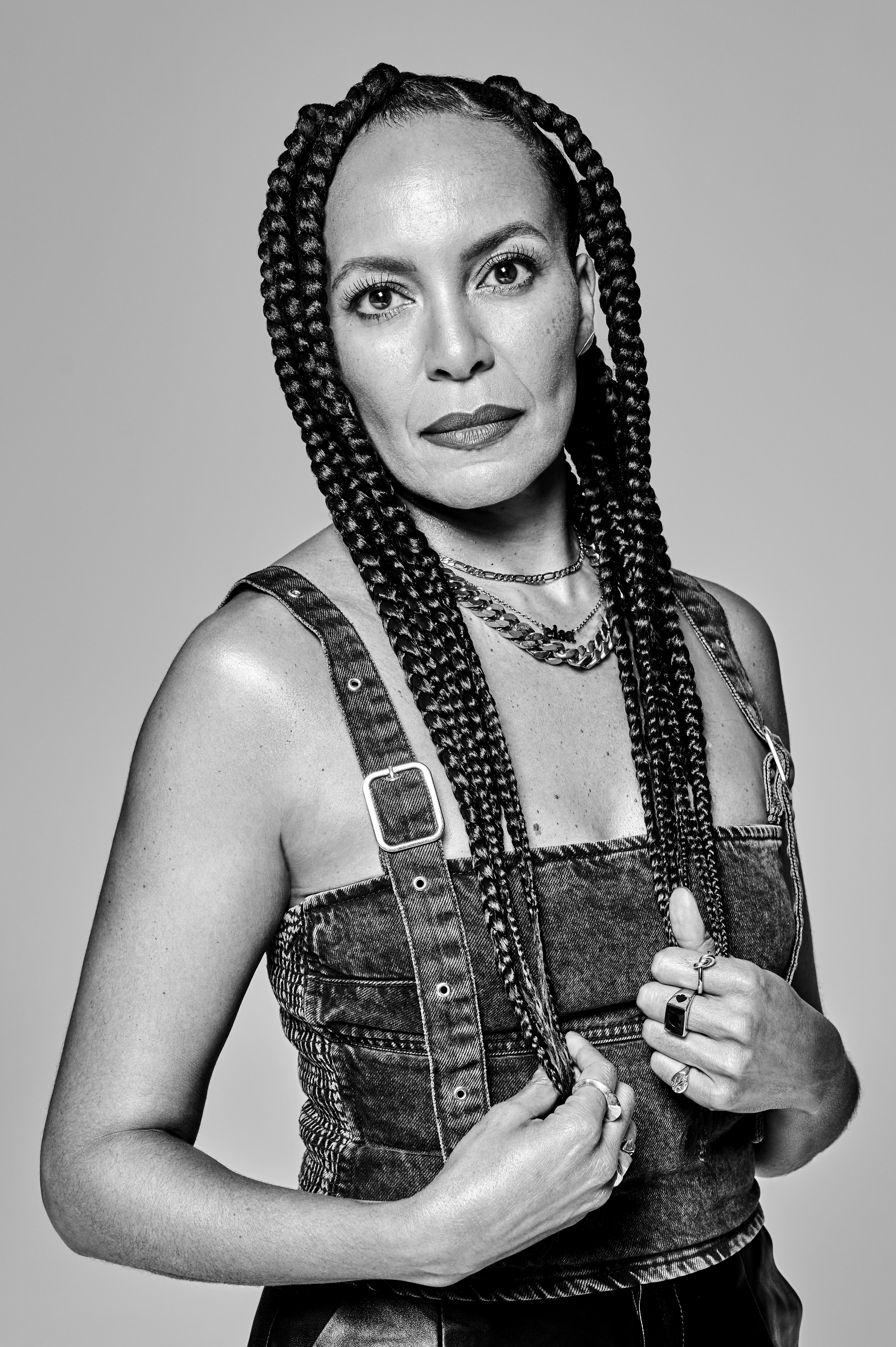
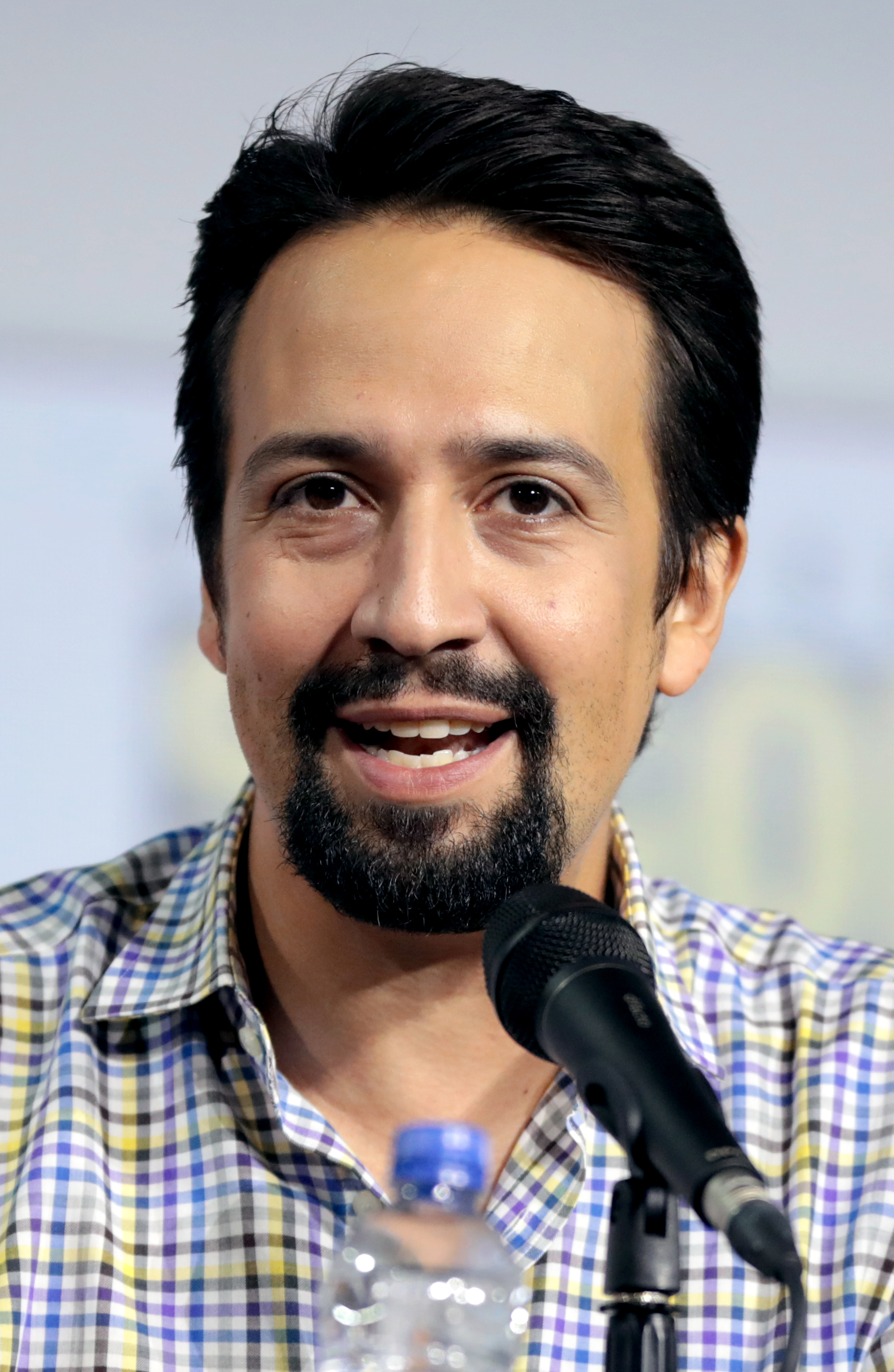
Warriors co-writers Eisa Davis (left, 2024) and Lin-Manuel Miranda (2019)

In 2009, a college classmate of American composer and playwright Lin-Manuel Miranda suggested a musical adaptation of 1979 film The Warriors, which Miranda dismissed at the time. However, in 2022, Miranda (a longtime fan of the film) proposed a collaboration adapting the film into a musical to playwright Eisa Davis, who Miranda had known since she starred in Passing Strange on Broadway at the same time that Miranda's In The Heights was playing. Miranda explained the collaboration as he wanted to work with someone "smarter and cooler" than himself. In August 2023, it was announced that Miranda was working on a stage adaptation of the Sol Yurick novel The Warriors, which provided the basis for the film. However, in July 2024 it was reported that the project would be a concept album rather than a stage musical. Miranda later explained this choice by noting that it allowed him to musicalize action sequences, avoiding the fact that "what's trickiest about adapting an action movie into a musical is that action sequences and songs are fighting for the same real estate." Davis also said that the form of an album is more apt for the score given its nature as a "hybrid of pop and musical theater." The album, Warriors, was released on October 18, 2024, featuring rappers including Nas, Lauryn Hill, and Busta Rhymes alongside Broadway performers.

It was initially unclear whether the album would lead to a stage musical, with Miranda and Davis telling The New York Times in 2024 that they did not have a theatrical producer or director attached, and were unsure how they would go about turning the album into a stage show. However, Miranda noted that he "would like to keep exploring it," and in an interview with The Guardian he called the idea of a stage version "enormous fun" and that he and Davis were open to the idea. On June 23, 2026, the stage adaptation was announced.

== Production ==
Warriors is produced by writer Lin-Manuel Miranda, his father Luis A. Miranda Jr., Thomas Kail, and Jeffrey Seller.

The Broadway production's creative team includes set design by David Korins, costume design by Dede Ayite, lighting design by Natasha Katz, sound design by Jason Crystal, projection design by Hana S. Kim, fight direction by Drew Leary, music supervision by Kurt Crowley, orchestrations by Crowley, Mike Elizondo, and Scott Wasserman, and wig, hair and makeup design by Nikiya Mathis.

The production will begin performances at the Lunt-Fontanne Theatre on March 9, 2027, with the official opening night on April 8, 2027.

== Cast ==
The cast was announced on October 20, 2026. Several cast members reprise their roles from the original concept album.

Character	Broadway
Character	2027
Fox	Jaci Calderon
Cleon	Aneesa Folds (Note: Reprising their role from the concept album.)
Ajax	Amber Gray
Mercy	Julia Harriman
Cowgirl	Sasha Hutchings
Rembrant	Gizel Jiménez
Swan	Jasmine Cephas Jones
Cochise	Kenita R. Miller
Cyrus	Sasha Allen
Luther	Casey Likes (Note: Likes featured in the concept album, portraying orphan Jesse.)
Masai	Donald Webber Jr.
