= The Confession (1999 film) =

- Theatrical release poster
- Directed by: David Hugh Jones
- Written by: Sol Yurick (novel); David Black (screenplay)
- Produced by: Elie Samaha; Andrew Stevens; Corrinne Mann; Alec Baldwin
- Starring: Ben Kingsley; Alec Baldwin
- Cinematography: Mike Fash
- Edited by: Ray Hubley
- Music by: Mychael Danna
- Distributed by: El Dorado Pictures; Phoenician Films
- Release date: March 29, 1999
- Running time: 114 minutes
- Country: United States
- Language: English
- Budget: $4,000,000

The Confession is a 1999 American drama film directed by David Hugh Jones, starring Ben Kingsley and Alec Baldwin. It is based on the novel Fertig by Sol Yurick.

== Plot ==
After his young son dies from the negligence of medical professionals at a hospital, Harry Fertig (Kingsley) takes matters into his own hands and kills the negligent doctors responsible. Slick lawyer Roy Bleakie (Baldwin), looking only to win a case and not caring of the matters involved, is assigned Fertig's case. Shocked to hear that his client wants to plead guilty, the case causes Bleakie to question his own morals by defending an honorable man.

== Cast ==
- Alec Baldwin as Roy Bleakie
- Ben Kingsley as Harry Fertig
- Amy Irving as Sarah Fertig
- Boyd Gaines as Liam Clarke
- Anne Twomey as Judge Judy Crossland
- Richard Jenkins as Coss O'Donell
- Kevin Conway as Mel Duden
- Jay O. Sanders as Jack Renoble
- Chris Noth as Campuso

== Production ==
Filming took place largely in Brooklyn and Manhattan, New York.
