= Sasha Hutchings =

American actress

- Hutchings in 2026
- Born: December 21, 1988 (age 37); Macon, Georgia, U.S.
- Occupation: Actress
- Years active: 2009–present

Sasha Hutchings (born December 21, 1988) is an American actress. She is best known for her role as an understudy and ensemble member in the original Broadway cast of Hamilton.

Hutchings has also appeared in the Broadway productions of Oklahoma!, My Fair Lady, Motown: the Musical, Rocky, Gypsy, and Memphis.

== Early life ==
Sasha Hutchings was born on December 21, 1988, in Macon, Georgia. Her father, Dr. William Hutchings, is a doctor, and her mother is a news anchor and teacher. Her father is of African-American descent. Hutchings attended Central High School, graduating from its Fine Arts and International Baccalaureate program in 2007.

Hutchings started taking dance lessons at 3 years old, and in her senior year of high school, her dance studio director inspired her to pursue dance as a career. Hutchings attended Oklahoma City University, majoring in dance performance at the Ann Lacy School of Dance and graduating in 2011.

== Career ==
Hutchings performed in various regional productions at the Lyric Theatre of Oklahoma, including Buddy: The Buddy Holly Story, Oliver!, Hairspray, Ragtime, and A Chorus Line, where she played Diana Morales. Starting December 13, 2011, Hutchings made her Broadway debut as a swing in the musical Memphis at the Shubert Theatre, remaining with the show until it closed on August 5, 2012. From March 11 to December 22, 2013, Hutchings performed as a swing and originated the roles of Claudette Robinson, Billie Jean Brown, and Marvelette in the Broadway production of Motown: The Musical at the Lunt-Fontanne Theatre. She reprised her roles from September 30 to October 19, 2014. In 2013, Hutchings appeared as a dancer in five episodes in the second season of the NBC musical television series Smash. Hutchings was also in the ensemble and played Apollo Girl in the original cast of the Broadway production of Rocky at the Winter Garden Theatre from February 13 to August 17, 2014.

Hutchings performed as an ensemble member and understudy for Peggy Schuyler and Maria Reynolds in the original cast of Hamilton by Lin-Manuel Miranda. She performed during its Off-Broadway run at The Public Theater from January 20 to May 3, 2015, and starting July 13, 2015, she reprised her roles for the Broadway production at the Richard-Rogers Theatre, leaving the show on August 27, 2016. Hamilton received high critical acclaim, winning eleven Tony Awards, including Best Musical, and eight Drama Desk Awards.

In 2016, Hutchings guest-starred as Ariel Rice in one episode of the CBS series Blue Bloods. She also performed in the Off-Broadway revival of Sweet Charity as Rosie and as a member of the ensemble, alongside Sutton Foster. The New Group production was held at The Pershing Square Signature Center from November 2, 2016, to January 8, 2017. From September 27 to October 29, 2017, she played Kathy Selden in the ZACH Theatre production of Singin' in the Rain in Austin, Texas. In 2017, she made her film debut as a secretary in The Vanishing of Sidney Hall and made a guest appearance as Amelia in the Netflix comedy series Master of None. Starting March 15, 2018, Hutchings performed in the original ensemble cast of the 2018 Broadway revival of My Fair Lady, before departing on March 10, 2019. Also in 2018, she appeared as Kourtney, a back-up dancer, in one episode of Netflix's Marvel series Jessica Jones, as well as Annie Tran in one episode of the Amazon Prime Video series The Dangerous Book for Boys.

From March 19, 2019, to January 19, 2020, Hutchings understudied the roles of Ado Annie Carnes, Laurey Williams, and the lead dancer in the 2019 Broadway revival of the musical Oklahoma!. The revival won the Tony Award for Best Revival of a Musical in 2019. She has also made television guest appearances as a dancer in an episode of the FX miniseries Fosse/Verdon in 2019 and as Colleen in an episode of Freeform comedy series The Bold Type in 2020. On July 3, 2020, the film version of Hamilton was released to Disney+, featuring her performance in the ensemble.

Hutchings plays the role of Cowgirl on the 2024 concept album by Lin-Manuel Miranda and Eisa Davis, Warriors.

== Personal life ==
Hutchings, along with other members of the Hamilton cast, helped organize the virtual fundraiser event Ham4Change in August 2020, raising over $1 million for charities supporting African Americans. Along with fellow cast member Jonathan Groff, Hutchings hosted a virtual fundraiser concert in support of the Democratic campaigns of Jon Ossoff and Raphael Warnock in the Georgia Senate Runoff elections that took place December 13, 2020. She is also a member of the Epic Theatre Ensemble's Artist Advisory Council, often holding dance workshops and master classes.

Starting October 2020, Hutchings and her Hamilton colleague Nik Walker together host their online talk show "The Chaos Twins" every other Wednesday.

== Filmography ==
=== Stage ===
Year	Title	Role	Notes
2010	Buddy: The Buddy Holly Story	Performer at the Apollo	Lyric Theatre of Oklahoma
2011	Oliver!		Lyric Theatre of Oklahoma
2011	Hairspray		Lyric Theatre of Oklahoma
2011	Ragtime		Lyric Theatre of Oklahoma
2011	A Chorus Line	Diana	Lyric Theatre of Oklahoma
2011	Memphis	Swing	Shubert Theatre • Broadway • Broadway debut
2012	Memphis	Swing	Shubert Theatre • Broadway • Broadway debut
2013	Motown: The Musical	Ensemble • Claudette Robinson • Billie Jean Brown • Marvelette • Swing	Lunt-Fontanne Theatre • Broadway
2014	Motown: The Musical	Ensemble • Claudette Robinson • Billie Jean Brown • Marvelette • Swing	Lunt-Fontanne Theatre • Broadway
2014	Rocky the Musical	Ensemble • Apollo Girl	Winter Garden Theatre • Broadway
2015	Hamilton	Ensemble • Dolly • u/s Peggy Schuyler • u/s Maria Reynolds	The Public Theater • Off-Broadway
2015	Hamilton	Ensemble • Dolly • u/s Peggy Schuyler • u/s Maria Reynolds	Richard Rodgers Theatre • Broadway
2015-16	Hamilton	Ensemble • Dolly • u/s Peggy Schuyler • u/s Maria Reynolds	Richard Rodgers Theatre • Broadway
2015-16	Sweet Charity	Rosie • Ensemble	The Pershing Square Signature Center • Off-Broadway
2017	Sweet Charity	Rosie • Ensemble	The Pershing Square Signature Center • Off-Broadway
2017	Singin' in the Rain	Kathy Selden	ZACH Theatre
2018	My Fair Lady	Ensemble	Lincoln Center Theater • Broadway
2019	My Fair Lady	Ensemble	Lincoln Center Theater • Broadway
2019	Oklahoma!	u/s Laurey Williams • u/s Ado Annie • u/s Lead Dancer	Circle in the Square Theatre • Broadway
2019	Oklahoma!	Ado Annie (Alternate)	Circle in the Square Theatre • Broadway
2019	Oklahoma!	Laurey Williams	Circle in the Square Theatre • Broadway
2019-20	Oklahoma!	u/s Laurey Williams • u/s Ado Annie • u/s Lead Dancer	Circle in the Square Theatre • Broadway
2021	Oklahoma!	Laurey Williams	National Tour
2024-25	Gypsy	Swing • u/s June • u/s Agnes	Majestic Theatre • Broadway

=== Film ===
Year	Title	Role	Notes
2017	The Vanishing of Sidney Hall	Harold's secretary	
2020	Hamilton	Ensemble • Dolly	Filmed recording of 2016 Broadway musical

=== Television ===
Year	Title	Role	Notes
2013	Smash	Dancer	Five episodes
2016	Blue Bloods	Ariel Rice	Episode: "The Price Of Justice"
2017	Master of None	Amelia	Episode: "New York, I Love You"
2018	Jessica Jones	Kourtney	Episode: "AKA I Want Your Cray Cray"
2018	The Dangerous Book for Boys	Annie Tran	Episode: "How to Play Poker"
2019	Fosse/Verdon	Dancer	Episode: "Life is a Cabaret"
2020	The Bold Type	Colleen	Episode: "5, 6, 7, 8"
2021	Run the World	Hope	Episodes: "What You Wish For", "Almost, Lady, Almost!"
2025	Demascus	Budhi	Recurring role
