= Warriors (Lin-Manuel Miranda and Eisa Davis album) =

2024 concept album

Studio album by Lin-Manuel Miranda and Eisa Davis
- Released: October 18, 2024
- Genres: Musical theater, popular music
- Length: 80:25
- Label: Atlantic Records
- Producer: Mike Elizondo

Lin-Manuel Miranda chronology
Hamilton: The German EP (2023)	Warriors (2024)	Mufasa: The Lion King (2024)

Warriors is a concept album by Lin-Manuel Miranda and Eisa Davis, inspired by the 1979 action film The Warriors, which adapted the 1965 novel of the same name by Sol Yurick, which was inspired by Xenophon's 4th-century B.C. Anabasis. It was released on October 18, 2024, produced by Mike Elizondo and executive-produced by Nas. Blending hip-hop, musical theater, and various styles that reflect New York City's diversity, Warriors reimagines the story with a gender-flipped perspective. It follows an all-female gang navigating a treacherous journey through the city after the murder of a gang leader, drawing inspiration from real-life events like the 1971 Hoe Avenue peace meeting and addressing themes of misogyny.

Though initially rumored to be part of a planned stage musical, Miranda and Davis clarified that Warriors was conceived as a standalone musical work. Miranda stated that treating the project as an album rather than a stage production allowed him to work with some of his "dream collaborators" who could not commit to a Broadway schedule. Warriors features a diverse group of artists, including hip-hop figures Lauryn Hill, Busta Rhymes, Ghostface Killah, and RZA, as well as Latin musician Marc Anthony and dancehall singer Shenseea. The album also includes performances from Broadway and film stars Amber Gray, Colman Domingo, Billy Porter, Sasha Hutchings, Phillipa Soo, Joshua Henry, and Jasmine Cephas Jones. The album peaked at number 21 on Billboard's Top Current Albums chart, and at 29 on the UK Album Downloads chart.

Following its release, Miranda and Davis confirmed plans to develop a stage adaptation. In 2026, the stage adaptation was announced to premiere in 2027 on Broadway at the Lunt-Fontanne Theatre.

== Background ==
The American composer, lyricist, and playwright Lin-Manuel Miranda first saw the movie The Warriors (1979) at age four on a VHS videocassette and, according to him, the story has been "on two stone tablets in [his] head" since then. In 2009, shortly after Miranda's stage musical In the Heights opened on Broadway, his friend Phil Westgren suggested their future musical should be based on The Warriors. Miranda initially told Westgren the idea would never work, but after his first run of Hamilton performances, he realized he had been thinking about adapting The Warriors since then. In 2022, Miranda proposed a collaboration on the project to playwright and actress Eisa Davis, who had never seen the movie.

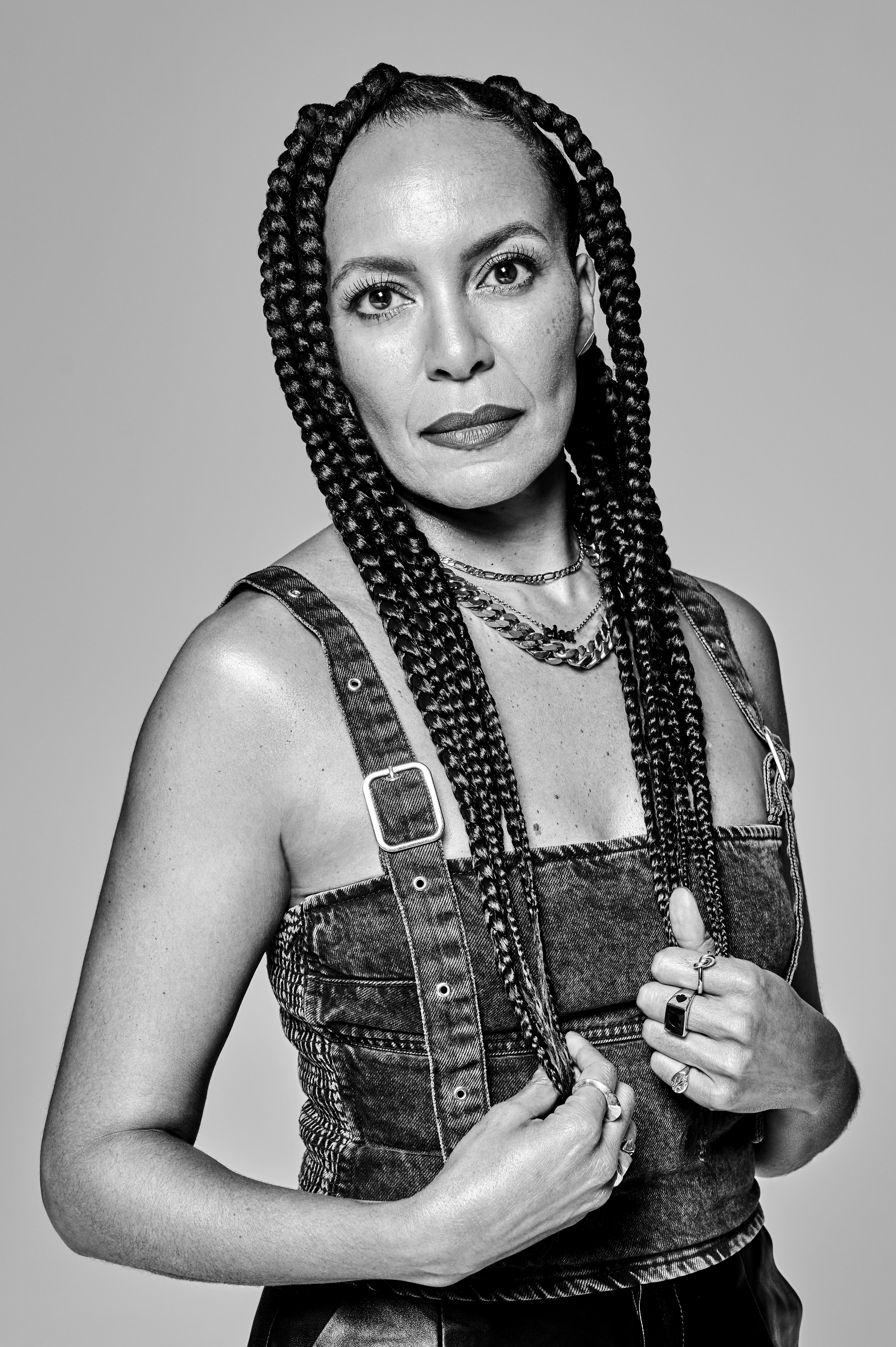
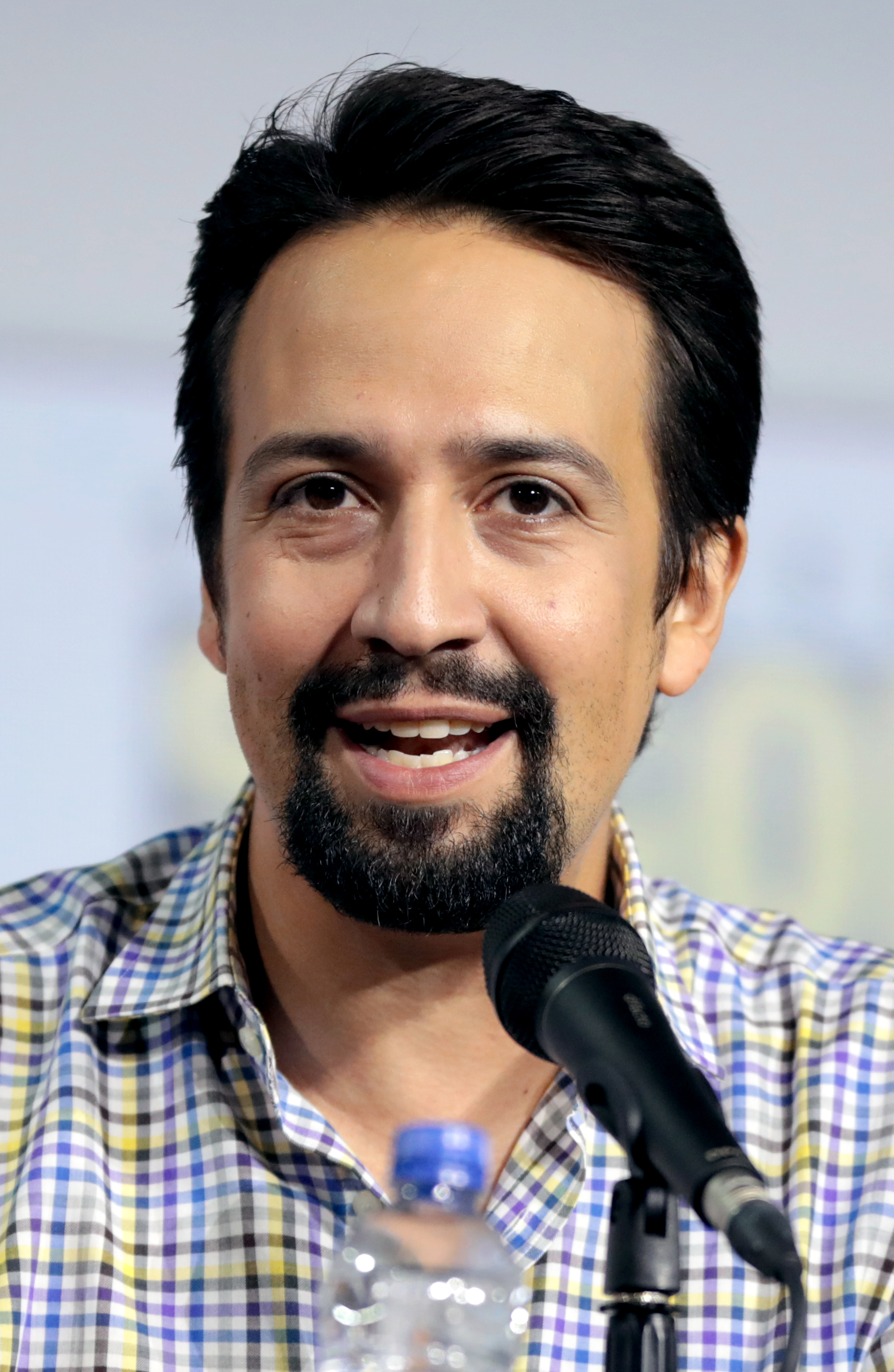
Warriors co-writers Eisa Davis (left, 2024) and Lin-Manuel Miranda (2019)

In August 2023, New York Post was the first media outlet to report Miranda was working on a stage musical adaptation of Sol Yurick's 1965 novel The Warriors. In July 2024, it was reported Miranda was completing the recording of a concept album for a new musical adaptation of the eponymous movie.

In August 2024, the album's release date was confirmed. The New York Times, however, said it was unclear whether the album would lead to a stage musical, while the Los Angeles Times described earlier reports about the stage production of Warriors as "speculation". The New York Times explained their position by comparing Warriors to Hamilton, which was "initially conceived as a concept album, and there is a history of concept albums evolving into stage productions, from Jesus Christ Superstar to Hadestown". Logan Culwell-Block, writing for Playbill, commented that treating the work primarily as an album might be helpful because some aspects of the Warriors story, such as the fight sequences and numerous location changes, are not things musicals on traditional proscenium stages are known for doing well. Following the album's release, Miranda and Davis downplayed immediate plans for a stage production, noting they did not have a theatrical producer or director attached, and choosing instead to focus on the album as the project's main goal. Davis also ruled out the possibility of adapting the album into a film, saying that the story has already been in that medium, and the album is a love letter to the film.

== Concept and storyline ==
Warriors gender-flips the characters of the movie that inspired it. Miranda has said this approach was key to an interesting adaptation, explaining that a story with female characters complicated the narrative in a way that made it more compelling. Davis has characterized the flip as a revolutionary and a feminist act, given overtones in the movie that she described as misogynist and homophobic.

The 2014–2015 misogynistic online harassment campaign Gamergate was part of Miranda's inspiration for the gender flip. He compared the campaign's doxing of women to Luther's false accusation in The Warriors, noting that Luther shoots Cyrus and then blames the Warriors, forcing them to deal with the consequences. Davis also found inspiration in the 1971 Hoe Avenue peace meeting, a historical inter-gang truce that took place in the Bronx. Women were marginalized and excluded from the meeting; she described the album as "a vindication" for them.

Eisa Davis describes Warriors as a "love letter to the origins of hip-hop". She again connected the story of Warriors to the Hoe Avenue peace meeting, which she said enabled the cultural conditions for the creation of hip-hop in the early 1970s, marking a shift from gangs fighting with each other to competitions between crews of MCs and dancers. When she first watched the 1979 movie with Miranda, she only knew of it because it had been referenced in hip-hop. Vulture said the movie's "unforgettable lines echo across hip-hop history". It gave examples like the line "I be like, 'Warriors, come out and play'", rapped by Ol' Dirty Bastard on Wu-Tang Clan's debut album, and the video for California Love by 2Pac featuring Dr. Dre, starting with "Can you dig it?" as spoken by Cyrus.

=== Plot ===
DJ Lynne Pen broadcasts to New York City's gangs, announcing a gathering at Van Cortlandt Park organized by Cyrus of the Gramercy Riffs ("Survive the Night"). The Warriors, an all-women gang from Coney Island, follow Cyrus's instructions to leave their weapons behind and head uptown ("Roll Call"). At the park, they perform a freestyle rap to their signature beat ("Warriors' Cypher"). Cyrus arrives ("Make Way for Cyrus") and calls for a gang truce to ensure peace ("If You Can Count"). While her message gains support, Luther of the Rogues kills Cyrus and blames Cleon, the Warriors' leader and the only witness. As the Riffs attack Cleon, she orders the Warriors to flee ("Derailed"). With Cleon missing, Swan takes charge, frustrating Ajax. They plan to regroup at Union Square Station if they are separated and start the journey home ("Woodlawn Cemetery").

The DJ announces that the truce has been broken and a hit placed on the Warriors. They escape an attack by the Turnbull AC's in the Bronx and board a train ("Leave the Bronx Alive"), but a track fire forces them to continue on foot. Luther informs the Rogues of his plan to pin the murder on the Warriors ("A Track Fire and a Phone Call") and shares his plan to "watch the world burn" with fellow Rogue Cropsy ("Going Down"). The Warriors encounter the Orphans and feign weakness so that they will be allowed to pass through. Mercy, the girlfriend of the Orphans' leader Sully, disrupts this by mocking Sully for falling for the Warriors' act and demanding Swan's vest. When the Warriors refuse, the Orphans prepare to attack. Swan and Ajax throw a Molotov cocktail, scaring off the Orphans ("Orphan Town"). Impressed, Mercy leaves the Orphans to join the Warriors ("Call Me Mercy"). Meanwhile, Cleon convinces the new Riffs leader Masai to investigate the real killer ("Still Breathin'").

The House of Hurricanes, a ballroom group from Spanish Harlem, stop the Warriors and accuse them of killing Cyrus. Convinced of their innocence, they let them go but warn them that running makes them look guilty and that they must fight to survive ("Quiet Girls"). The Warriors stop at Gray's Papaya, but Swan urges them to stay focused. The Baseball Furies, a West Side gang, attack ("Outside Gray's Papaya"). Tired of running, Ajax rallies the Warriors to fight back in Riverside Park ("Sick of Runnin'"). Fired up from the fight, Ajax assaults a man catcalling them. The man then reveals himself to be an undercover cop, and arrests Ajax while the Warriors flee. While fleeing, Mercy and Swan are separated from the rest of the gang ("The Park at Night"). Luther and Cropsy mock the Warriors' predicament ("Luther Interlude").

At Union Square, the Warriors meet the Bizzies, a cardigan-wearing gang offering shelter in their East Village apartment. Cochise, Cowgirl, and Fox accept, but Rembrandt is wary ("We Got You"). Meanwhile, Mercy asks to become a Warrior. Swan admits to a romantic interest in her but refuses her advances ("A Light or Somethin'"). At the Bizzies' apartment, Rembrandt realizes they are planning an ambush and convinces the Warriors to escape ("We Got You (Reprise)"). Cleon convinces the Riffs that Cyrus's killer is likely in Coney Island ("Somewhere in the City"). Swan and Mercy reunite with the Warriors at Union Square, but police interrupt their attempt to board a train. Fox distracts the police captain by causing a fight on the platform, allowing the others to escape, but she is thrown onto the tracks and killed by an oncoming train ("Reunion Square").

Shaken, the Warriors return to Coney Island in silence. As the DJ narrates the lives of fellow passengers, Mercy and Swan share a kiss ("Same Train Home"). Upon arrival, they mourn their lost members and induct Mercy into the group. They spot Luther approaching in a hearse ("Finale Part I: The Wonder Wheel"). Swan leads them to confront Luther on the beach, challenging him to a duel. Luther draws his gun but is disarmed by Swan. The Rogues abandon their leader, and the Riffs arrive. Cleon identifies Luther as Cyrus's killer, and Masai commends the Warriors for their bravery before the Riffs attack Luther ("Finale Part II: The Coney Island Shore"). Cleon rejoins the Warriors, and they express hope that Cyrus's dream of peace will one day be realized ("Finale Part III: When We All Come Home Alive").

== Writing and composition ==
Miranda told the theater magazine Playbill: "The album says 'by both of us', and it really is by both of us"; both Miranda and Davis are credited as its authors without delineation of their roles. According to Miranda: "pretty much every Warriors bassline" started as a voice memo from Davis to him. One such voice memo appears six seconds into the album's first track as its first sung material. Davis has said that their collaboration allowed the pair to develop an artistic relationship that felt like they were family, and that it was "almost like [they] shared a brain".

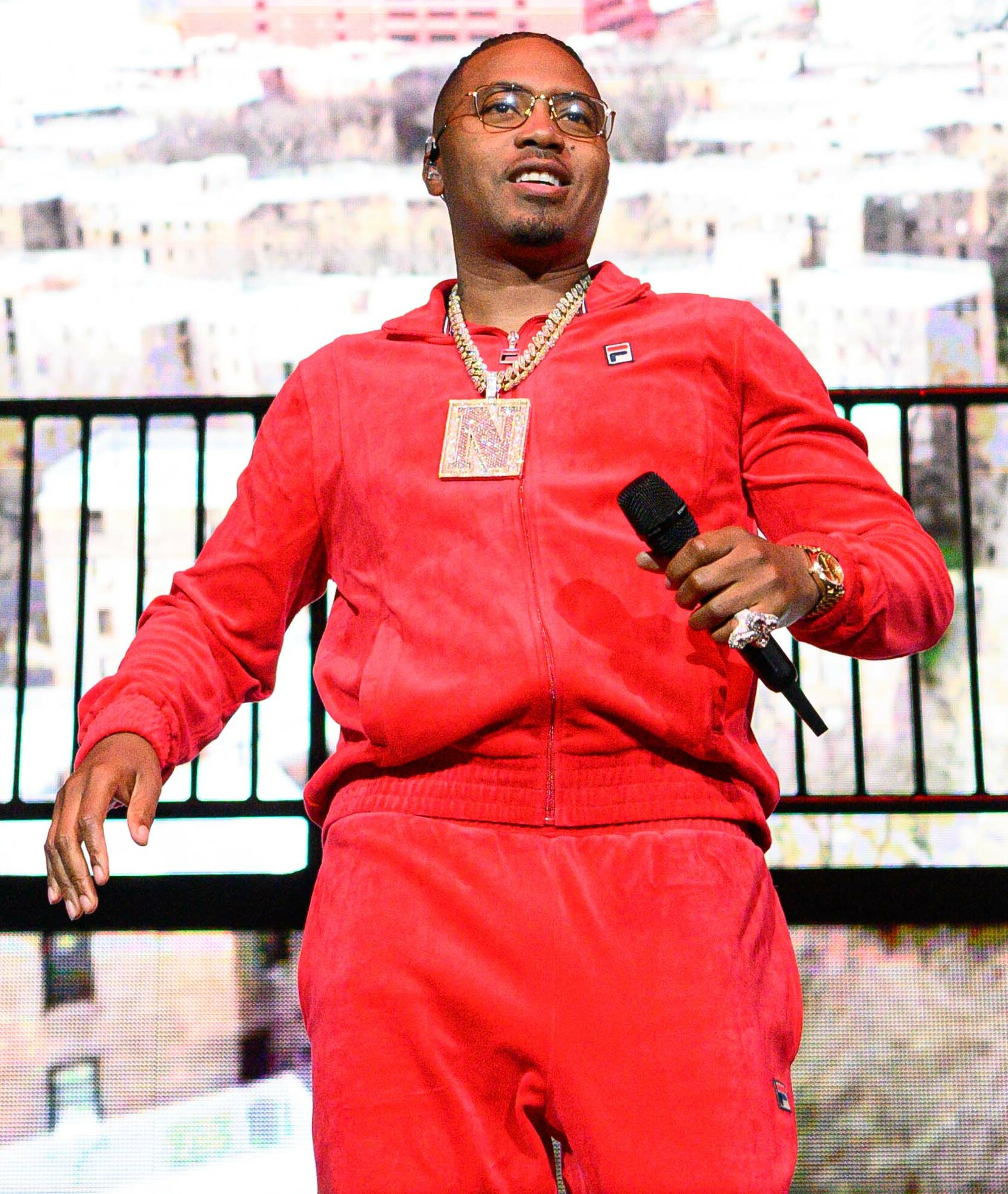
Warriors' voice of Queens and executive producer Nas performing in 2022

On Warriors, each of New York City's five boroughs is represented by a well-known rap artist. Miranda has said it was very intimidating to write verses for people he saw among "the greatest writers". Davis has said that, while the raps were written specifically for each performer's own rhythms, there was still a question of whether they would be able to perform someone else's lines, as they take pride in never having been ghostwritten. According to Miranda, the performers had to make a mindset shift in recognizing they were playing a role, not themselves, but that they could still "bring what we love about them as emcees to the table". Miranda has said that one of his proudest moments as a lyricist was getting Nas' approval for a verse based on a recording of Miranda himself performing the lines. While writing the verse, Miranda wondered whether he could find a Queens metaphor Nas had not already used, and ultimately settled on a chess reference, "Queen's Gambit".

During the writing process, Miranda swapped early demos with Andy Samberg, who was working on The Unauthorized Bash Brothers Experience. Miranda and Samberg had met on the set of Brooklyn Nine-Nine and realized they were both working on concept albums about what Miranda described as "weird super-niche [19]80s things", and Warriors turned out to be "weirdly" similar to Bash Brothers.

Some tracks were written as a broader collaboration with the album's band as part of jam sessions at the Tennessee home of the album's producer Mike Elizondo, whom Miranda described as his and Eisa Davis's "third collaborator". South Korean-born composer Helen Park contributed a line in Korean to the K-pop-inspired track "We Got You", which was written by her under Miranda's guidance. He wanted the song to be "the come on to end all come-ons" and to sneak in the phrase "you killed our hope". He told Billboard that Korean speakers would get an early clue to the "nefarious" side of the Bizzies gang.

== Recording, production and musical style ==
Davis, Elizondo, and Miranda spent two weeks at a studio in Nashville, Tennessee, recording the album after having earlier recorded demos in upstate New York. Miranda said that a musical theater writer would normally only be in the studio when it was time to make the cast album of the stage show, so it was "an indulgence [...] to just really focus on the songs and how they sound and not worry about staging".

Miranda has said that a further benefit of approaching the project as an album, rather than a stage show, was that it allowed him to work with artists he would not otherwise be able to. He said some of his "dream collaborators" would never commit to a Broadway schedule of performing eight times a week, but could spend a couple of days in a studio. Most of the album's vocals were recorded at the Power Station recording studio in Manhattan. Marc Anthony recorded his vocals in Miami, and other recordings were made in Los Angeles.

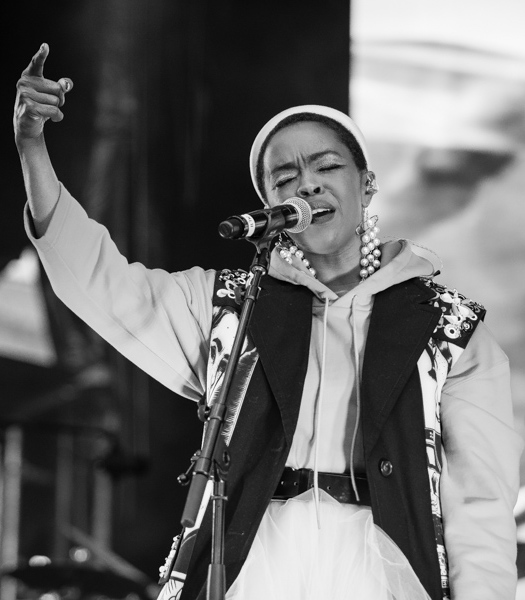
Lauryn Hill, who played the role of Cyrus, performing in 2019

Lauryn Hill's vocals for "If You Can Count" were recorded separately from the rest of the album at an unknown location. Miranda and Davis had written to Hill, providing her with the track and a demo vocal, explaining why she was their only choice for the role of Cyrus. During a photography shoot a year later, Miranda received a text message from Hill's management with a Dropbox link to a file containing Hill's vocals. Miranda immediately went to a changing room to listen to the song. Hill added her own harmonies, and is credited as a co-producer on the track.

Miranda, as another addition to Warriors, made a voice recording of his children when they bothered him at home during his work on the album. His six-year-old son Francisco gave a 20-second scream, which is used in a loop with reverb on "Derailed". Miranda described the scream as providing "the harmonic backbone of the track". His nine-year-old son Sebastian whispers "run" at the end of the same track.

The voices of Miranda and Davis themselves both also appear on the album, though Miranda has not confirmed exactly where his can be heard. In addition to Davis' early voice memo recording, used as a horn line in the opening song, she has a spoken line elsewhere on the album.

In addition to his performing role, Nas is credited as an executive producer of the album, alongside Miranda, Davis, and Craig Kallman. Elizondo commented on the importance of Nas's role as executive producer, explaining that the credibility he brought helped encourage the participation of artists who might otherwise have felt out of their comfort zone. Other credits on the album include mastering by Chris Gehringer, and Pete Ganbarg as A&R.

Style-wise, Associated Press places Warriors "at the intersection of musical theater and popular music" with touches from a wide range of genres like "a diverse buffet" reflecting the city of New York. Billboard also describes the album as "genre-hopping". Michael Paulson, a theater reporter at The New York Times, lists the album's genres as "rap and hip-hop, salsa and merengue, ska and sounds from ballroom culture, R&B and funk". Moreover, he finds nods to K-pop ("We Got You"), and dancehall (Shenseea's vocals on "Survive the Night"). Davis has said of the album's incorporation of diverse genres: "We really wanted to be able to express the multiple New Yorks inside of New York. We wanted to be able to speak to the different cultural influences that are there. And we wanted to just have the fun of having our palette be as wide as possible."

Warriors also includes elements of metal music for the character Luther, who is voiced by Kim Dracula. Miranda initially tried writing rap verses for Luther, attempting to match rhythms to the character's thinking patterns as he had done in Hamilton, but found rap to be too methodical and organized. Eisa played Miranda some music by the metal band Alekhine's Gun and they chose this sound for its "chaotic energy".

== Release ==
Warriors was released on October 18, 2024, with a launch party at Brooklyn's Time Out Market before its midnight release to streaming services. At the party, Time Out unveiled a digital magazine cover that included a photograph of Miranda and Davis in the subway car that was used in the 1979 film and is now housed in New York Transit Museum.

In December 2024, in an interview with The New York Times following the release of Mufasa: The Lion King, Miranda said he and Davis were planning to start discussions about a stage adaptation in early 2025, saying: "People really like [the album], but because we're such a visual culture, everyone said to me and Eisa 'OK, when can we see it?' So I think at the top of the year, Eisa and I will just start having conversations about how to adapt that to the stage."

In 2026, the stage adaptation of Warriors was announced to premiere in 2027 on Broadway at the Lunt-Fontanne Theatre, across the street from Miranda's Hamilton at the Richard Rodgers. The production is set to be co-directed by Jenny Koons and Andy Blankenbuehler, with the latter also serving as choreographer.

== Reception ==
Professional ratings
Review scores
Source	Rating
Financial Times	4/5 stars
The Guardian	5/5 stars

In his review for The Guardian, Chris Wiegand highlights "unexpected pairings", especially the pairings that match musical theater stars with acts from other genres, in particular citing Alex Boniello's and Kim Dracula's duet on "Going Down". Wiegand also favorably singles out the "poignant yearning" of Julia Harriman's performance on "Call Me Mercy" that gives the character a larger role, compared to her appearance in the film where she is "reduced to a love interest". The use of lines from the screenplay in the lyrics of "If You Can Count" is praised for building them "into something much more resonant". Financial Times's reviewer Ludovic Hunter-Tilney deems the role of the radio DJ to be a lesser version of the "ancient Greek chorus" performance from the film, but praises "droll embellishments" like "the cringy ska-pop sung by dweebish loser gang the Orphans".

Carl Wilson's review at Slate states the album "pulls too many punches", criticizing the action scenes for lacking menace and saying the album seems "sealed inside a nicey-nice musical-theater bubble". He gives examples of the Warriors' easy acceptance of Swan and Mercy's "queer love", and the fact the story features only a single gun, which "doesn't feel like it has anything to do with gang life now". According to Wilson, Miranda's and Davis's storytelling feels restricted by 2024 politics, "as if there's so much they cannot say, so much that many people really feel we can't discuss right now lest it be seized on and misused in bad faith". Similarly, Hunter-Tilney thinks the album puts the 1979 "macho flick" film into a "wokehold", but to good effect, further explaining that the film's gang violence is largely a "cartoon fantasy", and so the story's "transformation into a girl-power parable is hardly a leap".

Both Wilson and Craig Jenkins of Vulture have mixed feelings about the album's big-name guest rappers. Wilson believes they should have made appearances beyond the first track, with Vulture adding that spreading out these cameos may have helped prevent the album from being seen by rap fans as "nuclear-grade cringe". Moreover, Wilson writes that Miranda benefits from the second-hand credibility these artists bring because his version of hip-hop "smacks of corniness to those who aren't already musical-theater fans".

Jenkins writes that Warriors showcases many of Miranda's positive traits as a songwriter, but also less positive "quirks" that are "sources of the deserved gripes against him". According to Jenkins, Miranda is "plagued by" "occasional G-rated schmaltz", and tends toward an "overbearing maximalism and good-intentioned liberalism", which can sometimes "wring an uplifting takeaway from an objectively bleak situation".

== Track listing ==
All tracks are written by Lin-Manuel Miranda and Eisa Davis. "We Got You" was written with Helen Park.

No.	Title	Performer(s)	Length
1.	"Survive the Night"	Shenseea; Chris Rivers; Nas; Cam'ron; Ghostface Killah; RZA; Busta Rhymes	4:16
2.	"Roll Call"	Aneesa Folds; Kenita Miller; Sasha Hutchings; Phillipa Soo; Amber Gray; Gizel Jiménez; Jasmine Cephas-Jones; Shenseea; Bernie Wagenblast	2:53
3.	"Warriors' Cypher"	Miller; Hutchings; Soo; Folds; Gray; Jiménez; Cephas-Jones	0:52
4.	"Make Way for Cyrus"	Hutchings; Colman Domingo	0:46
5.	"If You Can Count"	Ms. Lauryn Hill	3:24
6.	"Derailed"	Folds; Miller; Hutchings; Kim Dracula; Alex Boniello; Cephas-Jones; Gray; David Patrick Kelly; Soo; Jiménez	2:26
7.	"Woodlawn Cemetery"	Cephas-Jones; Hutchings; Miller; Soo; Jiménez; Gray	2:36
8.	"Leave the Bronx Alive"	Marc Anthony; Luis Figueroa; Flaco Navaja; Shenseea; José Alberto "El Canario"; Wagenblast	3:33
9.	"A Track Fire and a Phone Call"	Hutchings; Gray; Miller; Soo; Jiménez; Cephas-Jones; Dracula; Boniello; Wagenblast	2:26
10.	"Going Down"	Dracula; Boniello	2:36
11.	"Orphan Town"	Utkarsh Ambudkar; Casey Likes; Julia Harriman; Jiménez; Soo; Cephas-Jones; Gray; Miller; Hutchings	4:31
12.	"Call Me Mercy"	Harriman	2:05
13.	"Still Breathin'"	Domingo; Folds	2:52
14.	"Quiet Girls"	Michaela Jaé; Billy Porter; Mykal Kilgore	3:09
15.	"Outside Gray's Papaya"	Soo; Miller; Hutchings; Gray; Cephas-Jones; Jiménez; Harriman; Shenseea	2:08
16.	"Sick of Runnin'"	Gray; Miller; Hutchings; Harriman; Soo; Jiménez; Cephas-Jones	3:03
17.	"The Park at Night"	James Remar; Miller; Harriman; Hutchings; Soo; Cephas-Jones; Gray; Jiménez	2:50
18.	"Luther Interlude"	Dracula; Boniello	1:26
19.	"Cardigans"	Miller; Hutchings; Soo; Jiménez; Joshua Henry; Daniel Jikal; Stephen Sanchez; Timothy Hughes; Wagenblast	0:58
20.	"We Got You"	Sanchez; Henry; Hughes; Jikal	2:54
21.	"A Light or Somethin'"	Harriman; Cephas-Jones	3:29
22.	"We Got You (Reprise)"	Sanchez; Henry; Hughes; Jikal; Soo; Miller; Hutchings; Jiménez	3:36
23.	"Somewhere in the City"	Domingo; Folds	1:57
24.	"Reunion Square"	Shenseea; Miller; Hutchings; Soo; Jiménez; Harriman; Cephas-Jones; Kelly; DJ Reborn; Wagenblast	6:42
25.	"Same Train Home"	Shenseea	4:49
26.	"Finale; Part 1: Wonder Wheel; Part 2: The Coney Island Shore; Part 3: When We All Come Home Alive"	Miller; Hutchings; Harriman; Jiménez; Cephas-Jones; Dracula; Boniello; Domingo; Folds	8:08
Total length:			01:20:25

== Personnel ==
Featured on the album are:

The Warriors

- Aneesa Folds as Cleon
- Amber Gray as Ajax
- Sasha Hutchings as Cowgirl
- Gizel Jiménez as Rembrandt
- Jasmine Cephas Jones as Swan
- Kenita Miller as Cochise
- Phillipa Soo as Fox
- Julia Harriman as Mercy

The Rogues

- Alex Boniello as Cropsy
- Kim Dracula as Luther

The Gramercy Riffs

- Lauryn Hill as Cyrus
- Colman Domingo as Masai

The Turnbull AC's

- Marc Anthony as Tato
- Luis Figueroa as Miguel
- Flaco Navaja as Jesús

The Orphans

- Utkarsh Ambudkar as Sully
- Casey Likes as Jesse

The Hurricanes

- Billy Porter as Granger
- Michaela Jaé as Yaya
- Mykal Kilgore as Élan

The Bizzies

- Joshua Henry as Wanya
- Timothy Hughes as Lance
- Daniel Jikal as Joon
- Stephen Sanchez as Cal
New York's Finest
- David Patrick Kelly (Note: Kelly portrayed Luther in the 1979 film.) as Victor
- James Remar (Note: In the 1979 film Remar played Ajax. His character on the album arrests Ajax.) as Barnes

New York boroughs

- Busta Rhymes as Brooklyn
- Cam'ron as Manhattan
- Nas as Queens
- Chris Rivers as The Bronx
- Ghostface Killah and RZA as Staten Island

Other

- Shenseea as DJ Lynne Pen
- Bernie Wagenblast as train conductor
- Florencia Cuenca as subway performer

== Charts ==
Chart performance for Warriors
Chart (2024)	Peak position
UK Compilation Albums (Official Charts)	29
UK Album Downloads (Official Charts)	34
US Top Album Sales (Billboard)	24
US Top Current Album Sales (Billboard)	21
