= Road warrior (computing) =

Slang for remote worker

In business travel, a road warrior is a remote worker that uses mobile devices such as tablet computers, laptops, smartphones, and Internet access while traveling to conduct business. The term has often been used with regard to salespeople who travel frequently and who rarely are in the office. Today it is used for anyone who works outside the office and travels for business. Unlike digital nomads, road warriors do not necessarily choose to travel; it is part of their work duties.

== History ==
The term is believed to originate in the Mel Gibson movie Mad Max 2:The Road Warrior (1981).

In the pre-mobile technology era, road warriors were people whose jobs required a lot of travel, either by car or plane. The majority of this group were salespeople and professionals that needed to be with clients like accountants, consultants, etc. They typically would need to return to their company's office for administrative duties. The office held limited resources (phones, fax machine, computers, etc.) that were best used by centralizing them.

As both computer and telecommunication technologies became more portable and less expensive, the need for road warriors to come back to offices for use of limited and costly resources began to wane.

Major technologies that impacted road warriors:

- Internet
- Text pager
- Portable terminal - allowed road warriors to access work computers for the first time.
- Personal computer
- Email - allowed information to move and be seen anywhere
- Portable computers
- Portable cell phone
- Blackberry phone - allowed secure message between users
- Smartphones
- Wireless access (Wi-Fi)

Road warriors use mobile devices and laptop computers that connect to companies' information systems. Specialized applications from software as a service (SaaS) providers are often used in order to conduct their work duties.

=== Culture ===
The term road warrior has been credited to the 1981 movie Mad Max 2 sub-titled "Road Warrior" starring Mel Gibson. Its harsh road life in a post-apocalyptic world was used to symbolize the hardship of modern business travel.

The 2009 movie "Up in the Air" starred George Clooney as a person who fully lives the road warrior life to the extreme.
