= List of Guin Saga episodes =

The anime series Guin Saga is based on the novel series of the same name by Kaoru Kurimoto. The series is directed by Atsushi Wakabayashi, his first directing role, and produced by Satelight. The screenplay for all the episodes was written by Shōji Yonemura, and the entire series was storyboarded by Atsushi Wakabayashi. The episodes follow a mysterious warrior, Guin, who has the head of a leopard. He meets an ousted young prince and princess and helps them, while trying to recover his memories.

Kurimoto had been approached several times to permit an adaptation of Guin Saga but refused, as she felt that the story needed to be live-action and produced with Caucasian actors. On April 12, 2005, Micott & Basara (Japanese investors) announced plans to create an anime based on Guin Saga. On April 3, 2009, an English-dubbed trailer was posted on the anime's official website. The 26 episodes of the Guin Saga anime aired from April 5, 2009 - September 27, 2009, on NHK BS-2. The episodes were later released as 9 DVDs from between July 22, 2009 and March 24, 2010. On May 7, 2010, North American anime licensor Sentai Filmworks announced that they acquired the series. It released the first DVD, comprising the first thirteen episodes, on March 29, 2011, and the second on May 31, 2011.

The anime is scored by Nobuo Uematsu, his first full soundtrack for an anime series. It uses two pieces of theme music. "Theme of Guin" (グインのテーマ, Guin no Tēma) by Nobuo Uematsu is the series' opening theme, while "Saga~This is my road" by Kanon is the series' ending theme.

== Episode list ==
No.	Title	Original release date
1	"The Leopard Mask"; Transliteration: "Hyōtō no Kamen" (Japanese: 豹頭の仮面)	April 5, 2009
After the destruction of the kingdom of Parros, the twins Rinda Farseer and Remus Farseer want to escape to Argos but are accidentally sent to the Roodwood. They are attacked by Mongauli black knights but are saved by Guin, a warrior with a human body but a head of a leopard. After Rinda and Remus treat Guin, they find out that he is amnesiac. The dark spirits of Roodwood attack them at night during a downpour, urging them to escape together through the forest across the River Kes.
2	"The Keep of the Black Count"; Transliteration: "Kuro Hakushaku no Toride" (Japanese: 黒伯爵の砦)	April 12, 2009
The Mongauli soldiers corner and capture Guin and the twins at the other side of the River Kes. After a long march, they are brought to Stafolos Keep to see the Black Count Vanon. He takes interest in the twins, mainly due to the fact that their travel to Roodwood was reached within one day. Vanon attacks them, but Guin intervenes to protect them. Later on, Guin is forced to battle a gray ape monster for Vanon's amusement. Through much struggle and effort, Guin manages to defeat the gray ape monster. However, Guin then has to fight another captive named Istavan Spellsword, also known as the "Crimson Mercenary".
3	"The Crimson Mercenary"; Transliteration: "Kurenai no Yōhei" (Japanese: 紅の傭兵)	April 19, 2009
As Vanon suddenly takes leave, the match between Guin and Istavan is postponed till the next day. Guin and Remus are taken to a cell next to Istavan, who plans to escape at night. Meanwhile, Rinda is sent elsewhere, meeting Suni, a member of the Sem, a monkey-like barbaric tribe, as her cellmate. Come nightfall, the Sem attacks the fortress, giving Istavan the chance to escape. Orro, a young Mongauli soldier, frees Guin and Remus from captivity, but only at the cost of his life. Vanon takes Rinda from her cell into the throne room to suck her blood, revealing himself to be a vampire spirit. Guin soon interrupts and defeats Vanon, causing fire to spread in the area. Guin brings Rinda, Remus, and Suni with him, all jumping into the River Kes from the top of the castle.
4	"Over the River of Death"; Transliteration: "Shi no Kawa o Koete" (Japanese: 死の河を越えて)	April 26, 2009
Guin, Rinda, Remus, Istavan, and Suni have successfully escaped from Stafolos Keep and have made it back across the River Kes safely. During their travels down the dangerous river on a boat, Istavan asks Rinda about the "Shining Lady", saying how she may be connected to his destiny. A sea beast, known as a Big Mouth, charges at the protagonists, yet Guin strikes it with an oar. As the sun begins to set, Mongauli white knights prepare to attack them. However, a second Big Mouth appears but it is digested by a Ringworm, another sea beast. The boat is destroyed as a result, yet the protagonists are able to evade the soldiers and camp out in the woods. Lady Amnelis, general of the Mongauli white knights, is outraged that her squadron failed to ascertain the group. She plans to have nearly a vast number of soldiers track and hunt them down.
5	"Meeting of Fate"; Transliteration: "Shukumei no Deai" (Japanese: 宿命の出会い)	May 3, 2009
Amnelis is allied with Duke Marus, head of the Mongauli blue knights, to be use as reinforcements for her mission. Although Istavan realizes that Rinda and Remus are indeed the heirs of Parros, he decides to stay with them despite the fact. The Mongauli blue knight troops find where Guin and company are. Marus lets Leegan take Guin, Rinda, and Remus hostage, while Istavan and Suni manage to get away. After the ones in hostage are shown to Amnelis, she decides to take them to Alvon Keep. On the way there through a barren desert, some of the troops are wiped out by an earth beast called a Sand Worm, much to Marus's indifference. That night, Istavan frees Guin and the twins by luring a Sand Worm into the military camp. They make their way out together, but they are followed by Astrias, the leader of the Mongauli red knight platoons.
6	"Assembly of the Sem Tribes"; Transliteration: "Semu Zoku no Shūketsu" (Japanese: セム族の集結)	May 10, 2009
Guin has no option other that to stand and fight. He lets Istavan and the twins go on ahead while he doubles back to take on an entire legion of soldiers. Soon after, Suni and her tribe arrive to lend a hand. Istavan meets face to face with Astrias, but Guin saves Istavan, causing Astrias to fall back. Their victory may be short lived as the entire Mongauli army are preparing for a full scale invasion of Nospherus. Guin and Istavan meet up with Rinda, Remus, and Suni at the Raku Village, receiving welcome from Loto, the chieftain of the Raku Village. Gathering the other tribe chieftains to inform them of the next move of the Mongauli army, Guin tries to convince them to join forces in an attempt to take down the army.
7	"The Battle of Nospherus"; Transliteration: "Nosuferasu no Tatakai" (Japanese: ノスフェラスの戦い)	May 17, 2009
The battle has begun when the Sem briefly ambush the Mongauli army in a valley, all according to Guin's plan. The Sem then are called to retreat, as the numerical superiority of the Mongauli army seems like an insurmountable obstacle. However, Guin's decisive strategies allow the Sem to even the odds. The Sem later awakens the Yidoh, a slimy earth beast, to engulf much of the army, including Leegan. As Amnelis is told that fire would repel the Yidoh, even that is not enough to stop it from devouring more soldiers.
8	"Encounter with the Wolf King"; Transliteration: "Ōkamiō to no Deai" (Japanese: 狼王との出会い)	May 24, 2009
Istavan, disguised as a Mongauli soldier, manages to infiltrate the ranks of the Mongauli blue knights, to gain Marus's trust, in preparation for the next stage of Guin's offensive. Meanwhile, as the Sem prepare for the coming battle, Guin himself goes in search of the Lagon, said to be a mythical tribe, to recruit them to his cause, despite Rinda and Remus's objections. However, the Sem can only hold out against the Mongauli army for four days, so Guin must return within that time. Guin travels on a treacherous path to lead him toward the mountain pass, shortly befriending the Wolf King, alpha of its pack, along the way. He finds an artifact hidden inside a large rock Guin later part ways with the Wolf King and continues on, only to be stopped by one of the tribesmen of Lagon.
9	"Prisoner of the Lagon"; Transliteration: "Ragon no Ryoshū" (Japanese: ラゴンの虜囚)	May 31, 2009
Guin is captured and put into a cavern. When he is brought before Dodok the Brave and Kah the Wise, respectively the warrior hero and the elder sage of the Lagon, he claims to be sent by their god named Akira. This angers the Lagon, and he eventually is sentenced to face Dodok in a match, which Kah approves of. If Guin manages to defeat this hero, they will recognize him as a messenger of their god. However, if he loses, his life is forfeited. Istavan lures Marus into a Sem ambush, where Marus is killed by being covered in a flood of oil and set on fire. Guin hold the artifact as it shines brightly in front of the Lagon, thereby being a sign that Akira is present within him. He requests the Lagon to aide him in the war against the Mongauli soldiers.
10	"The Frontier King"; Transliteration: "Henkyō no Ōja" (Japanese: 辺境の王者)	June 7, 2009
Istavan reunites with Rinda, Remus, and Suni. However, The Mongauli find out the hiding place of the Sem and surround them at night while they are sleeping. The Sem are surprised by this attack, and, after a short fight, they try to flee. Suni falls into the pits of the canyon when trying to protect Rinda and Remus from Astrias. Luckily, Istavan prevents Astrias from harming the twins. With the Mongauli army pursuing the Sem, all seems lost. At that moment, Guin arrives with the Lagon and counters the Mongauli, causing them to retreat. Suni is revealed to have survived, and Guin thanks Istavan for watching over the twins.
11	"Warriors"; Transliteration: "Senshitachi" (Japanese: 戦士たち)	June 14, 2009
The defeated Amnelis returns to her father, where she learns that her father has a marriage planned for her, much to her dismay. Aldo Norisse manages to enter Crystal, with the help of a travelling merchant Lunan and his daughter Rigea, as the city gate is guarded by Mongauli soldiers. Guin prepares to depart from Nospherus, saying that he does not need the assistance of the Sem or the Lagon any longer, and battles Dodok to a second match to prove his strength. At night, Norisse is taken captive by the Mongauli white knights, as a female spy ratted him out for his arrival.
12	"A New Destiny"; Transliteration: "Aratanaru Unmei" (Japanese: 新たなる運命)	June 21, 2009
Norisse has been captured by the Mongauli white knights, prompting the survivors of the Parros royal family and those tribes that oppose Mongauli to prepare for war. Meanwhile, as Amnelis heads to Crystal to marry Norisse and legitimize the claim of Mongaul to the kingdom, Astrias decides to prevent the wedding at any cost. He meets a minstrel name Malius, who seems to know much about Norisse. However, the latter gases him, revealed that he has an alias. Back in Nospherus, Guin, Rinda, Remus, Istavan, and Suni prepare to leave and continue on their journey towards the Town of Ross. At the engagement party, a bothered Amnelis lays eyes on Norisse for the first time, instantly falling in love, but she walks away with mixed feelings. After Remus has visions of a mysterious corpse man during the day and a ball of light shooting out flying disks at night, he wants to find out the interpretation to what he saw.
13	"To The Sea"; Transliteration: "Umi e" (Japanese: 海へ)	June 28, 2009
Although Amnelis sees herself as the "Lady of Ice" for her cold personality, Norisse views her to be the "Shining Lady" for her natural beauty. Astrias is captured by Malius, who interrogates him for information regarding the missing twins. To win her over, Norisse shows Amnelis inside a chamber which contains a device capable of teleportation. After he threatens to beam her to someplace unknown, she gives in and kisses him, thereby setting his elaborate plan into motion. Guin and the others finally arrive at the Town of Ross and prepare to cross the Sea of Lent by ship. However, their plans of reaching Argos are put in jeopardy when it is declared that Mongaul and Argos are at war.
14	"Shining Sea, Shining Lady"; Transliteration: "Hikari no Fune, Hikari no Kōjo" (Japanese: 光の船、光の公女)	July 5, 2009
Guin and the others run into trouble on the Garm's Head when they are double crossed by the ship's captain. Things get worse when a storm damages the ship and washes Guin overboard leaving Istavan, Suni, and the twins to fend for themselves against the ship's crew. Meanwhile, Astrias, arriving in Crystal, and encounters the sorcerer Valerius, who uses his magic to get past the guarded gate. Remus sprays oil on the ship's crew, demanding to transport him and the others safely to Argos, lest they be burned into flames. Rigea visits Norisse to discuss her current position to be a double agent as a soldier of the Mongauli black knights.
15	"Reunion"; Transliteration: "Saikai" (Japanese: 再会)	July 12, 2009
Istavan, Suni, and the twins take their chance to escape from the Garm's Head and end up on a mysterious desert island at night. However, the ship's crew follow them the next morning and things look bleak until Guin appears in order to defend his comrades. In Argos, Duke Scaal and his forces head to Ruan Oasis to join up with Duke Bek in preparation for the coming battle against Kualos. In Crystal, Lunan begins to question Norisse's motives for marrying Amnelis.
16	"The Quickening"; Transliteration: "Taidō" (Japanese: 胎動)	July 19, 2009
While exploring a mysterious cave on the island, Guin and the others encounter a strange ball of light that temporarily renders Rinda unconscious. As they attempt to flee from the orb, they are attacked by a giant monster but manage to escape to the Garm's Head and flee the island. Meanwhile, Archduke Vlad, concerned with the upcoming wedding for his daughter Amnelis, plots to eliminate Norisse from the throne, requesting Mial to do the job. Also troubled by the escape of the twins, Vlad dispatches Shidoh to locate them as quickly as possible. Malius is brought over by Count Junas to play a song for Mial in hopes to cheer him up. As Guin and company travel across the sea, they are met by a military vessel from Agraya.
17	"Farewell My Beloved (Part 1)"; Transliteration: "Saraba Itoshiki Hito yo (Zenpen)" (Japanese: さらば愛しきひとよ（前編）)	July 26, 2009
Marius continues to grow closer to Mial, which makes the task of assassinating the young prince all too difficult. Instead, he decides on a daring plan to assassinate the archduke instead. Valerius, telling Lord Reenas that Norisse would be the archduke of Crystal if both Vlad and Mial are killed, figures out a way to have Norisse murdered first. As the day of the wedding approaches, the opposing schemes finally come to fruition. However, Norisse is no fool and has made preparations of his own.
18	"Farewell My Beloved (Part 2)"; Transliteration: "Saraba Itoshiki Hito yo (Kōhen)" (Japanese: さらば愛しきひとよ（後編）)	August 2, 2009
Mial is killed by Loluka, but a highly upset Junas blames Malius for this crime. Malius stabs Junas in the chest, not long before some Mongauli white knights bear witness. On the day of the wedding, Norisse is apparently assassinated by Astrias, much to Amnelis's grievance. Loluka wants Malius to return to Crystal, but Malius decides to choose his own path. Amnelis is informed of Mial's death, urging her to depart from the palace for good. Norisse, revealed to still be alive, helps Atrias escape from prison. All of what has been happening is an elaborate plan by Norisse and his followers in order to hasten the recapturing of Crystal and the liberation of Parros.
19	"Mirage"; Transliteration: "Shinkirō" (Japanese: 蜃気楼)	August 9, 2009
Having been delivered safely to the Agraya royal palace by the passing vessel, Remus asks Volgo Valen to lend him a squadron of soldiers to accompany the group to Argos in exchange for being betrothed to Almeena. Caaslon, shocked to see Norisse still alive and well, is forced to work for Norisse and marry Rigea. This will be part of the plan for Norisse to reclaim Parros. The twins and the others are finally able to reach Argos, meeting with Queen Emu and King Stakku, respectively their aunt and uncle. Meanwhile, Scaal leads his troops through the Wyren Mountains in order to launch a surprise attack and retake Parros. Istavan takes Rinda across the plain to show her a mirage of a palace before sunset. The difference in social status between Rinda and Istavan has become a problem for the young lovers, and Istavan decides to leave in order to make a name for himself.
20	"The Crimson Secret Messenger"; Transliteration: "Kurenai no Misshi" (Japanese: 紅の密使)	August 16, 2009
Istavan, staying at an inn owned by Milia, is tasked by a male spy with delivering a secret message to Mongaul before he dies. Caaslon realizes that Norisse was right about the Mongauli forces preparing to go to war, so he rejects Taeran's command to join in the battle and chooses to follow along with what Norisse has in store. With Beck and Scaal, along with their troops, trapped in the mountains, Remus himself prepares to lead the forces of Argos into battle. Meanwhile, Guin is attacked by an assassin from Kitai but easily manages to dispatch him. As Istavan leaves Milia for Mongaul, she soon is killed and he shortly becomes pursued.
21	"The Crystal Rebellion"; Transliteration: "Kurisutaru no Hanran" (Japanese: クリスタルの反乱)	August 23, 2009
As most of the Mongauli forces leave Crystal to engage the approaching rebel army, Norisse seizes the opportunity to instigate a revolt and retake the capital. However, Rigea is devastated when Caaslon, whom Taeran saw him to be a traitor, is killed in the battle. Meanwhile, Remus and his men are held up by Kualos's forces and must find a way to end the battle quickly so that he can reach Parros.
22	"The Goddess of Revenge"; Transliteration: "Fukushū no Megami" (Japanese: 復讐の女神)	August 30, 2009
Word reaches Mongaul that the Crystal royal palace has been retaken and that Norisse is still alive. As such, Amnelis reprises her role as the general of the Mongauli white knights and prepares to lead her army to reclaim Parros for herself. Anticipating such an offensive, Scaal orders his men to the border between the two territories. Meanwhile, Istavan arrives in Crystal and delivers his secret message to Norisse. Istavan then becomes a knight under Norisse's direction. Taeran is unexpectedly killed in battle by Valerius disguised as one of the Mongauli white knights. Scaal causes Amnelis to retreat after an embarrassing defeat.
23	"Underneath the Many Stars"; Transliteration: "Ika naru Hoshi no Moto ni" (Japanese: 如何なる星の下に)	September 6, 2009
Norisse, accompanied by Istavan, leads his men to Yuno, where he will join forces with Scaal and prepare for the final invasion of Mongaul. However, the revelation that Rinda might actually want to be with Norisse causes Istavan to reconsider his objectives, and he takes off alone. Meanwhile, after defeating the last of the Kitai assassins, Guin learns that Shidoh is waiting in Toros and may know something about his past, and says his farewell to Rinda, Remus, and Suni.
24	"Mongaul's Final Day"; Transliteration: "Mongōru Saigo no Hi" (Japanese: モンゴール最後の日)	September 13, 2009
Following her father's death, Amnelis is forced to retreat to back to Toros. Unfortunately, Mongaul's former ally Khum has switched allegiances and the princess's fleeing army is trapped between the forces of Parros and Khum. Despite Amnelis's assertion to fight on, the overwhelming odds force her men to surrender. Soon after, the rest of Parros's allies arrive in Toros and the Mongauli army is forced to yield. Meanwhile, Guin is captured by Shidoh and learns that the young ward is seeking the ancient machine of Parros.
25	"Fated Battle"; Transliteration: "Shukumei to no Tatakai" (Japanese: 宿命との戦い)	September 20, 2009
With Mongaul defeated, Scaal heads to Nospherus to investigate the claims that a powerful weapon is hidden there. In Khum, Amnelis is faced with a difficult decision about her future, whether to be tried and executed or to surrender herself to the kingdom. After Shidoh lures Remus, Rinda, and Suni inside a chamber deep within a cave, Guin manages to intervene. Shidoh believes that Guin was responsible for causing Kinahn, the empire which governed Nospherus and Kitai in the past, to be destroyed. After Shidoh soon transforms into his true monstrous form, Guin later apprehends Shidoh's sword and stabs him in the chest. Guin, Rinda, Remus, and Suni run outside when a ball of light shoots out of the ground into the sky. The chamber collapses, trapping Shidoh inside, left there to die.
26	"Journey's Start"; Transliteration: "Tabidachi" (Japanese: 旅立ち)	September 27, 2009
Rinda and Remus have finally returned to Parros and preparations for Remus's coronation ceremony are well underway. However, on the day itself, Rinda has a terrifying vision about her brother's dark future. Amnelis wishes to live on deciding that with her own heart and mind, including her desire to defeat Norisse in battle. Meanwhile, when Guin is making his way north in search of answers about his past, he encounters his old friend Istavan along the way. Istavan wishes Guin to lend his power to become king, yet the leopard man refuses. Guin easily defeats Istavan in battle, and the duo part not as friends but as fated enemies.

== Volume DVDs ==
The episodes were released as a nine DVD limited edition set from between July 22, 2009 and March 24, 2010.

=== Japanese releases ===
(Japan, Region 2 DVD)
Volume	Episodes	Release date	Ref.
Volume 1	1–2	July 22, 2009	
Volume 2	3–5	August 26, 2009	
Volume 3	6–8	September 30, 2009	
Volume 4	9–11	October 28, 2009	
Volume 5	12–14	November 25, 2009	
Volume 6	15–17	December 23, 2009	
Volume 7	18–20	January 27, 2010	
Volume 8	21–23	February 24, 2010	
Volume 9	24–26	March 24, 2010	

=== North American release ===
Sentai Filmworks released the English subtitled version of the series in two hybrid DVD compilations which contain thirteen episodes each.

(North America, Region 1 DVD)
Volume	Episodes	Release date	Ref.
Volume 1	1–13	March 29, 2011	
Volume 2	14–26	May 31, 2011	
