= The Warriors (Yurick novel) =

1965 book by Sol Yurick

- First edition cover (Holt, Rinehart & Winston, 1965)
- Author: Sol Yurick
- Language: English
- Genre: Crime novel
- Publisher: E.P. Dutton
- Publication date: 1965 (Original hardcover); 2003 (Paperback Reprint)
- Publication place: United States
- Media type: Print (Paperback)
- Pages: 181 pp (Paperback Reprint)
- ISBN: 0-8021-3992-2 (Paperback Reprint)
- OCLC: 51607498
- Dewey Decimal: 813/.54 21
- LC Class: PS3575.U7 W375 2003

The Warriors is a 1965 novel written by Sol Yurick inspired by Xenophon's Anabasis. It was adapted into the film of the same name in 1979. Compared to the film, the novel takes a closer look at sexuality, reputation, family, and survival.

== Plot summary ==
It is the evening of July 4. Ismael Rivera, leader of the Delancey Thrones, the largest gang in New York City, calls a grand assembly of street gangs to the Bronx. Gangs from all over the city, signaled by a Beatles song on the radio, head to the meeting place at Van Cortlandt Park in the Bronx. As per instructions, none of them carries weapons, except for a handgun – a peace offering to Ismael.

Among the gangs are the Coney Island Dominators, an African American/Hispanic gang who are the central characters of the novel. The Dominators are Papa Arnold, the leader, Hector, the second-in-command, Lunkface, the strongest and most dangerous member, Bimbo the advisor, Hinton, the gang's artist and central character of the novel who is the second youngest, Dewey, the most level-headed member of the gang, and The Junior, the youngest of the group as well as the gang's mascot.

At the meeting, Ismael announces his plan, with other Thrones relaying the message to the ones in back who cannot hear. He proposes a grand truce designed to challenge "The Man" (society, otherwise called "The Others"). After a stirring speech, the assembly dissolves into chaos as several dissident gangs begin fighting. When the police arrive, having been tipped off about a big "rumble", many gangs, believing Ismael has set them up, turn their peace-offering handgun on Ismael, killing him.

When Arnold disappears amidst the rage of Ismael's gang members, it is up to Hector, the new leader of the Coney Island Dominators, to lead the remaining delegates from the Bronx back to Coney Island, passing through enemy-ridden gang turfs. When Hinton suggests removing their gang insignia – Mercedes symbols stolen off cars and converted into stick-pins in shop class at school which the gang wears on their hats – he is severely chastised. As Hinton is more familiar with the neighborhood, having lived there before, he is given the task of leading the gang out of Woodlawn Cemetery, where they have escaped the cops in the chaos.

The gang decides to call Wallie, the youth board worker assigned to their case, to come and drive them home. While waiting for him to arrive, the gang gets restless and jumps the subway. After a while, the train is stopped due to track work and the gang must take a different route.

En route to the other subway station, the gang encounters the Borinquen Blazers, a Puerto Rican gang. Hector meets the leader to parley (negotiate) for safe passage and all goes well until a girl, one of the Blazers' debs (girlfriends), desires one of the Dominators' insignia pins. When they refuse, the girl chastises the Blazers' leader, challenging his manhood. The leader then demands that the Dominators remove their pins in exchange for safe passage. Things escalate into an argument with the Dominators heading off to their destination and the Blazers not retaliating because their reinforcements have not arrived. Angry, Hector riles up the gang into a violent mood, deciding to spite the Blazers by going through their turf as a "war party" – an act performed by a gang ritual of changing the positions of the cigarettes in their hat brims.

The Dominators realize they are being tailed by the deb and a scout from the Blazers. They ambush them, taking away the scout's switchblade, then chasing him off. Lunkface convinces the girl to stick around on the promise of a pin and a rank (of "sister") in the gang. The Dominators then encounter an individual and start a fight, the girl cheering them on while they take turns stabbing the man with the stolen blade. The Dominators turn on the girl and gang-rape her, abandoning her in the street as they rush off to the subway.

Throughout the novel, the gang plays games of "manhood", either to relieve boredom or to settle disputes: waiting for the train, the Dominators have a contest as to who can urinate the farthest. Later, on the train, Hector passes out pieces of candy bars he has brought to the gang. When they start teasing Lunkface with a piece that has fallen on the floor, he becomes so angry he quits the gang on the spot. Hector eases the situation by selecting a member for punishment – Hinton – and Lunkface "insults" him by puffing on Hinton's "war cigarette". Then Hector holds another "manhood" game involving the gang sticking their heads out the train window until it passes into the subway tunnel. Hinton wins, nearly killing himself in the process.

Arriving at the 96th Street and Broadway station, the Dominators encounter a transit cop eyeing them suspiciously. Aware that the police are trying to round up all the gangs in the city, and that they are still holding the knife they used to stab the (possibly) dead man, the Dominators evade the transit cop by jumping off the train just as he boards, but more police show up and they flee: Hinton jumps onto the tracks and runs into the subway tunnel, Dewey and Junior jump a train that is going uptown, and Hector, Lunkface, and Bimbo run out of the station into Riverside Park. Now, without the other gang members to see them, the trio removes their insignia pins to avoid attracting attention. They encounter a large, heavy-set, alcoholic nurse sitting on a bench; Lunkface takes an interest in her. The woman is only interested in Hector, referring to Lunkface and Bimbo as "niggers". Hector lures her to a secluded spot where they try to have sex with her and she accepts them willingly. When Bimbo starts rifling through her purse, she reacts angrily. When Lunkface, frustrated, hits her to keep her still, the woman retaliates with unexpected strength and starts screaming "Rape!". The trio, unable to overpower her, flee but are promptly caught by police coming to the woman's aid.

Hinton, inside the subway tunnel, takes time for reflection. Feeling like an outsider and resenting the gang, he unleashes his contempt by writing on the wall, putting the gang down. Feeling guilty, he rubs out his insults and replaces them with the gang's "tag" (he has been doing this throughout the novel).

Hinton arrives at Times Square station, the designated meeting place. While waiting for the gang he enters a public bathroom (unknown to him) re-purposed as a sort of brothel and is forced into sex with a teenage prostitute, shakes off a homosexual, and a young junkie offering sexual favors for money, travels back and forth on the shuttle to Grand Central and, overcome with an inexplicable hunger, eats incessantly. When he comes to an arcade, he plays a shootout game with a dummy sheriff, losing thrice, then winning thrice, reflecting his resentment of authority. Before he knows it, he has achieved everything he usually does with the gang, and wonders why he needs them.

Dewey and Junior meet up with Hinton and the trio head off to complete their journey home. Although Dewey outranks Hinton, Hinton takes over the role of leader as he has an unexpected knack for the job. A pair of jocks, returning home from their senior prom with their dates, eye the trio as if challenging them, but Hinton doesn't back down, feeling a sense of moral victory as he does, and the jocks depart.

Hinton, Dewey, and Junior finally arrive in Coney Island just before daybreak. After a brief moment of celebration, Hinton, all riled up with anger and the sense of victory, impulsively calls out a rumble against the Lords, the rival gang to the Dominators. Rushing to the Lords' regular hangout, Hinton calls them out. They don't respond and Hinton celebrates this victory by drawing a huge mural on the hangout wall, insulting the Lords and celebrating the Dominators.

The trio then venture back to the local candy store where the Dominators' debs have been waiting. Learning from the girls that Papa Arnold had made it back hours earlier, Hinton regretfully tells the girlfriends of Hector, Lunkface, and Bimbo that they didn't make it back and Dewey and Junior walk off with their girlfriends.

Hinton, not having a girlfriend, goes home. There his mother, Minnie, is in the midst of sex with her boyfriend, Norbert. Hinton tends to the baby who was being neglected, then has a futile talk with his junkie older half-brother Alonso about life in general and the future. Hinton then crawls out onto the fire escape and falls asleep.

== Characters ==
- Ismael Rivera – The leader of the Delancey Thrones. He calls the meeting of all of the New York City gangs to share his plan to combine forces and overpower The Others.
- Hinton – The protagonist of the novel. He is a member of the Coney Island Dominators and the artist of the group. He develops a reputation for wild outbursts to hide his reluctance to fight.
- Hector – He is a member of the Coney Island Dominators and is voted Father after the group gets separated from Papa Arnold.
- Papa Arnold – He the leader of the Coney Island Dominators who gets separated from the group early in the night.
- Lunkface – He is a member of the Coney Island Dominators who wants to become the Father. He is big and prone to violent outbursts.
- Dewey – He is a member of the Coney Island Dominators who outranks Hinton.
- Junior – He is the youngest member of the Coney Island Dominators who is often shown reading a comic book about Greek adventurers. This comic book is meant mirror the story of Xenophon's Anabasis.
- Bimbo – He is a member of the Coney Island Dominators.

== Gangs ==
- Coney Island Dominators – From Coney Island, Brooklyn, the gang's members are black and Latino. They are noted as wearing blue paisley polo shirts, monkey jackets, tight black chino pants, ankle boots and high-crowned narrow-brimmed straw hats with Mercedes-Benz hood emblems attached.
- Delancey Thrones – From the Bowery, Manhattan, a Latino gang that wears red T-shirts, white pants and caps.
- Colonial Lords – Another gang from Coney Island and a rival to the Dominators.
- Morningside Sporting Seraphs – From Morningside Heights, Manhattan. They are noted as wearing big, bulky hats leaned to the side.
- Borinquen Blazers – From the Bronx, a Puerto Rican gang noted as wearing bright, striped shirts, pegged slacks, high cloth-front shoes with pearl buttons and wide brimmed straw "plantation owner" hats worn low.
- Castro Stompers, Golden Janissaries, Jackson Street Masai, Intervale Avenue Lesbos – Four gangs from the Bronx who were briefly mentioned.
- Spahis – Briefly mentioned gang with un-described territory.
- Unnamed Irish gang – Sporting crew cuts, long sideburns and sweaters.
- Unnamed African-American gang – Sporting pompadours, black headbands, black dress shoes and raincoats.

== Other adaptations ==
The novel was adapted into a movie of the same name in 1979 by Walter Hill and David Shaber, starring Michael Beck and Deborah Van Valkenburgh.

In August 2023, it was reported that Lin-Manuel Miranda had begun work on a stage musical adaptation of the novel. In August 2024 it was reported that the project was in fact to produce a concept album with Eisa Davis. The album, Warriors, which was revealed to be adapted from the film rather than the novel, was released on October 18, 2024. In June 2026, it was reported that the musical, Warriors, now described as being based on both the novel and the movie, would be premiering at Broadway's Lunt-Fontanne Theatre in March 2027.
