= Sol Yurick =

American writer (1925–2013)

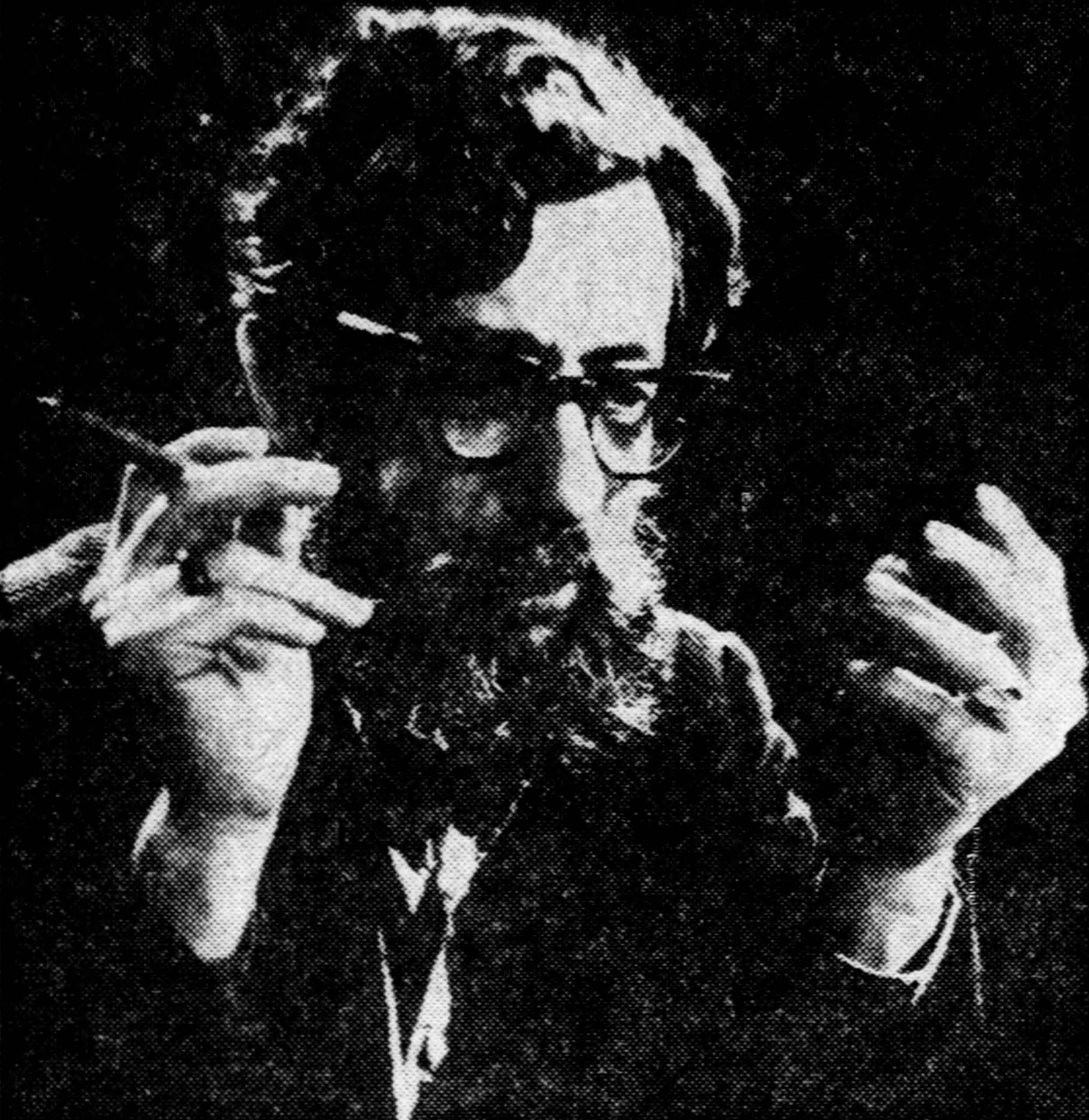
- Yurick c. 1966
- Born: Solomon Yurick; January 18, 1925; Manhattan, New York, U.S.
- Died: January 5, 2013 (aged 87); Brooklyn, New York, U.S.
- Education: New York University
- Occupation: Writer
- Spouse: Adrienne Lash (m. 1958)

Solomon Yurick (January 18, 1925 – January 5, 2013) was an American novelist. He was known for his book The Warriors, which became a major motion picture.

== Personal life and career ==
Yurick was born on January 18, 1925 to a Russian Jewish immigrant father Sam, a miller, and mother Flo, a Lithuanian Jewish immigrant. Theirs was a Jewish working class family and politically active, both for communism and in the labor movement as trade union activists. Family life in his early years meant that "Marx and Lenin, strikes and demonstrations, were regular topics of dinner table conversation", according to Eric Homberger of The Guardian, and that "his earliest political memory was, at the age of 14, the anguish he felt at the Stalin-Hitler pact;" the Pact was an agreement between Stalin and Hitler made in the last few weeks before the outbreak of war, leading Yurick to both fall out with his father, and to enlist in 1944 during World War II – where he trained as an Army surgical technician. Yurick said, "My feelings as a Jew were more important than my feelings as a communist."

After the war, he took a bachelor's degree at New York University, majoring in literature. He graduated and took a job with New York City's welfare department as a social investigator, a job he held until the early 1960s. It was here that he became familiar with children of welfare families, many of whom were "then called juvenile delinquents [...] Many of them belonged to fighting gangs...numbered in the hundreds; they were veritable armies." He earned his master's in English from Brooklyn College soon after, and then took up writing full time.

Yurick was involved in Students for a Democratic Society and the antiwar movement at this time. In 1968, he signed the "Writers and Editors War Tax Protest" pledge, vowing to refuse tax payments in protest against the Vietnam War.

In 1972, Yurick was awarded a Guggenheim Fellowship.

== Works ==
Yurick's first novel, The Warriors, appeared in 1965. It combined a classical Greek story, Anabasis, with a fictional account of gang wars in New York City. The novel was written by Yurick in response of what he perceived as a "romanticization" of street gangs following with the release of West Side Story. It inspired the 1979 film of the same name.

His other works include: Fertig (1966) (later adapted as The Confession), The Bag (1968), Someone Just Like You (1972), An Island Death (1976), Richard A (1981) and Behold Metatron, the Recording Angel (1985).

=== "The King of Malaputa" ===
In 1984, Yurick published a quite prescient and imaginative short story that considered how the use of a virtual, entirely imaginary island nation combined with advanced computer networking might be used to suck tremendous wealth from, and wreak havoc on, the global banking system. Appearing in Datamation, a then-leading trade magazine focused on enterprise computing, "The King of Malaputa" (translation: bad whore) predates by at least 15 years Neal Stephenson's better-known novel, Cryptonomicon (1999) and its imaginary island nation, Kinakuta, which has been set up for use in anonymous, computer-based banking activities. Yurick's island "exists" only as bogus entries in various banking and geographic databases; when searched for in these databases, the island appears to exist in many dimensions, including map coordinates and convincing satellite photos, but it is entirely virtual – a figment of digital imagination. Elsewhere, criminals use satellite dishes to hack into the global banking system and divert money to the imaginary island and then, into their own pockets. The story reflects Yurick's longstanding focus on banks and bankers as the source and agents of much power and trouble in the highly capitalized modern world.

== Death ==
Yurick died of complications from lung cancer on January 5, 2013. His death occurred 13 days before his 88th birthday.

== Bibliography (novels) ==
- The Warriors (1965) [republished 1979, 2003, 2013]
- Fertig (1966) [republished 2013]
- The Bag (1968)
- Someone Just Like You (1972)
- An Island Death (1976)
- Richard A. (1981)
- Behold Metatron, the Recording Angel (1985)
