= Eisa Davis =

American playwright (born 1971)

- Davis in 2026
- Born: May 5, 1971 (age 55)
- Education: Harvard University (AB); The New School for Social Research (MFA)
- Occupations: Playwright, actress, singer-songwriter
- Relatives: Angela Davis (aunt)

Eisa Davis (born May 5, 1971) is an American playwright, actress and singer-songwriter. She is known for her work as the co-creator of the Warriors concept album with Lin-Manuel Miranda. The subsequent musical is set to premiere on Broadway in March 2027 at the Lunt-Fontanne Theatre. Her previous works include the plays Bulrusher and Angela's Mixtape. For her stage acting in New York, she won an Obie Award for Sustained Excellence in Performance. She resides in Brooklyn.

== Early life and education ==
Davis was born and spent her childhood in Berkeley, California. As a child, she attended dance classes and studied voice and classical piano at the Young Musicians Program at UC Berkeley. She is the niece of political activist Angela Davis. Davis' autobiographical play Angela's Mixtape tells the story of her upbringing in the Bay Area and the impact of her family's politics on her childhood. After graduating from Berkeley High School, she earned a bachelor's degree from Harvard University. Davis earned her Master of Fine Arts from the Actors Studio at the New School for Social Research, where she double majored in playwriting and acting. Her dance skills are notable as well, with the dean of her program saying she could have been admitted to Alvin Ailey.

== Career ==
Davis began working as a professional actress at the age of 10 with appearances on a local television show, then acted in plays, industrials and films throughout high school and college. Davis moved to Los Angeles after college and worked with Anna Deavere Smith on her piece about that city's uprising, Twilight, LA, 1992.

After graduate school, Davis continued to work as an actor in television and film, with roles in The Wire and Soul Food. She became a lifetime member of the Actors Studio, as well as a resident playwright at New Dramatists. Drawing from her work as a hip hop journalist for Rap Sheet and The Source, Davis advocated for the hybrid art form that brings together theatre and hip hop by writing essays and participating in the Hip-Hop Theater Festival. She also became a poetry fellow at Cave Canem, the esteemed organization for black poets.

In 2006, Davis' play Bulrusher premiered at Urban Stages and was a finalist for the Pulitzer Prize. In 2007, Davis won an Obie Award with the ensemble of Passing Strange. The show premiered at Berkeley Rep, but then moved on to Broadway and Davis went with the show, only later to have the whole production filmed by Spike Lee. In 2009, she wrote and starred in Angela's Mixtape. The show was autobiographical and went on to make it into The New Yorker's list of best plays from that year.

Davis starred as Addie Pickett, nurse and receptionist at Bluebell, Alabama's local medical practice in The CW's series Hart of Dixie, a fish-out-of-water story about a New York City doctor (Rachel Bilson) adjusting to life in a small Southern town after she inherits a local medical practice.

In 2012 and 2013 Davis was Symphony Space's artist-in-residence. She taught at Williams College as an Arthur Levitt Fellow for the 2013-14 season. While continuing to write and act in plays, Davis also acted roles in House of Cards, Mare of Easttown, and Kindred. She also wrote for television for Spike Lee's Netflix series She's Gotta Have It, as well as on Justified: City Primeval.

In the summer of 2015, she starred in Dave Malloy's musical Preludes at Lincoln Center. In the summer of 2017, she starred in Julius Caesar at the Delacorte Theater.

Davis has two albums of her own music, Something Else and Tinctures. Some of her songs have been featured on the Showtime series Soul Food. Davis also narrated the role of Celestial Davenport Hamilton in the audiobook version of An American Marriage by Tayari Jones. Mushroom, a bilingual play Davis wrote about mushroom pickers around Kennett Square, PA earned several Barrymore nominations after its premiere in 2022. Her play Bulrusher was produced at Berkeley Repertory Theatre from October 27 until – December 3, 2023.

In 2024, Bulrusher was adapted into an opera by West Edge Opera in Berkeley, California. The production was part of the company's summer festival.

In 2026, Davis's play ||:Girls:||:Chance:||:Music:|| was performed by the two theaters that commissioned it, American Conservatory Theater and Vineyard Theater.

=== Artistic philosophy ===
Davis believes in the Ghanaian principle of Sankofa. The literal translation of the word is "return and collect it" or "go back and get it". This refers to her use of digging through her own lineage and history to find action and themes that can be used in her plays. She also uses her art to answer questions that "haunt" her or ideas that she is grappling with herself. Much of her artistic philosophy can be summed up in her quote: "Theatre is one of the few public spaces we have for active contemplation." She explores ideas such as blackness and family through the poetry of her language.

== Filmography ==
=== Film ===
Year	Title	Role	Notes
1997	Box Suite	Davis	
2001	Mourning Glory	Victim	
2003	Robot Stories	Helen	
2004	Brass Tacks	Tamara	
2005	Confess	Glyness Bennet	
2006	The Architect	Linda Freeman	
2008	Pretty Bird	Corporate Hotshot #3	
2010	Welcome to the Rileys	Vivian	
2011	In the Family	Anne Carter	
2012	The Letter	Therapist	
2013	The Volunteer	Karen	
2014	Jack Ryan: Shadow Recruit	FBI Explosives Expert	
2018	First Match	Bianca	
2019	After the Wedding	Tanya	
2021	Tick, Tick... Boom!	Aspiring Composer and Lyricist	
2023	Ex-Husbands	Eileen Link	
2024	Relay	Wash	
2026	Lucy Schulman	TBA	Post-production

=== Television ===
Year	Title	Role	Notes
1999	Now and Again	Reporter	Episode: "Over Easy"
2000–2009, 2024–2026	Law & Order	Various roles	6 episodes
2001–2003	Soul Food	Rose / Tinctures / Eisa Davis	4 episodes
2002–2008	The Wire	Bubbles' Sister	4 episodes
2003	Law & Order: Special Victims Unit	Vera Galeano	Episode: "Soulless"
2009	Great Performances	Mother	Episode: "Passing Strange"
2009	Damages	Carla Stenson	Episode: "London. Of Course"
2010	Mercy	Producer	Episode: "There Is No Room for You on My Ass"
2011–2012	Hart of Dixie	Addy Pickett	10 episodes
2012	Smash	Abigail	2 episodes
2014	The Blacklist	ND Agent	Episode: "The Good Samaritan (No. 106)"
2014	The Good Wife	Dr. Allison Sugar	Episode: "Dramatics, Your Honor"
2015	Gotham	Judith Barthel	Episode: "The Scarecrow"
2015	American Odyssey	Sheila Linderby	Episode: "Bug Out"
2015	Madam Secretary	Jane Smith	Episode: "The Long Shot"
2015–2016	House of Cards	Cynthia Driscoll	8 episodes
2016	The Family	Julia Beckett	Episode: "Of Puppies and Monsters"
2016	Blindspot	Alexandra	4 episodes
2016	Falling Water	Sarah Henry	Episode: "Circular Time"
2018	The Looming Tower	Condoleezza Rice	3 episodes
2018	Rise	Eva Thorne	5 episodes
2018	Succession	Joyce Miller	2 episodes
2018	God Friended Me	Lena	2 episodes
2019	Bluff City Law	General Virginia Howe	Episode: "Need to Know"
2020–2021	Betty	Jeanne	5 episodes
2021	Pose	Angie	Episode: "Intervention"
2021	Mare of Easttown	Gayle Graham	4 episodes
2023	Ahsoka	Captain Girard	Episode: "Part Five: Shadow Warrior"

== Awards and nominations ==
Year	Association	Category	Project	Result	Ref.
2007	Pulitzer Prize		Bulrusher	Finalist	
2008	Obie Awards	Best Ensemble Performance	Passing Strange	Won	
2009	Obie Award	Best Performance	Sustained Excellence	Won	
2011	Ruby Prize		Ramp	Won	
2012	Herb Alpert Theatre Award		N/A	Won	
2012	Barrymore Award		The History of Light	Nominated	
2013	Lucille Lortel Award		Luck of the Irish	Nominated	
N/A	Whitfield Cook Award		N/A	Won	
N/A	Helen Merrill Award		N/A	Won	
2016	Lucille Lortel Award		Preludes	Nominated	
2018	Drama League Award		Kings	Nominated	
2019	AUDELCO Award		The Secret Life Of Bees	Won	
2020	Creative Capital Award		N/A	Won	
2020	Lucille Lortel Award		The Secret Life of Bees	Nominated	
2023	Barrymore Award	Outstanding Original Production	Mushroom	Nominated	
2023	USA Artists Fellow		N/A	Won	
