= Cool World (disambiguation) =

Cool World is a 1992 animated film directed by Ralph Bakshi.

Cool World may also refer to:

== Film ==
- The Cool World, 1963 film directed by Shirley Clarke

== Music ==
- Cool World (Chat Pile album), 2024 album by Chat Pile
- Cool World (soundtrack), from the 1992 film
- The Cool World (soundtrack), a 1964 soundtrack album from the 1963 film, by Dizzy Gillespie
- "Cool World" (song), a 1981 song by Australian band Mondo Rock
- Cool World, a song by Karla DeVito from her 1981 album, Is This a Cool World or What?

== Video games ==
- Cool World (1992 video game), adapted from the film
- Cool World (NES video game), also adapted from the film
- Cool World (SNES video game), also adapted from the film
