= Rockstar Leeds =

British video game developer

Rockstar Leeds Limited

- Offices at 1 Victoria Place, Holbeck (pictured in 2026)
- Formerly: Möbius Entertainment Limited (1997–2004)
- Type: Subsidiary
- Industry: Video games
- Founded: December 1997; 28 years ago in Stanningley, Pudsey, England
- Founders: Ian J. Bowden; Dave Box; Gordon Hall; Jason McGann
- Headquarters: Holbeck, Leeds, England
- Key people: Alastair Dukes (studio director)
- Number of employees: ≈70 (2007)
- Parent: Rockstar Games (2004–present)

Rockstar Leeds Limited (formerly Möbius Entertainment Limited) is a British video game developer and a studio of Rockstar Games based in Leeds. Ian J. Bowden, Dave Box, Gordon Hall, and Jason McGann founded the company as Möbius Entertainment in December 1997 after working together at the studio Hookstone. Möbius worked with SCi on two games: Alfred's Adventure, a remake of Alfred Chicken, and the cancelled Titanium Angels. Starting in 2001, the studio created Game Boy Advance games for several publishers, including multiple for The 3DO Company and Max Payne for Rockstar Games.

By the time the PlayStation Portable was announced, Möbius had developed a game engine that targeted similar technical specifications. This attracted several parties interested in buying the studio, including Rockstar Games. The publisher's parent company, Take-Two Interactive, acquired Möbius in March 2004 and integrated it with Rockstar Games as Rockstar Leeds. Thereafter, the studio created several PlayStation Portable games, including the original games Grand Theft Auto: Liberty City Stories, Grand Theft Auto: Vice City Stories, Grand Theft Auto: Chinatown Wars, and Beaterator, as well as ports of Midnight Club 3: Dub Edition, The Warriors, and Manhunt 2.

== History ==
=== Background and early years (1990–2003) ===
A former Möbius Entertainment logo

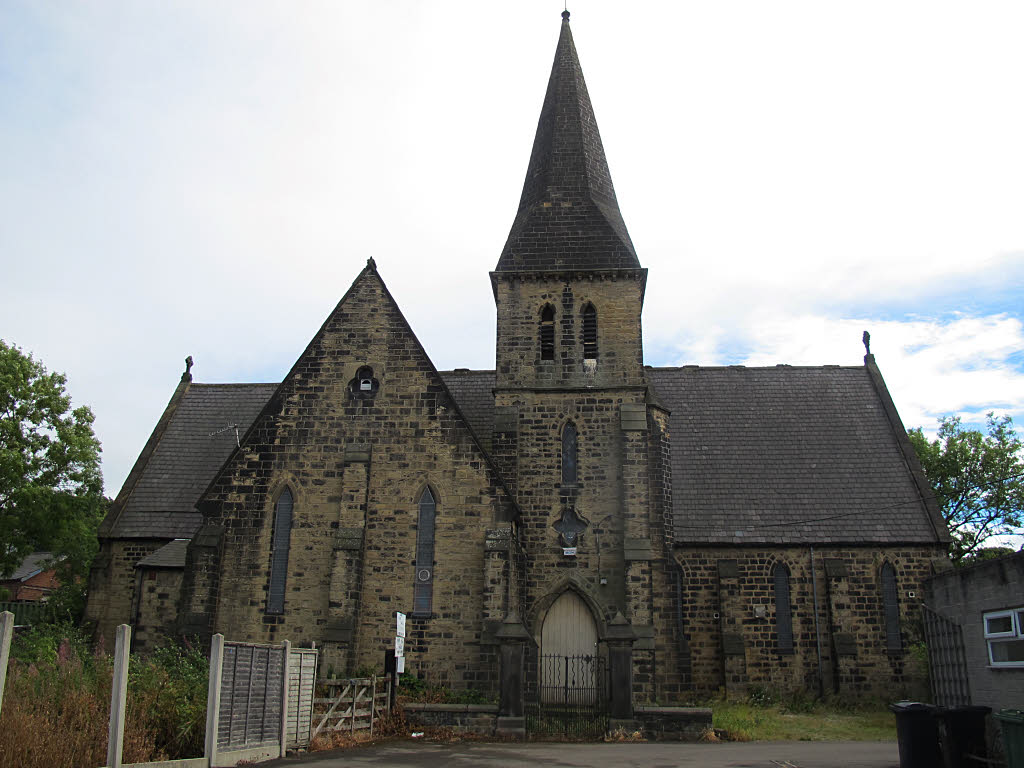
The former St Paul's Parish Church (pictured in 2016) housed Rockstar Leeds's offices until 2005.

Rockstar Leeds was founded as Möbius Entertainment by Ian J. Bowden, Dave Box, Gordon Hall, and Jason McGann. McGann had previously worked for the Harrogate-based studio Enigma Variations when, in 1989, the programmer Mark Mason was fired. This led four employees, including McGann and Peter Tattersall, to leave the company in early 1990. Alongside Mason, they set up Twilight, also based in Harrogate. Box was among the company's hires during its early expansion. Under Twilight, McGann conceived the game Alfred Chicken, originally based on Rainbow Islands and later influenced by Super Mario World. A demo was presented to Ocean Software, which had released some of Twilight's previous games, and the company was interested in publishing Alfred Chicken if its titular protagonist was replaced by Woodstock from the Peanuts franchise. Backed by the development team, McGann refused this offer as he wished to keep the character he had created. The studio instead worked with agent John Cook on a deal with publisher Mindscape that allowed Twilight to retain the game's intellectual property. The game was released for the Game Boy in 1993.

McGann and Tattersall, the artist for Alfred Chicken, left Twilight shortly after finishing the game for the Super Nintendo Entertainment System in 1994 and founded Hookstone. What remained of Twilight agreed to transfer the game's rights to the new company. Early on, Hookstone hired Hall (who had known McGann since 1990) as a programmer and Bowden as a junior artist. Hall described himself as "a programmer with an eye on the business side" and quickly noticed that the company "didn't have long left to live". Bowden, Box, Hall, and McGann consequently established Möbius in December 1997. The company moved into the converted building of the former St Paul's Parish Church (built in 1853) in the Stanningley district of Pudsey, a town close to Leeds. Möbius was without salary for about sixteen months until it signed its first publishing contract. During this time, the founders found that they worked best as a small team and regarded handheld games as the best fit for such a team size. Its first project was a remake of Alfred Chicken for the Game Boy Color, titled Alfred's Adventure. The game was released by SCi in Europe in June 2000. After its release, Möbius switched agents from Cook to Emma Killilea, who pitched Alfred Chicken to Sony. At the time, that company was looking for family-friendly games for its PlayStation console, which was nearing the end of its lifecycle, and greenlit an Alfred Chicken remake for the platform. That game was released in 2002.

For SCi, Möbius also developed Titanium Angels. The studio had been working on a game engine, Revelation, for several years and commenced the game's production when the publisher signed it onto the project in 1999. SCi announced Titanium Angels in January 2000 and, in September of that year, projected it to be released for the PlayStation 2 in late 2001. When Möbius was questioned on the game's status in October 2003, it said that the game had been cancelled "some time ago". With the publisher The 3DO Company, Möbius developed the Game Boy Advance conversions of High Heat Major League Baseball 2002 and High Heat Major League Baseball 2003, as well as the game Army Men: Turf Wars. Other early Game Boy Advance projects by Möbius include Bionicle, Drome Racers, and A Sound of Thunder, a tie-in for the film of the same name. The latter was announced at E3 2002 and scheduled to be released later that year, before the film. The game was finished in 2002 but remained unreleased for some time as the publisher, BAM! Entertainment, was waiting for the completion of the game's console versions. Finally, Möbius developed the Game Boy Advance adaptation of Max Payne for Rockstar Games.

=== Acquisition and PlayStation Portable projects (2002–2009) ===
Around 2002, Möbius created an internal team to develop a game engine for a prospective high-performance handheld console, such as what would be a "GameCube in your hand" by Nintendo. The studio had annual turnovers of £1 million by 2003. It joined the Game Republic studio network in the same year and, in December, acquired and absorbed the Yorkshire-based handheld game developer Spellbound to bring its headcount up to 30. Spellbound, also a member of Game Republic, had previously developed the Game Boy Advance versions of Colin McRae Rally 2.0, TOCA World Touring Cars and Starsky & Hutch.

When Sony announced the PlayStation Portable, it had technical specifications similar to those envisioned by Möbius for its game engine. The studio could quickly ready its technology for the device, which attracted three publishers that sought to acquire the studio and two that offered partnerships in which Möbius would have stayed independent. One of the publishers wanted the studio to create eight PlayStation Portable games annually, which Hall believed meant "less love from the publisher and a bloody hard slog to get those games done". Möbius chose to join Rockstar Games as it was the only one that did not intend for the studio of 37 people to quickly expand. Take-Two Interactive, the parent company of Rockstar Games, acquired Möbius in March 2004 for US$4.549 million in cash. The deal was announced on 8 April 2004 and the studio was integrated with Rockstar Games as Rockstar Leeds. Take-Two intended for the studio to develop PlayStation Portable games and further Game Boy Advance titles. Necroscope, a PlayStation 2 and Xbox game based on Brian Lumley's eponymous horror novel series, was cancelled in the process.

Under its new ownership, Rockstar Leeds was offered to develop games in the Grand Theft Auto series, which was a surprise to the studio as all prior games had been handled by Rockstar North. The studio accepted and, in January 2005, was announced as working on two PlayStation Portable games: a port of Midnight Club 3: Dub Edition and an original Grand Theft Auto title based on Liberty City, the setting of 2001's Grand Theft Auto III. The former was developed under the oversight of the original game's developer, Rockstar San Diego, and released in June 2005. The studio cooperated with Rockstar North on the latter, which was announced as Grand Theft Auto: Liberty City Stories in May 2005. It was released in October of that year to positive reviews. A successor, Grand Theft Auto: Vice City Stories, was released in October 2006. By November 2005, Rockstar Leeds had relocated from Pudsey to the City West business park in Leeds.

In the same year, a Game Boy Advance version of The Warriors was cancelled despite being finished. According to one former employee, Nintendo was wary of adult-oriented games, so the team chose to bring the game to the PlayStation Portable instead. That port was released in 2007. In the same year, the studio brought Manhunt 2 to the PlayStation Portable and Rockstar Games Presents Table Tennis to the Wii. Grand Theft Auto: Chinatown Wars, the first Grand Theft Auto game for the Nintendo DS, was released in March 2009 to critical acclaim. It is the highest-rated Nintendo DS game on Metacritic. Rockstar Leeds won "Best Handheld Games Studio" and was a finalist for "Best In-House Team" at the 2009 Develop Industry Excellence Awards. However, the game only sold 88,000 copies in its first month, out of an expected 200,000. Following Chinatown Wars, Rockstar Leeds briefly worked on a Bully adaptation for the Nintendo DS, which was quickly cancelled. The studio's Beaterator, a Timbaland-themed remake of a 2005 web game of the same name, was released in September 2009.

=== Development collaborations and departures (2007–present) ===
McGann left Rockstar Leeds in 2007 to take a sabbatical after nineteen years in the video game industry. By August of that year, the company had grown to 70 people. At this time, Hall stated the studio's intent to create original intellectual properties for next-generation platforms and step away from handheld development. Rockstar Leeds subsequently assisted Rockstar San Diego in the development of Red Dead Redemption. Hall and several Rockstar Leeds staff members spent one year in the United States to work on the game on-site. In November 2011, the studio ported L.A. Noire to Windows.

Lee Hutchinson and Matt Shepcar announced in February 2010 that they had left Rockstar Leeds to establish Double Eleven. The senior designer Simon Iwaniszak resigned from Rockstar Leeds to briefly join Double Eleven before opening Red Kite Games in early 2012. Hall took a sabbatical in 2011 to research "player psychology and microtransactions strategy" and joined Activision's mobile-focused The Blast Furnace studio as chief creative officer in August 2012. After exiting the video game industry in 2015, he pursued various hobbies until he died in March 2021 aged 51. Bowden left Rockstar Leeds in August 2014 to become the art director at the German social-network game developer GameDuell.

In July 2014, Rockstar Games contracted the property consultancy WSB to find 15,000 square feet (1,400 m^{2}) of office space in Leeds. By November 2016, Rockstar Leeds had moved to 1 Victoria Place in the city's Holbeck area. The studio co-developed 2013's Grand Theft Auto V and worked alongside all other Rockstar Games studios on Red Dead Redemption 2, which was released in October 2018. It further worked on Grand Theft Auto VI, released in November 2026.

== Games developed ==
=== As Möbius Entertainment ===
List of games developed by Rockstar Leeds, 2000–2004
Year	Title	Platform(s)	Publisher(s)	Notes
2000	Alfred's Adventure	Game Boy Color	SCi	
2001	High Heat Major League Baseball 2002	Game Boy Advance	The 3DO Company	
2002	High Heat Major League Baseball 2003	Game Boy Advance	The 3DO Company	
2002	Alfred Chicken	PlayStation	Sony Computer Entertainment	
2002	Army Men: Turf Wars	Game Boy Advance	The 3DO Company	
2003	Drome Racers	Game Boy Advance	THQ	
2003	Bionicle	Game Boy Advance	THQ	
2003	Barbie Horse Adventures: Blue Ribbon Race	Game Boy Advance	Vivendi Universal Games	Co-developed with Blitz Games
2003	Barbie Horse Adventures: Wild Horse Rescue	Game Boy Advance	Vivendi Universal Games	Co-developed with Blitz Games
2003	Pop Idol	Game Boy Advance	Codemasters	
2003	Max Payne	Game Boy Advance	Rockstar Games	
2004	A Sound of Thunder	Game Boy Advance	BAM! Entertainment	

=== As Rockstar Leeds ===
List of games developed by Rockstar Leeds, 2005–present
Year	Title	Platform(s)	Publisher(s)	Notes
2005	Midnight Club 3: Dub Edition	PlayStation Portable	Rockstar Games	Port development
2005	Grand Theft Auto: Liberty City Stories	Android, Fire OS, iOS, PlayStation 2, PlayStation Portable	Rockstar Games	Co-developed with Rockstar North
2006	Grand Theft Auto: Vice City Stories	PlayStation 2, PlayStation Portable	Rockstar Games	Co-developed with Rockstar North
2007	The Warriors	PlayStation Portable	Rockstar Games	Port development
2007	Rockstar Games Presents Table Tennis	Wii	Rockstar Games	Port development
2007	Manhunt 2	PlayStation Portable	Rockstar Games	Port development
2009	Grand Theft Auto: Chinatown Wars	Android, Fire OS, iOS, Nintendo DS, PlayStation Portable	Rockstar Games	Co-developed with Rockstar North
2009	Beaterator	iOS, PlayStation Portable	Rockstar Games	
2010	Red Dead Redemption	Nintendo Switch, PlayStation 3, PlayStation 4, Windows, Xbox 360	Rockstar Games	Supportive development for Rockstar San Diego
2011	L.A. Noire	Nintendo Switch, PlayStation 3, PlayStation 4, Windows, Xbox 360, Xbox One	Rockstar Games	Supportive development for Team Bondi; also ported to Windows
2012	Max Payne 3	macOS, PlayStation 3, Windows, Xbox 360	Rockstar Games	Developed as part of Rockstar Studios
2013	Grand Theft Auto V	PlayStation 3, PlayStation 4, PlayStation 5, Windows, Xbox 360, Xbox One, Xbox Series X/S	Rockstar Games	Supportive development for Rockstar North
2018	Red Dead Redemption 2	PlayStation 4, Stadia, Windows, Xbox One	Rockstar Games	
2026	Grand Theft Auto VI	PlayStation 5, Xbox Series X/S	Rockstar Games	

=== Cancelled ===
- Titanium Angels
- Necroscope
