= List of fictional crime bosses and gang leaders =

== In books ==
(Not mentioned in other sections)

- Spatz Antonelli – Artemis Fowl: The Eternity Code
- Papa Arnold – The Warriors
- Enrico Balazar – The Drawing of the Three
- Adán Barrera – The Power of the Dog
- Don Miguel Angel "Tío" Barrera – The Power of the Dog
- Raúl Barrera – The Power of the Dog
- Capa Vencarlo Barsavi – The Lies of Locke Lamora
- Frank Bellarosa – The Gold Coast
- Ernst Stavro Blofeld – James Bond
- Dante Corrales – Against All Enemies
- Julian DiGeorge – The Executioner
- Gentleman John Marcone – The Dresden Files
- Professor Moriarty – Sherlock Holmes
- Jorge Rojas – Against All Enemies
- Ismael Rivera – The Warriors
- Chrysophrase the Troll – Discworld
- Ernesto "El Matador" Zuñiga – Against All Enemies
- Kaul Hiloshudon – Jade City

== In comics ==
- Black Tarantula – Marvel Comics
- Oswald Cobblepot / Penguin – DC Comics
- Harvey Dent / Two-Face – DC Comics
- Diavolo – JoJo's Bizarre Adventure
- Edmund Dorrance / King Snake – DC Comics
- Morgan Edge – DC Comics
- Carmine Falcone – DC Comics
- Wilson Fisk / Kingpin – Marvel Comics
- Don Fortunato – Marvel Comics
- John Genovese – Kick-Ass
- Giorno Giovanna – JoJo's Bizarre Adventure
- Hammerhead – Marvel Comics
- Akira Hojo – Sanctuary
- Jiji – Ichi the Killer
- The Joker – DC Comics
- Kakihara – Ichi the Killer
- Lonnie Lincoln / Tombstone – Marvel Comics
- Lex Luthor – DC Comics
- Giacomo Magliozzi – Sin City
- Silvio Manfredi / Silvermane – Marvel Comics
- Bruno Mannheim – DC Comics
- Sal Maroni – DC Comics
- Roberto Rastapopoulos – The Adventures of Tintin
- John Rooney – Road to Perdition
- Rose – Marvel Comics
- Stoneface – Marvel Comics
- Billy Russo / Jigsaw – Marvel Comics
- Tsunayoshi "Tsuna" Sawada – Katekyo Hitman REBORN!
- Roman Sionis / Black Mask – DC Comics
- Cornell Stokes / Cottonmouth – Marvel Comics
- Rupert Thorne – DC Comics
- Viper – Marvel Comics
- Herr Wallenquist – Sin City
- Arnold Wesker / Ventriloquist – DC Comics
- Tobias Whale – DC Comics
- Warren White / Great White Shark – DC Comics
- Tony Zucco – DC Comics
- Marshall D. Teach – One Piece
- Donquixote Doflamingo – One Piece
- Big Boy - Dick Tracy

== In film ==
- Siddharth Abhimanyu (Arvind Swamy) – Thani Oruvan
- Fausto Alarcón (Julio Cesar Cedillo) – Sicario
- Don Altobello (Eli Wallach) – The Godfather Part III
- Mark Antony (Raghuvaran) – Basha
- Isabel "La Bruja" Aretas (Kate del Castillo) – Bad Boys for Life
- Carlos Ayala (Steven Bauer) – Traffic
- Bangun (Tio Pakusadewo) – The Raid 2
- Bejo (Alex Abbad) – The Raid 2
- Mr. Big (John Vernon) – I'm Gonna Git You Sucka
- Mr. Big (Yaphet Kotto) – Live and Let Die
- Mr. Big (Maurice LaMarche) – Zootopia
- The Big City Agent – The Trumpet of the Swan
- Big Meat (The Game) – Waist Deep
- Manick Baasha (Rajinikanth) – Basha
- Damian Baine (Wyclef Jean) – Dirty
- Caesar Enrico Bandello (Edward G. Robinson) – Little Caesar
- Armando Barillo (Willem Dafoe) – Once Upon a Time in Mexico
- Charlie Barret (Christopher Walken) – Suicide Kings
- Eddie Bartlett (James Cagney) – The Roaring Twenties
- Emilio Barzini (Richard Conte) – The Godfather
- Teddy Bass (Ian McShane) – Sexy Beast
- Beans (Beanie Sigel) – State Property 2
- Mickey Bergman (Danny DeVito) – Heist
- Big Baby Sweets (Violent J) – Big Money Hustlas
- Biggs (Kymani Marley) – Shottas
- David Billa (Rajinikanth) – Billa (1980)
- David Billa (Ajith Kumar) – Billa (2007)
- Raymond Blossom (Timothy Hutton) – Playing God
- Drago Bludvist (Djimon Hounsou) – How to Train Your Dragon 2
- Clarence Boddicker (Kurtwood Smith) – RoboCop
- Maynard Boyle (John Vernon) – Charley Varrick
- Arturo Braga (John Ortiz) – Fast & Furious and Fast & Furious 6
- Rory Breaker (Vas Blackwood) – Lock, Stock and Two Smoking Barrels
- Mr. Bridger (Noël Coward) – The Italian Job
- Carlito Brigante (Al Pacino) – Carlito's Way
- Carlito Brigante (Jay Hernandez) – Carlito's Way: Rise to Power
- Mr. Bronson (Kris Kristofferson) – Payback
- John Brown (Raymond Massey) – Santa Fe Trail
- Nino Brown (Wesley Snipes) – New Jack City
- Teddy Bruckshot (Louie Rankin) – Shottas
- Bucho (Joaquim de Almeida) – Desperado
- Adam "Duke" Byron (Brian Donlevy) – Heaven Only Knows
- Joe Cabot (Lawrence Tierney) – Reservoir Dogs
- Enrique Cali (Jesse Doran) – Toy Soldiers
- Bugsy Calhoune (Michael Lerner) – Harlem Nights
- Antonio "Tony" Camonte (Paul Muni) – Scarface
- Al Capone (Robert De Niro) – The Untouchables
- Al Capone (Ben Gazzara) – Capone
- Alphonse "Big Boy" Caprice (Al Pacino) – Dick Tracy
- Carlos (Raul Julia) – Tequila Sunrise
- Ben Carter (John Carradine) – Frontier Marshal
- Mr. Carter (William Devane) – Payback
- Johnny Caspar (Jon Polito) – Miller's Crossing
- Pablo Chacon (Tomer Sisley) – We're the Millers
- Chang (John Lone) – War
- Lao Che (Roy Chiao) – Indiana Jones and the Temple of Doom
- Cleon (Dorsey Wright) – The Warriors
- Domenico Clericuzio (Danny Aiello) – The Last Don
- Vincenzzo Coccotti (Christopher Walken) – True Romance
- Mickey Cohen (Sean Penn) – Gangster Squad
- Mickey Cohen (Harvey Keitel) – Bugsy
- Lenny Cole (Tom Wilkinson) – RocknRolla
- Spats Colombo (George Raft) – Some Like It Hot
- Luis Comacho (Henry Silva) – Code of Silence
- Michael Corleone (Al Pacino) – The Godfather, The Godfather Part II, and The Godfather Part III
- Santino "Sonny" Corleone (James Caan) – The Godfather
- Vito Corleone (Marlon Brando and Robert De Niro) – The Godfather and The Godfather Part II
- Vincent Corleone (Andy Garcia) - The Godfather Part III
- Gabriel Cortez (Eduardo Noriega) – The Last Stand
- Vicente Cortez (Joaquín Cosío) – Hot Pursuit
- Anthony "Tony" Cortino (Jay Mohr) – Mafia!
- Vincenzo Armani Windbreaker Cortino (Lloyd Bridges) – Mafia!
- Frank Costello (Jack Nicholson) – The Departed
- Ramón Cota (Billy Drago) – Delta Force 2: The Colombian Connection
- Ralph Cotter (James Cagney) – Kiss Tomorrow Goodbye
- "Wizard" Cuevas (Jimmy Smits) – The Tax Collector
- Ottilio Cuneo (Rudy Bond) – The Godfather
- Richie Cusack (William Hurt) – A History of Violence
- Bill "The Butcher" Cutting (Daniel Day-Lewis) – Gangs of New York
- Cyrus (Roger Hill) – The Warriors
- Frank D'Amico (Mark Strong) – Kick-Ass
- Dame (Damon Dash) – State Property 2
- David (Kiefer Sutherland) – The Lost Boys
- Cross De Lena (Jason Gedrick) – The Last Don
- Abraham "Cousin Avi" Denovitz (Dennis Farina) – Snatch
- Bacon Diaz (Luis Guzmán) – Keanu
- King Diaz (Ian Casselberry) – Keanu
- Malik El Djebena (Tahar Rahim) – A Prophet
- Top Dollar (Michael Wincott) – The Crow
- Don (Amitabh Bachchan) – Don
- Don (Shahrukh Khan) – Don: The Chase Begins Again
- Batiste Duryea (Brian Donlevy) – This Is My Affair
- Jocko Dundee (Peter Boyle) – Johnny Dangerously
- Edge – The Warriors
- Ernesto Escobedo (Miguel Sandoval) – Clear and Present
- Lino Esparza (Ismael Cruz Córdova) – Miss Bala
- Servando "El Chino" Esparza (Tenoch Huerta) – Tigers Are Not Afraid
- Justin Fairfax (James Coburn) – Payback
- Faisal (Matt Schulze) – Out of Reach
- Carmine "The Roman" Falcone (Tom Wilkinson) – Batman Begins
- Don Falcone (Roy Scheider) – Romeo Is Bleeding
- Don Fanucci (Gastone Moschin) – The Godfather Part II
- Frankie Faulkner (Fred Clark) – Alias Nick Beal
- Signor Ferrari (Sydney Greenstreet) – Casablanca
- Gianni Franco (Jeroen Krabbé) – The Punisher
- Casanova Frankenstein (Geoffrey Rush) – Mystery Men
- Orian "The Wolfking"/"Niagara" Franklin (Jeff Goldblum) – Hotel Artemis
- Johnny Friendly (Lee J. Cobb) – On the Waterfront
- Tatsumi Fuwa (Hiroshi Vava) – Sign Gene
- Edward J. "Blackie" Gallagher (Clark Gable) – Manhattan Melodrama
- Anton Gallegos (Arthur Mendoza) – Deep Cover
- The Gangster (Paul Bettany and Malcolm McDowell) – Gangster No. 1
- Benito García (Adal Ramones) – Saving Private Perez
- Fernando "El Jefe" Garcia (Tony Perez) – Close Range
- Julio Gonzales (Jimmy Smits) – Running Scared
- Hideaki Goto (Kenichi Endo) – The Raid 2
- Moe Greene (Alex Rocco) – The Godfather
- Manny "Papi" Greco (Edward James Olmos) – 2 Guns
- Thomas "Juntao" Griffin (Tom Wilkinson) – Rush Hour
- Carl Grissom (Jack Palance) – Batman
- Bill Guerrard (Randy Quaid) – The Ice Harvest
- Brad Gurdlinger (Ed Helms) – We're the Millers
- Gustavo (Clifton Collins Jr.) – The Mule
- Lucas Gutierrez (Paco León) – The Unbearable Weight of Massive Talent
- Minty Gutierrez (Shawn Elliott) – Double Take
- George Hally (Humphrey Bogart) – The Roaring Twenties
- Tom "Preacher" Harris (Michael Parks) – Blood Father
- Hopper (Kevin Spacey) – A Bug's Life
- Marcus Hubbard (Fredric March) – Another Part of the Forest
- Don Huertero (Joaquim de Almeida) – The Death and Life of Bobby Z
- Jabba the Hutt (Larry Ward) – Star Wars
- "Ten Grand" Jackson (Steve Cochran) – Wonder Man
- Doc Johnson (Richard Ward) – Across 110th Street
- Bumpy Jonas (Moses Gunn) – Shaft
- Alexei Jovanovic (David Ogden Stiers) – Jungle 2 Jungle
- George Jung (Johnny Depp) – Blow
- Eddie Kagle (Paul Muni) – Angel on My Shoulder
- Teddy KGB (John Malkovich) – Rounders
- Shoaib Khan (Emraan Hashmi) – Once Upon a Time in Mumbaai
- Kokki Kumar (Dhanush) – Pudhupettai
- Kuroda – Into the Sun
- Ben Larkin (John Vernon) – Brannigan
- Latón (Andy Garcia) – The Mule
- Henry Lee (Ric Young) – The Corruptor
- Joe Lilac (Dana Andrews) – Ball of Fire
- Don Edward Lino (Robert De Niro) – Shark Tale
- Doyle Lonnegan (Robert Shaw) – The Sting
- "Hatchet" Harry Lonsdale (P. H. Moriarty) – Lock, Stock and Two Smoking Barrels
- Frank Lopez (Robert Loggia) – Scarface
- Patti LoPresti (Cathy Moriarty-Gentile) – Analyze That
- Frank Lucas (Denzel Washington) – American Gangster
- Licio Lucchesi (Enzo Robutti) – The Godfather Part III
- Memo "Diablo" Lucero (Geno Silva) – A Man Apart
- César Luciani (Niels Arestrup) – A Prophet
- Tony Luna (Mike Genovese) – Code of Silence
- Luther (David Patrick Kelly) – The Warriors
- Dr. Mabuse (Rudolf Klein-Rogge and Wolfgang Preiss) – Dr. Mabuse the Gambler and subsequent films
- Majestic (Adewale Akinnuoye-Agbaje) – Get Rich or Die Tryin'
- Angel Malvado (Danny Trejo) – Juarez 2045
- The Man with the Plan (Christopher Walken) – Things to Do in Denver When You're Dead
- Vincent Mancini-Corleone (Andy García) – The Godfather Part III
- Duke Mantee (Humphrey Bogart) – The Petrified Forest
- Dominic Manetta (Joseph Rigano) – Analyze This
- "Killer" Mannion (Edward G. Robinson) – The Whole Town's Talking
- Roman Maroni (Richard Dimitri) – Johnny Dangerously
- Sal Maroni (Eric Roberts) – The Dark Knight
- Hugo Martinez (Sergio Peris-Mencheta) – Rambo: Last Blood
- Victor Martinez (Óscar Jaenada) – Rambo: Last Blood
- Gino Marzzone (Richard C. Sarafian) – Bound
- Masai (Edward Sewer) – The Warriors
- Mauricio "Moco" (Peter Marquardt) – El Mariachi and Desperado
- Max (Edward Herrmann) – The Lost Boys
- Peter McAllister (Mitchell Ryan) – Lethal Weapon
- Whip McCord (Humphrey Bogart) – The Oklahoma Kid
- Boss McGinty (Roy Emerton) – The Triumph of Sherlock Holmes
- Frank Miller (Ian MacDonald) – High Noon
- Frank Milo (Bill Murray) – Mad Dog and Glory
- Sultan Mirza (Ajay Devgan) – Once Upon a Time in Mumbaai
- Moco (Peter Marquardt) – El Mariachi
- Momo (Ron Karabatsos) – Get Shorty
- Monarch (Jay Leno) – Igor
- Tony Montana (Al Pacino) – Scarface
- Arcángel de Jesús Montoya (Luis Tosar) – Miami Vice
- Morelle (Ralph Richardson) – Bulldog Jack
- John Murrell (Humphrey Bogart) – Virginia City
- Subhash Nagre (Amitabh Bachchan) – Sarkar
- Jack "The Joker" Napier (Jack Nicholson) – Batman
- Velu Nayagan (Kamal Haasan) – Nayakan
- Niko (Orestes Matacena) – The Mask
- Blackie Norton (Clark Gable) – San Francisco
- O-Ren Ishii (Lucy Liu) – Kill Bill
- Leo O'Bannon (Albert Finney) – Miller's Crossing
- Juan Obregón (Benjamin Bratt) – Traffic
- Uri Omovich (Karel Roden) – RocknRolla
- Joseph Palmi (Joe Pesci) – The Good Shepherd
- Paris (Avery Brooks) – The Big Hit
- Julián Pérez (Miguel Rodarte) – Saving Private Perez
- Mateo Perez (Danny Trejo) – The Good, the Bad, and the Dead
- Jonah Pincerna (Diego Luna) – Blood Father
- Juan Carlos "El Topo" Pintera (Benjamin Bratt) – Snitch
- Luke Plummer (Tom Tyler) – Stagecoach
- "Brick Top" Polford (Alan Ford) – Snatch
- Tom Powers (James Cagney) – The Public Enemy
- Sir Humphrey Pengallan (Charles Laughton) – Jamaica Inn
- James Lionel "Jimmy" Price (Kenneth Cranham) – Layer Cake
- Morgan Price (Robert Forster) – Confidence
- Vladimir Pushkin (Vladimir Kulich) – The Equalizer
- Dan Quigley (James Cagney) – Lady Killer
- Don José Reyes (Ernesto Gómez Cruz) – Hell
- Luis Rico (Hechter Ubarry) – Crocodile Dundee II
- Lou "The Wrench" Rigazzi (Frank Gio) – Analyze That
- Mendy Ripstein (Peter Falk) – Undisputed
- Jose Rivera (Mircea Drambareanu) – Contract to Kill
- Tama Riyadi (Ray Sahetapy) – The Raid
- Johnny Rocco (Edward G. Robinson) – Key Largo
- Romeo (Clifton Collins Jr.) – The Boondock Saints II: All Saints Day
- John Rooney (Paul Newman) – Road to Perdition
- Hyman Roth (Lee Strasberg) – The Godfather Part II
- Arjen Rudd (Joss Ackland) – Lethal Weapon 2
- Tony "The Tiger" Russo (Dean Stockwell) – Married to the Mob
- Howard Saint (John Travolta) – The Punisher
- Elena "La Reina" Sánchez (Salma Hayek) – Savages
- Franz Sanchez (Robert Davi) – Licence to Kill
- Don Luis Sandoval (Beto Benites) – Colombiana
- Nicky Santoro (Joe Pesci) – Casino
- Schränker (Gustaf Gründgens) – M
- El Scorpio (Henry Kingi) – Predator 2
- Semyon (Armin Mueller-Stahl) – Eastern Promises
- Jimmy Serrano (Dennis Farina) – Midnight Run
- Harold Shand (Bob Hoskins) – The Long Good Friday
- Shiro (Ryo Ishibashi) – War
- Bill Sykes (Robert Loggia) – Oliver & Company
- Sid – The Warriors
- Primo Sidone (Chazz Palminteri) – Analyze This
- Alejandro Sosa (Paul Shenar) – Scarface
- Keyser Söze – The Usual Suspects
- Primo Sparazza (Joseph Ruskin) – Smokin' Aces
- Spike (William Haade) – Down to Earth
- Starr (Kate Klugman) – The Warriors
- Austin Stoneman (Ralph Lewis) – The Birth of a Nation
- Anthony Stracci (Don Costello) – The Godfather
- Rocky Sullivan (James Cagney) – Angels with Dirty Faces
- Sully (Paul Greco) – The Warriors
- Jin Sun (Terry Chen) – Stark Raving Mad
- Surya (Rajinikanth) – Thalapathi
- Swan (Michael Beck) – The Warriors
- Victor Sweets (Chiwetel Ejiofor) – Four Brothers
- Joey Tai (John Lone) – Year of the Dragon
- Ricky Tan (John Lone) – Rush Hour 2
- Philip Tattaglia (Victor Rendina) – The Godfather
- Kinman Tau (Tzi Ma) – Rapid Fire
- Eddie Temple (Michael Gambon) – Layer Cake
- Felix Reyes-Torrena (Javier Bardem) – Collateral
- Rogelio Torrez (Steven Seagal) – Machete
- Don Massimo Torricelli (Michele Morrone) – 365 Days
- Jack Travis (Stuart Wilson) – Lethal Weapon 3
- Alec Trevelyan (Sean Bean) – GoldenEye
- Dorian Tyrell (Peter Greene) – The Mask
- Uncle Bart (Bob Hoskins) – Unleashed
- Uncle Benny (Kim Chan) – Lethal Weapon 4
- Uncle Nikolai (Levan Uchaneishvili) – 25th Hour
- Liberty Valance (Lee Marvin) – The Man Who Shot Liberty Valance
- Eddie Valentine (Paul Sorvino) – The Rocketeer
- Lino Valdez (Noé Hernández) – Miss Bala
- Vance (Konrad Sheehan) – The Warriors
- Ray Vargo (Henry Silva) – Ghost Dog: The Way of the Samurai
- Vijay Verma (Amitabh Bachchan) – Deewaar
- Juan Miguel "Pantera Negra" Villegas (Carlos Corona) – Gringo
- Paul Vitti (Robert De Niro) – Analyze This and Analyze That
- Marsellus Wallace (Ving Rhames) – Pulp Fiction
- Harry Waters (Ralph Fiennes) – In Bruges
- Brad Wesley (Ben Gazzara) – Road House
- Frank White (Christopher Walken) – King of New York
- Smiley Williams (Hardie Albright) – Angel on My Shoulder
- Willie "King Willie" (Calvin Lockhart) – Predator 2
- Johnny Wong (Anthony Wong) – Hard Boiled
- Giuseppe "Papa Joe" Yakavetta (Carlo Rota) – The Boondock Saints
- Aniki Yamamoto (Takeshi Kitano) – Brother
- Boris "The Blade" Yurinov (Rade Šerbedžija) – Snatch
- Joe Zaluchi (Louis Guss) – The Godfather
- Paul Zapatti (Anthony Franciosa) – City Hall
- Joey Zasa (Joe Mantegna) – The Godfather Part III
- Lord Shen (Gary Oldman) – Kung Fu Panda 2
- Big Jack Horner (John Mulaney) – Puss in Boots: The Last Wish
- Valentin Zukovsky (Robbie Coltrane) – GoldenEye and The World Is Not Enough

== In television ==
- Javier Acosta (Cliff Curtis) – Gang Related
- Simon Adebisi (Adewale Akinnuoye-Agbaje) – Oz
- Polat Alemdar (Necati Şaşmaz) – Valley of the Wolves
- Johnny Allen (Billy Murray) – EastEnders
- El Alma Del Diablo (David Zayas) – Deadly Class
- Hector "Escorpión" Álvarez (Emilio Rivera) – Z Nation
- Marcus Álvarez (Emilio Rivera) – Sons of Anarchy
- Jackie Aprile, Sr. (Michael Rispoli) – The Sopranos
- Colin Atkinson (Tristan Rogers) – The Young and the Restless
- Benjamín Avendaño (Carlos Hernán Romo) – El Chapo
- "El Lobito" Avendaño (Biassini Segura) – El Chapo
- Ramón Avendaño (Rolf Petersen) – El Chapo
- El Banquero (Guillermo García) – Mayans M.C.
- Avon Barksdale (Wood Harris) – The Wire
- Guillermo Bautista (Daniel Raymont) – The Mosquito Coast
- Rafael Bautista (Joaquín Cosío) – El Candidato
- Stringer Bell (Idris Elba) – The Wire
- Sacha Belov (Sergei Bezrukov) – Brigada
- Yésica "La Diabla" Beltrán (Majida Issa, Jordana Issa and Kimberly Reyes) – Sin senos sí hay paraíso and El final del paraíso
- Braulio Bermudez (Fernando Solórzano) – The Mafia Dolls
- Arturo Bernal Leyda (Antonio de la Vega) – El Chapo
- Mama Binturong (Rachel House) – The Lion Guard
- Fraser Black (Jesse Birdsall) – Hollyoaks
- Grace Black (Tamara Wall) – Hollyoaks
- Juan Vicente "Niño Malo" Blanco (Alfonso Herrera) – El Capo
- Pacífico Blanco (Daniel Lugo) – El Capo
- Jimmy Cacuzza (Jeff Wincott) – Sons of Anarchy
- Conrado "El Mocho" Cadena (Álvaro Rodríguez) – El Cartel
- Óscar Cadena (Fernando Solórzano) – El Cartel
- Pepe Cadena (Diego Cadavid) – El Cartel
- Cesar Calderon (A Martinez) – Castle
- Rocco Cammeniti (Robert Forza) – Neighbours
- Al Capone (Stephen Graham) – Boardwalk Empire
- Aurelio "El Señor de los Cielos" Casillas (Rafael Amaya) – El Señor de los Cielos
- Don Caló Castellamare (Gracindo Júnior) – Poder Paralelo
- Tony Castellamare (Gabriel Braga Nunes) – Poder Paralelo
- Fat Cat (Jim Cummings) – Chip 'n Dale Rescue Rangers
- Bai "Mr. Chang" Ji-Shin Chang (Toshiyuki Morikawa and Trevor Devall) – Black Lagoon
- Fyodor Chevchenko (Roy Scheider) – Third Watch
- Chico (Michel Duval) – Deadly Class
- Bill Church, Jr. (Bruce Campbell) – Lois & Clark: The New Adventures of Superman
- Bill Church, Sr. (Peter Boyle) – Lois & Clark: The New Adventures of Superman
- Beaver Cleaver & Wally Cleaver – Teenage Mutant Ninja Turtles (1987)
- Matias Cordeiro (Reynaldo Gianecchini) – Good Morning, Verônica
- Michael "Sonny" Corinthos Jr. (Maurice Benard) – General Hospital
- Freddie Cork (Kevin Chapman) – Brotherhood
- Carlos Cortez (Steven Bauer) – UC: Undercover
- Domenic Cosoleto (Louis Ferreira) – Bad Blood
- Eamonn Cunningham (Ciarán Hinds) – Kin
- Jack Dalton (Hywel Bennett) – EastEnders
- Anthony "Fat Tony" D'Amico (Joe Mantegna) – The Simpsons
- Ernest Darby (Mitch Pileggi) – Sons of Anarchy
- King Dedede (Ed Paul) – Kirby: Right Back at Ya!
- Don Victor DiGiorgio (Michael V. Gazzo) – Magnum, P.I.
- Stefano DiMera (Joseph Mascolo) – Days of Our Lives
- EJ DiMera (James Scott) – Days of Our Lives
- Andres Doza (Yul Vazquez) – SEAL Team
- Anthony "Tony" Dracon (Richard Grieco) – Gargoyles
- Morgan Edge (Rutger Hauer and Patrick Bergin) – Smallville
- Edson (Seu Jorge) – Irmandade
- Carl Elias (Enrico Colantoni) – Person of Interest
- Squilliam Fancyson (Dee Bradley Baker) – SpongeBob SquarePants
- Fabiana "Bibi Perigosa" Duarte Feitosa (Juliana Paes) – A Força do Querer
- Rubens "Rubinho" Feitosa (Emilio Dantas) – A Força do Querer
- Long Feng (Clancy Brown) – Avatar: The Last Airbender
- Evandro "Evandro do Dendê" Rocha Ferreira (Raphael Logam) – Impuros
- Fred Flintstone (Maurice LaMarche) – Harvey Birdman
- Yessica "La Diabla" Franco (María Fernanda Yépez) – Sin senos no hay paraíso
- Gustavo Fring (Giancarlo Esposito) – Breaking Bad and Better Call Saul
- Miguel Galindo (Danny Pino) – Mayans MC
- Escobar Gallardo (Robert LaSardo) – Nip/Tuck
- Fausto Galvan (Ramón Franco) – The Bridge
- Declan Gardiner (Kim Coates) – Bad Blood
- Lamberto Garza (José Elías Moreno) – El Dragón: Return of a Warrior
- Miguel Garza (Sebastián Rulli) – El Dragón: Return of a Warrior
- Giorno Giovanna (Kenshō Ono) – JoJo's Bizarre Adventure (TV series)
- Giovanni (Ted Lewis) – Pokémon
- Martín "El Fresita" González (Manolo Cardona) – El Cartel
- Gato Gordo (Dagoberto Gama) – Sin senos sí hay paraíso
- The Greek (Bill Raymond) – The Wire
- Steven Green (Victor Slezak) – Law & Order
- Carlos Guerrero (Rudolf Martin) – Dexter
- Diego Gutierrez (Lobo Sebastian) – Castle
- Raoul "El Cid" Hernandez (Luis Guzmán) – Oz
- Andy Hunter (Michael Higgs) – EastEnders
- Don Charles "Chickie" Invernizzi (Domenick Lombardozzi) – Tulsa King
- Don Pete "The Rock" Invernizzi (A.C. Peterson) – Tulsa King
- Aurelio "El Titi" Jaramillo (Gregorio Pernía) – Sin senos sí hay paraíso and El final del paraíso
- Pedro Pablo "El Capo" León Jaramillo (Marlon Moreno) – El Capo
- Alicia Jimenez (Ana de la Reguera) – Power
- Diego Jimenez (Maurice Compte) – Power (TV Series)
- Milton "El Cabo" Jiménez (Róbinson Diaz) – El Cartel
- Ramiz Karaeski (Tuncel Kurtiz) – Ezel (TV series)
- Dark Kat (Brock Peters) – Swat Kats
- Jae Kim (Kelvin Han Yee) – SWAT
- Frank Kinsella (Aidan Gillen) – Kin
- Victor Kiriakis (John Aniston) – Days of Our Lives
- Ryuichiro Kuroda (Dan Green) – Gokusen
- Saya Kuroki (Lana Condor) – Deadly Class
- Don Damiano "Minu" La Piana (Adriano Chiaramida) – ZeroZeroZero
- Fearless Leader (Bill Scott) – The Adventures of Rocky and Bullwinkle and Friends
- Clifford Lee (François Chau) – Castle
- Phil Leotardo (Frank Vincent) – The Sopranos
- Henry Lin (Kenneth Choi) – Sons of Anarchy
- Willie Lewis (Luke Tennie) – Deadly Class
- Enrique Leyra (Víctor Huggo Martín) – ZeroZeroZero
- Jacinto Leyra (Flavio Medina) – ZeroZeroZero
- Felipe Lobos (Enrique Murciano) – Power
- El Malo (Pancho Cardena) – SWAT
- Mario "Don Mario" Lopera (Santiago Moure) – El Cartel
- War Lord (Philip Madoc) – Doctor Who
- Big Louie – Teenage Mutant Ninja Turtles (1987)
- Ray Luca (Anthony Denison) – Crime Story
- Carmine Lupertazzi (Tony Lip) – The Sopranos
- Brandy Lynn (Siobhan Williams) – Deadly Class
- Dwight "The General" Manfredi (Sylvester Stallone) – Tulsa King
- Bruno Mannheim (Bruce Weitz) – Superman: The Animated Series
- Salvatore Maranzano (Cris D'Annunzio) – Torchwood
- Frank Masucci (Charles Cioffi) – Law & Order
- Milo McCrary (John J. York) – Drake & Josh Go Hollywood
- Pinky McFingers – Teenage Mutant Ninja Turtles (1987)
- Fish Mooney (Jada Pinkett Smith) – Gotham
- Enrique Morales (David Zayas) – Oz
- Jason Morgan (Steve Burton) – General Hospital
- Dayana "La Demonia" Muriel (Elianis Garrido) – El final del paraíso
- Adelei Niska (Michael Fairman) – Firefly
- Jim Moriarty (Andrew Scott) – Sherlock
- Clay Morrow (Ron Perlman) – Sons of Anarchy
- Gregório Evangelista "Grego" Mourão (Caio Castro) – I Love Paraisopolis
- Alberto Napoli (Frank Savino) – Law & Order
- Antonio Nappa (Mark Margolis) – Oz
- Omar Navarro (Felix Solis) – Ozark
- Chucky Pancamo (Chuck Zito) – Oz
- Humberto "Humber" Paredes (Juan Ángel) – El Cartel
- Leonel Pavão (Castrinho) – Poder Paralelo
- Big Fat Paulie (Michael Chiklis) – Family Guy
- Domingo "El Ojo" Peña (Juan Carlos Cantu) – NCIS: Los Angeles
- Álvaro José "Guadaña" Pérez (Julian Arango) – El Cartel
- Rick Pinzolo (Stanley Tucci) – Wiseguy
- Jake Pirovic (Fletcher Humphrys) – Home and Away
- Plankton (Doug Lawrence) – SpongeBob SquarePants
- Damon Pope (Harold Perrineau) – Sons Of Anarchy
- Mel Profitt (Kevin Spacey) – Wiseguy
- Leandro Quezada (Miguel Varoni) – Dueños del paraíso
- Rancid Rabbit (Billy West) – CatDog
- Don Vincent Ragni (Joe Perrino) – Power
- Quito Real (Ving Rhames) – UC: Undercover
- Jimmy Reardon (Ian Tracey) – Intelligence
- Burr Redding (Anthony Chisholm) – Oz
- La Reina (Gina Gershon) – Z Nation
- Alfonso "Anestesia" Rendón (Andrés Parra) – El Cartel
- Frederico Righetti (Joseph Ragno) – Law & Order
- Nicolo Rizzuto (Paul Sorvino) – Bad Blood
- Vito Rizzuto (Anthony LaPaglia) – Bad Blood
- Doctor Ivo Robotnik (Long John Baldry) – Adventures of Sonic the Hedgehog
- Roxana "El Profesor" Rodiles (Fernanda Castillo) – Enemigo íntimo
- Rodolfo Espinosa "El Guapo" Roldán (Julio Bracho) – Operación Pacífico
- Finn Rourke (James Cosmo) – Castle
- John "Johnny Sack" Sacrimoni (Vincent Curatola) – The Sopranos
- Hector Salamanca (Mark Margolis) – Breaking Bad and Better Call Saul
- Tuco Salamanca (Raymond Cruz) – Breaking Bad and Better Call Saul
- Esteban Salazar (Jonathan P. Nichols) – The Rookie
- Hector Salazar (Vincent Laresca) – 24
- Lucrecia Salazar (Ofelia Medina) – The Mosquito Coast
- Ramon Salazar (Joaquim de Almeida) – 24
- Giuseppe "Dom Peppino" Sarti (Lima Duarte) – I Love Paraisopolis
- Nino Schibetta (Tony Musante) – Oz
- Peter Schibetta (Eddie Malavarca) – Oz
- Vernon Schillinger (J. K. Simmons) – Oz
- Osi Shima (Eijiro Ozaki) – Magnum, P.I.
- Jacson da Silva (Heitor Martinez) – Vidas Opostas
- Wellington "Sabiá" Silvino (Jonathan Azevedo) – A Força do Querer
- Vulcan Simmons (Jonathan Adams) – Castle
- Soledad (Selene Luna) – Mayans M.C.
- Anthony "Tony" Soprano (James Gandolfini) – The Sopranos
- Corrado "Junior" Soprano (Dominic Chianese) – The Sopranos
- James "Ghost" St. Patrick (Omari Hardwick) – Power
- Marlo Stanfield (Jamie Hector) – The Wire
- Sonny Steelgrave (Ray Sharkey) – Wiseguy
- James Stenbeck (Anthony Herrera) – As the World Turns
- Joseph "Proposition Joe" Stewart (Robert F. Chew) – The Wire
- Ernest Strepfinger (Tim Curry, Brad Garrett, and Jim Cummings) – Ozzy & Drix
- Jackson "Jax" Teller (Charlie Hunnam) – Sons Of Anarchy
- John Thomas "J.T." Teller (Victor Newmark) – Sons Of Anarchy
- Nucky Thompson (Steve Buscemi) – Boardwalk Empire
- Rupert Thorne (John Vernon) – Batman: The Animated Series
- Johnny Torrio (Greg Antonacci) – Boardwalk Empire
- Gonzalo "Buñuelo" Tovar (Juan Carlos Arango) – El Cartel
- Don Antonio Treviño (Dagoberto Gama) – Camelia la Texana
- Ron Tully (Marilyn Manson) – Sons of Anarchy
- Master Udon (Pat Morita) – SpongeBob SquarePants
- Fermín "El Tigre" Urrego (Waldo Urrego) – El Cartel
- Valmont (Julian Sands) – Jackie Chan Adventures
- Tony "The Butcher" Valtini (Jamie McShane) – Castle
- Rumualdo Vasco (Andy Garcia) – Flipped
- Nelo "El Diablo" Venegas (Luis Carazo) – SWAT
- Bruno Vilar (Marcelo Serrado) – Poder Paralelo
- Tony Vivaldi – Teenage Mutant Ninja Turtles (1987)
- Don Vizioso (Brian Bloom) – Teenage Mutant Ninja Turtles (2012)
- Constantin Volsky (Olek Krupa) – Law & Order
- Spiros Vondopoulos (Paul Ben-Victor) – The Wire
- Don Eladio Vuente (Steven Bauer) – Breaking Bad and Better Call Saul
- Sonny Walker (William Forsythe) – UC: Undercover
- Deverin "Bunny" Washington (Tobi Bamtefa) – Mayor of Kingstown
- Jack Welker (Michael Bowen) – Breaking Bad
- Walter White (Bryan Cranston) – Breaking Bad
- Johnny Zacchara (Brandon Barash) – General Hospital
- Ismael Zambrano (Diego Vásquez) – El Chapo
- Juan Diego "El Catrin" Zamora (Juan Pablo Raba) – Coyote
- Sancho Zamora (Steven Bauer) – SWAT
- Ulan Zamora (Ulysses Montoya) – SWAT
- Sartana of the Dead (Susan Silo) – El Tigre: The Adventures of Manny Rivera
- Annalisa Zucca (Sofia Milos) – The Sopranos
- Tony Zucco (Thomas F. Wilson and Mark Hamill) – Batman: The Animated Series and The Batman
- Süleyman Çakır (Oktay Kaynarca) – Valley of the Wolves (TV series)
- Ransik (Vernon Wells) – Power Rangers Time Force
- Lazaro Madrigal (Dante Ponce) – Pasion de Amor
- Fabian Solomon (Dante Rivero) – The Blood Sisters

== In video games ==
- Kazuo Akuji – Saints Row 2
- Shogo Akuji (Yuri Lowenthal) – Saints Row 2
- Archie – Pokémon Sapphire and Pokémon Emerald
- Baka – Fallout demo
- Baka – Mafia 3
- Esteban Bautista (Benito Martinez) – Army of Two: The Devil's Cartel
- Micah Bell (Peter Blomquist) – Red Dead Redemption 2
- Bad Bessie (Heather Simms) – Red Dead Revolver
- John Bishop – Fallout 2
- The Boss – Saints Row 2, Saints Row: The Third, and Saints Row IV
- Angelo Bronte (Jim Pirri) – Red Dead Redemption 2
- Bullet – The Warriors
- Thomas Burke – Mafia 3
- Bruto Cadaverini – Phoenix Wright: Ace Attorney − Trials and Tribulations
- Avery Carrington (Burt Reynolds) – Grand Theft Auto: Vice City, Grand Theft Auto: San Andreas, and Grand Theft Auto: Liberty City Stories
- Cassandra – Mafia 3
- Catalina (Cynthia Farrell) – Grand Theft Auto III and Grand Theft Auto: San Andreas
- Lincoln Clay (Alex Hernandez) – Mafia 3
- Cleon (Dorsey Wright) – The Warriors
- Alberto Clemente (Nolan North) – Mafia 2
- Chatterbox (Jordan Gelber) – The Warriors
- Wei Cheng (George Cheung) – Grand Theft Auto V
- Crackerjack (Adam Sietz) – The Warriors
- Jacob Crow (Wayne Forester) – TimeSplitters: Future Perfect
- Cobb – The Warriors
- The Colonel – TimeSplitters 2
- Vito Corleone (Doug Abrahams) – The Godfather
- Don Corneo – Final Fantasy VII
- Colonel Juan García Cortez (Robert Davi) – Grand Theft Auto: Vice City and Grand Theft Auto: Vice City Stories
- Cyrus – Pokémon Diamond and Pearl
- Cyrus (Michael Potts) – The Warriors
- Butch DeLoria (Craig Sechler) – Fallout 3
- Viola DeWynter (Sasha Grey) – Saints Row: The Third and Saints Row: Gat out of Hell
- Ricardo Diaz (Luis Guzmán) – Grand Theft Auto: Vice City and Grand Theft Auto: Vice City Stories
- Diego (Lloyd Floyd) – The Warriors
- Donny – TimeSplitters: Future Perfect
- Edge (El-P) – The Warriors
- Javier Escuella (Antonio Jaramillo) – Red Dead Redemption
- Carlo Falcone (André Sogliuzzo) – Mafia 2
- Mikhail Faustin (Karel Roden) – Grand Theft Auto IV
- Fuyuhiko Kuzuryu – Danganronpa 2: Goodbye Despair
- Mondo Owada – Danganronpa: Trigger Happy Havoc
- Sonny Forelli (Tom Sizemore) – Grand Theft Auto: Vice City
- Paulie Franchetti (Dwight Schultz) – The Darkness
- Valeria "El Sin Nombre" Garza (Maria Elisa Camargo) – Call of Duty: Modern Warfare II, Call of Duty: Warzone 2.0 and Call of Duty: Warzone Mobile
- The General (Greg Eagles) – Saints Row 2
- Ghost – The Warriors
- The Ghoulfather – Yo-kai Watch 3
- Giovanni – Pokémon Red and Blue and Pokémon FireRed and LeafGreen
- Gizmo (Jim Cummings) – Fallout
- Gonzap – Pokémon Colosseum and Pokémon XD: Gale of Darkness
- Jon Gravelli (Madison Arnold) – Grand Theft Auto IV
- Greevil – Pokémon XD: Gale of Darkness
- Joon-gi Han (Yuichi Nakamura and Keong Sim) – Yakuza 6
- Sean "Sweet" Johnson (Faizon Love) – Grand Theft Auto: San Andreas
- Jonah (Poison Pen) – The Warriors
- Pig Josh (Dennis Ostermaier) – Red Dead Revolver
- Junya Kaneshiro (Kazunari Tanaka) – Persona 5
- Asuka Kasen (Lianna Pai) – Grand Theft Auto III
- Kazuki Kasen (Keenan Shimizu) – Grand Theft Auto: Liberty City Stories
- Kenji Kasen (Les J.N. Mau) – "Grand Theft Auto III"
- Archibald Khallos (Les Spink and Mac McDonald) – TimeSplitters 2 and TimeSplitters: Future Perfect
- Eddie "Killbane" Pryor (Rick D. Wasserman) – Saints Row: The Third
- Benjamin King (Michael Clarke Duncan and Terry Crews) – Saints Row and Saints Row IV
- The King (James Horan) – Fallout: New Vegas
- Johnny Klebitz (Scott Hill) – Grand Theft Auto IV, Grand Theft Auto IV: The Lost and Damned and Grand Theft Auto V
- Knox (Lee Aaron Rosen) – The Warriors
- Krew (William Minkin) – Jak II
- Vladimir Lem (Dominic Hawksley and Jonathan Davis) – Max Payne and Max Payne 2: The Fall of Max Payne
- Salvatore Leone (Frank Vincent) – Grand Theft Auto III, Grand Theft Auto: San Andreas, and Grand Theft Auto: Liberty City Stories
- Julius Little (Keith David) – Saints Row, Saints Row 2, and Saints Row IV
- Angelo Lopez (Freddy Rodriguez) – Saints Row
- Hector Lopez (Joaquim de Almeida) – Saints Row
- Phillipe Loren (Jacques Hennequet) – Saints Row: The Third
- Donald Love (Kyle MacLachlan and Will Janowitz) – Grand Theft Auto III, Grand Theft Auto: Vice City, and Grand Theft Auto: Liberty City Stories
- Walton Lowe (P.J. Sosko) – Red Dead Redemption
- Luther (Oliver Wyman) – The Warriors
- Martin Madrazo (Alfredo Huereca) – Grand Theft Auto V
- Maero (Michael Dorn) – Saints Row 2 and Saints Row IV
- Mafioso – the name of a skin of a playable character in the Roblox game Forsaken
- Goro Majima (Hidenari Ugaki and Mark Hamill) – Yakuza
- Sal Marcano (Jay Acovone) – Mafia 3
- Masai (Charles Parnell) – The Warriors
- Maxie – Pokémon Ruby and Sapphire and Pokémon Emerald
- Juan "Juarez" Mendoza (Rene Mujica) – Call of Juarez and Call of Juarez: Bound in Blood
- Juan Mendoza (Sal Lopez) – Call of Juarez: The Cartel
- Jon Ming – Tom Clancy's Splinter Cell: Operation Barracuda and Tom Clancy's Elite Squad
- Matt Miller (Yuri Lowenthal) – Saints Row: The Third
- Big Moe (Billy Griffith) – The Warriors
- Big Jesus Mordino – Fallout 2
- Don Marcu Morello (John Doman and Saul Stein) – Mafia and Mafia: Definitive Edition
- Muggshot the Bulldog (Kevin Blackton) – Sly Cooper
- Colm O'Driscoll (Andrew Berg) – Red Dead Redemption 2
- Manuel Orejuela (Carlos Ferro) – Saints Row
- Kokichi Ouma – Danganronpa V3: Killing Harmony
- Jimmy Pegorino (Tony Patellis) – Grand Theft Auto IV
- Rodrigo Carlos "El Sueño" Pérez Morales (Saro Solis) – Tom Clancy's Ghost Recon Wildlands and Tom Clancy's Elite Squad
- Pharaoh (Lemon Andersen) – The Warriors
- Trevor Philips (Steven Ogg) – Grand Theft Auto V
- Don Pianta – Paper Mario: The Thousand-Year Door
- Joseph Price (Gregory Sims) – Saints Row
- Angelo Punchinello (Joe Ragno) – Max Payne
- Dimitri Rascalov (Moti Margolin) – Grand Theft Auto IV
- Rayze – Fallout demo
- Andre Richardson (Charles Glover) – Yakuza 3
- Motor-Runner (Jesse Burch) – Fallout: New Vegas
- Sadako – TimeSplitters 2
- Don Ennio Salieri (George DiCenzo and Glenn Taranto) – Mafia and Mafia: Definitive Edition
- Louis Salvatore – Fallout 2
- Vito Scaletta (Rick Pasqualone) – Mafia 2 and Mafia 3
- William Sharp (David Carradine) – Saints Row
- Sid (Dennis L. A. White) – The Warriors
- Spider (Michael Goz) – The Warriors
- Starr (Maine Anders) – The Warriors
- Sully (Robert Cihra) – The Warriors
- Swan (Michael Beck) – The Warriors
- Tiny (James Lorenzo) – The Warriors
- Aria T'Loak (Carrie-Anne Moss) – Mass Effect 2
- Big Tony – TimeSplitters 2
- Massimo Torini (Duccio Fraggella) – Grand Theft Auto: Liberty City Stories
- Tracer (Holter Graham) – The Warriors
- Aldo Trapani (Andrew Pifko) – The Godfather
- Vance (Holter Graham) – The Warriors
- Victor Vance (Armando Riesco and Dorian Missick) – Grand Theft Auto: Vice City and Grand Theft Auto: Vice City Stories
- Dutch van der Linde (Benjamin Byron Davis) – Red Dead Redemption and Red Dead Redemption 2
- Vargas (The Greg Wilson) – The Warriors
- Tommy Vercetti (Ray Liotta) – Grand Theft Auto: Vice City
- Franco "Frank" Vinci (Larry Kenney) – Mafia 2
- Virgil (Curtiss Cook) – The Warriors
- Wario (Charles Martinet) – Mario series
- Don Weaso – Conker's Bad Fur Day
- Marty J. Williams (Jim Burke) – Grand Theft Auto: Vice City Stories
- Bill Williamson (Steve J. Palmer) – Red Dead Redemption
- Orville Wright – Fallout 2
- Mr. X – Bare Knuckle, Bare Knuckle II, and Bare Knuckle III
- Horace Belger – Final Fight
- Dardan Petrela - Grand Theft Auto IV
- Bernardo Torrisi (Bernardo Torrisi) – Mafia: The Old Country
- Ruggero Spadaro (Ruggero Spadaro) – Mafia: The Old Country

== See also ==
- List of crime bosses
