= Sound of Thunder =

Sound of Thunder or A Sound of Thunder may refer to:

- "A Sound of Thunder", a science fiction short story by Ray Bradbury
- A Sound of Thunder (film), an adaptation of the story
- A Sound of Thunder (band), an American heavy metal band
- A Sound of Thunder (video game), based on the film
- The Sound of Thunder, a novel by Taylor Caldwell.
- The Sound of Thunder, a novel by Wilbur Smith
- The Sound of Thunder (film), a 1957 Australian television play
- "Sound of Thunder", a single from Duran Duran (1981 album), and inspired by the short story
- "The Sound of Thunder", an episode of the second season of Star Trek: Discovery
