= ASOT =

ASOT may stand for:

- Antistreptolysin O titre
- A State of Trance, a radio show hosted by Armin van Buuren
- A Sound of Thunder (disambiguation)
- "A series of tubes", phrase coined originally as an analogy by then-U.S. Senator Ted Stevens to describe the Internet in the context of opposing network neutrality.
- Asot Michael, Antiguan politician
