= Grand Theft Auto: Liberty City Stories =

2005 action-adventure game

- Developers: Rockstar Leeds; Rockstar North (Note: Ported to Android, Fire OS, and iOS by Lucid Games)
- Publisher: Rockstar Games
- Producer: Leslie Benzies
- Designer: David Bland
- Programmers: Obbe Vermeij; Adam Fowler; Andrew Greensmith; Matthew Shepcar
- Artists: Aaron Garbut; Ian Bowden
- Writers: Dan Houser; James Worrall; David Bland
- Composers: John Cacavas; Sonia Slany; K. Tatham
- Series: Grand Theft Auto
- Platforms: PlayStation Portable; PlayStation 2; iOS; Android; Fire OS
- Release: 25 October 2005: PlayStation Portable; NA: 25 October 2005; PAL: 4 November 2005 PlayStation 2; NA: 6 June 2006; EU: 23 June 2006 iOS; WW: 17 December 2015 Android; WW: 11 February 2016 Fire OS; WW: 11 March 2016
- Genre: Action-adventure
- Modes: Single-player, multiplayer (PSP)

Grand Theft Auto: Liberty City Stories is a 2005 action-adventure game developed in a collaboration between Rockstar Leeds and Rockstar North, and published by Rockstar Games. The ninth installment in the Grand Theft Auto series, it was initially released as a PlayStation Portable exclusive in October 2005. A port for the PlayStation 2 was later released in June 2006. At the time of release, the recommended retail price of the PS2 port was around half the price of the PSP version, because the PS2 version does not feature the custom soundtrack ripping capability of the PSP version. Ports for iOS, Android and Fire OS devices were also released in December 2015, February 2016, and March 2016, respectively.

The game is the first 3D title in the series to be released for handheld devices, and acts as a prequel to 2001's Grand Theft Auto III, using the same setting of Liberty City (a fictional parody of New York City). The single-player story, set in 1998, follows mobster Toni Cipriani, a character first introduced in Grand Theft Auto III, and his efforts to rise through the ranks of the Leone crime family, while slowly becoming involved in a power struggle among the city's various Mafia organisations. The PSP version of the game also includes a multiplayer mode through a wireless ad hoc network, which allows up to six players to engage in several different game modes.

Liberty City Stories received generally positive reviews from critics, and was a commercial success, selling over 8 million copies as of March 2008. It is one of the best-selling PlayStation Portable games. It was followed in October 2006 by Grand Theft Auto: Vice City Stories, a prequel to 2002's Grand Theft Auto: Vice City.

== Gameplay ==
Toni on Staunton Island riding a PCJ-600 motorcycle with a sub-machine gun equipped and with a two-star wanted level

Grand Theft Auto: Liberty City Stories is an action-adventure game set in an open world environment and played from a third-person perspective. Liberty City's layout is largely similar to Grand Theft Auto III, but it also incorporates elements found in Grand Theft Auto III's successors, such as more indoor environments, clothing changes, and motorcycles. Though flyable aeroplanes and helicopters are available in Vice City and San Andreas, flyable aeroplanes cannot be found in Liberty City Stories while helicopters are only accessible through certain exploits. In keeping with recent Grand Theft Auto games, the player has more flexibility in terms of moving the camera around for viewing surroundings (Grand Theft Auto III is noticeably limited in that respect). In contrast to the previous release in the "3D Universe", Grand Theft Auto: San Andreas, the Liberty City Stories protagonist lacks the ability to climb and the ability to swim – contact with deep bodies of water is instantly fatal. The overall game's open world, as it is based upon the original Liberty City layout, is considerably smaller than that of San Andreas.

The PSP version of Liberty City Stories has a multiplayer mode, for up to six players through Wi-Fi ad-hoc mode (same area). The game features seven modes of wireless multiplayer gaming, in which various pedestrian and character models are from the single player mode avatars. These multiplayer modes were removed in the PS2 and mobile versions.

== Synopsis ==
=== Setting ===
Liberty City Stories takes place in early 1998 within the fictional Liberty City (based on the real life New York City), and forms part of the "3D Universe" canon of the Grand Theft Auto series. Set three years before the events of Grand Theft Auto III, the game's setting features several areas that are different from the 2001 version of Liberty City, including locations that are being constructed, or facilities and buildings that are demolished by 2001. For instance, the Callahan Bridge is unfinished in 1998 so a ferry service is the main link between Staunton Island and Portland. Another example is Fort Staunton, initially a "Little Italy" district in the game, until events later in the storyline lead to it being mostly destroyed and becoming a construction site by 2001.

=== Characters ===
Like previous Grand Theft Auto games, Liberty City Stories features an array of notable actors in its cast. Several characters from Grand Theft Auto III make appearances in the game, receiving notable changes in appearance and lifestyles to reflect who they were in 1998. Although Frank Vincent, Guru, and Sondra James return to reprise their roles as Salvatore Leone, 8-Ball, and Ma Cipriani, respectively, from Grand Theft Auto III (and, in Vincent's case, also Grand Theft Auto: San Andreas), other returning characters from Grand Theft Auto III were voiced by new actors. For instance, Danny Mastrogiorgio replaced Michael Madsen as Toni Cipriani, Fiona Gallagher replaced Debi Mazar as Maria Latore, Peter Appel replaced Robert Loggia as Ray Machowski, and Will Janowitz replaced Kyle MacLachlan as Donald Love.

=== Plot ===
In 1998, Leone mobster Antonio "Toni" Cipriani (Danny Mastrogiorgio), returns home to Liberty City, living four years abroad for killing a made man. His boss, Don Salvatore Leone (Frank Vincent), welcomes him back and assigns him to work under another Leone mobster, Vincenzo "Lucky" Cilli (Joe Lo Truglio), who despises Toni. Meanwhile, Toni meets Joseph Daniel "JD" O'Toole (Greg Wilson), a member of the rival Sindacco family looking to switch allegiances, and works with him to take down the Sindaccos. Later, Toni is set up by Vincenzo to be arrested during a job, but escapes and cuts ties with Vincenzo.

During these jobs, Toni discovers that Sicilian Mafia underboss Massimo Torini is orchestrating plans for other gangs to take territory from the Leones', as well as the Sindacco and Forelli families after their tributes dried up. After Toni helps him take over a Sindacco club, JD is invited to join the Leones as a made man. However, Salvatore has JD killed, believing he would betray them as well. Toni also learns his mother (Sondra James) disapproves of his low rank in the Leone family and attempts to impress her, but is disowned when she eventually calls a hit on him. Soon, Salvatore begins giving Toni direct assignments, including looking after his trophy wife, Maria (Fiona Gallagher).

As Toni earns Salvatore's trust, Vincenzo soon becomes jealous of his successes in the Leone family and lures him into an ambush to be killed, but Toni survives and kills Vincenzo.

Salvatore sends Toni to secure a cash stash from a Leone-owned warehouse, but the location is ambushed and destroyed by the rival Chinese Triads. Toni successfully eliminates the attackers and recovers the money safely. In response, Liberty City's corrupt mayor, Roger C. Hole—who is secretly under the control of the rival Forelli crime family—attempts to have Salvatore arrested. Evading the police spotlight, Salvatore and Toni are forced to flee together to Staunton Island.

On Salvatore's instructions, Toni assassinates Mayor Hole while he is out morning jogging in Belleville Park. Following this, Salvatore officially inducts Toni into the family as a "made man". This heavily pleases Toni's mother, calling off the hit on him. Realizing that the late mayor was a political tool for the Forellis, Salvatore decides to gain political control over the city by financing billionaire business tycoon Donald Love (Will Janowitz) as a candidate in the upcoming mayoral election, with Toni assisting his campaign.

However, Donald goes bankrupt after his ties to the Leones are discovered and loses the election to Miles O'Donovon (John Braden), who soon has Salvatore arrested. Toni remains loyal to Salvatore, working for him from prison, soon killing Don Paulie Sindacco (Jeff Gurner) for his involvement in Salvatore's arrest.

Later, Donald enlists Toni's help in rebuilding his fortune; having Toni kill his former mentor Avery Carrington, steal his city development plans, and destroy the Forelli-controlled district of Fort Staunton with explosives. Afterwards Donald's company would receive funding to re-develop it. Meanwhile, Toni is manipulated into committing crimes to further the career of news reporter Ned Burner (Peter Bradbury), whom Toni kills to prevent his and Donald's crimes from being exposed.

While imprisoned, Salvatore learns that the Yakuza are stockpiling heavy military weapons, including a Rhino tank, in an attempt to take over Liberty City. Following Salvatore's orders, Toni infiltrates their compound, steals the tank, and successfully destroys it.

This crippling blow catches the attention of Toshiko Kasen (Hana Moon), the neglected wife of Yakuza leader Kazuki Kasen (Keenan Shimizu). Enraged that her husband chose to spend his time expanding his criminal empire rather than being with her, Toshiko hires Toni to systematically sabotage and humiliate Kazuki's operations. As part of these efforts, Toni inflicts massive damage on Kazuki's weapon caches and businesses, and intercepts and destroys a van transporting Kazuki's money straight from his compound. Furious at these severe disruptions, Kazuki plots to eliminate both Toni and his own wife. Acting in self-defense, Toni confronts and kills Kazuki at his casino. Following this hit, a heavily guilt-ridden and lonely Toshiko commits suicide by jumping from her apartment window.

As the Leone mob family comes out on top over the Sindaccos and Forellis, Salvatore is targeted by the Sicilian Mafia, forcing Toni to protect him before his trial. Released on bail, Salvatore and Toni learn Torini orchestrated the mob war, rigged the mayoral elections, and Salvatore's arrest. Torini soon kidnaps O'Donovon to prevent him from dropping Salvatore's charges. Toni and Salvatore rescue O'Donovon, confronting and killing Torini at a lighthouse. Salvatore coerces O'Donovon into working under the Leones', before he and Toni confront his uncle (Bruce MacVittie), Don of the Sicilian Mafia and Torini's boss. Uncle Leone feigns ignorance of Torini's actions but returns to Sicily, swearing off the Sicilians' invasion. With the Leones now controlling Liberty City, Salvatore has Toni promoted to caporegime as repayment for his assistance.

== Development ==
As stated in an IGN preview, "Rockstar dropped Renderware in favor of a brand new in-house engine to best utilize the resolution, texture density and particle effects of the PSP". Until the release of Liberty City Stories, RenderWare had been the game engine behind every 3D game in the Grand Theft Auto III era. Liberty City Stories used Image Metrics for the game's facial animation.

In April 2013, the game was released on PlayStation 3 via the PlayStation Network using the PlayStation 2 backward compatibility.

An enhanced port of the game, with touchscreen controls, real-time lighting, high-definition textures and draw distance, was released in December 2015 for iOS, February 2016 for Android and March 2016 for Fire OS.

== Soundtrack ==
Liberty City Stories features ten radio stations, which consist of a mix of both licensed music and tracks created specifically for the game, and talk radio stations. A feature for the PSP version of the game is the ability to listen to custom soundtracks.

To implement the custom soundtrack feature, Rockstar placed the application called "Rockstar Custom Tracks v1.0" on the official site under the "Downloads" section. This then gave people the chance to use the custom soundtracks feature. The application is based on Exact Audio Copy.

The soundtrack of Grand Theft Auto: Liberty City Stories features some well known artists from various musical and cultural backgrounds.Radio Del Mundo includes Belgian-born singer Natacha Atlas, known for blending traditional musical influences with electronic styles, Israeli singer Ofra Haza, who combines traditional Jewish-Yemenite music with contemporary pop, and Indian playback singer Asha Bhosle, known for her contributions to Indian cinema.

== Reception ==
Reception

Aggregate score
Aggregator	Score	
Aggregator	PS2	PSP
Metacritic	78/100	88/100

Review scores
Publication	Score	
Publication	PS2	PSP
1Up.com	A	A
Eurogamer	8/10	9/10
GameSpot	7.1/10	8.6/10
GameTrailers	N/A	9.1/10
IGN	8/10	9/10
PlayStation Official Magazine – UK	9/10	N/A

Grand Theft Auto: Liberty City Stories received "generally favorable reviews" on both platforms from critics, according to review aggregator website Metacritic.

During the 9th Annual Interactive Achievement Awards, the Academy of Interactive Arts & Sciences nominated Liberty City Stories for "Handheld Game of the Year", which was ultimately awarded to Nintendogs.

=== Sales ===
In the United States, the PlayStation 2 version of Liberty City Stories had sold 1 million copies by February 2007. In the United States alone, Liberty City Stories' PSP release sold 980,000 copies and earned $48 million by August 2006. During the period between January 2000 and August 2006, it was the 16th highest-selling handheld game across all platforms in that country. As of 26 March 2008, Liberty City Stories sold 8 million copies according to Take-Two Interactive. The PlayStation Portable version of Liberty City Stories received a "Double Platinum" sales award from the Entertainment and Leisure Software Publishers Association (ELSPA), indicating sales of at least 600,000 copies in the United Kingdom. ELSPA gave the game's PlayStation 2 version a "Platinum" certification, for sales of at least 300,000 copies in the region. As of July 2013, the PSP version has sold over 7.5 million units worldwide.
