= Beaterator =

2009 video game

- Developer: Rockstar Leeds
- Publisher: Rockstar Games
- Director: Jay Capozello
- Producer: Rich Rosado
- Designer: Andrew Minghella
- Programmer: Warren Merrifield
- Artists: Ian J Bowden; Rob Nelson
- Composer: Timbaland
- Platforms: PlayStation Portable, iOS
- Release: PlayStation Portable: NA: 29 September 2009; PAL: 2 October 2009; iOS; 7 December 2009
- Genres: Music, puzzle
- Mode: Single-player

Beaterator is a music mixer released in September 2009 by Rockstar Games for the PlayStation Portable and in December 2009 for iOS. Beaterator was developed by Rockstar Leeds in collaboration with Timbaland.

The game is based on an Adobe Flash music mixing tool released on the Internet in 2005 by Rockstar and contains original new loops and sounds produced by Timbaland for Beaterator. The game allows the user to produce their own loops. There are three game modes: Live play, Studio Session and Song Crafter. The game has Rockstar Games Social Club integration for sharing music with the community.

To celebrate the game's release, Rockstar Games held an event in PlayStation Home at the Listen@Home station in North America's Central Plaza on 16 October 2009. Attendees could play select user-uploaded Beaterator tracks during the event. On 10 June 2014, the GameSpy service was discontinued, taking with it Beaterator's Social Club features.

== Reception ==
Reception

Aggregate score
Aggregator	Score	
Aggregator	iOS	PSP
Metacritic	N/A	80/100

Review scores
Publication	Score	
Publication	iOS	PSP
1Up.com	N/A	A−
Eurogamer	N/A	8/10
GamePro	N/A	3.5/5
GamesMaster	N/A	80%
GamesRadar+	N/A	4/5
GameZone	N/A	8/10
IGN	7/10	8/10
Pocket Gamer	2.5/5	4/5
PlayStation: The Official Magazine	N/A	4/5
VideoGamer.com	N/A	8/10
The Daily Telegraph	N/A	10/10

The PSP version of Beaterator received generally favorable reviews, while the iOS version received "mixed" reviews, according to the review aggregation website Metacritic. Australian video game talk show Good Game's reviewers, Jeremy Ray and Steven O'Donnell, awarded the game scores of 6/10 and 7/10, respectively.
