= WWF WrestleMania (1991 video game) =

- Amiga cover art with Sgt. Slaughter, Hulk Hogan, and the British Bulldog
- Developer: Twilight
- Publisher: Ocean Software
- Platforms: Amiga, Amstrad CPC, Atari ST, Commodore 64, MS-DOS, ZX Spectrum
- Release: December 1991
- Genre: Fighting
- Modes: Single-player, multiplayer

WWF WrestleMania is a wrestling video game developed by Twilight and published by Ocean Software in 1991 for the Amiga, Amstrad CPC, Atari ST, Commodore 64, ZX Spectrum, and MS-DOS. Named after the World Wrestling Federation's (WWF) annual pay-per-view event WrestleMania, it was the first WWF licensed game available for these computers, which were still dominant in Europe. It was followed on most of these computers by 1992's WWF European Rampage Tour.

In February 1993, the Spectrum and Amstrad CPC versions were released as part of the Super Fighter compilation with Pit-Fighter and Final Fight.

Visually, the game resembles the arcade video game WWF Superstars, and it plays somewhat similarly as well.

== Gameplay ==
Commodore Amiga version of WWF Wrestlemania

The player can choose from either Hulk Hogan, Ultimate Warrior, or The British Bulldog and must defeat five opponents to become the WWF World Heavyweight Champion. The opponents are, in order, Mr. Perfect, The Warlord, "Million Dollar Man" Ted DiBiase, The Mountie, and Sgt. Slaughter. Before each match, the opponent will taunt the player's wrestler with a comment, and the player will then be able to choose from several replies in a nod to the WWF house style at the time.

Each wrestler is able to perform basic punches and kicks as well as a range of more advanced moves such as dropkicking, clotheslining, and one signature grapple maneuver which is performed by "waggling the joystick". In addition, there is a chair outside the ring which can be used as a weapon. Matches have a five-minute time limit, and a time limit draw or count-out will have the same effect as losing a match. The player has a total of four credits.

The game also features a practice mode in which the player faces a prone opponent. Another player can also control the second wrestler, but it will always be Mr. Perfect.

== Reception ==
Reception

Review scores
Publication	Score
MicroHobby	93% (Spectrum)
Sinclair User	91% (Spectrum)
Your Sinclair	91% (Spectrum)
Crash	83% (Spectrum)

Awards
Publication	Award
Sinclair User	SU Gold
Your Sinclair	Megagame
Amstrad Action	Mastergame

The game was well received. Crash said that Ocean captured the atmosphere of the sport perfectly. Sinclair User liked the game, but criticized the lack of alternate difficulty options. Your Sinclair said that "the graphics in WWF are really slick", and also praised the multiplayer option, which they described as "the best two-player game that's been seen on any Speccy fighting game".

== See also ==
- List of licensed professional wrestling video games
- List of fighting games
