= Alfred Chicken =

1993 platform video game

- European Amiga cover art
- Developer: Twilight: Möbius Entertainment (2000s releases)
- Publishers: Mindscape: SCi Games (GBC); Sony Computer Entertainment (PS1)
- Designers: Jason McGann and Peter Tattersall
- Programmers: Jason McGann and Peter Tattersall: Andrew Swann (Amiga versions); James Smart (NES); Stuart A. Cook (SNES); Matthew Shepcar; Charles Waddington; Graeme Love (GBC); Finlay Munro (PS)
- Artists: Peter Tattersall & Wayne Billingham: Doug Holmes; David Bland (GBC); Ian J. Bowden (PS)
- Composers: David Whittaker: Mark Knight (AMI & SNES); Jim Croft (Voodoo Sound) (PS)
- Platforms: Game Boy: Amiga; Amiga CD32; Game Boy Color; NES; PlayStation; Super NES
- Release: 1993: Game Boy; EU: 1993; NA: February 1994; JP: 29 July 1995; Amiga; EU: 1993; Amiga CD32; EU: 1993; NES; EU: 1993; NA: February 1994; SNES; NA: February 1994; EU: 1994; GBC; EU: September 2000; PS; EU: 12 April 2002
- Genre: Platform
- Mode: Single-player

Alfred Chicken is a platform video game developed by Twilight and published by Mindscape for the Game Boy. It was later ported to the Amiga, Amiga CD32, NES, and Super NES in 1993 and February 1994, in Europe and North America, respectively. A Europe-exclusive remake of the game, entitled Alfred's Adventure, was developed by Möbius Entertainment and released by SCi for Game Boy Color in June 2000. Another remake, named Alfred Chicken, was also developed by King Monkey, a division of Möbius Entertainment, and released by Sony Computer Entertainment for PlayStation in 2002. Rockstar Games does not own the title's rights, despite buying Möbius later on, as Jason McGann personally held the rights.

== Gameplay ==
The player takes the role of a chicken named Alfred who must find his way through bizarre levels full of balloons, telephones, cheese, and other strange elements. While he is on the ground, Alfred can walk, jump, and peck balloons and ground switches. While he is in the air he can dive bomb enemies or springs. Dive bombing enemies will destroy them. Dive bombing springs will bounce Alfred much higher so he can reach platforms well above his normal jumping ability. If he does not hit an enemy or a spring, Alfred will get stuck in the ground for a short time.

To complete a level, Alfred must find and peck all the balloons. The last balloon will take him to a boss fight. If Alfred dies, he starts as an egg located at the last balloon pecked. In the Super NES version, finding the big balloon results in a Stage Clear.

Alfred can receive a few power-ups during the game. For one power-up, he must answer a telephone in secret areas to make Mr. Pekles (a giant flower) give him a pot of jam. The jam gives Alfred the ability to shoot a bomb (about the size of Alfred himself) which bounces around the screen collecting items and hurting enemies. Another power-up is a worm that spins around Alfred destroying enemies that it touches. The player must find a can of worms to get this power-up.

== Release ==
The Game Boy game was the original version. Two revisions exist: the monochrome original, and a Super Game Boy version with a level select feature. The latter was developed by Hookstone and released by Sunsoft in Japan. It was later re-released for Game Boy Color as Alfred's Adventure in 2000.

The Amiga version is the same as the Game Boy game and is identical except for its color graphics and increased screen resolution. The NES edition of the game is essentially a watered-down port of the Game Boy version. It features only five levels, which were originally in the Game Boy game.

The SNES game, Super Alfred Chicken, uses the same mechanics as the prior versions, but has entirely different level layouts and functions as a sequel. It suffered from mediocre reviews.

The game for the original PlayStation was released only in the PAL region. It features 2.5D action and is a brand-new game rather than a port. It was developed by Möbius Entertainment and released by Sony Computer Entertainment Europe in 2002.

An unannounced version for the Sega Genesis was obtained by Piko Interactive in 2016, getting their hands on an unfinished binary from the original developer and intending to finish it up for a tentative 2017 release. However, conflicting rights with the ownership of the Alfred Chicken character have ultimately prevented this to happen as of the present date.

== Marketing ==
Karl Fitzhugh, the Product Manager of the Amiga version of the Alfred Chicken video game, ran as the Alfred Chicken Party candidate in the 1993 Christchurch, Dorset by-election. The exercise was done to promote the original game's release. Fitzhugh finished second last with 18 votes, two votes ahead of the Rainbow Party candidate.

The marketing attempt was partially successful. The Alfred Chicken Party was cited, along with other "frivolous or 'commercial' candidates", as a reason to increase the number of signatures required for an individual to be nominated as a political candidate at an election.

== Reception ==
Reception (Amiga)

Review scores
Publication	Score
Amiga Action	74%
Amiga Computing	86%
Amiga Force	87%
Amiga Format	62%
Amiga Power	70%
Amiga User International	79%
Computer and Video Games	70%
GameZone	CD32: B−

Reception (1990s 8-bit releases)

Review scores
Publication	Score	
Publication	Game Boy	NES
AllGame	N/A	3.5/5
Electronic Gaming Monthly	N/A	5/10
Famitsu	22/40	N/A
GamePro	N/A	4.25/5
GameZone	90%	88%
Nintendo Power	N/A	3/5
Total!	85%	80%
GB Action	92%	N/A
N-Force	88%	N/A

Reception (Super Alfred Chicken)

Review scores
Publication	Score
Computer and Video Games	75%
Electronic Gaming Monthly	8/10, 7/10, 7/10, 5/10, 6/10
Super Play	83%
Super Action	72%
Super Control	75%
Super Pro	69/100

Reception (2000s releases)

Review scores
Publication	Score	
Publication	GBC	PS
Computer and Video Games	N/A	6/10
HobbyConsolas	N/A	38/100
Official Nintendo Magazine	80%	N/A
PlayStation Official Magazine – Australia	N/A	2/10
PlayStation Official Magazine – UK	N/A	6/10
Super Game Power	N/A	7.5/10
64	80%	N/A
Game - The Game Boy Color Mag	8/10	N/A
PSX Extreme	N/A	6+
Total Game Boy Color	80%	N/A

Electronic Gaming Monthly gave the Super NES version a 6.6 out of 10, calling it "a slow-moving game requiring more strategy than being able to run, jump and grab items! It takes a while to get into the swing of it, though." They gave the NES version a 5 out of 10, explaining that it retains the large levels and good controls of the Super NES version, but that the drastically lower quality graphics and sounds make the game less enjoyable. Reviewing the NES version, GamePro praised the challenging gameplay, the "cartoony" graphics, the "bouncy, loopy audio", and the "crisp controls", and determined the game to be a must-have for NES fans in light of how few games were being released for the system at that point. On release, Famicom Tsūshin scored the Game Boy version of the game a 22 out of 40. In Nintendo Power, the NES version was scored a three out of five. While they did like the big sizes of each level and occasionally comical graphics, they ultimately found it to be just another typical platformer.
