= Cool World =

1992 film by Ralph Bakshi

- Theatrical release poster
- Directed by: Ralph Bakshi
- Written by: Michael Grais; Mark Victor
- Produced by: Frank Mancuso Jr.
- Starring: Kim Basinger; Gabriel Byrne; Brad Pitt
- Cinematography: John A. Alonzo
- Edited by: Steve Mirkovich; Annamaria Szanto
- Music by: Mark Isham
- Production company: Bakshi Animation
- Distributed by: Paramount Pictures
- Release date: July 10, 1992
- Running time: 102 minutes
- Country: United States
- Language: English
- Budget: $28 million
- Box office: $14.1 million

Cool World is a 1992 American live-action animated fantasy film directed by Ralph Bakshi and written by Michael Grais and Mark Victor. The film stars Kim Basinger, Gabriel Byrne and Brad Pitt. Its plot follows cartoonist Jack Deebs who finds himself in a cartoon-based universe he believes he created, where he is seduced by one of the characters, femme fatale Holli Would, who wants to become real.

Following the success of Who Framed Roger Rabbit (1988) and his own professional resurgence in television in the late 1980s, Bakshi conceived Cool World as a horror film. He brought the idea to Paramount Pictures, and became attached to direct; it was his first feature film in nearly a decade, and intended as his comeback. However, interference from producer Frank Mancuso Jr. led to an extensive rewrite from Michael Grais, Mark Victor and an uncredited Larry Gross. As a result, relations between Bakshi, Mancuso and the studio deteriorated and the film had a highly tumultuous production.

Cool World was released in the United States by Paramount Pictures on July 10, 1992. The film received largely negative reviews from critics, and was a box-office failure, grossing $14.1 million against a production budget of $28 million.

== Plot ==
In 1945, Frank Harris, a World War II veteran, returns to Las Vegas and invites his mother for a ride on his motorcycle. Tragically, they are involved in a traffic collision that results in his mother's death. Following this incident, Frank is inadvertently transported to a cartoon-based alternate universe called "Cool World," where he takes on the role of a detective for the local police department.

Forty-seven years later, underground cartoonist Jack Deebs is released after serving a ten-year prison sentence for murdering his wife's lover. During his time in prison, he created a series of comics called Cool World, inspired by recurring visions featuring the sultry femme fatale, Holli Would. Holli desires to escape Cool World and become a real human being. This transformation is possible when "doodles" (the inhabitants of Cool World) have sexual intercourse with "noids" (slang for humans). However, Frank and his doodle partner, Nails, keep a vigilant watch over Holli to ensure that the two dimensions do not intertwine.

Shortly after his release, Jack is also transported into Cool World and smuggled into a local nightclub by Holli and her henchmen, the Goons. Frank aggressively confronts Jack, explaining that Cool World had existed long before he created his series. He also warns him that writing implements, such as his fountain pen, are lethal to the doodles and to abstain from having sex with Holli, as her transforming into a noid can be risky for both dimensions. Despite these warnings, however, Frank himself is in love with another doodle, Lonette, but limits himself to platonic advances towards her.

Eventually however, Jack succumbs to Holli's advances, and she proceeds to seduce and make love to him, transforming her into a noid. She then steals Jack's pen to entrap Nails and leaves with Jack for the real world.

In the real world, Holli is excited and overwhelmed, experiencing real sensations. Due to her presence there, she and Jack spontaneously flicker in between noid and doodle forms. While contemplating their situation, Holli tells Jack about the "Spike of Power", an artifact which was the cause of Frank being transported into Cool World and placed on top of the Union Plaza Hotel by a doodle who crossed into the real world and admits she wants to use it to remain in her noid form permanently. When Jack displays skepticism about the idea, Holli abandons him to search for the Spike on her own.

Frank learns what has happened and returns to the real world, where he reluctantly teams up with Jack to stop Holli. They arrive at the hotel as Holli begins to climb to the top of the tower. In Frank's pursuit, Holli pushes him off the building to his death. As she seizes the Spike, she releases a multitude of monstrous doodles into the real world, affecting its surroundings and transforming Jack into a superhero-based doodle.

Although enticed to begin a new life in the real world with Holli, Jack returns the Spike to its rightful place, sending him, Holli and the invading doodles back from whence the creatures came and restoring the balance between their dimensions. The now-freed Nails brings Frank's body back to Cool World, where he and Lonette mourn his loss.

However, as she learns from Nails that Holli was briefly in her doodle form when she murdered Frank, she explains that a noid murdered by a doodle in the real world can be reborn as a doodle in Cool World. Frank is revived as such, allowing him to continue his relationship with Lonette in earnest. Meanwhile, Jack begins to plan his future with Holli, to her dismay.

== Cast ==
- Gabriel Byrne as Jack Deebs, an ex-convict cartoonist who is seemingly responsible for the creation of Cool World.
- Brad Pitt as Frank Harris, a World War II veteran-turned-detective for Cool World's police department who is intent on stopping Holli.
  - Pitt additionally provided the voice of the character's doodle form in the film's epilogue.
- Kim Basinger as Holli Would, a charismatic doodle femme fatale who wishes to become a noid and live in the real world.
  - Basinger additionally provided the voice of the character's doodle form.
- Deirdre O'Connell as Isabelle Malley, a neighbor of Jack.
- Michele Abrams as Jennifer Malley, Isabelle's daughter.
- Janni Brenn-Lowen as Agatha Rose Harris, Frank's late mother.
- Frank Sinatra Jr. as himself

=== Voices ===
- Charlie Adler as Nails, a spider-based doodle who is Frank's partner.
- Candi Milo as:
  - Lonette, Frank's doodle love interest.
  - Bob, a doodle cross-dresser who is one of Holli's "Goons".
- Maurice LaMarche as:
  - Doctor Vincent "Vegas Vinnie" Whiskers, a kind, wise and eccentric doodle scientist who inadvertently transported Frank to Cool World through his usage of the Spike of Power.
  - Mash, a hulking and bestial doodle who is one of Holli's "Goons".
  - Jack in his doodle form (credited as "Super Jack")
  - A drunk patron at Cool World's local nightclub called the Slash Club (credited as "Drunk Bar Patron")
  - One of the two doodle interrogators Frank encounters when he first enters Cool World (credited as "Interrogator No. 2")
- Joey Camen as:
  - Slash, a diminutive and primate-like doodle clad in a diaper-like undergarment and armed with retractable and nail-like claws on his fingers who is one of Holli's "Goons".
  - The sentient door of Holli's apartment building (credited as "Holli's Door")
  - One of the two doodle interrogators Frank encounters when he first enters Cool World (credited as "Interrogator No. 1")
- Michael Lally as Sparks, a doodle gangster armed with sentient and carnivorous wooden nickels who is an informant for Cool World's police department.
- Gregory Snegoff as Bash, a lanky and hyperactive doodle who is one of Holli's "Goons".
- Patrick Pinney as Chico, a legless doodle employed as the Slash Club's bouncer who literally bounces.
- Jenine Jennings as a rabbit-based doodle who plays craps with the Goons (credited as "Craps Bunny")

== Production ==
Storyboard by Louise Zingarelli based on Bakshi's original screenplay

=== Development ===
Following a career resurgence with Mighty Mouse: The New Adventures in the late 1980s, in 1990, Ralph Bakshi concepted a new film project involving a cartoonist who created a comic book while in prison that makes him an underground "star". The cartoonist would go on to have sexual intercourse with a femme fatale "doodle" named Debbie Dallas (a play on the title of the pornographic film, Debbie Does Dallas) and father a hybrid child with her; half-cartoon, and half-human. The child, growing up resenting its father for abandoning it, would grow up and go on to make a pilgrimage to the real world to try to hunt down its father and kill him. Ralph pitched the idea as a live-action animated horror film to Paramount Pictures, where he had served as the final head of the studio's animation division some years earlier. Bakshi stated that Paramount Pictures "bought the idea in ten seconds." In addition to Bakshi himself writing his own screenplay going off of his concept, Michael Grais and Mark Victor, along with an uncredited Larry Gross, wrote several drafts of the screenplay based on Bakshi's original concept. Grais has accused Bakshi of lying about his contribution, noting he and Victor won repeated arbitrations regarding their credits.

Producer Frank Mancuso Jr. – son of Paramount president Frank Mancuso Sr. – became attached as producer, leading Paramount to greenlight the film in November 1990. A long-running rumor attached to the film is that when Bakshi discovered that his original concept had been re-written behind his back without his knowledge or permission, he got into a physical altercation with Frank Mancuso Jr. that involved him punching the producer in the mouth. However, in a 2022 phone interview with Kevin E. G. Perry of The Independent, Bakshi put that rumor to rest, saying, "I never punched Frank Mancuso Jr. [...] That was just a rumour. I yelled at him a couple of times, but that wasn't his fault. I like Frank. I never punched him. Can you set that straight?"

=== Casting and production ===
Bakshi had originally intended to cast Brad Pitt and Drew Barrymore in the film's leading roles Jack Deebs and Holli Would. Instead, the studio insisted on casting bigger box office draws, leading to Kim Basinger and Gabriel Byrne being cast in late January 1991. The role of Frank Harris was created for Pitt. Principal photography lasted from March 15 to April 19, 1991, with scenes being filmed both in Las Vegas and at soundstages at Paramount in Los Angeles.

The relationship between Bakshi and Paramount quickly deteriorated during production. Mancuso convinced Paramount that the film's potential R rating from the MPAA in the United States, which would restrict attendance from anyone under 17 without a parent or guardian, would be too risky. So Mancuso hired Larry Gross to revise the screenplay to target a more general PG-13 MPAA rating, and presented it on the first day of production. Bakshi stated he felt "backstabbed" by Mancuso. Bakshi also claimed Basinger had approached him and Mancuso during production to rewrite the film herself because she "thought it would be great [...] if she would be able to show this picture in hospitals to sick children [...] I said, 'Kim, I think that's wonderful, but you've got the wrong guy to do that with.'"

=== Animation style ===
Bakshi's animation was done on the Paramount lot. The film's animators were never given a screenplay, ultimately being told by Bakshi to "do a scene that's funny, whatever you want to do!"

The visual design of the live-action footage was intended to look like "a living, walk-through painting", a visual concept Bakshi had long wanted to achieve. The film's sets were based upon enlargements of designer Barry Jackson's paintings. The animation was strongly influenced by Fleischer Studios (whose cartoons were released by Paramount in the 1930s and 1940s) and Terrytoons (where Bakshi once worked and whose Mighty Mouse character was also adapted into a series by Bakshi). The artwork by the character Jack Deebs was drawn by underground comix artist Spain Rodriguez.

== Soundtrack ==
A soundtrack album, Songs from the Cool World, featuring recordings by My Life with the Thrill Kill Kult, Moby, Ministry, The Future Sound of London and others, was released in 1992 by Warner Bros. Records. It included the track "Real Cool World" by David Bowie, his first original solo material in roughly three years; the song was written exclusively for the film. The soundtrack received stronger reviews from critics than the film itself, including a four-star rating from AllMusic. Mark Isham's original score for Cool World, featuring a mixture of jazz, orchestral pieces, and electronic remixes, and performed by the Munich Symphony Orchestra, was released on compact disc by Varèse Sarabande, and in complete form in 2015 by Quartet. It also received positive reviews.

== Promotion ==
Paramount focused the film's promotion both on being as Bakshi's comeback, and the hypersexual imagery of Holli Would. It was considered by some pundits as misaimed. Paramount's marketing president Barry London noted the film "unfortunately did not seem to satisfy the younger audience it was aimed at". Designer Milton Knight recalled that premiere audiences "actually wanted a wilder, raunchier Cool World".

Several different licensed video games based on the film were created by Ocean Software. The first game was developed by Twilight and released in 1992 for the Amiga, Atari ST, Commodore 64 and MS-DOS compatible operating systems. An NES game and different Super NES game were both published in 1993 alongside a Game Boy version of the former. A four-issue comic book prequel to the film was published as a miniseries by DC Comics. It featured a script by Michael Eury and art work by Stephen DeStefano, Chuck Fiala and Bill Wray.

=== Controversy ===
In July 1992, Paramount's marketing campaign of the film created controversy by altering the Hollywood Sign to include a 75-foot (23 m) tall cutout of Holli Would. The studio's request was initially denied by the City of Los Angeles; this was reversed once Paramount gave $27,000 to the city, and an additional $27,000 for cleanup after the 1992 Los Angeles riots. Local residents were angered by the sign's alteration, largely due to the sexualized image of Holli; they launched a failed lawsuit against the city to stop the alteration. In a letter to the city's Recreation and Park Board, commission officials wrote that they were "appalled" by the board's approval of the alterations: "... the action your board has taken is offensive to Los Angeles women and is not within your role as custodian and guardian of the Hollywood sign. The fact that Paramount Pictures donated a mere $27,000 to Rebuild L.A. should not be a passport to exploit women in Los Angeles." Protestors picketed the unveiling of the altered sign.

== Reception ==
=== Box office ===
Cool World opened sixth at the North American box office, with $5.5 million. Although set to expand to more theaters in its second weekend, Paramount stunned exhibitors by immediately ceasing advertising for the film. Its lifetime gross was US$14.1 million, barely more than half its reported US$28 million budget.

=== Critical response ===
A still image of Jack Deebs (Gabriel Byrne) with Holli Would (Kim Basinger). Reviews were critical of the compositing of animation and live-action.

On Rotten Tomatoes, the film has an approval rating of 4% based on 51 reviews, with an average rating of 3.4/10. The consensus reads: "Cool World throws a small handful of visual sparks, but they aren't enough to distract from the screenplay's thin characters and scattered plot." On Metacritic, the film has a score of 28 based on reviews from 16 critics, indicating "generally unfavorable" reviews. Audiences surveyed by CinemaScore gave the film a grade of "C" on scale of A+ to F.

Variety reviewer Brian Lowry compared the film to an extended music video, praising the soundtrack and visuals, but panning the story. The plot was heavily derided by other reviewers, with a review for the Los Angeles Times saying "[T]he plot makes almost no sense."

Roger Ebert of the Chicago Sun-Times gave Cool World one star out of four. He said film's fast editing style was nearly incomprehensible, the animation was poorly integrated with live action, and the story failed to live up to an interesting premise: "[Cool World is] a surprisingly incompetent film." Leonard Maltin panned the film as "too serious to be fun, too goofy to take seriously; lead characters unlikable and unappealing. Looks like a Roger Corman version of Roger Rabbit." Chris Hicks for Deseret News described it as "a one-joke movie – and it's a dirty joke. [...] And much of what's going on here seems more angry and nasty than inspired or funny." The film's acting and effects were singled out by The Washington Post reviewer Hal Hinson, who wrote her performance made him wonder "whether Kim Basinger is more obnoxious as a cartoon or as a real person", and felt that the combination of animation and live action was unconvincing.

In 1997, John Grant wrote in The Encyclopedia of Fantasy that Cool World "stands as one of the fantastic cinema's most significant achievements, an 'Instauration fantasy' that reveals greater depths with each viewing." In 2005, animation historian Jerry Beck described the film as being "for adults and Bakshi completists only". He wrote the film "has a great premise, a great cast, and the best animation he's ever been involved with", but critiquing it as a "pointless rehash of many of Ralph's favorite themes, and the story literally goes nowhere".

In some interviews after the release of the film, Bakshi denounced the film. He noted: "I thought if I did the animation well, it would be worth it, but you know what? It wasn't worth it." Bakshi also stated that he "had a lot of animators there that I'd brought in and I thought that maybe I could just have fun animating this stuff, which I did." In 2022, he stated "I used to disparage it, but not anymore" and that "Cool World has some of the best animation I've ever done."

The film garnered a Kim Basinger a nomination for the Golden Raspberry Award for Worst Actress, also for her performance in Final Analysis, at the 13th Golden Raspberry Awards.

== Home media ==
Cool World was released on VHS on February 24, 1993, by Paramount Home Video. Shout! Factory released a Blu-ray collector's edition in the United States and Canada, sourced from a 4K scan of the original camera negative on September 13, 2022.

== See also ==
- List of adult animated films
- List of films set in Las Vegas
