= Crime boss =

Person in charge of a criminal organization

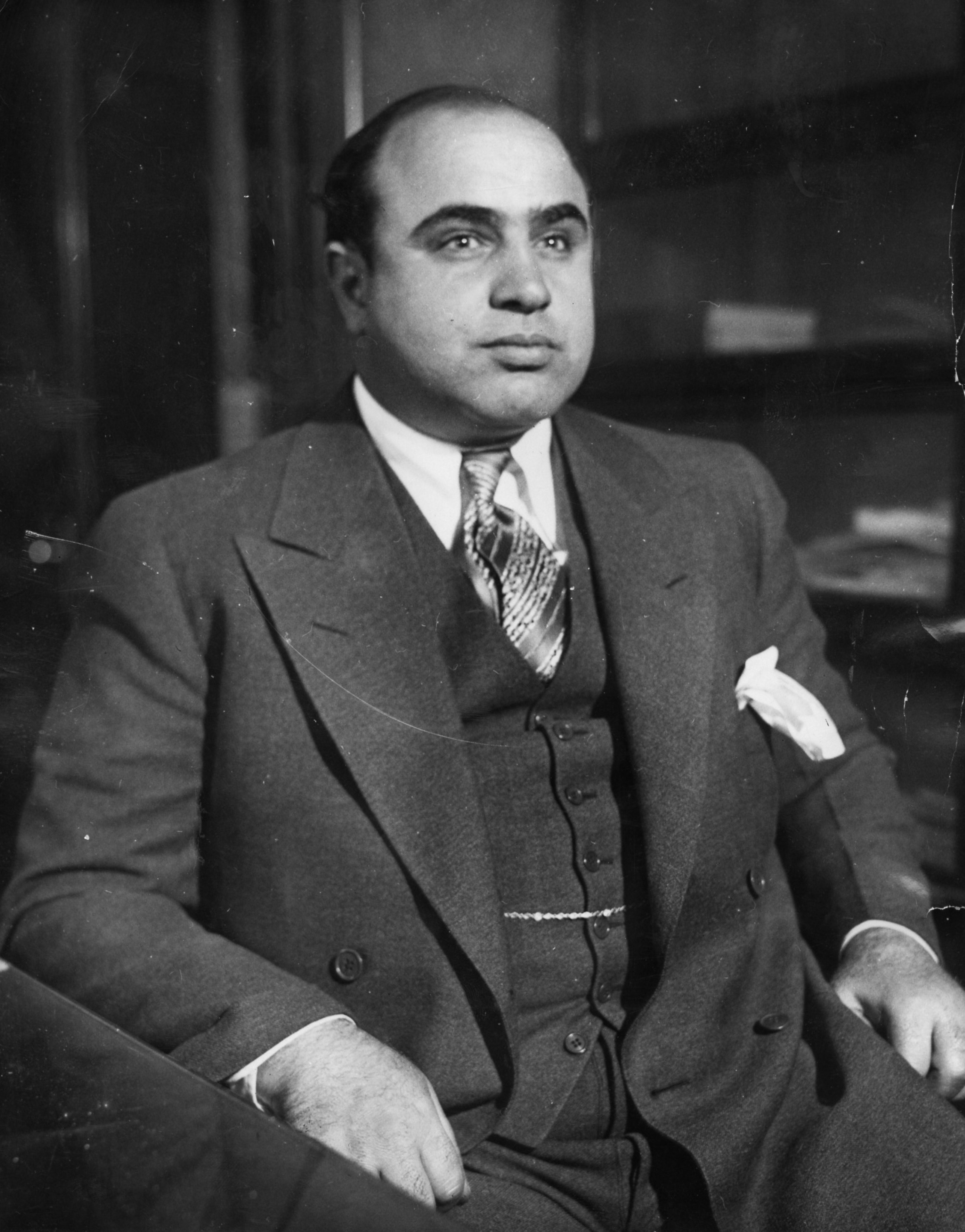
Al Capone, a crime boss during the Prohibition era

A crime boss, also known as a crime lord, Don, mob boss, kingpin, or godfather, is the leader of a criminal organization.

== Description ==
A crime boss has absolute or nearly absolute control over the other members of the organization and is often greatly feared or respected for being willing to use criminal means to exert their influence and gain profits from the criminal endeavors in which the organization engages.

Some groups may only have as little as two ranks (a crime boss and their soldiers). Other groups have a more complex, structured organization with many ranks, and structure may vary with cultural background. Organized crime enterprises originating in Sicily differ in structure from those in mainland Italy. American groups may be structured differently from their European counterparts and Latino and African American gangs often have structures that vary from European gangs. The size of the criminal organization is also important, as regional or national gangs have much more complex hierarchies.

== Sicilian Mafia ==
Structure of a mafia crime family

The boss in the Sicilian and Italian-American Mafia is the head of the crime family and the top decision maker. Only the boss can initiate an associate into the family, however, the boss can give permission to an underboss, consigliere or a captain, allowing them to become a made man. The boss can promote or demote family members at will, and has the sole power to sanction murders inside and outside the family. If the boss is incarcerated or incapacitated, they usually retain the title of "boss" but may appoint an acting boss who is responsible for running the crime family in his stead or on a more daily basis. In addition to "boss" and "acting boss", some families have at times officially or unofficially utilized the positions of front boss and street boss. A "front boss" is generally put into place to act ostensibly as the boss while drawing police attention away from the actual official boss operating behind the scenes. A "street boss" is often informally appointed or regarded by the official boss or by subordinates as the "hands-on", street-level, actively engaged proxy or stand-in for the official boss, usually coordinating, controlling, and managing street operations on behalf of an official boss who prefers to stay behind the scenes (either by choice or to avoid police scrutiny). "Street bosses" are often particularly influential or powerful caporegimes or underbosses, and the term is sometimes used interchangeably with "acting boss" or "front boss" depending on the circumstances. When a boss dies, the crime family members choose a new boss from inside the organization.

The typical structure within the Mafia in Sicily and America is usually as follows:

- Boss of all bosses – also known as the capo dei capi or godfather (Italian: padrino), was once the top position of a mafiosi who led all of the other crime organizations until Salvatore Maranzano was assassinated, and the title has never been used officially since. It is used by the media and popular press to denote the most powerful boss. The highest body to decide on inter-family issues is the Commission (see also Sicilian Mafia Commission).
- Boss – Also known as the capomandamento, capocrimine, rappresentante, don, or godfather, is the highest level in a crime family.
- Underboss – Also known as the "capo bastone" in some criminal organizations, this individual is the second-in-command. They are responsible for ensuring that profits from criminal enterprises flow up to the boss, and generally oversees the selection of the caporegime(s) and soldier(s) to carry out murders, kidnappings, carjackings, robberies, terrorisms, etc. The underboss may take control of the crime family after the boss' death.They keep this position until a new boss is chosen, which in some cases may be the underboss.
- Consigliere – Also known as an advisor or "right-hand man", this person is a counselor to the boss of a crime family. The boss, underboss, and consigliere constitute the "Administration". The consigliere is third ranked in the hierarchy but generally does not have capos or soldiers working directly for them. Like the boss, there is usually only one consigliere per criminal organization.
- Caporegime – Also known as a captain, skipper, capo, or "crew chief", the caporegime was originally known as a "capodecina" (captain of ten) because they oversaw only 10 soldiers. In more recent times, the caporegime may oversee as many soldiers as they can efficiently control. A caporegime is appointed by the family boss to run their own borgata (regime, or crew) of soldati (soldiers). Each caporegime reports directly to the underboss, who gives them the permission to perform criminal activities. If the family decides to murder someone, the underboss normally asks a caporegime to carry out the order. The caporegime runs the day-to-day operations of his crew. The caporegime's soldiers give part of their earnings to them, and then they give a share to the underboss. A caporegime can recommend to the underboss or boss that a recruit be allowed to join his crew as a mob associate.
- Soldato – Also known as a sgarrista, soldier, "button man", "made man", "wiseguy" or "goodfella", this is the lowest level of mobster or gangster. A "soldier" must have taken the omertà (oath of silence), and in some organizations must have killed a person to be considered "made". A picciotto is a low-level soldier, usually someone who does the day-to-day work of threatening, beating, planting bombs, and intimidating others.
- Associate – Also known as a "giovane d'onore" (man of honor), an associate is a person who is not a soldier in a crime family, but works for them and shares in the execution of and profits from the criminal enterprise. In Italian criminal organizations, "associates" are usually affiliates of the criminal organization who are not of Italian descent, or affiliates and candidates of Italian descent who have not yet been "made" or inducted into the Mafia and thus have not yet been promoted to the position of "soldato" or "soldier".

A boss will typically put up layers of insulation between himself and the family's operations. Whenever he issues orders, he does so either to his underboss, consigliere or capos. The orders are then passed down the line to the soldiers. This makes it difficult under most circumstances for law enforcement to directly implicate a boss in a crime, since he almost never directly gives orders to the soldiers.

== See also ==
- American Mafia
- Drug lord – bosses of drug cartels
- List of crime bosses
- List of criminal enterprises, gangs and syndicates
- List of fictional crime bosses and gang leaders
