= Cool World (1992 video game) =

- Commodore 64 cover art
- Developer(s): Twilight
- Publisher(s): Ocean
- Composer(s): Mark Cooksey
- Platform(s): Amiga, Atari ST, Commodore 64, Game Boy, MS-DOS
- Release: 1992; Game Boy: NA: June 1993; EU: 1993
- Genre(s): Platform
- Mode(s): Single-player

Cool World is a 2D platform game released by Ocean Software in 1992 for the Commodore 64, Amiga, Atari ST, and MS-DOS. It was the first game based on the film of the same name. A version of the game for the Game Boy was released in 1993 alongside two entirely different games based on the film for the NES and SNES.

== Gameplay ==
Detective Frank Harris has to prevent "Doodles" from reaching the transporter gates to the "Real World".

Players control Frank Harris, chief of the Cool World police department. He must prevent the Doodles (evil cartoons) from stealing items from the real world and sending them to various locations in the cartoonish Cool World. Any items that have already been sent to Cool World must be returned to the real world. If too many Doodles are in the real world or too many items from the real world have been sent to Cool World, a "danger meter" increases, indicating an imbalance between the real world and the Cool World. Players must keep a balance in each level for five minutes. Otherwise, Frank's associate Nails the Spider informs the player that "he blew it".

Doodles can be defeated by being turned into ink blots using Frank's pen. The player must collect coins that defeated doodles leave behind to pay for access to the game's various locations.
