= Cool World (NES video game) =

1993 video game

- Cover art
- Developer: Ocean
- Publisher: Ocean
- Composer: Keith Tinman
- Platform: NES
- Release: NA: June 1993
- Genre: Action
- Mode: Single-player

Cool World is a 1993 action game for the Nintendo Entertainment System that is loosely based on the movie Cool World. Different games based on the film were also released for the SNES and various personal computers.

== Gameplay ==
The player must face off against various doodles in Cool World.

The player controls Detective Frank Harris, who must retrieve five pieces of a tunnel map bridging the real world with a cartoonish dimension known as Cool World, which is populated by cartoons known as doodles. Along the way, he must face off against the henchmen of Holli Would, a cartoon woman who seeks the Spike of Power, an artifact keeping the real world and Cool World in balance. Frank must also contend with members of the Popper Police (who were actually his allies in the film) and their police cruiser.

As Detective Harris, the player must navigate through four different levels and stop Holli Would while collecting coins and shooting at rogue doodles. These levels include the streets of Cool World, the road that separates Cool World from the place where the playful characters of Sweet Place live, the town of Sweet Place and its surrounding countryside. While four of them can be selected, a fifth one can only be unlocked by properly finishing all four levels.

Each level holds an important piece of a map that makes it possible for Detective Harris to travel to the Real World and back.

== Reception ==
Allgame gave Cool World an overall score of 2 stars out of an overall 5.

== See also ==
- Who Framed Roger Rabbit
