= Cool World (SNES video game) =

1992 video game

- North American cover art
- Developer(s): Painting by Numbers
- Publisher(s): Ocean
- Designer(s): Chris Kerry
- Artist(s): John Beard; Steven Kerry; Alan Pashley
- Composer(s): Dean Evans; Keith Tinman
- Platform(s): Super NES
- Release: EU: 1992; NA: February 1993
- Genre(s): Action
- Mode(s): Single-player

Cool World is an action video game developed by British studio Painting By Numbers. It was released by Ocean Software in 1993 for the Super Nintendo Entertainment System. It is loosely based on the 1992 movie of the same name. Both the European and North American versions are in English.

In contrast to the computer/Game Boy and NES versions, this version of the game plays more like an adventure game. It is the only version of the game that allows players to control Jack Deebs, who must avoid the advances of Holli Would and return home.

Cool World was first mentioned in issue #47 (April 1993) of the North American video gaming magazine Nintendo Power.

== Gameplay ==
Players must avoid The Popper Police or risk being arrested.

The player controls Jack, who must avoid being surrounded by the Popper Police, a cartoon police force, or get arrested. Depending on how many times the player has broken the law and whether he has collected the in-game currency of nickels or not, the player will either get a lecture by Detective Frank Harris and/or be forced to pay bail money. Ten coins is the usual bail required by Detective Harris. Players can visit Las Vegas to increase their nickel stash and store their coins at the Cool World bank.

Other in-game locales include a pawn shop that allows items to be traded or bought with nickels in addition to the Slash Club where the player arranges a date with Holli Would. At Holli's apartment building, the player must navigate its exterior in order to reach the date with Holli. If the player did not arrange a date with Holli before reaching the top, Jack is tossed back to the ground level. In the malt shop, candy can be found in addition to other sweets. However, entry is restricted to players who have collected several pieces of candy.

== Reception ==
Allgame gave Cool World an overall rating of 2 stars out of an overall 5. Nintendo Power gave this game a rating of 3.25 out of 5. Power Unlimited gave this game a 75% rating in their July 1993 issue and concluded that: "The game around the movie is just as wacky, strange, and actually not really good either. What exactly you have to do is unclear, but it looks nice and it all sounds very funny."
