= A Sound of Thunder (video game) =

2004 video game

- North American box art
- Developer: Möbius Entertainment
- Publisher: BAM! Entertainment
- Platform: Game Boy Advance
- Release: EU: February 28, 2004; NA: February 1, 2005
- Genre: Action-adventure
- Modes: Single-player, multiplayer

A Sound of Thunder is a 2004 video game developed by Möbius Entertainment and published by BAM! Entertainment for the Game Boy Advance. It was released in Europe on February 28, 2004, before arriving in North America on February 1, 2005. The story is loosely based on Ray Bradbury's 1952 short story of the same name, but follows more closely the plot of the 2005 film adaptation.

Versions for the Microsoft Xbox, GameCube and PlayStation 2, were cancelled as of December 2006. Gameplay of the console game was shown in the TV show CSI.

== Plot ==
The game mostly follows the plot of the film and retains some of the characters. Travis Ryer is a guide and biologist for Time Safari Inc. (TSI), a company which provides time-travel hunting safaris for the rich. After a time tourist alters the course of events in the late Cretaceous, the future begins to change as "time waves" bring further consequences due to the butterfly's absence from the course of history. Dinosaur-like creatures soon run rampant, and the world becomes progressively overgrown with tropical vegetation.

Travis learns from Dr. Sonia Rand, inventor of the time machine, that a butterfly was brought back from the past on the last safari. He tries going back to reset the timeline, but is turned back by a "cleanup crew" from TSI. The crew disappears, however, due to the changes in history. Ryer gets in contact with one of the tourists, Ted Eckles (spelled Eckels in the film), who informs him it was his friend Christian Middleton who was responsible. On the way to Middleton's place, Eckles is killed as a time wave arrives. Middleton is discovered dead, but Ryer manages to retrieve the butterfly, get back to TSI and enter the time machine. Right afterwards, a time wave arrives and gets rid of the vegetation and animals, implying the timeline was set right.

== Gameplay ==
The game is an overhead shooter, played from an isometric perspective. The objective is to complete each mission by killing mutants, solving push-the-crate puzzles and completing the occasional driving stage until the end of the level is reached. Along the way, the player can earn points for collecting items, killing enemies, completing the level within a certain time and exploring all the rooms. The player can resume progress via a six-letter password-based save, which does not, however, retain the player's scores.

The game provides an array of collectible weapons, which automatically lock onto enemies. One of them, the Time Freeze Disruptor, can slow down the player's surroundings while allowing the player to move at regular speed (similar to bullet time). Most weapons rely on collectible ammo, but the electric prod only needs to be charged by holding down the fire button before use. The game can be played alone or in co-op via Link Cable. The Link Cable also allows for a single-cartridge deathmatch with up to four players in a special arena.

== Reception ==
Reception

Aggregate scores
| Aggregator | Score |
|---|---|
| GameRankings | 67.29% |
| Metacritic | 65/100 |

Review scores
| Publication | Score |
|---|---|
| Game Informer | 4.5/10 |
| GamePro | 3.5/5 |
| IGN | 7.5/10 |
| Nintendo Power | 3.1/5 |

The game was better received than the film on which it was based, which was a critical and commercial failure. The game received criticism for its password-based save system and praise for its single-cart multiplayer mode.

Game Informer's Jeremy Zoss criticized the game for its bland graphics and difficult controls for its vehicle sections.
