= Kakihara =

Kakihara (written: 垣原 or 柿原) is a Japanese surname. Notable people with the surname include:

- Isao Kakihara (垣原 功; born 1944), Japanese ice hockey player
- Masahito Kakihara (垣原 賢人; born 1972), Japanese wrestler
- Takashi Kakihara (垣原 隆司; born 1937), Japanese ice hockey player
- Tetsuya Kakihara (柿原 徹也; born 1982), Japanese voice actor and singer

== Fictional characters ==
- Masao Kakihara, a character in the manga series Ichi the Killer
