= A Sound of Thunder (film) =

2005 film by Peter Hyams

- Theatrical release poster
- Directed by: Peter Hyams
- Screenplay by: Thomas Dean Donnelly Joshua Oppenheimer; Gregory Poirier
- Story by: Thomas Dean Donnelly; Joshua Oppenheimer
- Based on: "A Sound of Thunder" by Ray Bradbury
- Produced by: Moshe Diamant; Howard Baldwin; Karen Baldwin
- Starring: Edward Burns; Catherine McCormack; Ben Kingsley; Jemima Rooper; David Oyelowo
- Cinematography: Peter Hyams
- Edited by: Sylvie Landra
- Music by: Nick Glennie-Smith
- Production companies: Franchise Pictures; Crusader Entertainment; Baldwin Entertainment Group; Apollo Media; Dante Entertainment; Etic Films; Forge; QI Quality International
- Distributed by: Warner Bros. Pictures (United States); Bioscop (Czech Republic)
- Release date: September 2, 2005 (United States)
- Running time: 101 minutes
- Countries: Czech Republic; Germany; United Kingdom; United States
- Languages: English; Mandarin
- Budget: $80 million
- Box office: $11.7 million

A Sound of Thunder is a 2005 science fiction thriller film shot and directed by Peter Hyams. It is based on the 1952 short story of the same name by Ray Bradbury. The film stars Edward Burns, Catherine McCormack, and Ben Kingsley. It follows "time tourists" who accidentally interfere too much with the past, completely altering the present.

A Sound of Thunder was released in the United States on September 2, 2005, by Warner Bros. Pictures. The film failed at the box office, earning only $11.8 million against a production budget of $80 million, and was largely panned by critics, who criticized its cheap special effects, uninvolved performances, scientific errors and choppy logic, and the lack of faithfulness to the source material.

== Plot ==
In the year 2055, the Chicago-based Time Safari company offers the opportunity for rich people to hunt dinosaurs in the past via time travel technology. As a precaution against the potential change of the past, the company preys only on the dinosaurs who would otherwise die of natural causes and keeps the clients from stepping off the designated path. Because of the dangers of interfering with the timeline, the company's activities are vocally criticized by Sonia Rand, the developer of the time machine software "TAMI", who feels disappointed for not receiving credit during her work and is worried that some clients may alter the past through their activities.

A trip with clients Eckels and Middleton goes afoul when the gun brought by team leader Travis Ryer fails to go off. The dinosaur, a female Allosaurus, runs towards the group, scattering the clients. Ryer is able to kill the dinosaur and afterwards, regroups the clients and returns to 2055 without further harm. The next day, however, members of Time Safari including CEO Charles Hatton hear reports of global increases in temperature and humidity, and Ryer observes a sudden increase in plant life. On their next trip, Ryer and a new group of clients find that the Allosaurus he and the team intend to hunt is already dead and the volcano erupts much sooner. The team quickly returns and reports the changes, causing the government to shut down Time Safari for an investigation. Ryer learns from Rand that Chicago is being struck by "time waves" that cause drastic alterations to the city as they pass due to something that happened on a previous expedition. Ryer and Rand narrowly escape a building after a time wave causes the appearance of thousands of beetles and a tree bursting through its structure. Rand warns that more time waves can be expected, and each will affect more advanced life forms, humans being the last.

Ryer and Rand return to Time Safari to try to fix what has gone wrong along with the government. Unfortunately, another time wave strikes that leaves the city without power and now covered by dense vegetation. Evaluating the machine's logs, they find that the Eckels/Middleton expedition had come back a few grams heavier and that the bio-filter was turned off and recognize that they can use the time machine to go back to intercept their past selves so as to prevent whatever happened, but will only have a few seconds to act, and so must work to figure out who they need to stop. The Time Safari finds their equipment and gear free of anything, so Ryer and Rand lead a group through the city - now filled with evolved and deadly hybrids and other new hazards that kill some of their party members in order to find Eckels and Middleton. Eckels is safe but asserts he remained on the path, while Middleton, poisoned by the new wildlife, dies by suicide before they can stop him. Afterwards, they are able to find a dead butterfly on the sole of the shoe he used for the safari. The party makes it back to Time Safari after more time waves hit, now finding the time machine partially underwater and unusable. Rand obtains the hard drive containing the TAMI software with plans to use it with the nearby university's particle accelerator as a substitute time machine.

With Ryer and Rand as the only two survivors, they finally make it to the university. Rand notes that the appearance of simian-like Babboonlizards from the latest time wave means the next one will wipe away humanity. Rand prepares the accelerator and stays behind while Ryer goes through the time portal, just as the last time wave hits turning Rand into a humanoid catfish-like creature. Ryer catches up to the previous expedition, tells team member Jenny that the bio-filter is off at the same time asking her to give his earlier self a recording of the events he has witnessed, he then catches Middleton to prevent him from stepping on the butterfly before vanishing. The expedition returns without incident to the future they had left and Ryer shares the footage with Rand, presumably to use it to bring down Time Safari, and make sure nothing like this ever happens again.

== Cast ==
- Catherine McCormack as Sonia Rand
- Edward Burns as Travis Ryer
- David Oyelowo as Marcus Payne
- Ben Kingsley as Charles Hatton
- Jemima Rooper as Jenny Krase
- Wilfried Hochholdinger as Dr. Lucas
- August Zirner as Clay Derris
- Corey Johnson as Christian Middleton
- Heike Makatsch as Alicia Wallenbeck
- Armin Rohde as John Wallenbeck
- William Armstrong as Ted Eckels

== Production ==
The film was originally going to be directed by Renny Harlin, star Pierce Brosnan in the main role, and be shot in Montreal, Canada. The budget was meant to be $55 million.

Filming was to have begun in Montreal on 16 April 2001. Brosnan wanted a rewrite of the script. However, the filmmakers did not have time to rewrite and finish the film by July 1, which is when Hollywood writers and actors were poised to go on strike. Matters were complicated when Canadian producer Nicolas Claremont died in April 2001.

By November 2001 Harlin had been replaced by Peter Hyams. Brosnan left the project as well and was replaced by Edward Burns.

After Franchise Pictures went bankrupt during post-production, the remaining backers provided only $30 million to work with, out of the $80 million originally allocated. Previsualization software was used.

=== Filming ===
Shooting took place in the Czech Republic in 2002. The unit was affected by the August 2002 floods.

Kingsley said "I was allowed to give a very ironic comedic performance. I was able to make my director (Peter Hyams) stifle a huge amount of laughter behind the camera."

Director Peter Hyams said the effects were done "in a mom-and-pop fashion. That's the only way we could make this film for a reasonable amount of money. We had stuff done in Germany, Hong Kong, India. We've also taken a long time to get it all completed. The post-production on this film will be over two years by the time we're finished. I myself will have worked on it for three years."

Hyams' son John later said "it was one of the hardest experiences of his [father's] career. You know, it's got to be a real sinking feeling going into something shooting all of it against green screen with all this trust that you're relying on this whole element, this whole technology that ultimately you're not going to be able to afford and you have to do it anyway."

== Video game ==
A video game based on the film was released for the Game Boy Advance. It had been considerably delayed, and debuted slightly before the film opened, in March 2005. It is an overhead shooter game with driving stages, and support for co-op and death-match multiplayer via link cable. Many people considered the video game to be better than the film it was based on. A game for PlayStation 2 and Xbox was planned in 2003 but was canceled.

== Reception ==
=== Critical response ===
The film was largely panned by both critics and audiences alike. On Rotten Tomatoes, it has a 6% score based on 98 reviews, with an average rating of 2.8/10. The site's consensus states: "Choppy logic and uneven performances are overshadowed by not-so-special effects that makes the suspension of disbelief a nearly impossible task." Common criticisms against the film included its poor special effects, uninvolved performances, scientific errors and Ben Kingsley's hair. Audiences surveyed by CinemaScore gave the film a grade of "D−" on scale of A+ to F.

James Duffy of The Boston Globe stated "The combination of awful special effects and mediocre acting created this catastrophe," and it included the film in its list of "Bomb at the box office". Roger Ebert stated that while he "cannot endorse it, [he] can appreciate it" as a film that is bad because it "want[s] so much to be terrific that [it] explode[s] under the strain."

At the 2005 Stinkers Bad Movie Awards, the film was nominated for Worst Director, Worst Supporting Actor (Kingsley), Most Intrusive Musical Score, and Least "Special" Special Effects, but it won none of those awards.

=== Box office ===
Due to negative reviews and lack of promotion, the production grossed only $1,900,451 in the United States and $9,765,014 elsewhere for a worldwide total of $11,665,465.

== See also ==
- List of films featuring dinosaurs

== Bibliography ==
- Florence, Phil (October 2005). "Rolling Thunder". Starlog. pp. 20–23.
