= Twilight (company) =

British video game developer

- Company type: Private
- Industry: Video games
- Founded: 1 May 1990; 35 years ago
- Founders: Stuart Cook; Mark Mason; Jason McGann; Andy Swann; Peter Tattersall
- Defunct: 1997
- Fate: Dissolved
- Headquarters: Harrogate, England
- Key people: Stuart Cook; Mark Mason

Twilight was a British video game developer based in Harrogate.

== History ==
Twilight was founded by Stuart Cook, Mark Mason, Jason McGann, Andy Swann, and Peter Tattersall. They worked together at Enigma Variations, a studio based in Harrogate, where they mostly created games based on licensed properties in short timespans. In 1989, Mason was fired, leading Cook, McGann, Swann, and Tattersall to leave the company in early 1990. The five founded Twilight on 1 May 1990. While trying to come up with a company name, Tattersall began humming the theme music of The Twilight Zone, leading them to settle on the name "Twilight". He also created the company's logo, taking inspiration from Roger Dean with the aim of making it easily representable on a Commodore 64.

The company rented its first office in a mid-terrace house on Mayfield Grove in Harrogate. Its first game was Delta Charge, a port of Delta from the Commodore 64 to the ZX Spectrum, released by Thalamus Ltd. Throughout 1990, Twilight attracted projects from multiple publishers, including several titles from licensed properties for Hi-Tec Software. Having hired Mark Barker, Wayne Billingham, Dave Box, Noel Hines, Rob Holman, Andy Severn, Martin Severn, and James Smart, the company operated with two development teams, one working for 8-bit platforms while the other began exploring games for 16-bit platforms. Twilight ultimately moved into proper offices within Harrogate.

In 1994, shortly after finishing Alfred Chicken for the Super Nintendo Entertainment System, McGann and Tattersall left Twilight to form Hookstone. Twilight subsequently agreed to transfer the rights to Alfred Chicken, which McGann had conceived, to Hookstone. Swann also left the company around this time. In the following years, Cook and Mason continued to run the company, which saw a significant decline in development projects. Following the cancellation of Frog Dude and a game in the style of Fantasy Quest for Telstar, Twilight struggled with the transition to 3D video games. Cook and Mason paid off and fired all staff, and the company was ultimately shut down in 1997.

== Games ==
- Delta Charge (1990, Thalamus Ltd)
- Ruff & Reddy in the Space Adventure (1990, Hi-Tec Software)
- Atom Ant (1990, Hi-Tec Software)
- Plotting (1990, Ocean Software)
- Yogi Bear & Friends: The Greed Monster (1990, Hi-Tec Software)
- Rod Land (1991, Sales Curve Interactive)
- Quick Draw McGraw (1991, Hi-Tec Software)
- Darkman (1991, Ocean Software)
- WWF WrestleMania (1991, Ocean Software)
- Mega Twins (1992)
- Bonanza Brothers (1992)
- Video Kid (1992, Gremlin Graphics)
- Cool World (1992, Ocean Software)
- Yogi's Treasure Hunt (1993)
- Frog Dude (cancelled)
- Alfred Chicken (1993)
