= List of American films of 1979 =

This is a list of American films released in 1979.

== Box office ==
The highest-grossing American films released in 1979, by domestic box-office gross revenue, are as follows:

Highest-grossing films of 1979
Rank	Title	Distributor	Domestic gross
1	Kramer vs. Kramer	Columbia	$106,260,000
2	The Amityville Horror	American International	$86,432,520
3	Rocky II	United Artists	$85,182,160<
4	Star Trek: The Motion Picture	Paramount	$82,258,456
5	Alien	20th Century Fox	$78,944,891
6	Apocalypse Now	United Artists	$78,784,010
7	10	Warner Bros.	$74,865,517
8	The Jerk	Universal	$73,691,419
9	Moonraker	United Artists	$70,308,099
10	The Muppet Movie	Associated Film	$65,200,000

== January–March ==
Opening		Title	Production company	Cast and crew	Ref.
J A N U A R Y	26	Richard Pryor: Live in Concert	Special Event Entertainment / Elkins Entertainment / SEE Theater Network	Jeff Margolis (director); Richard Pryor (screenplay); Richard Pryor	
J A N U A R Y	29	Love on the Run	AMLF / Gala / Les Films du Carrosse	François Truffaut (director/screenplay); Marie-France Pisier, Jean Aurel, Suzanne Schiffman (screenplay); Jean-Pierre Léaud, Claude Jade, Marie-France Pisier, Dorothée, Dani, Daniel Mesguich, Julien Bertheau, Rosy Varte, Jean-Pierre Ducos, Marie Henriau, Julien Dubois, Pierre Dois, Alain Ollivier, Monique Dury, Emmanuel Clot	
F E B R U A R Y	2	The First Great Train Robbery	United Artists / Dino De Laurentiis Company / Starling Films	Michael Crichton (director/screenplay); Sean Connery, Donald Sutherland, Lesley-Anne Down, Alan Webb, Malcolm Terris, Robert Lang, Michael Elphick, Wayne Sleep, Pamela Salem, Gabrielle Lloyd, George Downing, James Cossins, André Morell, Peter Benson, Janine Duvitski, Peter Butterworth	
F E B R U A R Y	9	Agatha	Warner Bros. / Casablanca FilmWorks / First Artists	Michael Apted (director); Kathleen Tynan, Arthur Hopcraft (screenplay); Dustin Hoffman, Vanessa Redgrave, Timothy Dalton, Helen Morse, Celia Gregory, Paul Brooke, Carolyn Pickles, Timothy West, Tony Britton, Alan Badel, Robert Longden, Donald Nithsdale, Yvonne Gilan, Sandra Voe, Barry Hart, David Hargreaves, Tim Seely, Jill Summers, Chris Fairbank, Liz Smith, Peter Arne	
F E B R U A R Y	9	Hardcore	Columbia Pictures / A-Team Productions	Paul Schrader (director/screenplay); George C. Scott, Peter Boyle, Season Hubley, Dick Sargent, Gary Rand Graham, Larry Block, Marc Alaimo, Leslie Ackerman, Hal Williams, Reb Brown, Leonard Gaines, David Nichols, Charlotte McGinnes, Ilah Davis, Paul Marin, Will Walker, James Helder	
F E B R U A R Y	9	Murder by Decree	AVCO Embassy Pictures	Bob Clark (director); John Hopkins (screenplay): Christopher Plummer, James Mason, David Hemmings, Susan Clark, Anthony Quayle, John Gielgud, Frank Finlay, Donald Sutherland, Geneviève Bujold, Peter Jonfield, Roy Lansford	
F E B R U A R Y	9	The North Avenue Irregulars	Walt Disney Productions / Buena Vista Distribution	Bruce Bilson (director); Don Tait (screenplay); Edward Herrmann, Barbara Harris, Susan Clark, Karen Valentine, Michael Constantine, Cloris Leachman, Steve Franken, Patsy Kelly, Douglas Fowley, Virginia Capers, Ruth Buzzi, Herb Voland, Ivor Francis, Louisa Moritz, Marjorie Bennett, Ceil Cabot, Melora Hardin, Dena Dietrich, Cliff Osmond, Carl Ballantine, Alan Hale Jr., Frank Campanella, Chuck Henry, Jack Perkins, Tom Pedi, Gary Morgan, Don Stanley, Bobby Rolofson, Dick Fuchs, Damon Bradley Daskin, Linda Lee Lyons, David Ketchum, David Rode, Pitt Herbert, Bill McLean	
F E B R U A R Y	9	Quintet	20th Century Fox	Robert Altman (director/screenplay); Frank Barhydt, Patricia Resnick (screenplay); Paul Newman, Vittorio Gassman, Fernando Rey, Bibi Andersson, Brigitte Fossey, Nina van Pallandt, David Langton, Thomas Hill, Monique Mercure, Craig Richard Nelson, Anne Gerety, Maruska Stankova, Michel Maillot, Max Fleck, Françoise Berd	
F E B R U A R Y	9	The Warriors	Paramount Pictures	Walter Hill (director/screenplay); David Shaber (screenplay); Michael Beck, James Remar, Deborah Van Valkenburgh, Marcelino Sánchez, David Harris, Tom McKitterick, Brian Tyler, Dorsey Wright, Terry Michos, David Patrick Kelly, Roger Hill, Edward Sewer, Lynne Thigpen, Thomas G. Waites, Joel Weiss, Paul Greco, Craig R. Baxley, A. J. Bakunas, Steve James, Bill Anagnos, Mercedes Ruehl, Irwin Keyes, Sonny Landham, John Snyder, Jery Hewitt, Kate Klugman, Konrad Sheehan, Dennis Gregory, Ginny Ortiz	
F E B R U A R Y	23	Fast Break	Columbia Pictures / Kings Road Entertainment	Jack Smight (director); Marc Kaplan, Sandor Stern (screenplay); Gabe Kaplan, Harold Sylvester, Bernard King, Randee Heller, Michael Warren, Bert Remsen, Reb Brown, Larry Fishburne, John Chappell, Richard Brestoff, Mavis Washington	
F E B R U A R Y	26	The Passage	Hemdale Film Distribution / Monday Films	J. Lee Thompson (director); Bruce Nicolaysen (screenplay); Anthony Quinn, James Mason, Malcolm McDowell, Patricia Neal, Kay Lenz, Christopher Lee, Michael Lonsdale, Marcel Bozzuffi, Paul Clemens, Peter Arne, Neville Jason, Robert Brown, Jim Broadbent, Robert Rhys	
M A R C H	2	Norma Rae	20th Century Fox	Martin Ritt (director); Irving Ravetch, Harriet Frank Jr. (screenplay); Sally Field, Ron Leibman, Beau Bridges, Pat Hingle, Barbara Baxley, Gail Strickland, Gregory Walcott, Morgan Paull, John Calvin, Noble Willingham, Grace Zabriskie, Robert Broyles	
M A R C H	2	Real Life	Paramount Pictures	Albert Brooks (director/screenplay); Monica Johnson, Harry Shearer (screenplay); Albert Brooks, Charles Grodin, Frances Lee McCain, J. A. Preston, Matthew Tobin, Jennings Lang, David Spielberg, Norman Bartold, Julie Payne, Johnny Haymer, Leo McElroy, Lisa Urette, Robert Stirrat	
M A R C H	2	Take Down	Buena Vista Distribution / American Film Consortium	Kieth Merrill (director/screenplay); Eric Hendershot (screenplay); Edward Herrmann, Lorenzo Lamas, Maureen McCormick, Kathleen Lloyd, Maxx Payne, Stephen Furst, Kevin Hooks, Toney Smith, Salvador Feliciano, Boyd Silversmith, Nicholas Beauvy, Scott Burgi, Lynn Baird, Ron Bartholomew, Vincent Roberts, David M. Thorne, Ray Perry	
M A R C H	7	Starcrash	New World Pictures / Bancom Audiovision Corporation / Film Enterprise Productions	Luigi Cozzi (director/screenplay); Nat Wachsberger, R.A. Dillon (screenplay); Marjoe Gortner, Caroline Munro, David Hasselhoff, Joe Spinell, Robert Tessier, Nadia Cassini, Judd Hamilton, Christopher Plummer	
M A R C H	8	The Promise	Universal Pictures	Gilbert Cates (director); Garry Michael White, Fred Weintraub (screenplay); Kathleen Quinlan, Stephen Collins, Beatrice Straight, Laurence Luckinbill, William Prince, Bibi Besch, Michael O'Hare, Paul Ryan, Michael Collins	
M A R C H	14	Hair	United Artists Pictures / CIP Filmproduktion GmbH	Miloš Forman (director); Michael Weller (screenplay); John Savage, Treat Williams, Beverly D'Angelo, Annie Golden, Dorsey Wright, Don Dacus, Cheryl Barnes, Melba Moore, Ronnie Dyson, Nell Carter, Richard Bright, Ellen Foley, Miles Chapin, Charlotte Rae, Laurie Beechman, Nicholas Ray, Antonia Rey, George J. Manos, Michael Jeter, Renn Woods, David Rose	
M A R C H	14	Tourist Trap	Compass International Pictures / Manson International Pictures / Mid-America Releasing / Charles Band Productions	David Schmoeller (director/screenplay); J. Larry Carroll (screenplay); Chuck Connors, Jocelyn Jones, Jon Van Ness, Robin Sherwood, Tanya Roberts, Dawn Jeffory-Nelson, Keith McDermott, Linnea Quigley	
M A R C H	14	Voices	United Artists / Cinema International Corporation	Robert Markowitz (director); John Herzfeld (screenplay); Michael Ontkean, Amy Irving, Alex Rocco, Herbert Berghof, Barry Miller, Allan Rich, Viveca Lindfors	
M A R C H	16	California Dreaming	American International Pictures	John D. Hancock (director); Ned Wynn (screenplay); Glynnis O'Connor, Dennis Christopher, Seymour Cassel, Tanya Roberts, Dorothy Tristan, John Calvin, Todd Susman, Alice Playten	
M A R C H	16	The China Syndrome	Columbia Pictures / IPC Films / Major Studio Partners	James Bridges (director/screenplay); Mike Gray, T. S. Cook (screenplay); Jane Fonda, Jack Lemmon, Michael Douglas, Scott Brady, Wilford Brimley, James Hampton, Peter Donat, Richard Herd, Daniel Valdez, Stan Bohrman, James Karen	
M A R C H	16	The Riddle of the Sands	Rank Film Distributors / Worldmark Productions	Tony Maylam (director/screenplay); John Bailey (screenplay); Michael York, Simon MacCorkindale, Jenny Agutter, Alan Badel, Michael Sheard, Hans Meyer, Wolf Kahler, Olga Lowe, Jurgen Andersen, Ronald Markham	
M A R C H	21	The Bell Jar	AVCO Embassy Pictures	Larry Peerce (director); Marjorie Kellogg (screenplay); Marilyn Hassett, Julie Harris, Anne Jackson, Barbara Barrie, Robert Klein, Donna Mitchell, Mary Louise Weller, Jameson Parker, Thaao Penghlis, Scott McKay, Meg Mundy	
M A R C H	23	Boulevard Nights	Warner Bros.	Michael Pressman (director); Desmond Nakano (screenplay); Richard Yniguez, Danny De La Paz, Marta DuBois, Carmen Zapata, James Victor, Victor Millan, Garret Pearson, Betty Carvalho, Gary Cervantes, Jerado Carmona, Jesse Aragon, Roberto Covarrubia, Eliseo Estrada, Dawson Mays	
M A R C H	28	Phantasm	AVCO Embassy Pictures / New Breed Productions	Don Coscarelli (director/screenplay); Angus Scrimm, Michael Baldwin, Bill Thornbury, Reggie Bannister, Kathy Lester, Bill Cone, Mary Ellen Shaw, Terrie Kalbus, Lynn Eastman	

== April–June ==
Opening		Title	Production company	Cast and crew	Ref.
A P R I L	4	The Champ	United Artists / Cinema International Corporation	Franco Zeffirelli (director); Frances Marion, Walter Newman (screenplay); Jon Voight, Faye Dunaway, Ricky Schroder, Jack Warden, Arthur Hill, Joan Blondell, Strother Martin, Elisha Cook Jr., Stefan Gierasch, Mary Jo Catlett, Kristoff St. John, Dana Elcar	
A P R I L	6	The Fifth Musketeer	Columbia Pictures	Ken Annakin (director); David Ambrose, George Bruce (screenplay); Beau Bridges, Sylvia Kristel, Ursula Andress, Cornel Wilde, Ian McShane, Lloyd Bridges, José Ferrer, Alan Hale Jr., Olivia de Havilland, Rex Harrison, Helmut Dantine, Patrick Pinney	
A P R I L	6	Love at First Bite	American International Pictures / Melvin Simon Productions	Stan Dragoti (director); Robert Kaufman (screenplay); George Hamilton, Susan Saint James, Richard Benjamin, Arte Johnson, Dick Shawn, Ronnie Schell, Isabel Sanford, Sherman Hemsley, Barry Gordon, Bob Basso, Bryan O'Byrne, Ralph Manza, Michael Pataki	
A P R I L	6	A Perfect Couple	20th Century Fox	Robert Altman (director/screenplay); Allan F. Nicholls (screenplay); Paul Dooley, Marta Heflin, Titos Vandis, Belita Moreno, Henry Gibson, Dimitra Arliss, Allan F. Nicholls, Dennis Franz, Mona Golabek, Joel Crothers, Ann Ryerson, Poppy Lagos, Margery Bond, Susan Blakeman, Melanie Bishop	
A P R I L	11	The Exorcist (re-release)	Warner Bros.	William Friedkin (director); William Peter Blatty (screenplay); Ellen Burstyn, Max von Sydow, Lee J. Cobb, Kitty Winn, Jack MacGowran, Jason Miller, Linda Blair, Father William O'Malley, Father Thomas Bermingham, Peter Masterson, Robert Symonds, Barton Heyman, Rudolf Schündler, Arthur Storch, Titos Vandis, William Peter Blatty, Mercedes McCambridge, Eileen Dietz, Vasiliki Maliaros, Dick Callinan, Gina Petrushka	
A P R I L	12	Hurricane	Paramount Pictures / Dino De Laurentiis Productions	Jan Troell (director); Lorenzo Semple Jr. (screenplay); Jason Robards, Mia Farrow, Max von Sydow, Trevor Howard, Timothy Bottoms, James Keach, Dayton Ka'ne, Ariirau Tekurarere, Bernadette Sarcione	
A P R I L	12	Mad Max	Warner Bros. / Roadshow Film Distributors / Kennedy Miller Productions	George Miller (director/screenplay); James McCausland (screenplay); Mel Gibson, Joanne Samuel, Hugh Keays-Byrne, Steve Bisley, Tim Burns, Roger Ward, Geoff Parry, Jonathan Hardy, Brendan Heath, Sheila Florence, John Ley, Steve Millichamp, Vincent Gil, Lulu Pinkus, Reg Evans, Karen Moregold	
A P R I L	13	Firepower	Associated Film Distribution / ITC Entertainment / Michael Winner Productions	Michael Winner (director); Gerard Wilson (screenplay); Sophia Loren, James Coburn, O. J. Simpson, Eli Wallach, Anthony Franciosa, George Grizzard, Vincent Gardenia, Victor Mature, Jake LaMotta, Hank Garrett, George Touliatos, Conrad Roberts, Billy Barty, Vincent Beck, Dominic Chianese, Andrew Duncan, Paul D'Amato	
A P R I L	20	Ashanti	Warner Bros. / Columbia Pictures	Richard Fleischer (director); Stephen Geller (screenplay); Michael Caine, Peter Ustinov, Kabir Bedi, Beverly Johnson, Omar Sharif, Rex Harrison, William Holden, Zia Mohyeddin, Winston Ntshona, Jean-Luc Bideau, Olu Jacobs, Johnny Sekka, Tariq Yunus, Tyrone Jackson, Marne Maitland, Eric Pohlmann, Akosua Busia	
A P R I L	20	Tilt	Warner Bros.	Rudy Durand (director/screenplay); Brooke Shields, Ken Marshall, Charles Durning, Lorenzo Lamas, Don Stark, John Crawford, Geoffrey Lewis, Karen Lamm, Robert Brian Berger, Harvey Lewis	
A P R I L	25	Manhattan	United Artists	Woody Allen (director/screenplay); Woody Allen, Diane Keaton, Michael Murphy, Mariel Hemingway, Meryl Streep, Anne Byrne, Michael O'Donoghue, Wallace Shawn, Karen Ludwig, Charles Levin, Karen Allen, David Rasche, Mark Linn-Baker, Frances Conroy	
A P R I L	27	An Almost Perfect Affair	Paramount Pictures	Michael Ritchie (director); Walter Bernstein, Don Peterson (screenplay); Keith Carradine, Monica Vitti, Raf Vallone, Christian De Sica, Dick Anthony Williams, Anna Maria Horsford, Katya Berger, Andy Ho, Henri Garcin, Sady Rebbot, Gérard Buhr, Chau Luang Ham, Jean-Pierre Zola, François Viaur, Farrah Fawcett	
A P R I L	27	Dreamer	20th Century Fox	Noel Nosseck (director); James Proctor, Larry Bischof (screenplay); Tim Matheson, Susan Blakely, Jack Warden, Richard B. Shull, Barbara Stuart, Owen Bush, John Crawford, Marya Small, Matt Clark, Morgan Farley, Pedro Gonzalez Gonzalez, Speedy Zapata, JoBe Cerny, Azizi Johari, Dick Weber, Chris Schenkel, Nelson Burton Jr., Julian Byrd, Rita Ascot Boyd	
A P R I L	27	A Little Romance	Orion Pictures	George Roy Hill (director/screenplay); Allan Burns (screenplay); Laurence Olivier, Arthur Hill, Sally Kellerman, Diane Lane, Thelonious Bernard, Broderick Crawford, David Dukes, Anna Massey, Dominique Lavanant, Mike Marshall, Andrew Duncan, Claudette Sutherland, Graham Fletcher-Cook, Ashby Semple, Claude Brosset, Jacques Maury, Peter Maloney, Isabel Duby	
A P R I L	27	Saint Jack	New World Pictures	Peter Bogdanovich (director/screenplay); Howard Sackler, Paul Theroux (screenplay); Ben Gazzara, Denholm Elliott, James Villiers, Joss Ackland, Rodney Bewes, Mark Kingston, Lisa Lu, George Lazenby, Peter Bogdanovich, Monika Subramaniam, Judy Lim, Joseph Noël	
M A Y	1	Fast Charlie... the Moonbeam Rider	Universal Pictures	Steve Carver (director); Michael Gleason (screenplay); David Carradine, Brenda Vaccaro, L. Q. Jones, R. G. Armstrong, Terry Kiser, Jesse Vint, Noble Willingham, Ralph James, Bill Bartman, David Hayward II, Whit Clay, Jack Hunsucker	
M A Y	3	Winds of Change	Sanrio Communications	Takashi Masunaga (director/screenplay); Ovid (screenplay);	
M A Y	4	Last Embrace	United Artists	Jonathan Demme (director); David Shaber (screenplay); Roy Scheider, Janet Margolin, John Glover, Sam Levene, Charles Napier, Christopher Walken, Jacqueline Brookes, Andrew Duncan, David Margulies, Marcia Rodd, Gary Goetzman, Lou Gilbert, Mandy Patinkin, Max Wright, Sandy McLeod	
M A Y	11	Beneath the Valley of the Ultra-Vixens		Russ Meyer (director/screenplay); Roger Ebert (screenplay); Kitten Natividad, Anne Marie, June Mack, Uschi Digard, Stuart Lancaster, Steve Tracy, DeForest Covan, Russ Meyer, Ken Kerr, Candy Samples, Lola Langusta, Patrick Wright, Michael E. Finn, Sharon Hill, Henry Rowland, Robert E. Pearson, Don Scarbrough, Aram Katcher, Mary Gavin	
M A Y	12	Ravagers	Columbia Pictures / Cinecorp	Richard Compton (director); Donald S. Sanford (screenplay); Richard Harris, Ernest Borgnine, Ann Turkel, Art Carney, Anthony James, Alana Stewart, Woody Strode, Seymour Cassel, Bob Westmoreland, Kate Bray, Brian Carney, Kurt Grayson, Gordon Hyde, George Stokes	
M A Y	14	The Kids Are Alright	New World Pictures	Jeff Stein (director); The Who	
M A Y	15	Zulu Dawn	American Cinema Releasing	Douglas Hickox (director); Cy Endfield, Anthony Storey (screenplay); Burt Lancaster, Peter O'Toole, Simon Ward, Nigel Davenport, Michael Jayston, Peter Vaughan, Denholm Elliott, James Faulkner, John Mills, Christopher Cazenove, Bob Hoskins, Ronald Pickup, Ronald Lacey, Ken Gampu, Simon Sabela, Abe Temba, Gilbert Tiabane	
M A Y	17	Winter Kills	AVCO Embassy Pictures	William Richert (director/screenplay); Jeff Bridges, John Huston, Anthony Perkins, Eli Wallach, Sterling Hayden, Belinda Bauer, Dorothy Malone, Tomas Milian, Toshiro Mifune, Richard Boone, Ralph Meeker, David Spielberg, Brad Dexter, Gladys Hill, Joe Spinell, Irving Selbst, Sidney Lanier, Lissette Álvarez, Byron Morrow, John Warner, Tisa Farrow, Gianni Russo, Kim O'Brien, Erin Gray, Elizabeth Taylor, Ed Madsen	
M A Y	18	Hanover Street	Columbia Pictures / Hanover Street Productions	Peter Hyams (director/screenplay); Harrison Ford, Lesley-Anne Down, Christopher Plummer, Alec McCowen, Richard Masur, Michael Sacks, John Ratzenberger, Jay Benedict, Patsy Kensit, Max Wall, Shane Rimmer, Sherrie Hewson, Eric Stine, Jeff Hawke	
M A Y	18	Over the Edge	Orion Pictures	Jonathan Kaplan (director); Charles S. Haas, Tim Hunter (screenplay); Michael Kramer, Matt Dillon, Pamela Ludwig, Vincent Spano, Harry Northup, Tom Fergus, Andy Romano, Ellen Geer, Richard Jamison, Julia Pomeroy	
M A Y	25	Alien	20th Century Fox / Brandywine Productions	Ridley Scott (director); Dan O'Bannon (screenplay); Tom Skerritt, Sigourney Weaver, Veronica Cartwright, Harry Dean Stanton, John Hurt, Ian Holm, Yaphet Kotto, Bolaji Badejo, Helen Horton	
M A Y	25	Beyond the Poseidon Adventure	Warner Bros.	Irwin Allen (director); Nelson Gidding (screenplay); Michael Caine, Sally Field, Telly Savalas, Peter Boyle, Jack Warden, Shirley Knight, Slim Pickens, Angela Cartwright, Mark Harmon, Shirley Jones, Karl Malden, Veronica Hamel, Paul Picerni, Patrick Culliton, Dean Raphael Ferrandini	
M A Y	25	Jaws (re-release)	Universal Pictures / Zanuck/Brown Company	Steven Spielberg (director); Peter Benchley, Carl Gottlieb (screenplay); Roy Scheider, Robert Shaw, Richard Dreyfuss, Lorraine Gary, Murray Hamilton, Carl Gottlieb, Jeffrey Kramer, Susan Backlinie, Lee Fierro, Peter Benchley	
M A Y	25	The Prisoner of Zenda	Universal Pictures / The Mirisch Corporation	Richard Quine (director); Dick Clement, Ian La Frenais (screenplay); Peter Sellers, Lynne Frederick, Lionel Jeffries, Elke Sommer, Gregory Sierra, Simon Williams, Jeremy Kemp, Catherine Schell, Stuart Wilson, John Laurie, Graham Stark	
M A Y	25	Wanda Nevada	United Artists	Peter Fonda (director); Dennis Hackin (screenplay); Peter Fonda, Brooke Shields, Fiona Lewis, Luke Askew, Ted Markland, Severn Darden, Paul Fix, Henry Fonda	
J U N E	1	The Brood	New World Pictures / Canadian Film Development Corporation	David Cronenberg (director/screenplay); Oliver Reed, Samantha Eggar, Art Hindle, Nuala Fitzgerald, Susan Hogan, Nicholas Campbell, Michael Magee, Robert A. Silverman, Larry Solway, Gary McKeehan, Cindy Hinds, Harry Beckman	
J U N E	6	Escape to Athena	Associated Film Distribution / ITC Entertainment	George P. Cosmatos (director); Edward Anhalt, Richard S. Lochte (screenplay); Roger Moore, Telly Savalas, David Niven, Stefanie Powers, Claudia Cardinale, Richard Roundtree, Sonny Bono, Elliott Gould, Anthony Valentine, Siegfried Rauch, Richard Wren, Michael Sheard, Philip Locke, Steve Ubels, Paul Picerni, Paul Stassino	
J U N E	8	Players	Paramount Pictures	Anthony Harvey (director); Arnold Schulman (screenplay); Ali MacGraw, Dean Paul Martin, Maximilian Schell, Steve Guttenberg, Pancho Gonzalez, Guillermo Vilas, Ilie Năstase, John McEnroe	
J U N E	8	The Plumber	CEL (video)	Peter Weir (director/screenplay); Judy Morris, Ivar Kants, Robert Coleby, Candy Raymond, Henri Szeps	
J U N E	15	Butch and Sundance: The Early Days	20th Century Fox	Richard Lester (director); Allan Burns (screenplay); Tom Berenger, William Katt, Jeff Corey, John Schuck, Michael C. Gwynne, Peter Weller, Brian Dennehy, Christopher Lloyd, Jill Eikenberry, Joel Fluellen, Regina Baff, Peter Brocco, Vincent Schiavelli, Hugh Gillin, Sherril Lynn Rettino, Elya Baskin	
J U N E	15	The Driller Killer	Rochelle Films / Cult Epics	Abel Ferrara (director); Nicholas St. John (screenplay); Jimmy Laine, Carolyn Manz, Baybi Day, Harry Schultz II, Alan Wynroth, Maria Helhoski, James O'Hara, Richard Howorth, Rhodney Montreal, Butch Morris	
J U N E	15	Goldengirl	AVCO Embassy Pictures / Backstage Productions	Joseph Sargent (director); John Kohn (screenplay); Susan Anton, James Coburn, Leslie Caron, Robert Culp, Harry Guardino, Curd Jürgens, James A. Watson Jr., Ward Costello, Michael Lerner, John Newcombe, Nicolas Coster, Jessica Walter	
J U N E	15	The In-Laws	Warner Bros.	Arthur Hiller (director); Andrew Bergman (screenplay); Peter Falk, Alan Arkin, Richard Libertini, Nancy Dussault, Penny Peyser, Arlene Golonka, Michael Lembeck, Paul Lawrence Smith, Carmine Caridi, Ed Begley Jr., James Hong, David Paymer, Kent Williams, John Hancock, John Finnegan, Eduardo Noriega, Rosana Soto, Carmen Dragon, Sammy Smith, Barbara Dana, Rozsika Halmos, Alvaro Carcano, Jorge Zepeda, Sergio Calderón, Danny Kwan	
J U N E	15	The Night the Prowler	International Harmony / Chariot Films / New South Wales Film Corporation	Jim Sharman (director); Patrick White (screenplay); Ruth Cracknell, John Frawley, Kerry Walker, John Derum, Maggie Kirkpatrick, Terry Camilleri, Harry Neilson	
J U N E	15	Prophecy	Paramount Pictures	John Frankenheimer (director); David Seltzer (screenplay); Robert Foxworth, Talia Shire, Armand Assante, Victoria Racimo, Richard A. Dysart, George Clutesi, Burke Byrnes, Tom McFadden, Graham Jarvis, Kevin Peter Hall, Tom McLoughlin, Mia Bendixsen, Johnny Timko, Charles H. Gray, Everett Creach, Charles Flemmer	
J U N E	15	Rocky II	United Artists / Chartoff-Winkler Productions	Sylvester Stallone (director/screenplay); Sylvester Stallone, Talia Shire, Burt Young, Carl Weathers, Burgess Meredith, Tony Burton, Sylvia Meals, Seargeoh Stallone, Joe Spinell, Paul J. Micale, Jeff Temkin, Lou Filippo, Brent Musburger, Stu Nahan, Bill Baldwin, LeRoy Neiman	
J U N E	15	Walk Proud	Universal Pictures	Robert L. Collins (director); Evan Hunter (screenplay); Robby Benson, Sarah Holcomb, Henry Darrow, Pepe Serna, Trinidad Silva, Ji-Tu Cumbuka, Lawrence Pressman, Brad Sullivan, Irene DeBari, Eloy Casados, Panchito Gómez, Rod Masterson, Ángel Salazar, Daniel Faraldo, Tony Alvarenga, Aesop Aquarian, Gary Carlos Cervantes, Lee Fraser, Claudio Martinez, Rose Portillo, Luis Reyes, Judith Searle	
J U N E	15	The Water Babies	The Samuel Goldwyn Company	Lionel Jeffries (director); Michael Robson (screenplay); James Mason, Bernard Cribbins, Billie Whitelaw, Joan Greenwood, David Tomlinson, Tommy Pender, Samantha Gates, Paul Luty, Jon Pertwee, Lance Percival, David Jason, Una Stubbs, Olive Gregg, Cass Allan, Liz Proud	
J U N E	22	Escape from Alcatraz	Paramount Pictures / The Malpaso Company	Don Siegel (director); Richard Tuggle (screenplay); Clint Eastwood, Patrick McGoohan, Fred Ward, Jack Thibeau, Larry Hankin, Frank Ronzio, Roberts Blossom, Paul Benjamin, Bruce M. Fischer, Madison Arnold, Don Michaelian, Danny Glover	
J U N E	22	The Kirlian Witness	Paramount Pictures	Jonathan Sarno (director); Nancy Snyder, Nancy Boykin, Joel Colodner, Ted Le Plat, Lawrence Tierney, Maia Danziger	
J U N E	22	The Main Event	Warner Bros. / First Artists / Barwood Films	Howard Zieff (director); Gail Parent, Andrew Smith (screenplay); Barbra Streisand, Ryan O'Neal, Paul Sand, Whitman Mayo, Patti D'Arbanville, Chu Chu Malave, Richard Lawson, James Gregory	
J U N E	22	The Muppet Movie	Associated Film Distribution / Henson Associates / ITC Films	James Frawley (director); Jerry Juhl, Jack Burns (screenplay); Jim Henson, Frank Oz, Jerry Nelson, Richard Hunt, Dave Goelz, Caroll Spinney, Steve Whitmire, Charles Durning, Austin Pendleton, Scott Walker, Hard Boiled Haggerty, Bruce Kirby, James Frawley, Melinda Dillon, Dom DeLuise, James Coburn, Madeline Kahn, Telly Savalas, Carol Kane, Paul Williams, Milton Berle, Elliott Gould, Edgar Bergen, Bob Hope, Richard Pryor, Steve Martin, Mel Brooks, Cloris Leachman, Orson Welles, Tim Burton, John Landis, Kathryn Mullen, Bob Payne, Eren Ozker, Bruce Schwartz, Michael Earl Davis, Caroly Wilcox, Olga Felgemacher, Buz Suraci, Tony Basilicato, Adam Hunt	
J U N E	22	Nightwing	Columbia Pictures	Arthur Hiller (director); Martin Cruz Smith, Steve Shagan, Bud Shrake (screenplay); Nick Mancuso, David Warner, Kathryn Harrold, Stephen Macht, Ben Piazza, Strother Martin, Charles Hallahan, George Clutesi	
J U N E	27	The Apple Dumpling Gang Rides Again	Walt Disney Productions / Buena Vista Distribution	Vincent McEveety (director); Don Tait (screenplay); Tim Conway, Don Knotts, Tim Matheson, Kenneth Mars, Elyssa Davalos, Jack Elam, Robert Pine, Harry Morgan, Ruth Buzzi, Audrey Totter, Richard X. Slattery, John Crawford, Ralph Manza, Cliff Osmond, Morgan Paull, Gary McLarty, Nick Ramus, Bryan O'Byrne, Robert Totten, Shug Fisher, Roger Mobley, Stu Gilliam, A. J. Bakunas, David S. Cass Sr., George Chandler, Jack Perkins, Art Evans, Peter Renaday, Mickey Gilbert, Ted Gehring, James Almanzar, Rex Holman, Joe Baker, Allan Studley	
J U N E	27	The 36th Chamber of Shaolin	Shaw Brothers Studio / World Northal	Lau Kar-leung (director); I Kuang (screenplay); Gordon Liu, Lo Lieh, Wang Yu, Yu Yang, Hsu Shao-Chiang, Wu Hang-Sheng, Hoi Sang Lee	
J U N E	29	Bloodline	Paramount Pictures	Terence Young (director); Laird Koenig (screenplay); Audrey Hepburn, Ben Gazzara, James Mason, Claudia Mori, Irene Papas, Michelle Phillips, Maurice Ronet, Romy Schneider, Omar Sharif, Beatrice Straight, Gert Fröbe, Marcel Bozzuffi, Pinkas Braun, Ivan Desny, Vadim Glowna, Walter Kohut, Wolfgang Preiss, Hans von Borsody, Charles Millot	
J U N E	29	Meatballs	Paramount Pictures / Famous Players / Canadian Film Development Corporation / Haliburton Films	Ivan Reitman (director); Len Blum, Dan Goldberg, Janis Allen, Harold Ramis (screenplay); Bill Murray, Harvey Atkin, Kate Lynch, Russ Banham, Kristine DeBell, Sarah Torgov, Jack Blum, Keith Knight, Matt Craven, Chris Makepeace, Hadley Kay, Cindy Girling, Todd Hoffman, Margot Pinvidic, Norma Dell'Agnese	
J U N E	29	Moonraker	United Artists / Eon Productions / Les Productions Artistes Associés	Lewis Gilbert (director); Christopher Wood (screenplay); Roger Moore, Lois Chiles, Michael Lonsdale, Richard Kiel, Corinne Cléry, Bernard Lee, Geoffrey Keen, Desmond Llewelyn, Lois Maxwell, Toshiro Suga, Emily Bolton, Blanche Ravalec, Irka Bochenko, Michael Marshall, Leila Shenna, Anne Lonnberg, Jean-Pierre Castaldi, Walter Gotell, Alfie Bass, Claude Carliez	
J U N E	29	Up from the Depths	New World Pictures	Charles B. Griffith (director); Anne Dyer, Alfred Sweeney (screenplay); Sam Bottoms, Susanne Reed, Virgil Frye, Kedric Wolfe, Charles Howerton, Denise Hayes, R. Lee Ermey	

== July–September ==
Opening		Title	Production company	Cast and crew	Ref.
J U L Y	3	J-Men Forever	Pan-Canadian Film Distributors / International Harmony	Richard Patterson (director); Peter Bergman, Philip Proctor (screenplay); Peter Bergman, M. G. Kelly, Philip Proctor	
J U L Y	5	Arabian Adventure	Associated Film Distribution / EMI Films / British Lion Films	Kevin Connor (director); Brian Hayles (screenplay); Christopher Lee, Milo O'Shea, Oliver Tobias, Emma Samms, Puneet Sira, Peter Cushing, Capucine, Mickey Rooney, John Wyman, John Ratzenberger, Shane Rimmer, Hal Galili, Art Malik, Milton Reid, Elisabeth Welch, Suzanne Danielle, Roy Stewart	
J U L Y	6	Nutcracker Fantasy	Sanrio	Takeo Nakamura (director); Shintaro Tsuji, Eugene A. Fournier, Thomas Joachim (screenplay)	
J U L Y	11	The Last of the Knucklemen	Umbrella Entertainment / Hexagon Productions	Tim Burstall (director/screenplay); Gerard Kennedy, Michael Preston, Peter Hehir, Dennis Miller, Michael Caton, Steve Rackman, Michael Duffield, Steve Bisley, Stewart Faichney, Gerry Duggan	
J U L Y	11	Plague	Group 1 Films / Harmony Ridge	Ed Hunt (director/screenplay); Barry Pearson (screenplay); Daniel Pilon, Kate Reid, Celine Lomez, Michael J. Reynolds, John Kerr	
J U L Y	13	Just You and Me, Kid	Columbia Pictures	Leonard B. Stern (director); Leonard B. Stern, Oliver Hailey (screenplay); George Burns, Brooke Shields, Lorraine Gary, Ray Bolger, Leon Ames, Carl Ballantine, Keye Luke, Burl Ives, John Schuck, Nicolas Coster, Andrea Howard, William Russ, Christopher Knight, Julie Cobb	
J U L Y	13	Breaking Away	20th Century Fox	Peter Yates (director); Steve Tesich (screenplay); Dennis Christopher, Dennis Quaid, Daniel Stern, Jackie Earle Haley, Barbara Barrie, Paul Dooley, Robyn Douglass, Hart Bochner, P. J. Soles, Amy Wright, John Ashton	
J U L Y	13	Dracula	Universal Pictures / The Mirisch Company	John Badham (director); W. D. Richter (screenplay); Frank Langella, Laurence Olivier, Donald Pleasence, Kate Nelligan, Jan Francis, Trevor Eve, Tony Haygarth, Sylvester McCoy, Janine Duvitski, Teddy Turner	
J U L Y	13	The Frisco Kid	Warner Bros.	Robert Aldrich (director); Michael Elias, Frank Shaw (screenplay); Gene Wilder, Harrison Ford, Ramon Bieri, Val Bisoglio, George DiCenzo, Leo Fuchs, Penny Peyser, William Smith, Jack Somack, Beege Barkette, Shay Duffin, Frank De Vol, Joe Kapp, Clyde Kusatsu, Vincent Schiavelli, Ian Wolfe, Martin Garner, Cliff Pellow, Eda Reiss Merin, Walter Janowitz	
J U L Y	13	The Wanderers	Orion Pictures	Philip Kaufman (director/screenplay); Rose Kaufman (screenplay); Ken Wahl, John Friedrich, Karen Allen, Toni Kalem, Jim Youngs, Tony Ganios, Alan Rosenberg, Dolph Sweet, William Andrews, Erland van Lidth, Linda Manz, Michael Wright, Samm-Art Williams, Val Avery, Dion Albanese, Olympia Dukakis, Richard Price, Wayne Knight	
J U L Y	26	The Europeans	Levitt-Pickman / Merchant Ivory Productions	James Ivory (director); Ruth Prawer Jhabvala (screenplay); Lee Remick, Robin Ellis, Wesley Addy, Tim Woodward, Tim Choate, Lisa Eichhorn, Kristin Griffith, Nancy New, Norman Snow, Helen Stenborg, Gedda Petry	
J U L Y	26	Unidentified Flying Oddball	Walt Disney Productions / Buena Vista Distribution	Russ Mayberry (director); Don Tait (screenplay); Dennis Dugan, Jim Dale, Ron Moody, Kenneth More, John Le Mesurier, Rodney Bewes, Sheila White, Robert Beatty, Cyril Shaps, Kevin Brennan, Ewen Solon, Pat Roach, Reg Lye	
J U L Y	27	The Amityville Horror	American International Pictures / Cinema 77 / Professional Films, Inc.	Stuart Rosenberg (director); Sandor Stern (screenplay); James Brolin, Margot Kidder, Rod Steiger, Murray Hamilton, Don Stroud, John Larch, Natasha Ryan, K.C. Martel, Meeno Peluce, Michael Sacks, Helen Shaver, Amy Wright, Val Avery, Elsa Raven, Irene Dailey, Eddie Barth, James Tolkan, Marc Vahanian, Ellen Saland	
J U L Y	27	A Force of One	American Cinema Releasing	Paul Aaron (director); Pat E. Johnson, Ernest Tidyman (screenplay); Chuck Norris, Jennifer O'Neill, Clu Gulager, Ron O'Neal, Bill Wallace, Eric Laneuville, James Whitmore Jr., Clint Ritchie, Pepe Serna, Ray Vitte, Chu Chu Malave, Mel Novak, Kevin Geer, Karen Obediear, Taylor Lacher, Lisa James, Eugene Butler	
J U L Y	27	The Villain	Columbia Pictures / Rastar	Hal Needham (director); Robert G. Kane (screenplay); Kirk Douglas, Arnold Schwarzenegger, Ann-Margret, Paul Lynde, Foster Brooks, Strother Martin, Ruth Buzzi, Jack Elam, Mel Tillis, Robert Tessier	
A U G U S T	1	North Dallas Forty	Paramount Pictures / Regina Associates	Ted Kotcheff (director/screenplay); Peter Gent, Frank Yablans (screenplay); Nick Nolte, Mac Davis, Charles Durning, Dayle Haddon, Bo Svenson, John Matuszak, Steve Forrest, G. D. Spradlin, Dabney Coleman, Savannah Smith Boucher, Marshall Colt	
A U G U S T	3	The Concorde ... Airport '79	Universal Pictures	David Lowell Rich (director); Eric Roth (screenplay); Alain Delon, Susan Blakely, Robert Wagner, Eddie Albert, Bibi Andersson, Charo, Sybil Danning, John Davidson, Monica Lewis, Andrea Marcovicci, Mercedes McCambridge, Martha Raye, Avery Schreiber, Cicely Tyson, Jimmie Walker, David Warner, George Kennedy, Sylvia Kristel, Pierre Jalbert, Nicolas Coster, Robin Gammell, Ed Begley Jr., Jon Cedar, Macon McCalman, Kathleen Maguire, Stacy Heather Tolkin, Marneen Fields, Harry Shearer	
A U G U S T	3	More American Graffiti	Universal Pictures / Lucasfilm	Bill L. Norton (director/screenplay); Paul Le Mat, Cindy Williams, Candy Clark, Charles Martin Smith, Mackenzie Phillips, Bo Hopkins, Ron Howard, Anna Bjorn, Scott Glenn, Mary Kay Place, Wolfman Jack, Richard Bradford, Harrison Ford, James Houghton, Manuel Padilla, Jr., Will Seltzer, Jon Gries, Delroy Lindo, Rosanna Arquette, Naomi Judd, Steve Evans, Wayne Coy, John Lansing, Monica Tenner, Carol-Ann Williams, Tom Baker	
A U G U S T	5	Meetings with Remarkable Men	Enterprise Pictures Ltd.	Peter Brook (director); G.I. Gurdjieff, Jeanne de Salzmann (screenplay); Dragan Maksimović, Terence Stamp, Mikica Dimitrijevic, Warren Mitchell, Athol Fugard, David Markham, Natasha Parry, Colin Blakely, Grégoire Aslan, Tom Fleming, Andrew Keir, Donald Sumpter, Gerry Sundquist, Martin Benson, Bruce Purchase, Roger Lloyd-Pack	
A U G U S T	10	Americathon	United Artists / Lorimar	Neal Israel (director/screenplay); Michael Mislove, Monica Johnson (screenplay); John Ritter, Harvey Korman, Peter Riegert, Fred Willard, Jay Leno, Chief Dan George, Zane Buzby, Nancy Morgan, Meat Loaf, Elvis Costello, Tommy Lasorda, Howard Hesseman, Cybill Shepherd, Allan Arbus, David Opatoshu, George Carlin	
A U G U S T	10	Hot Stuff	Columbia Pictures / Rastar	Dom DeLuise (director); Michael Kane, Donald E. Westlake (screenplay); Dom DeLuise, Suzanne Pleshette, Jerry Reed, Ossie Davis, Luis Avalos, Pat McCormick, Marc Lawrence, Sydney Lassick, Robert George	
A U G U S T	10	Sunburn	Paramount Pictures / Fawcett-Majors Productions / Tuesday Films / Hemdale Film Corporation / Bind Films	Richard C. Sarafian (director); James Booth, John Daly, Stephen Oliver (screenplay); Farrah Fawcett-Majors, Charles Grodin, Art Carney, Joan Collins, William Daniels, John Hillerman, Eleanor Parker, Keenan Wynn, Joan Goodfellow, Jack Kruschen, Alejandro Rey, Seymour Cassel, Alex Sharp, Bob Orrison, Robin Clarke, Jorge Luke, Joanna Rush, Delroy White, Christa Walter	
A U G U S T	15	Apocalypse Now	United Artists / Omni Zoetrope	Francis Ford Coppola (director/screenplay); John Milius (screenplay); Marlon Brando, Robert Duvall, Martin Sheen, Frederic Forrest, Albert Hall, Sam Bottoms, Larry Fishburne, Dennis Hopper, G. D. Spradlin, Jerry Ziesmer, Harrison Ford, Scott Glenn, Colleen Camp, Cynthia Wood, Linda Beatty, Bill Graham, Francis Ford Coppola, Vittorio Storaro, R. Lee Ermey, Michael Herr	
A U G U S T	15	Caligula	Produzioni Atlas Consorziate (P.A.C.) / Analysis Film Releasing Corporation / Penthouse Films International / Felix Cinematografica	Tinto Brass (director/screenplay); Giancarlo Lui, Bob Guccione (directors); Malcolm McDowell, Teresa Ann Savoy, Helen Mirren, Peter O'Toole, John Gielgud, Guido Mannari, Patrick Allen, Giancarlo Badessi, Adriana Asti, Leopoldo Trieste, Paolo Bonacelli, Joss Ackland, John Steiner, Mirella D'Angelo, Richard Parets, Osiride Pevarello, Anneka Di Lorenzo, Bruno Brive, Paula Mitchell, Donato Placido, Lori Wagner, Valerie Rae Clark, Susanne Saxon, Jane Hargrave, Carolyn Patsis, Bonnie Dee Wilson	
A U G U S T	15	Star Wars (re-release)	20th Century Fox / Lucasfilm	George Lucas (director/screenplay); Mark Hamill, Harrison Ford, Carrie Fisher, Peter Cushing, Alec Guinness, Anthony Daniels, Kenny Baker, Peter Mayhew, David Prowse, James Earl Jones, Phil Brown, Shelagh Fraser, Jack Purvis, Eddie Byrne, Denis Lawson, Garrick Hagon, Don Henderson, Leslie Schofield, Richard LeParmentier, Alex McCrindle, Alfie Curtis, Peter Geddis, Michael Leader, Robert Clarke, Patrick Jordan, Drewe Henley, Jack Klaff, William Hootkins, Angus MacInnes, Jeremy Sinden, Scott Beach, Steve Gawley, Joe Johnston, Grant McCune, Peter Sumner, Malcolm Tierney, Phil Tippett	
A U G U S T	17	Monty Python's Life of Brian	Cinema International Corporation / HandMade Films / Python (Monty) Pictures / Orion Pictures	Terry Jones (director); Monty Python (screenplay); Graham Chapman, John Cleese, Terry Gilliam, Eric Idle, Terry Jones, Michael Palin, Terence Bayler, Carol Cleveland, Charles McKeown, Kenneth Colley, Neil Innes, John Young, Gwen Taylor, Sue Jones-Davies, Chris Langham, Andrew MacLachlan, Bernard McKenna, Randy Feelgood, George Harrison, Charles Knode, Spike Milligan	
A U G U S T	17	My Brilliant Career	GUO Film Distributors / The New South Wales Film Corporation / Margaret Fink Productions	Gillian Armstrong (director); Eleanor Witcombe (screenplay); Judy Davis, Sam Neill, Wendy Hughes, Robert Grubb, Max Cullen, Aileen Britton, Peter Whitford, Patricia Kennedy, Alan Hopgood, Julia Blake, David Franklin, Gordon Piper, Simone Buchanan, Marion Shad, Aaron Wood, Sue Davies	
A U G U S T	17	The Prisoner of Zenda	Universal Pictures / The Mirisch Corporation	Richard Quine (director); Dick Clement, Ian La Frenais (screenplay); Peter Sellers, Lynne Frederick, Lionel Jeffries, Elke Sommer, Gregory Sierra, Simon Williams, Jeremy Kemp, Catherine Schell, Stuart Wilson, John Laurie, Graham Stark	
A U G U S T	17	Rich Kids	United Artists	Robert M. Young (director); Judith Ross (screenplay); Trini Alvarado, Jeremy Levy, Kathryn Walker, John Lithgow, Terry Kiser, David Selby, Roberta Maxwell, Paul Dooley, Beatrice Winde, Irene Worth	
A U G U S T	17	The Seduction of Joe Tynan	Universal Pictures	Jerry Schatzberg (director); Alan Alda (screenplay); Alan Alda, Barbara Harris, Meryl Streep, Rip Torn, Melvyn Douglas, Charles Kimbrough, Carrie Nye, Michael Higgins, Blanche Baker, Maureen Anderman, Robert Christian, Maurice Copeland, Marian Hailey, Chris Arnold, John Badila, Lu Elrod	
A U G U S T	24	Rock 'n' Roll High School	New World Pictures	Allan Arkush (director); Richard Whitley, Russ Dvonch, Joseph McBride (screenplay); P. J. Soles, Vince Van Patten, Clint Howard, Dey Young, Ramones, Mary Woronov, Paul Bartel, Dick Miller, Don Steele, Loren Lester, Grady Sutton, Alix Elias, Daniel Davies, Lynn Farrell, Herbie Braha	
A U G U S T	31	City on Fire	AVCO Embassy Pictures / Astral Bellevue Pathé	Alvin Rakoff (director); Jack Hill, Dave Lewis, Céline La Frenière (screenplay); Barry Newman, Susan Clark, Shelley Winters, Leslie Nielsen, James Franciscus, Ava Gardner, Henry Fonda, Jonathan Welsh, Hilary Farr, Mavor Moore, Richard Donat, Donald Pilon, Cec Linder, Murray Cruchley, Anthony Sherwood, Nancy Beatty, Terry Haig, Ken James, Jefferson Mappin, Jérôme Tiberghien, Mel Ryane	
S E P T E M B E R	7	Patrick	Filmways Australian Distributors / Australian International Film Corporation / Australian Film Commission / Victorian Film Corporation	Richard Franklin (director); Everett De Roche (screenplay); Robert Thompson, Susan Penhaligon, Robert Helpmann, Rod Mullinar, Bruce Barry, Julia Blake, Helen Hemingway, Maria Mercedes, Walter Pym, Frank Wilson, John P. Boddie	
S E P T E M B E R	14	Tarzoon: Shame of the Jungle	International Harmony	Picha (director/screenplay); Boris Szulzinger (director); Anne Beatts, Michael O'Donoghue (screenplay); Johnny Weissmuller Jr., John Belushi, Bill Murray, Christopher Guest, Brian Doyle-Murray, Emily Prager, Pat Bright, Adolph Caesar, Judy Graubart, Andrew Duncan, Guy Sorel, Bob Perry, Deya Kent, M. Vernon, Tony Jackson, John Baddeley	
S E P T E M B E R	14	The Tempest		Derek Jarman (director/screenplay); Heathcote Williams, Toyah Willcox, Karl Johnson, Peter Bull, Richard Warwick, David Meyer, Neil Cunningham, Jack Birkett, Christopher Biggins, Peter Turner, Ken Campbell, Elisabeth Welch, Claire Davenport, Helen Wellington-Lloyd, Kate Temple, Angela Wittingham	
S E P T E M B E R	19	The Onion Field	AVCO Embassy Pictures / Black Marble Productions	Harold Becker (director); Joseph Wambaugh (screenplay); John Savage, James Woods, Franklyn Seales, Ted Danson, Ronny Cox, David Huffman, Christopher Lloyd, Dianne Hull, Priscilla Pointer, K Callan, Sandy McPeak, Lillian Randolph, Steve Conte, John de Lancie	
S E P T E M B E R	19	Yanks	Universal Pictures / CIP Filmproduktion GmbH	John Schlesinger (director); Colin Welland, Walter Bernstein (screenplay); Richard Gere, Vanessa Redgrave, William Devane, Lisa Eichhorn, Rachel Roberts, Chick Vennera, Arlen Dean Snyder, Annie Ross, Wendy Morgan, Tony Melody, Derek Thompson, Joe Gladwin	
S E P T E M B E R	21	Heartland	Levitt-Pickman / Filmhaus / The National Endowment for the Humanities / Wilderness Women	Richard Pearce (director); Beth Ferris, William Kittredge, Elinore Randall Stewart (screenplay); Rip Torn, Conchata Ferrell, Barry Primus, Megan Folsom, Lilia Skala, Amy Wright, Jerry Hardin, Jeff Boschee, Mary Boylan, Bob Sirucek	
S E P T E M B E R	21	Mr. Mike's Mondo Video	New Line Cinema	Michael O'Donoghue (director/screenplay); Mitch Glazer, Dirk Wittenborn, Emily Prager (screenplay); Michael O'Donoghue, Dan Aykroyd, Bill Murray, Gilda Radner, Jane Curtin, Laraine Newman, Don Novello, Carrie Fisher, Margot Kidder, Teri Garr, Sid Vicious, Paul Shaffer, Debbie Harry, Root Boy Slim, Klaus Nomi, Robert Delford Brown, Patty Oja	
S E P T E M B E R	28	The Bugs Bunny/Road Runner Movie	Warner Bros. / Chuck Jones Enterprises	Chuck Jones (director/screenplay); Phil Monroe (director); Michael Maltese (screenplay); Mel Blanc, Joan Gerber, Arthur Q. Bryan, Paul Julian	
S E P T E M B E R	28	La Luna	20th Century Fox / Fiction Cinematografica	Bernando Bertolucci (director/screenplay); Giuseppe Bertolucci, Clare Peploe (screenplay); Jill Clayburgh, Matthew Barry, Veronica Lazar, Tomas Milian, Renato Salvatori, Fred Gwynne, Alida Valli, Elisabetta Campeti, Franco Citti, Roberto Benigni, Carlo Verdone, Peter Eyre	
S E P T E M B E R	28	A Man, a Woman, and a Bank	AVCO Embassy Pictures / Bennettfilms Inc. / McNichol	Noel Black (director); Raynold Gideon, Bruce A. Evans, Stuart Margolin (screenplay); Donald Sutherland, Brooke Adams, Paul Mazursky, Leigh Hamilton, Allan Kolman, Kung-Wu Huang	
S E P T E M B E R	28	Sleeping Beauty (re-release)	Walt Disney Productions / Buena Vista Distribution	Clyde Geronimi, Eric Larson, Wolfgang Reitherman, Les Clark (directors); Erdman Penner (screenplay); Mary Costa, Bill Shirley, Eleanor Audley, Verna Felton, Barbara Luddy, Barbara Jo Allen, Taylor Holmes, Bill Thompson, Bobby Amsberry, Candy Candido, Pinto Colvig, Hans Conried, Dallas McKennon, Marvin Miller, Helene Stanley, Ed Kemmer, Jane Fowler, Frances Bavier, Madge Blake, Spring Byington, Don Barclay	
S E P T E M B E R	28	Time After Time	Orion Pictures	Nicholas Meyer (director/screenplay); Malcolm McDowell, David Warner, Mary Steenburgen, Charles Cioffi, Patti D'Arbanville, Joseph Maher, Kent Williams	
S E P T E M B E R	28	When a Stranger Calls	Columbia Pictures / Melvin Simon Productions	Fred Walton (director/screenplay); Steve Feke (screenplay); Charles Durning, Carol Kane, Colleen Dewhurst, Tony Beckley, Carmen Argenziano, Rutanya Alda, William Boyett, Ron O'Neal, Rachel Roberts, Kirsten Larkin, Michael Champion, Steven Anderson, Lenora May	
S E P T E M B E R	28	Wise Blood	New Line Cinema	John Huston (director); Benedict Fitzgerald, Michael Fitzgerald (screenplay); Brad Dourif, Ned Beatty, Harry Dean Stanton, Dan Shor, Amy Wright, Mary Nell Santacroce, John Huston, William Hickey, J.L. Parker, Marvin Sapp, Betty Lou Groover	

== October–December ==
Opening		Title	Production company	Cast and crew	Ref.
O C T O B E R	1	Siberiade	Mosfilm	Andrei Konchalovsky (director/screenplay); Valentin Yezhov (screenplay); Vladimir Samoilov, Natalya Andrejchenko, Vitaly Solomin, Nikita Mikhalkov, Lyudmila Gurchenko, Sergey Shakurov	
O C T O B E R	1	Skatetown, U.S.A.	Columbia Pictures / Rastar	William A. Levey (director); Nick Castle (screenplay); Scott Baio, Patrick Swayze, Flip Wilson, Maureen McCormick, Greg Bradford, Ron Palillo, Judy Landers, Ruth Buzzi, Dorothy Stratten, Joe E. Ross, Dave Mason, Billy Barty, Katherine Kelly Lang, David Landsberg, Sydney Lassick, Murray Langston, Bill Kirchenbauer, Vic Dunlop, Denny Johnston, Len Bari, April Allen	
O C T O B E R	5	10	Orion Pictures	Blake Edwards (director/screenplay); Dudley Moore, Bo Derek, Julie Andrews, Robert Webber, Dee Wallace, Sam J. Jones, Nedra Volz, Brian Dennehy, Max Showalter, Peter Sellers	
O C T O B E R	5	Nosferatu the Vampyre	20th Century Fox / Gaumont / Werner Herzog Filmproduktion / Zweites Deutsches Fernsehen	Werner Herzog (director/screenplay); Klaus Kinski, Isabelle Adjani, Bruno Ganz, Roland Topor, Walter Ladengast, Dan van Husen, Jan Groth, Carsten Bodinus, Martje Grohmann, Rijk de Gooyer, Clemens Scheitz, John Leddy, Tim Beekman, Lo van Hensbergen, Margiet van Hartingsveld	
O C T O B E R	17	The Black Stallion	United Artists / American Zoetrope	Carroll Ballard (director); Melissa Mathison, Jeanne Rosenberg, William D. Wittliff (screenplay); Kelly Reno, Mickey Rooney, Teri Garr, Clarence Muse, Hoyt Axton, Michael Higgins, Ed McNamara, Doghmi Larbi, John Burton, John Buchanan, Kristen Vigard, Fausto Tozzi, John Karlsen, Leopoldo Trieste, Frank Cousins, Don Hudson, Marne Maitland, Tom Dahlgren	
O C T O B E R	19	...And Justice for All.	Columbia Pictures	Norman Jewison (director); Valerie Curtin, Barry Levinson (screenplay); Al Pacino, Jack Warden, John Forsythe, Lee Strasberg, Jeffrey Tambor, Christine Lahti, Sam Levene, Robert Christian, Thomas Waites, Larry Bryggman, Craig T. Nelson, Dominic Chianese, Victor Arnold, Vincent Beck, Michael Gorrin, Baxter Harris, Joe Morton, Alan North, Tom Quinn, Beverly Sanders, Connie Sawyer, Charles Siebert, Robert Symonds, Keith Andes	
O C T O B E R	19	Avalanche Express	20th Century Fox / Lorimar	Mark Robson (director); Abraham Polonsky (screenplay); Lee Marvin, Robert Shaw, Linda Evans, Maximilian Schell, Joe Namath, Horst Buchholz, Mike Connors, Claudio Cassinelli, Kristina Nel, David Hess, Günter Meisner, Sylva Langova, Cyril Shaps, Vladek Sheybal, Arthur Brauss, Sky du Mont, Richard Marner, Arnold Drummond, Paul Glawion, Dan van Husen	
O C T O B E R	19	Chilly Scenes of Winter	United Artists	Joan Micklin Silver (director/screenplay); John Heard, Mary Beth Hurt, Peter Riegert, Kenneth McMillan, Gloria Grahame, Nora Heflin, Jerry Hardin, Tarah Nutter, Mark Metcalf, Griffin Dunne	
O C T O B E R	19	French Postcards	Paramount Pictures	Willard Huyck (director/screenplay); Gloria Katz (screenplay); Miles Chapin, Blanche Baker, David Marshall Grant, Valérie Quennessen, Debra Winger, Mandy Patinkin, Marie-France Pisier, Jean Rochefort, Lynn Carlin, George Coe, Christophe Bourseiller, François Lalande, Anémone, Veronique Jannot, Marie-Anne Chazel, Laurence Ligneres, Andre Penvern	
O C T O B E R	19	Jesus	Warner Bros. / Inspirational Films / Genesis Project	Peter Sykes, John Krish (directors); Barnet Fishbein (screenplay); Brian Deacon, Rivka Neumann, Yosef Shiloach, Talia Shapira, Alexander Scourby, Mosko Alkalai, Eli Cohen, Eli Danker, Dina Doron, Rula Lenska, Niko Nitai, Ori Levy, Kobi Assaf, Moti Baharav, Ya'ackov Ben-Sira, Ze'ev Berlinski, Peter Frye, Nisim Gerama, David Goldberg, Timothy Mark Hanson, Yftach Katzur, Miki Mfir, Yitzhak Ne'eman, Shmuel Ornstein, Richard Peterson, Milo Rafi, Gad Roll, Israel Rubinek, Michael Schneider, Nahum Shalit, Shmuel Tal, Michael Warshaviak, Leonid Weinstein, Rolf Brin, Dov Friedman, Kevin O'Shea, Yossi Pollak, Dada Rubin	
O C T O B E R	19	Meteor	American International Pictures / Meteor Joint Venture / Palladium Productions / Shaw Brothers	Ronald Neame (director); Stanley Mann, Edmund H. North (screenplay); Sean Connery, Natalie Wood, Karl Malden, Brian Keith, Martin Landau, Trevor Howard, Richard Dysart, Henry Fonda, Joseph Campanella, Bo Brundin, Roger Robinson, Michael Zaslow, Bibi Besch, Sybil Danning	
O C T O B E R	26	Derek and Clive Get the Horn	Universal Pictures	Russell Mulcahy (director); Peter Cook, Dudley Moore (screenplay); Peter Cook, Dudley Moore, Judy Huxtable, Richard Branson, Nicola Austine	
O C T O B E R	26	The Great Santini	Orion Pictures / Bing Crosby Productions	Lewis John Carlino (director/screenplay); Robert Duvall, Blythe Danner, Michael O'Keefe, Stan Shaw, Brian Andrews, Paul Gleason, Julie Anne Haddock, David Keith, Paul Mantee, Theresa Merritt, Lisa Jane Persky, Michael Strong, Joe A. Dorsey	
O C T O B E R	26	The Magician of Lublin	Cannon Films / Golan-Globus Productions	Menahem Golan (director/screenplay); Sheldon Patinkin, Irving S. White (screenplay); Alan Arkin, Louise Fletcher, Shelley Winters, Lisa Whelchel, Elspeth March, Valerie Perrine, Maia Danziger, Zachi Noy, Friedrich Schoenfelder, Shaike Ophir, Lou Jacobi, Warren Berlinger, Linda Bernstein	
O C T O B E R	26	The Lady Vanishes	Group 1 Films / Hammer Film Productions	Anthony Page (director); George Axelrod (screenplay); Elliott Gould, Cybill Shepherd, Angela Lansbury, Herbert Lom, Arthur Lowe, Ian Carmichael, Gerald Harper, Jenny Runacre, Jean Anderson, Madlena Nedeva, Madge Ryan, Rosalind Knight, Vladek Sheybal, Wolf Kahler, Barbara Markham, Peter Schratt	
O C T O B E R	31	Tess	Columbia Pictures	Roman Polanski (director/screenplay); Gérard Brach, John Brownjohn (screenplay); Nastassja Kinski, Peter Firth, Leigh Lawson, John Collin, Rosemary Martin, Carolyn Pickles, Richard Pearson, David Markham, Pascale de Boysson, Suzanna Hamilton, Caroline Embling, Tony Church, Sylvia Coleridge, Fred Bryant, Tom Chadbon, Arielle Dombasle, Dicken Ashworth, Lesley Dunlop	
N O V E M B E R	1	Natural Enemies	Utopia / Cinema 5 Distributing	Jeff Kanew (director/screenplay); Hal Holbrook, Louise Fletcher, Elizabeth Berridge, Peter Armstrong, Stephen Austin, Viveca Lindfors, José Ferrer, Jim Pappas, Ellen Barber, John Bartholomew, Lisa Carroll, Patricia Elliott, Patricia Mauceri, Casey Kanew	
N O V E M B E R	2	Bear Island	United Artists / Selkirk Films / Canadian Film Development Corporation / Bear Island Films	Don Sharp (director/screenplay); David Butler, Murray Smith (screenplay); Donald Sutherland, Vanessa Redgrave, Richard Widmark, Christopher Lee, Lloyd Bridges, Bruce Greenwood, Barbara Parkins, Patricia Collins, Mark Jones, August Schellenberg, Candace O'Connor, Michael Collins, Michael J. Reynolds, Lawrence Dane, Hagan Beggs, Nicholas Cortland, Joseph Golland, Richard Wren, Robert Stelmach, Terry Waterhouse	
N O V E M B E R	2	Promises in the Dark	Orion Pictures	Jerome Hellman (director); Loring Mandel (screenplay); Marsha Mason, Ned Beatty, Susan Clark, Michael Brandon, Kathleen Beller, Paul Clemens, Donald Moffat, Philip Sterling, Bonnie Bartlett, James Noble, Peggy McCay, Fran Bennett, Arthur Rosenberg, Robert Doran, Lenora May, Alexandra Johnson, Eloise Hardt, Bernie Kuby, Karen Anders, Edith Fields, Alice Beardsley	
N O V E M B E R	2	Quadrophenia	World-Northal Corporation / The Who Films Ltd	Franc Roddam (director/screenplay); Dave Humphries, Martin Stellman, Pete Townshend (screenplay); Phil Daniels, Leslie Ash, Toyah Willcox, Philip Davis, Mark Wingett, Sting, Ray Winstone, Gary Shail, Garry Cooper, Trevor Laird, Andy Sayce, Kate Williams, Michael Elphick, Kim Neve, Benjamin Whitrow, Daniel Peacock, Jeremy Child, John Phillips, Timothy Spall, Patrick Murray, George Innes, John Bindon, P. H. Moriarty, Hugh Lloyd, Gary Holton, John Altman, Jesse Birdsall, Olivier Pierre, Julian Firth, Simon Gipps-Kent, Mickey Royce, Dave Cash, John Blundell	
N O V E M B E R	2	Running	Universal Pictures	Steven Hilliard Stern (director/screenplay); Michael Douglas, Susan Anspach, Chuck Shamata, Eugene Levy, Philip Akin, Gordon Clapp, Lawrence Dane, Lesleh Donaldson, Robin Duke, David Eisner, Giancarlo Esposito, Marvin Goldhar, Jim McKay, Tony Rosato, Murray Westgate, Trudy Young, Robert Hannah, Shawn Lawrence, Jennifer McKinney, Monica Parker	
N O V E M B E R	6	Don Giovanni	New Yorker Films	Joseph Losey (director/screenplay); Rolf Liebermann, Patricia Losey, Renzo Rossellini, Frantz Salieri (screenplay); Ruggero Raimondi, John Macurdy, Edda Moser, Kiri Te Kanawa, Kenneth Riegel, José van Dam, Teresa Berganza, Malcolm King, Eric Adjani	
N O V E M B E R	6	The Fish That Saved Pittsburgh	United Artists / Lorimar Productions	Gilbert Moses (director); Jaison Starkes, Edmond Stevens (screenplay); Julius Erving, Jonathan Winters, Meadowlark Lemon, Jack Kehoe, Margaret Avery, James Bond III, Michael V. Gazzo, Peter Isacksen, Dwayne Mooney, Daryl Mooney, Nicholas Pryor, M. Emmet Walsh, Stockard Channing, Flip Wilson, Debbie Allen, Dee Dee Bridgewater, Julius Carry, Jerry Chambers, Jessie Lawrence Ferguson, Clayton Hill, Eric Mercury, Branscombe Richmond, Joe Seneca, Harry Shearer, Marv Albert, Chick Hearn, The Sylvers, The Spinners, Jerry Tarkanian, Ron Carter, Connie Hawkins, Lou Hudson, Kareem Abdul-Jabbar, Luther Rackley, Norm Nixon, Alfred Beard Jr., Luther "Ticky" Burden, Spencer Haywood, Lonnie Shelton, Mychal Thompson, John Williamson, Donald Chaney, Cedric "Cornbread" Maxwell, Kevin Stacom, Curtis Lowe, Leon Douglas, Christopher J. Ford, Bob Lanier, John Shumate, Eric Money, Kevin Porter	
N O V E M B E R	7	The Rose	20th Century Fox	Mark Rydell (director); Bo Goldman, Bill Kirby (screenplay); Bette Midler, Alan Bates, Frederic Forrest, Harry Dean Stanton, Barry Primus, David Keith, Sandra McCabe, Will Hare, James Keane, Doris Roberts, Danny Weis, Mark Leonard, Steve Hunter, Sylvester, Michael Greer	
N O V E M B E R	8	Eagle's Wing	Rank Film Distributors / Peter Shaw Productions	Anthony Harvey (director); John Briley (screenplay); Martin Sheen, Sam Waterston, Harvey Keitel, Stéphane Audran, John Castle, Caroline Langrishe, Jorge Russek, Manuel Ojeda, Jorge Luke, Pedro Damian, Claudio Brook, José Carlos Ruiz, Farnesio de Bernal, Cecilia Camacho, Enrique Lucero	
N O V E M B E R	14	All Quiet on the Western Front	CBS / Norman Rosemont Productions / Marble Arch Productions / ITC Entertainment	Delbert Mann (director); Paul Monash (screenplay); Richard Thomas, Ernest Borgnine, Donald Pleasence, Ian Holm, Patricia Neal, Mark Elliott, Dai Bradley, Dominic Jephcott, Ewan Stewart, Michael Sheard, Mary Miller, Matthew Evans, George Winter, Mark Drewry, Colin Mayes, Katerina Lirova	
N O V E M B E R	14	Boardwalk	Atlantic Releasing Corporation / Stratford Travellers Films	Stephen Verona (director/screenplay); Leigh Chapman (screenplay); Ruth Gordon, Lee Strasberg, Janet Leigh, Joe Silver, Eddie Barth, Teri Keane, Eli Mintz, Lillian Roth, Altovise Davis, Merwin Goldsmith, Michael Ayr, Forbesy Russell, Chevi Colton, Rashel Novikoff, Kim Delgado	
N O V E M B E R	14	The Silent Scream	American Cinema Releasing / Speculator Productions	Denny Harris (director/screenplay); Ken Wheat, Jim Wheat, Wallace E. Bennett (screenplay); Rebecca Balding, Barbara Steele, Cameron Mitchell, Yvonne De Carlo, Avery Schreiber, John Widelock, Steve Doubet, Brad Rearden, Juli Andelman, Jack Stryker, Thelma Pelish, Tina Tyler, Jason Zahler	
N O V E M B E R	17	Salem's Lot	CBS / Warner Bros. Television Distribution	Tobe Hooper (director); Paul Monash (screenplay); David Soul, James Mason, Lance Kerwin, Bonnie Bedelia, Lew Ayres, Ed Flanders, Fred Willard, Julie Cobb, Kenneth McMillan, Geoffrey Lewis, Barney McFadden, Marie Windsor, Bonnie Bartlett, George Dzundza, Elisha Cook Jr., Clarissa Kaye, Ned Wilson, Barbara Babcock, Joshua Bryant, James Gallery, Reggie Nalder, Brad Savage, Ronnie Scribner	
N O V E M B E R	21	Mountain Family Robinson	Pacific International Enterprises	John Cotter (director); Arthur R. Dubs (screenplay); Robert Logan, Susan Damante-Shaw, Heather Rattray, Ham Larsen, George Buck Flower, William Bryant	
N O V E M B E R	21	The Visitor	American International Pictures / The International Picture Show Company / Brouwersgracht Investments / Film Ventures International / Swan American Film	Giulio Paradisi (director); Luciano Comici, Robert Mundi (screenplay); John Huston, Mel Ferrer, Glenn Ford, Lance Henriksen, Shelley Winters, Joanne Nail, Sam Peckinpah, Paige Conner, Neal Boortz, Steve Somers, Kareem Abdul-Jabbar, Franco Nero	
N O V E M B E R	23	Birth of the Beatles		Richard Marquand (director); John Kurland, Jacob Eskendar (screenplay); Stephen MacKenna, Rod Culbertson, John Altman, Ray Ashcroft, Ryan Michael, David Nicholas Wilkinson, Brian Jameson, Wendy Morgan, Gary Olsen, Linal Haft, Eileen Kennally, Richard Marner, Alyson Spiro, Nigel Havers, Paula Jacobs	
N O V E M B E R	23	Yesterday's Hero	Columbia Pictures	Neil Leifer (director); Jackie Collins (screenplay); Ian McShane, Suzanne Somers, Adam Faith, Paul Nicholas, Sam Kydd, Glynis Barber, Trevor Thomas, Sandy Ratcliff, Alan Lake, Matthew Long, Paul J. Medford, Paul Desbois, Eric Deacon, George Moon, Jack Haig, Damian Elwes, Cary Elwes, John Motson	
D E C E M B E R	7	Love and Bullets	Associated Film Distribution / ITC Entertainment	Stuart Rosenberg (director); Wendell Mayes, John Melson (screenplay); Charles Bronson, Jill Ireland, Rod Steiger, Henry Silva, Strother Martin, Bradford Dillman, Michael V. Gazzo, Paul Koslo, Val Avery, Sam Chew Jr., Billy Gray, Jerome Thor, Joseph Roman, Albert Salmi, John Hallam, Sidney Kean, Lorraine Chase	
D E C E M B E R	7	Star Trek: The Motion Picture	Paramount Pictures	Robert Wise (director); Harold Livingston (screenplay); William Shatner, Leonard Nimoy, DeForest Kelley, James Doohan, George Takei, Majel Barrett, Walter Koenig, Nichelle Nichols, Persis Khambatta, Stephen Collins, Grace Lee Whitney, David Gautreaux, Mark Lenard	
D E C E M B E R	7	Wise Blood	New Line Cinema	John Huston (director); Benedict Fitzgerald, Michael Fitzgerald (screenplay); Brad Dourif, Ned Beatty, Harry Dean Stanton, Dan Shor, Amy Wright, Mary Nell Santacroce, John Huston, William Hickey, J.L. Parker, Marvin Sapp, Betty Lou Groover	
D E C E M B E R	14	1941	Universal Pictures	Steven Spielberg (director); Robert Zemeckis, Bob Gale (screenplay); Dan Aykroyd, Ned Beatty, John Belushi, Lorraine Gary, Murray Hamilton, Christopher Lee, Tim Matheson, Toshirō Mifune, Warren Oates, Robert Stack, Treat Williams, Penny Marshall, Nancy Allen, Bobby Di Cicco, Eddie Deezen, Walter Olkewicz, Dianne Kay, Slim Pickens, Kerry Sherman, Wendie Jo Sperber, John Candy, John Voldstad, Perry Lang, Geno Silva, Patti LuPone, Whitney Rydbeck, Lucinda Dooling, Frank McRae, Steven Mond, Dub Taylor, Luis Contreras, Lionel Stander, Michael McKean, Susan Backlinie, David L. Lander, Joe Flaherty, Don Calfa, Ignatius Wolfington, Lucille Benson, Elisha Cook Jr., Hiroshi Shimizu, Rita Taggart, Maureen Teefy, Akio Mitamura, Mickey Rourke, Samuel Fuller, Audrey Landers, John Landis, Dick Miller, Donovan Scott, Andy Tennant, Jack Thibeau, Jerry Hardin, Robert Houston, James Caan, Sydney Lassick, Debbie Rothstein	
D E C E M B E R	14	Chapter Two	Columbia Pictures / Rastar	Robert Moore (director); Neil Simon (screenplay); James Caan, Marsha Mason, Valerie Harper, Joseph Bologna, Alan Fudge, Judy Farrell, Debra Mooney, Isabel Cooley, Imogene Bliss, Barry Michlin, Ray Young, Greg Zadikov, Dr. Paul Singh, Sumant, Cheryl Blanchi	
D E C E M B E R	14	The Jerk	Universal Pictures / Aspen Film Society	Carl Reiner (director); Steve Martin, Carl Gottlieb, Michael Elias (screenplay); Steve Martin, Bernadette Peters, M. Emmet Walsh, Jackie Mason, Dick O'Neill, Mabel King, Richard Ward, Bill Macy, Catlin Adams, Maurice Evans, Helena Carroll, Ren Woods, Carl Gottlieb, Frances E. Williams, Carl Reiner, Dick Anthony Williams, Sharon Johansen, Alfred Dennis, Rob Reiner, Larry Hankin	
D E C E M B E R	14	The War at Home	New Front Films / Catalyst Films / Wisconsin Educational Television Network	Glenn Silber, Barry Alexander Brown (directors); Blake Kellogg	
D E C E M B E R	19	Being There	United Artists / Lorimar Productions	Hal Ashby (director); Jerzy Kosiński (screenplay); Peter Sellers, Shirley MacLaine, Jack Warden, Melvyn Douglas, Richard Dysart, Richard Basehart, Than Wyenn, David Clennon, Fran Brill, Ruth Attaway, Denise DuBarry, Sam Weisman, Alice Hirson, Arthur Rosenberg, Jerome Hellman, James Noble, John Harkins, Elya Baskin, Richard McKenzie, Oteil Burbridge, Hoyt Clark Harris Jr.	
D E C E M B E R	19	The Human Factor	United Artists	Otto Preminger (director); Tom Stoppard (screenplay); Richard Attenborough, John Gielgud, Derek Jacobi, Robert Morley, Ann Todd, Nicol Williamson, Iman, Joop Doderer, Richard Vernon, Angela Thorne, Fiona Fullerton, Tony Haygarth, Tony Vogel, Martin Benson, Marianne Stone, Tom Chatto, Adrienne Corri, Sylvia Coleridge, Frank Williams	
D E C E M B E R	19	Kramer vs. Kramer	Columbia Pictures	Robert Benton (director/screenplay); Dustin Hoffman, Meryl Streep, Jane Alexander, Justin Henry, Howard Duff, George Coe, JoBeth Williams, Howland Chamberlain, Petra King, Melissa Morell, Dan Tyra	
D E C E M B E R	19	Roller Boogie	United Artists / Compass International Pictures	Mark L. Lester (director); Barry Schneider (screenplay); Linda Blair, Jim Bray, Albert Insinnia, Jimmy Van Patten, Kimberly Beck, Stoney Jackson, Beverly Garland, Mark Goddard	
D E C E M B E R	20	All That Jazz	20th Century Fox	Bob Fosse (director/screenplay); Robert Alan Aurthur (screenplay); Roy Scheider, Jessica Lange, Ann Reinking, Leland Palmer, Cliff Gorman, Ben Vereen, Erzsébet Földi, Keith Gordon, David Margulies, Michael Tolan, Max Wright, William LeMassena, Deborah Geffner, John Lithgow, Jules Fisher, Chris Chase, Anthony Holland, Sandahl Bergman, Jennifer Nairn-Smith, Ben Masters, Robert Levine, CCH Pounder, Wallace Shawn, Tito Goya, Michael Hinton, Eileen Casey, Bruce Anthony Davis, Gary Flannery, Danny Ruvolo, Leland Schwantes, John Sowinski, Candace Tovar, Rima Vetter	
D E C E M B E R	21	Baby Snakes	Intercontinental Absurdities	Frank Zappa, Bruce Bickford (directors); Frank Zappa, Terry Bozzio, Roy Estrada, Adrian Belew, Ed Mann, Patrick O'Hearn, Peter Wolf, Tommy Mars	
D E C E M B E R	21	The Black Hole	Walt Disney Productions / Buena Vista Distribution	Gary Nelson (director); Gerry Day, Jeb Rosebrook (screenplay); Maximilian Schell, Anthony Perkins, Robert Forster, Joseph Bottoms, Yvette Mimieux, Ernest Borgnine, Roddy McDowall, Slim Pickens, Tom McLoughlin	
D E C E M B E R	21	Cuba	United Artists / Holmby Pictures	Richard Lester (director); Charles Wood (screenplay); Sean Connery, Brooke Adams, Jack Weston, Héctor Elizondo, Denholm Elliott, Martin Balsam, Chris Sarandon, Alejandro Rey, Lonette McKee, Danny De La Paz, Louisa Moritz, Dave King, Walter Gotell, David Rappaport, Wolfe Morris, Roger Lloyd-Pack, Maria Charles, Pauline Peart, Earl Cameron, John Morton, Stefan Kalipha, Ram John Holder, Willis Bouchey, Ana Obregón, Michael Lees, Tony Mathews, Leticia Garrido, Anna Nicholas, Anthony Pullen Shaw, Raul Newney, James Turner	
D E C E M B E R	21	C.H.O.M.P.S.	American International Pictures / Hanna-Barbera Productions	Don Chaffey (director); Joseph Barbera, Duane Poole, Dick Robbins (screenplay); Wesley Eure, Valerie Bertinelli, Conrad Bain, Chuck McCann, Red Buttons, Hermione Baddeley, Jim Backus	
D E C E M B E R	21	The Electric Horseman	Universal Pictures / Columbia Pictures / Wildwood Enterprises / Rastar Films	Sydney Pollack (director); Paul Gaer, Robert Garland (screenplay); Robert Redford, Jane Fonda, Valerie Perrine, Willie Nelson, John Saxon, Nicolas Coster, Allan Arbus, Wilford Brimley, Will Hare, Basil Hoffman, Timothy Scott, James B. Sikking	
D E C E M B E R	21	Scavenger Hunt	20th Century Fox / Melvin Simon Productions	Michael Schultz (director); Steven A. Vail, Henry Harper (screenplay); Richard Benjamin, James Coco, Scatman Crothers, Ruth Gordon, Cloris Leachman, Cleavon Little, Roddy McDowall, Robert Morley, Richard Mulligan, Tony Randall, Dirk Benedict, Willie Aames, Stephanie Faracy, Stephen Furst, Richard Masur, Meat Loaf, Pat McCormick, Vincent Price, Avery Schreiber, Arnold Schwarzenegger, Liz Torres, Carol Wayne, Stuart Pankin, Maureen Teefy, Missy Francis, Julie Anne Haddock, Henry Polic II, Emory Bass, David Hollander, Shane Sinutko, Hal Landon Jr., Marji Martin, Jerado Decordovier, Byron Webster	
D E C E M B E R	25	Going in Style	Warner Bros.	Martin Brest (director/screenplay); George Burns, Art Carney, Lee Strasberg, Charles Hallahan, Pamela Payton-Wright, Siobhan Keegan, Brian Neville	

== See also ==
- List of 1979 box office number-one films in the United States
- 1979 in the United States
