= Kansas (film) =

1988 film by David Stevens

- Cinema poster
- Directed by: David Stevens
- Written by: Spencer Eastman
- Produced by: George Litto
- Starring: Matt Dillon; Andrew McCarthy; Leslie Hope; Kyra Sedgwick; Arlen Dean Snyder
- Cinematography: David Eggby
- Edited by: Robert Barrere
- Music by: Pino Donaggio
- Distributed by: Trans World Entertainment
- Release dates: May 1988 (Cannes); September 23, 1988
- Running time: 108 minutes
- Country: United States
- Language: English
- Budget: $8 million
- Box office: $2,432,536

Kansas is a 1988 American crime drama film starring Matt Dillon and Andrew McCarthy.

== Plot ==
Wade Corey (Andrew McCarthy) is on his way to a friend's wedding in New York City when his car burns up in Utah, leaving him stranded. Without options, he hops a freight train where he's pulled onto a moving boxcar by Doyle Kennedy (Matt Dillon). Doyle tells Wade about himself and convinces him to accompany him to a small town in Kansas where Wade can get help and they can attend a local festival.

What Wade doesn't know he soon finds out: Doyle is planning to use the festival as a chance to rob the local bank. The two walk into the bank, and before Wade knows what's happening, there's a gun in his face. Doyle demands Wade help him. Doyle holds up the bank, knocking out the police watchman and tying up the bank attendant. Wade piles the money into a bag, and no one witnesses his part in the robbery. In their effort to get away the pair get split up. Wade successfully hides from sight with the money while Doyle is chased across the countryside

While the robbery is unfolding, the governor - who'd been giving a speech at the festival, sends his young daughter home with an aide after she gets a touch of heatstroke. The car gets a flat beside an old steel bridge where - high on adrenaline, Wade is busy tucking away the cash under the bridge. An eager cop comes speeding down the road in pursuit of the robbers and doesn't see the governor's car, hits it, and sends it into the river with the daughter inside. Forced by his conscience to help, Wade jumps from the bridge and carries the girl to shore, saving her from drowning. Nordquist, a local reporter (Alan Toy), snaps a photo of the moment, but the image doesn’t clearly show Wade’s face, and Wade runs off into the woods to avoid being identified.

Needing to hide out, Wade takes a job on a local ranch where he becomes romantically interested in the ranch owner’s daughter, Lori (Leslie Hope), though she has a boyfriend. Doyle goes through a series of scams and schemes to stay in the area; he doesn't want to be too high-profile but is bent on finding Wade and the money. He eventually signs on as a ride operator with a carnival traveling through town, where he finally spots Wade.

The two agree to meet the next night and reclaim the money, though Wade lies about the money’s exact location. Wade misses the meeting because he loses track of time while having sex with Lori. Doyle searches for the money by the bridge and is unable to find it.

Doyle hunts Wade down on the farm he's working at. Wade agrees to give Doyle the money but says he now wants an even cut as opposed to the one-third Doyle offered him. Doyle agrees and lights the barn on fire to force Wade to make their new meeting. The fire draws the local news and Nordquist, the reporter who snapped the photo of the 'Unknown Hero.’ He sees Wade and recognizes him, leading to him being identified and celebrated by the entire town as a hero. As the town prepares a large celebration in Wade’s honor, Doyle calls and threatens him, telling him that he better show up to their next meeting. Wade feels increasingly guilty about his role in the robbery and anxious about what Doyle may do to those on the ranch. He confesses to Lori about his involvement in the robbery. She believes him when he tells her that he was forced by Doyle to participate and thinks others will believe him too.

Doyle breaks into Nordquist’s house who, after recognizing Wade, wrote the story about him being a hero. Doyle tells him that Wade was involved in the robbery and ran off with all the money in an attempt to ruin the life Wade established for himself at the ranch. Nordquist refuses to believe Doyle but upon going through the pictures he’s taken, discovers a photo of Wade and Doyle together at the festival just before the bank was robbed. He begins to write a story revealing Wade’s involvement in the robbery.

Wade meets with Doyle as planned, and the pair go to the bridge to retrieve the money. Doyle is upset to discover that Wade lied to him about the actual location of the money and goes to shoot him. Wade knocks the gun away and the two fight. Eventually, Wade gets the gun and points it at Doyle as he picks up the bags filled with money. Doyle dares Wade to shoot him, but he instead throws the gun into the river, letting Doyle leave with all the money. Wade returns to the ranch.

Doyle is recognized by police as the bank robber at a local gas station as he makes his escape. After he drives off, he discovers the police have formed a blockade, forcing him to turn around in the middle of the road. Doyle is met by more police cars blocking the other end of the road and drives at them as they shoot at the car. He decides to let them kill him, and the car flips after he is shot repeatedly, wrecking on the side of the road. Doyle crawls out of the car covered in blood and dies.

As part of the town’s celebration for Wade, he is to receive a medal honoring his bravery from the governor. Just as the ceremony is about to begin, Lori’s father calls it off, telling the governor that Wade is not coming—he and Lori have run off together. The reporter, Nordquist, is also at the ceremony and learns of this and as everyone is leaving, is told by an officer that Doyle was apprehended and killed. The officer tells him that Doyle had all the money stolen from the bank. After the officer walks away, Nordquist pulls the draft of the story revealing Wade’s involvement in the robbery out of his jacket. He smiles as he shreds it, now knowing that Wade is of good moral character.

Lori drives Wade to the train tracks so he can return home, and they discuss the possibility of their romance. Lori tells Wade that it can’t work if he is going to be leaving all the time. A train drives by and Wade jumps aboard, waving goodbye to Lori. He realizes that he can’t leave her and jumps back off the train. Lori rushes to Wade, and the two kiss.

== Cast ==
- Matt Dillon as Doyle Kennedy
- Andrew McCarthy as Wade Corey
- Leslie Hope as Lori Bayles
- Kyra Sedgwick as Prostitute Drifter
- Arlen Dean Snyder as George Bayles
- Alan Toy as Nelson Nordquist
- Harry Northup as The Governor
- Andy Romano as Fleener
- Brent Jennings as "Buckshot"
- Brynn Thayer as Connie
- Clint Allen as Ted
- Bret Pearson as Alvin
- Joseph R. Scrivo as Rodríguez
- Ken Boehr as Ferson
- T. Max Graham as Mr. Kennedy
- Mimi Wickliff as Mrs. Bayles
- Louis Giambalvo as Army Sergeant

== Production ==
Screenwriter Spencer Eastman had never been to Kansas when he wrote the script. It was optioned in 1984 by George Litto. It became Litto's first film in a five film, 2 year, deal with Trans World Entertainment.

Filming took place on location in Kansas, based out of Lawrence in October 1987. Wheat harvest footage was shot in North Dakota. There was also filming in the town of Valley Falls.

"I kinda hung around some of the dingy bars in Kansas, talked with the people there," said Dillon, adding the film was " about America, the heart of America. We're doing this movie in Kansas. And that's what this movie is about. People will say to me, `I heard this film is making fun of Kansas.' God, I hope not. Because, then, it will be making fun of me."

"It's . . . different," said McCarthy. "Nice place to hide out for a while. I don't want to pack up and move here, but it's okay for ten weeks."

One local resident said the film "makes us all look like bumpkins straight out of `Little House on the Prairie.' "

== Release ==
The film was screened at the 1988 Cannes Film Festival in May 1988.

== Reception ==
On Rotten Tomatoes, the film holds an approval rating of 18% based on 11 reviews, with an average rating of 3.8/10. On Metacritic the film has a weighted average score of 35 out of 100, based on 8 critics, indicating "generally unfavorable" reviews.

Roger Ebert and Gene Siskel both gave it thumbs down, saying that the plot was recycled from Horatio Alger novels. Hollywood Video said it was uneven, although Matt Dillon's performance was given good reviews.

Screenwriter Spencer Eastman was diagnosed with terminal lung cancer in October 1987, and he died six months later.
