= George Litto =

American film producer and talent agent (1930–2019)

- Born: December 9, 1930; Philadelphia, Pennsylvania, U.S.
- Died: April 29, 2019 (aged 88); Los Angeles, California, U.S.
- Education: Temple University
- Occupations: Film producer, talent agent

George Litto (December 9, 1930 – April 29, 2019) was an American film producer and talent agent. His production credits included Robert Altman's Thieves Like Us (1974), Jonathan Kaplan's Over the Edge (1979), and three Brian De Palma films, Obsession (1976), Dressed to Kill (1980) and Blow Out (1981).

== Biography ==
Litto was born in Philadelphia, and graduated with a business degree from Temple University. He worked as an assistant at William Morris Agency in 1954, eventually repping Mae West.

In 1965, he started his own agency in Los Angeles, where he specialized in repping screenwriters who had previously been blacklisted. His clients included Waldo Salt, Dalton Trumbo, Ring Lardner Jr., Michael Wilson, Abraham Polonsky, Joseph Losey, Arnold Perl and Hawaii Five-O creator Leonard Freeman. In the following decade, he repped both Robert Altman and Brian De Palma, and would become a producer for their films.

Litto died at Cedars-Sinai Medical Center in Los Angeles from aortic stenosis. He was survived by his ex-wife and two daughters.

== Filmography ==
Year	Title	Functioned as		Director	Notes
Year	Title	Producer	Executive Producer	Director	Notes
1967	Pot au feu	Yes	No	Robert Altman	Short
1974	Thieves Like Us	No	Yes	Robert Altman	
1976	Drive-In	No	Yes	Rod Amateau	
1976	Obsession	Yes	No	Brian De Palma	
1979	Over the Edge	Yes	No	Jonathan Kaplan	
1980	Dressed to Kill	Yes	No	Brian De Palma	
1981	Blow Out	Yes	No	Brian De Palma	
1988	Kansas	Yes	No	David Stevens	
1989	Night Game	Yes	No	Peter Masterson	
2000	The Crew	No	Yes	Michael Dinner	
