= Harry Northup =

American actor and poet (born 1940)

Harry E. Northup
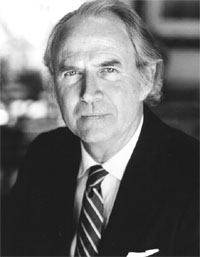
- Harry Northup
- Born: September 2, 1940 (age 85); Amarillo, Texas, U.S.
- Occupations: Actor, poet
- Years active: 1949–present

Harry E. Northup (born September 2, 1940) is an American actor and poet. As an actor, he made frequent appearances in the films of Martin Scorsese, Jonathan Demme and Jonathan Kaplan.

== Early life and education ==
Northup was born in Amarillo, Texas. He lived in 17 places by age 17, but mostly in Sidney, Nebraska, where he graduated from high school in 1958. From 1958 to 1961 he served in the United States Navy, where he attained the rank of Second Class Radioman. From 1963 to 1968, he studied Method acting with Frank Corsaro in New York City.

Northup received his B.A. in English from California State University, Northridge, where he studied poetry with Ann Stanford.

== Career ==
Northup has made a living as an actor for over 30 years and has been in 37 films, including Martin Scorsese's first six feature films: Who's That Knocking at My Door, Boxcar Bertha, Mean Streets, Alice Doesn't Live Here Anymore, Taxi Driver and New York, New York. He was Mr. Bimmel in Jonathan Demme's film The Silence of the Lambs and starred in Over the Edge and Fighting Mad.

Northup has been a member of the Academy of Motion Picture Arts and Sciences since 1976. Poets such as Walt Whitman, Leland Hickman, Paul Blackburn, Ann Stanford, William Carlos Williams, and Holly Prado have influenced Northup's poetry. He conceived and coordinated the weekly poetry reading series "Poetry on Melrose" at Gasoline Alley in Los Angeles, from 1986 to 1988. Poets who read at the venue include Robert Peters, Jack Hirschman and Lewis MacAdams.

== Personal life ==
Northup's second wife, poet and novelist Holly Prado, died on June 14, 2019. He has a son, Dylan, by his first marriage.

== Honors ==
The City of Los Angeles, as represented by the L.A. City Council, awarded Northup a Certificate of Recognition on November 15, 2006.

== Poetry ==
- Amarillo Born, Victor Jiminez Press, 1966
- The Jon Voight Poems, Mt. Averno Press, 1973
- Eros Ash, Momentum Press, 1976
- Enough The Great Running Chapel, Momentum Press, 1982
- The Images We Possess Kill The Capturing, Jesse Press, 1988
- The Ragged Vertical, Cahuenga Press, 1996
- Reunions, Cahuenga Press, 2001
- Greatest Hits, 1966–2001, Pudding House Press, 2002
- Red Snow Fence, Cahuenga Press, 2006
- Where Bodies Again Recline, Cahuenga Press, 2011
- East Hollywood: Memorial To Reason, Cahuenga Press, 2015
- Love Poem to MPTF, Cahuenga Press, 2020
- To Ask For Love, Cahuenga Press, 2025

== Anthologies ==
- Venice Thirteen, Bayrock Press, 1971
- The Streets Inside: Ten Los Angeles Poets, Momentum Press, 1978
- Foreign Exchange, Biographics, 1979
- Poetry Loves Poetry, An Anthology of Los Angeles Poets, Momentum Press, 1985
- Gridlock: An anthology of Poetry About Southern California, Applezaba Press, 1990
- Grand Passion, The Poets of Los Angeles and Beyond, Red Wind Books, 1995
- Corners of the Mouth, A Celebration of Thirty Years at the Annual San Luis Obispo Poetry Festival, Deer Tree Press, 2014
- Wide Awake: Poets of Los Angeles and Beyond, Pacific Coast Poetry Series/Beyond Baroque Books, 2015
- Coiled Serpent, Poets Arising from the Cultural Quakes & Shifts of Los Angeles, Tia Chucha Press, 2016
- Beat Not Beat anthology, Moon Tide Press, 2022
- Poetry Goes To The Movies, Pacific Coast Poetry Series, 2025

== Audio ==
- Personal Crime, New Alliance Records, 1993
- Homes, New Alliance Records, 1995
- As Long As I Tell The Truth What Difference Does It Make To You – An Interview with Harry Northup, Alright, Dude Productions, 2010

== Filmography ==
Year	Title	Role	Notes
1967	Who's That Knocking at My Door	Harry	
1971	Alias Smith and Jones	Hank	TV Episode
1972	Boxcar Bertha	Deputy Sheriff Harvey Hall	
1973	Mean Streets	Soldier	
1973	The All-American Boy	Parker	
1974	Alice Doesn't Live Here Anymore	Joe & Jim's Bartender	
1974	Crazy Mama	FBI Agent	
1976	Fighting Mad	Sheriff Skerritt	starring role
1976	Two-Minute Warning	Lieber (The S.W.A.T. Team)	
1976	Taxi Driver	'Doughboy'	1976 Palme d'Or winner at Cannes
1977	New York, New York	'Alabama'	
1977	Handle With Care	The Red Baron	
1977	Which Way Is Up?	Chief Goon	
1978	Blue Collar	Hank	
1979	Over the Edge	Sergeant Doberman	starring role
1979	11th Victim	Officer Thorpe	
1980	Tom Horn	Thomas Burke	
1980	Used Cars	Carmine	
1982	The Day the Bubble Burst	Andrew Arvay	TV movie
1982	Knots Landing	Wayne Harkness	TV, recurring role
1984	Nickel Mountain	Frank	
1986	The Deliberate Stranger	Tom Hargreaves	TV MiniSeries
1986	North and South: Book II	Major	TV miniseries
1987	Project X	Congressman	
1988	Kansas	Governor Dellit	
1991	The Silence of the Lambs	Mr. Bimmel	1991 Oscar winner for Best Picture
1992	Unlawful Entry	McMurtry, Desk Sergeant	
1992	Hero	Mr. Fletcher	
1993	Philadelphia	Juror No. 6	
1994	Bad Girls	Preacher Sloan	
1994	Reform School Girl	Uncle Charlie	
1996	In Cold Blood	Minister	TV MiniSeries
1998	Beloved	Sheriff	
1998	Four Corners	Tom Brothers	TV series
1999	Brokedown Palace	Leon Smith	
2001	ER	Competency Evaluator	TV Episode
2002	The Court	Justice Fitzsimmons	TV, recurring role
2004	The Manchurian Candidate	Congressman Flores	
2014	That Guy Dick Miller	Himself	
2018	Carry Tiger to Mountain	Isaac Solomon	
