= Michael Eric Kramer =

American actor (born 1962)

- Born: December 18, 1962 (age 62)
- Occupation: Psychologist
- Years active: 1973–present

Michael Eric Kramer is a former American actor. He is best known as playing the main character "Carl" from the cult film Over the Edge which centers on teenage rebellion. He appeared in other films with very small parts, like Project X—which, like Over the Edge, was directed by Jonathan Kaplan—and Return to Horror High.

No longer acting, he is a clinical psychologist and currently works at the Manhattan Campus of the Veterans Health Administration Medical Center New York, on posttraumatic stress disorder therapy using virtual reality. He also is the father of twins.
