= Over the Edge (film) =

1979 film by Jonathan Kaplan

- Theatrical release poster
- Directed by: Jonathan Kaplan
- Written by: Charles S. Haas; Tim Hunter
- Produced by: George Litto
- Starring: Michael Kramer; Matt Dillon; Pamela Ludwig; Vincent Spano; Harry Northup; Tom Fergus
- Cinematography: Andrew Davis
- Edited by: Robert Barrere
- Music by: Sol Kaplan
- Distributed by: Orion Pictures (through Warner Bros.)
- Release date: May 18, 1979
- Running time: 95 minutes
- Country: United States
- Language: English
- Budget: $3 million

Over the Edge is a 1979 American coming-of-age drama directed by Jonathan Kaplan and released in May 1979. The film, based on actual events, had a limited theatrical release but has since achieved cult film status. It was Matt Dillon's film debut.

== Plot ==
In Colorado's planned community of New Granada, Carl, Richie, and Claude hang out at "The Rec", an adult-supervised venue where teenagers can socialize. One afternoon, as The Rec closes, Carl and Richie are confronted by Police Sergeant Doberman, who suspects them of perpetrating a freeway sniping incident, but after being questioned at the station, both are released to their parents. The next day Carl befriends Cory, a new arrival who mildly rejects Carl's suggestion that they date. That evening, after learning from his father of the community's plans to nix construction of an amusement center, he walks to a local park where he meets Richie and they head to a nearby house party. But when police arrive to squelch the fun by reminding them of the newly-imposed curfew, Carl walks home alone and is assaulted by Mark, the real instigator of the freeway sniping.

Meanwhile, Carl's father has been trying to interest out-of-town investors in New Grenada, but Carl thwarts his attempts by booby-trapping their car. Latcher, Carl, and Richie accompany Cory and other kids on a picnic. They take along a pistol that Cory stole during a break-in. For fun, they take turns shooting tin cans until they run out of ammo. Claude, recently arrested for possession of hash, explains that the local neighborhood pusher, a fellow student named Tip, sold it to him, but when Cory reveals Tip's recent coincidental arrest, the kids drop in and interrogate him, and he confesses that he told Doberman about giving Claude hash. Richie, Carl, and Claude dump him into a pond as Tip's mother watches in horror from a nearby tennis court. Her descriptions of Carl and the others lead to panic. Richie steals his mother's car an he and Carl flee. It all ends tragically as Doberman chases them down. Richie produces a gun and aims it at Doberman, who fires in self-defense. Richie dies.

Carl and Cory sleep in a sleeping bag together, and kiss. Later, Carl threatens someone with an air rifle. The next day, Carl sneaks home and overhears his mother on the phone discussing a community meeting at the school that night. Carl sneaks back out to notify his friends, and they decide to confront the parents there. But when police show up, locking their weapons inside their cars, the meeting turns into a nightmare. The kids chain the school's doors, light fireworks, and proceed to trash the parking lot. Then they break into patrol cars, pull out police shotguns, and blow up several vehicles, igniting fires all around. When reserve police finally arrive, the kids disperse. Doberman apprehends Carl, but Mark, the freeway sniper, shoots Doberman's car, causing it to crash and catch fire. Carl pulls himself free, leaving the unconscious Doberman inside the car to perish in the massive explosion. When next seen, Carl and others are being herded onto a school bus and driven away. From atop an overpass, Cory and Claude wave goodbye to Carl as the bus heads to a juvenile detention facility; Carl briefly smiles.

== Cast ==
- Michael Kramer as Carl Willat
- Matt Dillon as Richie White
- Pamela Ludwig as Cory
- Harry Northup as Sergeant Doberman
- Vincent Spano as Mark Perry
- Tom Fergus as Claude Zachary
- Tiger Thompson as Johnny Zachary
- Andy Romano as Fred Willat
- Ellen Geer as Sandra Willat
- Richard Jamison as Cole
- Julia Pomeroy as Julia
- Lane Smith as Sloan
- Eric Lalich as Tip
- Kim Kliner as Abby

== Production ==
The film was inspired by events described in a 1973 San Francisco Examiner article entitled "Mousepacks: Kids on a Crime Spree" by Bruce Koon and James A. Finefrock, which reported on young kids vandalizing property in Foster City, California. The middle-class planned community had an unusually high level of juvenile crime. Screenwriters Charles S. Haas and Tim Hunter began work shortly after the article's publication, including field research in the town itself where they interviewed some of the kids. Hunter said that the script accurately reflected the article with the exception of a more violent ending.

Orion Pictures helped finance the film; producer George Litto borrowed an additional $1 million. Director Jonathan Kaplan, who was just 30 when hired, took a documentary approach to filming and hired unknown actors. Among them was Matt Dillon, then age 14, whom the filmmakers discovered in a middle school in Westchester County, New York. This was Dillon's feature film debut. Shooting took place over 20 days in 1978 in the Colorado cities of Aurora and Greeley.

== Filming locations ==
The filming took place in Aurora, Colorado, and Greeley, Colorado. John Evans Junior High School was used as New Granada School and was razed in 2015. The east side of John Evans School, the cafeteria, the metal shop parking lot, the athletics storage building (not in the picture), the library, and the science classrooms were featured in the film. New Granada scenes were filmed around the Colorado city of Aurora, Colorado, as well as Cherry Creek State Park and Reservoir. Some filming locations were reminiscent to the California city of Foster City where similar events that happened in the movie took place. Children and adolescents ranging in age from 8 to 18 were responsible for tens of thousands of dollars in damage to public buildings and infrastructure during a short period in 1972. The film is loosely based on the Foster City incident.

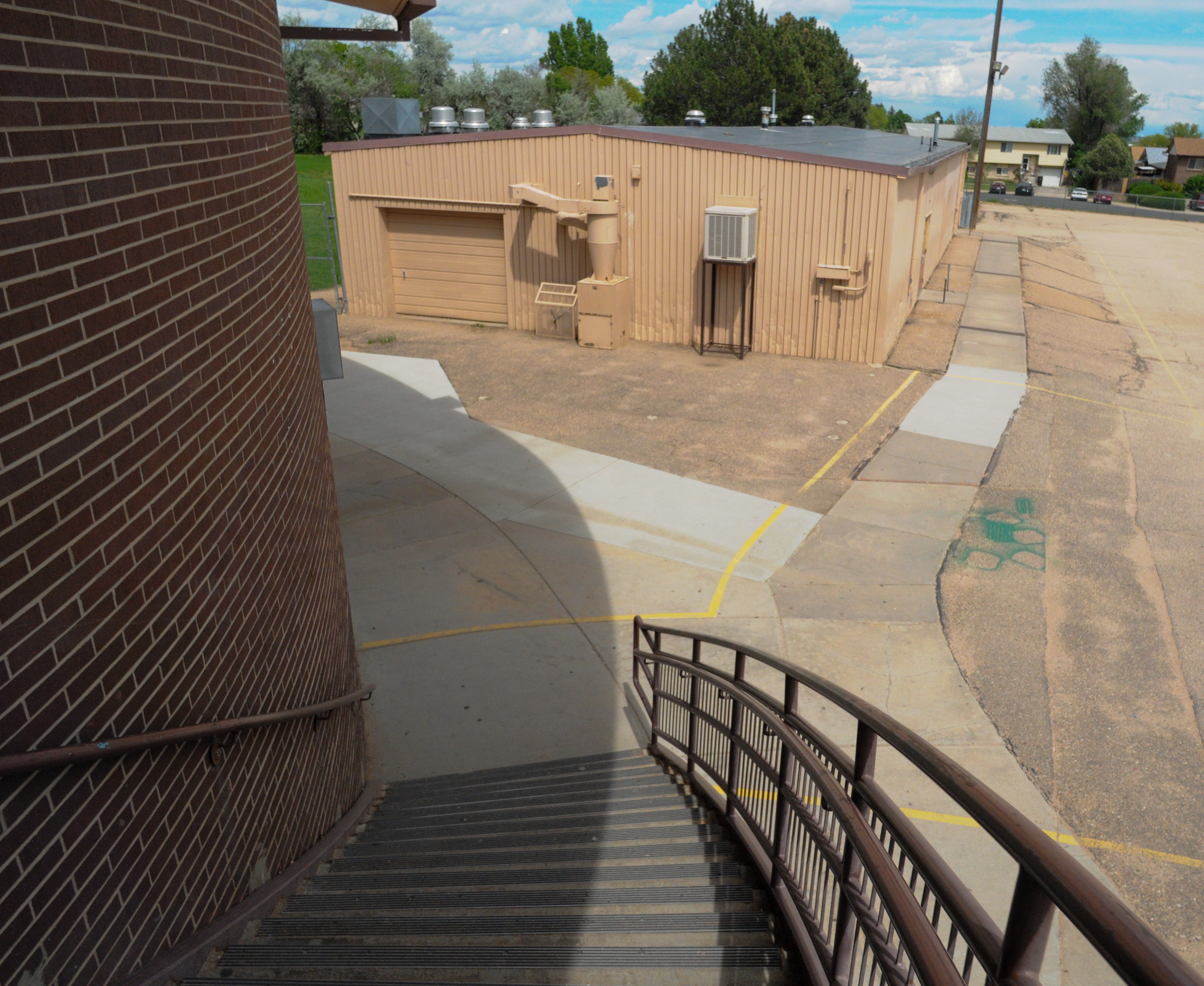
Cafetorium to Parking Lot Stairs. Carl and Richie were shown running up these stairs in one portion of the film

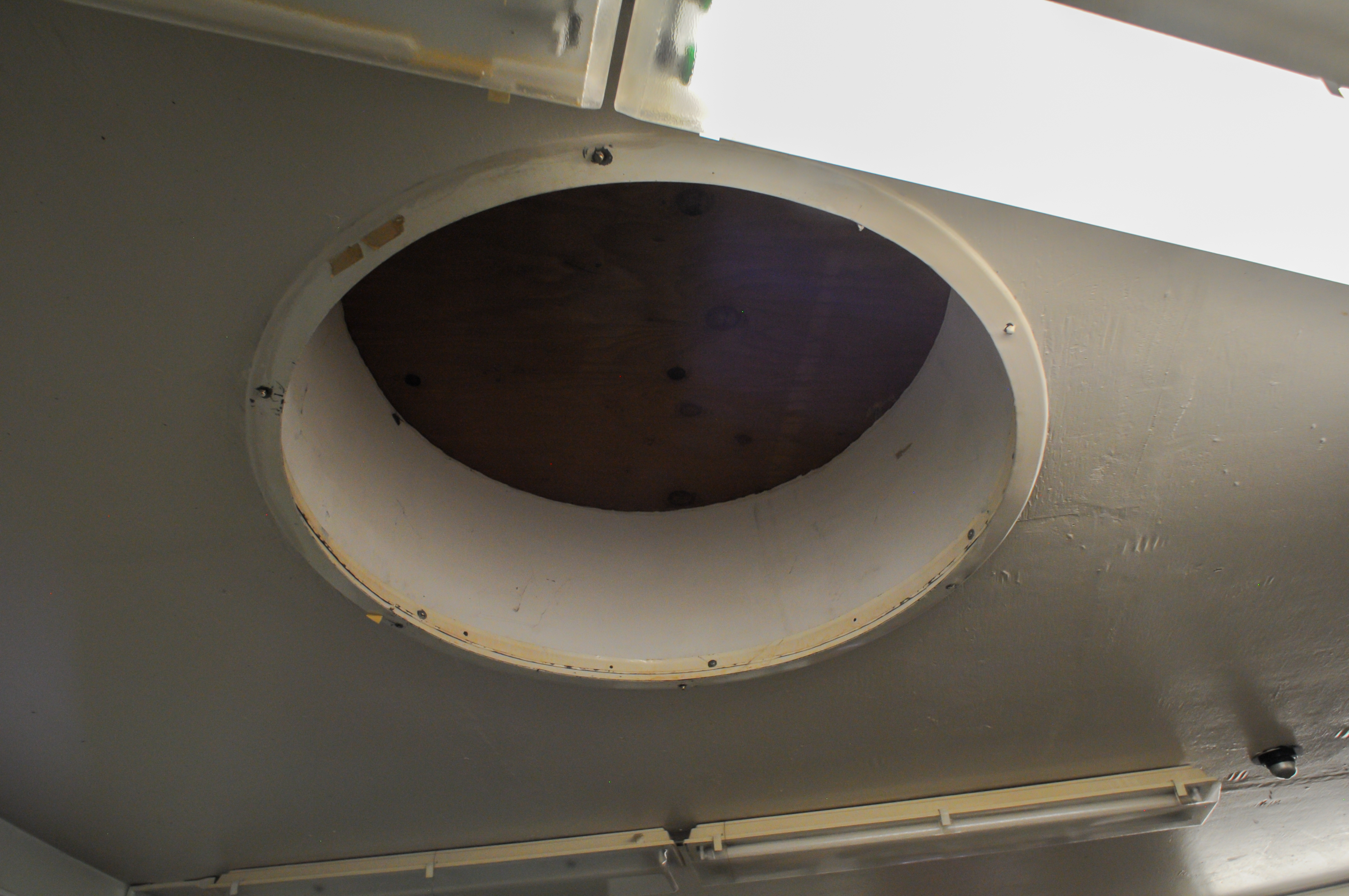
Science Room Skylight. This is where Carl broke into the school in the latter part of the film

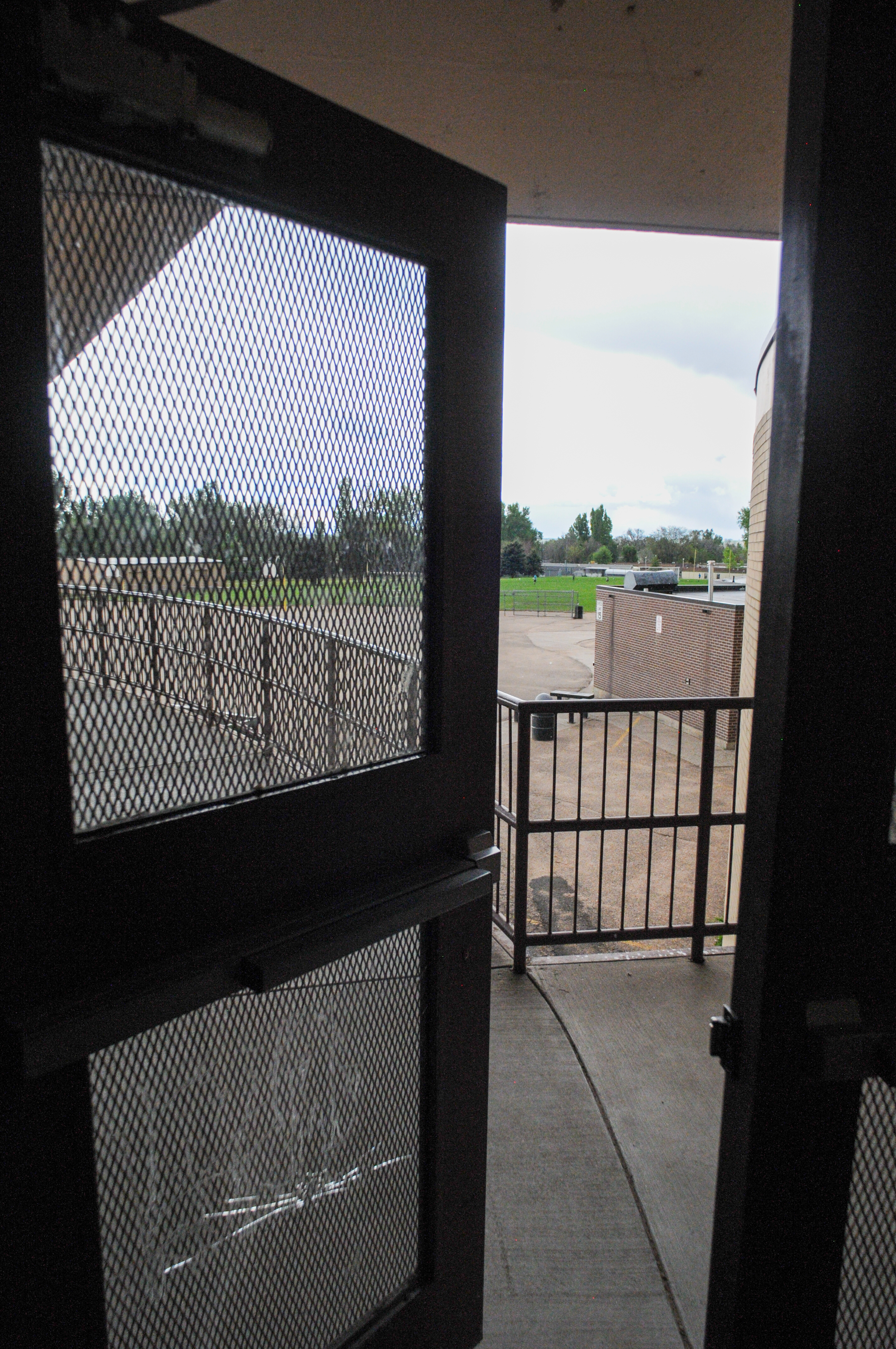
Cafetorium Doors. These were chained from the outside and this is where Sgt. Doberman views the teens on the other side

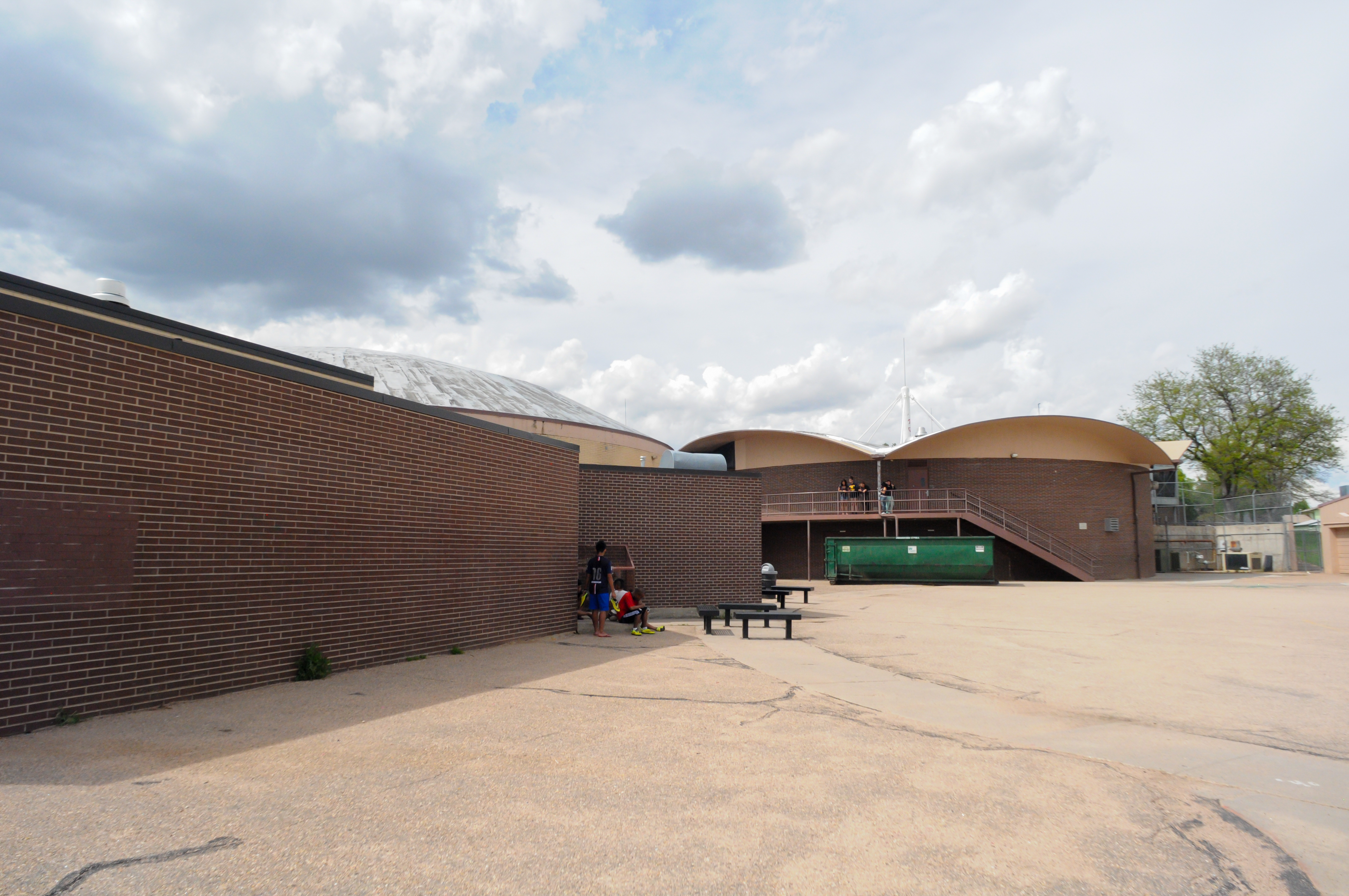
Parking Lot. This was the front of New Granada School, which is actually the back of the school where it was filmed.

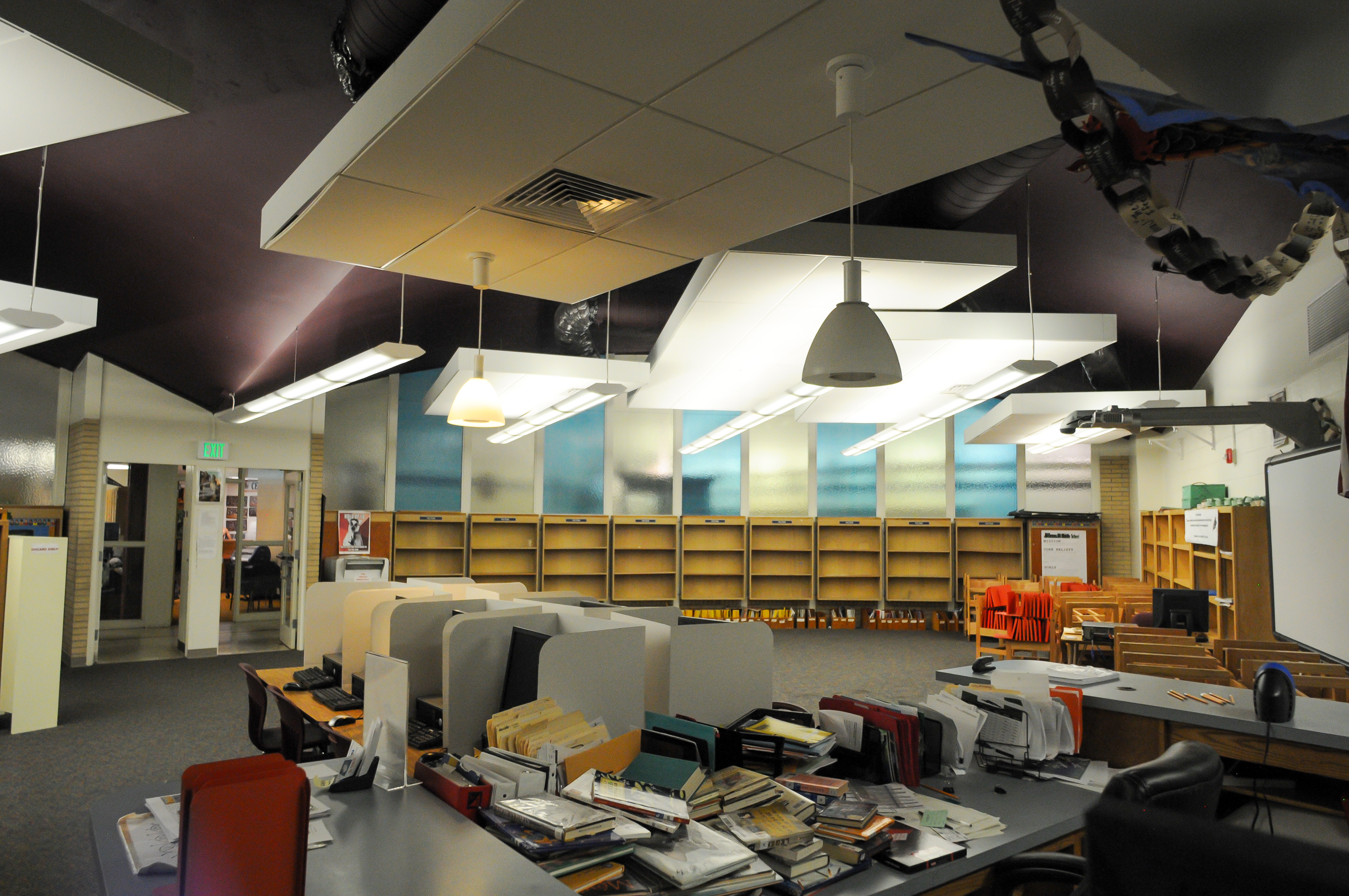
Library. This is one of the rooms that was destroyed by the teens after they broke into the school when the parents were locked in the Cafetorium

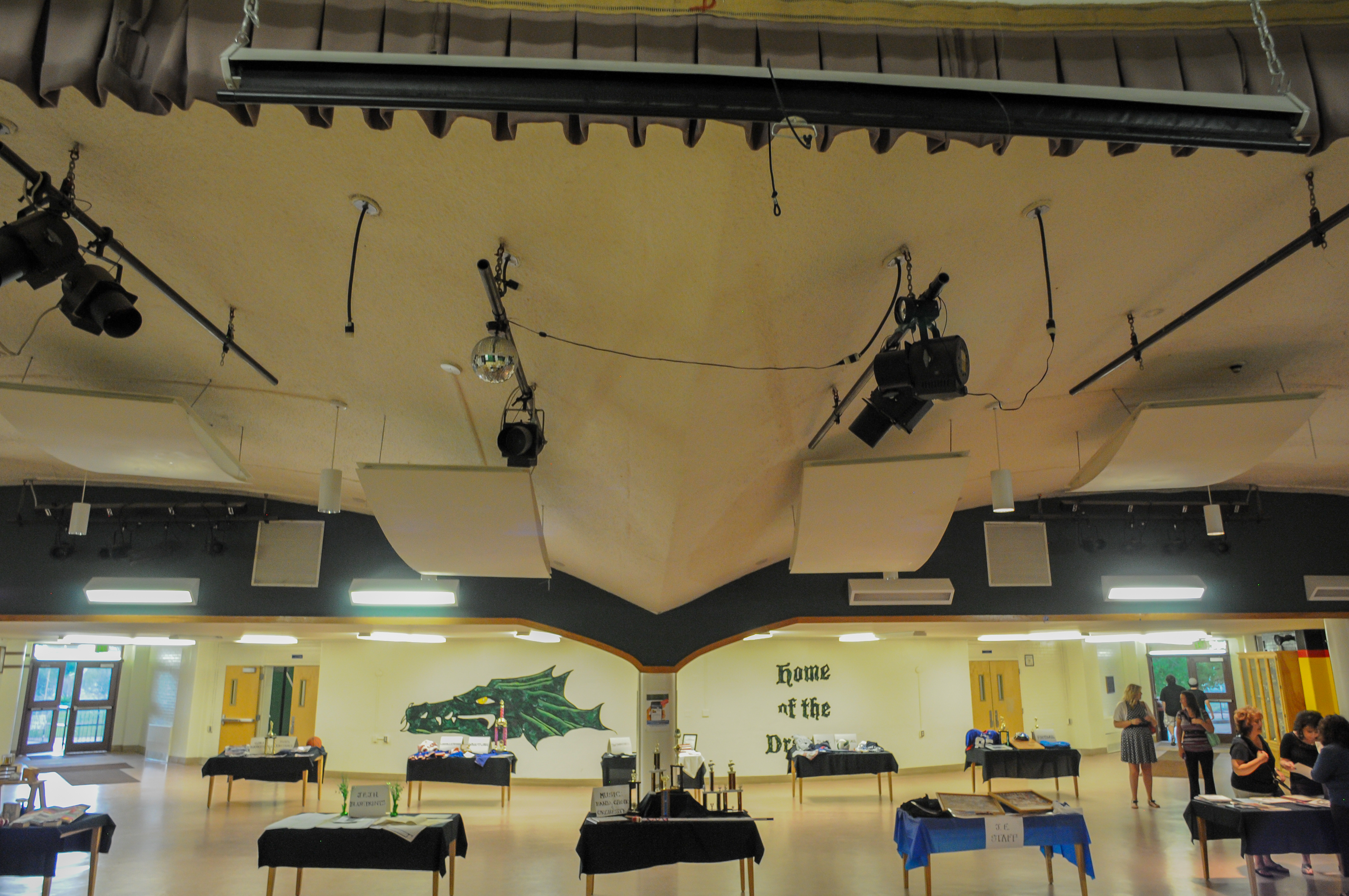
Cafetorium Stage. This is the View Sgt. Doberman had when speaking to the parents before riot.

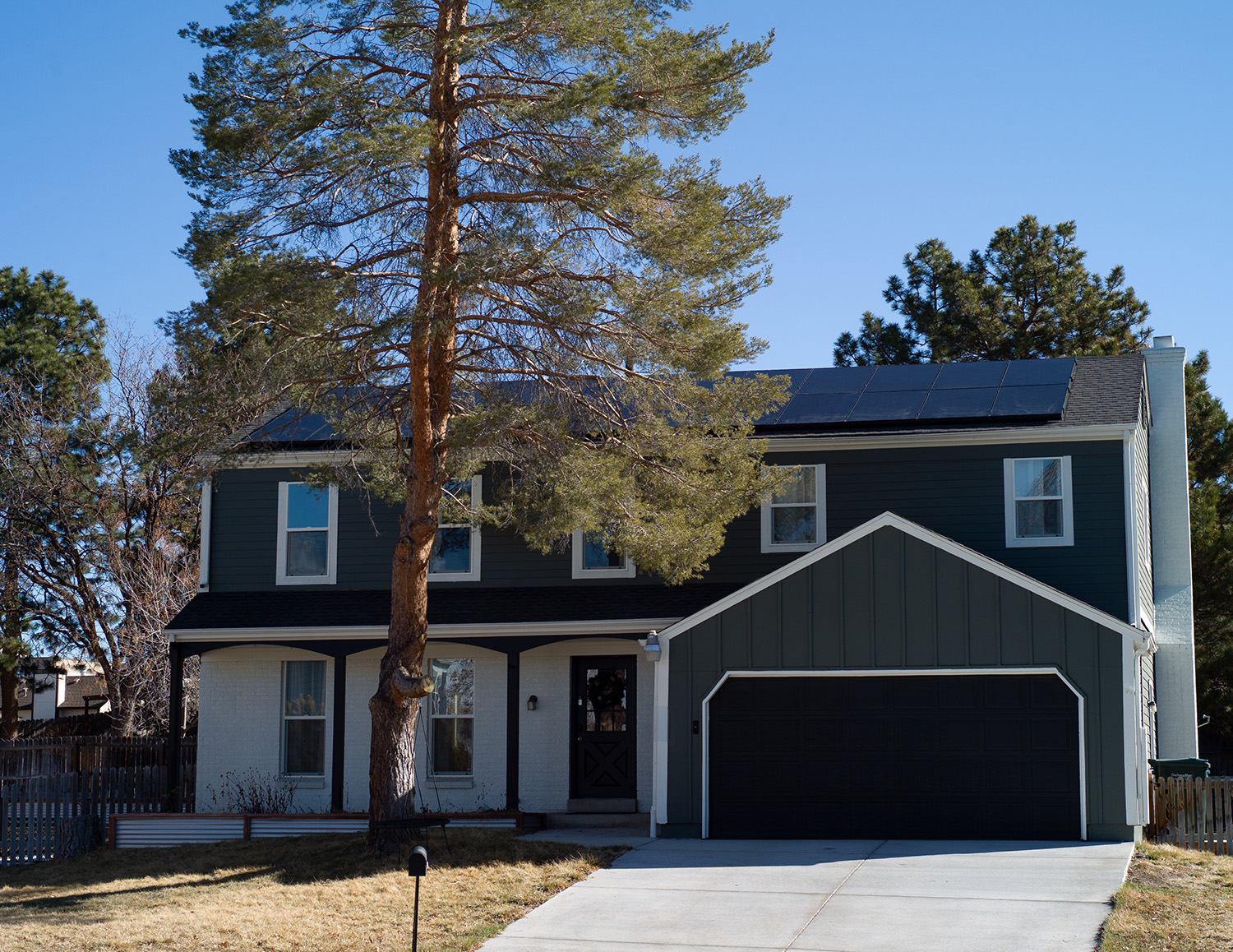
Party house where Carl and Richie went after leaving Rec playground

== Release ==
Due to the negative publicity surrounding a wave of recent youth gang films such as The Warriors, The Wanderers, and Boulevard Nights, Over the Edge was given a limited theatrical release in 1979. It debuted on May 18, 1979, in eight cities in the United States on a test run basis, with the biggest release in Charlotte, North Carolina. By December 1979, it had also been released in Conway, Arkansas, Tulsa, Oklahoma, Los Angeles, California, Fort Worth, Texas, Paducah, Kentucky, Jackson, Mississippi, Shreveport, Louisiana, Monroe, Louisiana, Mayfield, Kentucky, Memphis, Tennessee, El Paso, Texas, Biloxi, Mississippi, Lafayette, Louisiana, Victoria, Texas and Owensboro, Kentucky.

== Soundtrack ==
Side one

1. "Surrender" – Cheap Trick
2. "My Best Friend's Girl" – The Cars
3. "You Really Got Me" – Van Halen
4. "Speak Now or Forever Hold Your Peace" – Cheap Trick
5. "Come On (Part 1)" – Jimi Hendrix

Side two

1. "Just What I Needed" – The Cars
2. "Hello There" – Cheap Trick
3. "Teenage Lobotomy" – Ramones
4. "Downed" – Cheap Trick
5. "All That You Dream" – Little Feat
6. "Ooh Child" – Valerie Carter

In a 1978 interview between Eddie Van Halen and journalist Steve Rosen where the Van Halen guitarist discusses the song "Light Up the Sky," he explained, "Warner Bros. is financing some movie, and they wanted us to write the theme song for it and we were thinking of using that song." While not mentioning the movie by name, Van Halen later describes it as "A neat movie - everyone's going to relate to that. It's high school kids up north in New Granada, some new housing development. They destroy everything, they lock it...they had a PTA meeting, because all the parents were getting together to talk about their problems they were having with all the students and kids destroying the town. And then while all the people were in there, they lock them in, they chain the doors with all the cops inside and stuff. They went out and started smashing the cars and blowing everything up - it was insane...It was supposed to be a true story. So I think maybe the title of that kind of sprung from that. Because it was a real trippy movie, and it would be a good title calling it 'Light Up the Sky.' Because the last scene of the movie was heavy, boy - it’s just a big flash of flame type of thing." Ultimately, the band opted not to give the song to the film, because Van Halen says in the same interview, "We went and saw a screening of the flick...and it ain't gonna win no Academy Award or nothing." Instead, the song was included on the album Van Halen II.

== Reception and legacy ==
On review aggregate website Rotten Tomatoes, Over the Edge has an approval rating of 86% based on 14 critics' reviews.

Vincent Canby of The New York Times gave the movie a positive review, stating, "It's to Mr. Kaplan's credit that he makes New Granada look just as boring and alienated to us as it does to the unfortunate children who live there." Roger Ebert said the film's "violent climax is particularly unconvincing," but the movie captures the "feeling of teen-age frustration and paranoia...and the rhythms of teen-age life...how kids talk and feel and yearn, about the maddening sensation of occupying a body with adolescent values but adult emotions." Ebert concluded the film "does an uncanny job of portraying these kids in a recognizable, convincing way." Both Ebert and Gene Siskel were mixed on an episode of the movie review series Sneak Previews. The performances of Dillon, Michael Kramer, and Pamela Ludwig were also praised by critics.

Richard Labonté of the Ottawa Citizen wrote, "The strength of Over the Edge, and what set it apart...from most of the gang films of the late '70s, was Kaplan's ability to portray more than merely juvenile violence: his kid actors trash their school with the best of them, but the seething reasons for their behavior is discussed and explored and assessed, rather than merely exploited...capturing with discretion and with discernment the anger of suburban sterility and the dependence on the deadening effect of dope."

The film has since gained cult film status. In late 1981, it was shown at "Film at Joseph Papp's Public Theater" as part of "Word of Mouth", a program devoted to films that had been overlooked because of poor marketing or distribution. This screening led to it being listed on critical top-10 lists, and it was favorably reviewed by Vincent Canby at The New York Times. The film then re-emerged in the 1980s with showings on cable, including HBO and a videocassette release in 1989.

In a 2000 review for The Austin Chronicle, Mike Emery said the film is "a vibrant depiction of confused teen life." The Chicago Reader wrote, "Director Jonathan Kaplan has a fine feel for the crushing blandness of 'planned communities'—the anger that possesses his underage heroes proceeds from a physically oppressive emptiness, represented by rows of hollow town houses and vast, blasted fields. Part wish fulfillment and part social moralizing, the film never resolves its point of view, but a few of the apocalyptic images stay in the mind."

A novelization of the film by Charlie Haas and Tim Hunter was published by Grove Press alongside the film's release. Included in the book are 32 pages of photographs from the shooting of the film. The book is long out of print.

Director Richard Linklater has said Over the Edge influenced his 1993 film Dazed and Confused. Over the Edge also partly inspired the music videos for the songs "Smells Like Teen Spirit" by Nirvana and "Evil Eye" by Fu Manchu.

Filmmaker, Harmony Korine has also said Over the Edge was one of the teen film influences for when he wrote Kids for Larry Clark to direct.

In 2021, entertainment website Yardbarker named Over the Edge the “signature film” of the city of Denver.
