= Julia Pomeroy =

American actress and author

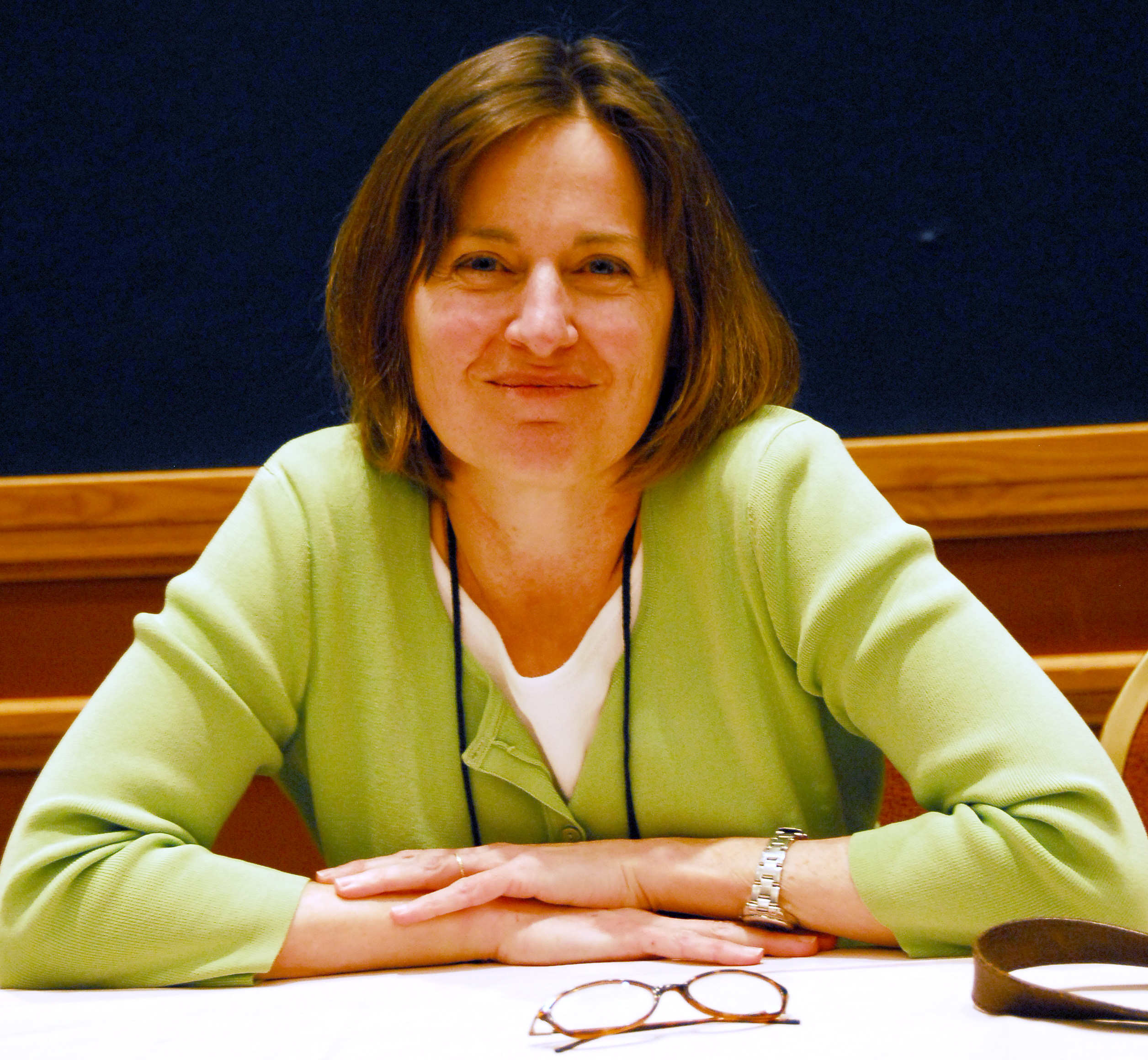
- Born: Okinawa, Japan
- Occupation(s): Film actress, author
- Website: juliapomeroy.com

Julia Pomeroy is an American actress and author. She first came into the public eye after appearing alongside Matt Dillon in the 1979 cult film Over The Edge. She played "Julia", the head of the teenager's rec center, and one of the few adult characters in that film to be liked and trusted by the rebellious youths.

Pomeroy was born in Okinawa, Japan. As the daughter of an American Foreign Service Officer, Pomeroy grew up in such disparate locations as Libya, Somalia, and Italy. At the age of nineteen, she moved back to the United States, and attended Georgetown University and New York University before pursuing a career in acting. Following the birth of her first child, Pomeroy enrolled at Columbia University, where she graduated magna cum laude with a degree in Literature/Writing.

In 2006, Julia Pomeroy's first novel, The Dark End of Town, ISBN 0-7867-1720-3, was published by Carroll and Graf. She currently lives in Columbia County, New York with her husband John and her two children, Jarrett and Andrew.
