= She's Out of Control =

1989 film by Stan Dragoti

- Theatrical release poster
- Directed by: Stan Dragoti
- Written by: Seth Winston; Michael J. Nathanson
- Produced by: Robert Kaufman; Stephen Deutsch
- Starring: Tony Danza; Catherine Hicks; Ami Dolenz
- Cinematography: Donald Peterman
- Edited by: Dov Hoenig
- Music by: Alan Silvestri
- Production company: Weintraub Entertainment Group
- Distributed by: Columbia Pictures
- Release date: April 14, 1989
- Running time: 94 minutes
- Country: United States
- Language: English
- Budget: $12 million
- Box office: $12.1 million

She's Out of Control is a 1989 American independent coming of age comedy film directed by Stan Dragoti, starring Tony Danza, Ami Dolenz and Catherine Hicks. The original music score was composed by Alan Silvestri. The film was marketed with the tagline "She was Daddy's little girl. Now she's at that age when girls go wild, guys go crazy and Dads go nuts". The film was shot with the working title Daddy's Little Girl.

Critical reviews were sharply negative, and She's Out of Control was a box office disappointment.

== Plot ==
Widower Doug Simpson is a radio station manager from California who lives with his two daughters, Katie and Bonnie. When Katie turns 15, she feels that it is time to start looking more grown up. She has been dating Richard, the boy next door, whom her father adores, since middle school. In addition, her unflattering wardrobe has been complemented by her thick glasses and full set of braces. When Doug leaves on a business trip, Katie transforms herself into a beauty with help from her father's girlfriend Janet Pearson.

When Doug returns, he is shocked to find boys from every walk of life interested in dating Katie. When his obsession with Katie and her boyfriends reaches extreme limits, Janet suggests that Doug needs psychiatric help and he seeks out Dr. Herman Fishbinder, an expert who gives him advice that goes wrong whenever it is applied. Through the latter half of the film, Katie has three boyfriends, two of whom she eventually stops dating. At the film's ending, Katie takes a class trip to Europe and reunites with Richard again – at which point Bonnie, her younger tomboy sister, begins her own dating spree. Doug also finds out that the "expert" Dr. Fishbinder was anything but, as he never had a daughter himself.

== Cast ==
- Tony Danza as Doug Simpson
- Catherine Hicks as Janet Pearson
- Wallace Shawn as Dr. Herman Fishbinder
- Dick O'Neill as Chuck Pearson
- Ami Dolenz as Katie Simpson
- Laura Mooney as Bonnie Simpson
- Derek McGrath as Jeff Robbins
- Dana Ashbrook as Joey
- Matthew Perry as Timothy
- Lance Wilson-White as Richard
- Diana Barrows as Lisa
- Michael Ray Bower as Beach Boy
- Todd Bridges as Leroy
- Dustin Diamond as Beach Boy
- Marc Gilpin as Valet
- Mina Kolb as Mrs. Pearson
- Scott Morris as Corvette Kid
- Oliver Muirhead as Nigel
- Kate Murtagh as Chaperone
- Matt McKenzie as Security Officer
- Robbie Rist as Corvette Kid's Friend
- Laura Summer as Receptionist
- Eric Walker as Volleyball Player
- Jim Ladd as DJ (voice)

== Production ==
Initially written under the title Daddy's Little Girl, producer Stephen Deutsch first saw the script when he was at New Century Productions, but he was unable to convince the company to make the film. Although Deutsch moved to Universal Pictures a year later, he remained unable to secure backing from studio executives. Around that time, the Weintraub Entertainment Group was getting started, and Deutsch gave the script to WEG executives David Kirkpatrick and Michael Roberts. The studio approved the project "within a few days." Deutsch hired director Stan Dragoti because of his work on Mr. Mom. In January 1989, it was announced Daddy's Little Girl would be missing its planned February 17 released date as it was not ready for marketing and distribution, the film's titled was changed to She's Out of Control the following month. The film was released in Europe as Keep Your Hands Off My Daughter.

== Reception ==
Based on 20 reviews, Rotten Tomatoes gave the film an approval rating of 10%. On Metacritic, the film has a weighted average score of 20 out of 100, based on 11 critics, indicating "generally unfavorable reviews".

Chicago film critic Roger Ebert gave the film the rare zero stars rating on his written review of the film, saying:

What planet did the makers of this film come from? What assumptions do they have about the purpose and quality of life? I ask because She's Out of Control is simultaneously so bizarre and so banal that it's a first: the first movie fabricated entirely from sitcom cliches and plastic lifestyles, without reference to any known plane of reality.

Chicago film critic Gene Siskel also gave the film zero stars, calling it "a lame comedy that barely resembles a real movie." During his TV review he reported that "when I saw She's Out of Control, I became so depressed I actually thought about quitting my job as a film critic." Only after seeing Say Anything... later the same day was his faith restored. Ebert said on his and Siskel’s show that the film was a “crime” and that it “robbed me of 2 hours of my life in order to give me less than nothing”. Michael Wilmington of the Los Angeles Times called it "a sometimes funny, mostly media-referential movie without much real life; a high-tech, high-pro job that has a glamor-robot feel." Variety said that the film "picks up some wit and steam when Danza begins consulting a shrink ... For too much of its 95-minute running time, though, the film is loud, broad, and panders to the filmmakers' condescending conception of teenage tastes." Caryn James of The New York Times wrote, "Anyone who has watched television for even a night will be able to predict every scene in She's Out of Control with total accuracy. It is an extended version of familiar, bland sitcom situations, with Mr. Danza playing a smoother-edged version of his character on the endlessly running hit Who's the Boss?" Leonard Maltin's film guide gave it 1.5 stars out of 4, stating that it was a "superficial expanded sitcom with Danza offering a one-note performance," concluding with "this one seems as if it was spit out of a computer."

== Soundtrack ==
The soundtrack, distributed by MCA Records in April 1989, was released on vinyl, cassette tape and compact disc. The track listing includes:

1. "Where's the Fire" – Troy Hinton
2. "You Should Be Loving Me" – Brenda K. Starr
3. "Concentration" – Phil Thornalley
4. "The Loneliest Heart" – Boys Club
5. "Hunger of Love" – Harold Faltermeyer
6. "KHEY-FM Radio Sweeper" – Jim Ladd
7. "Winning Side" – Oingo Boingo
8. "Daddy's Little Girl" – Brian Wilson
9. "Venus" – Frankie Avalon
10. "You Really Got Me" – The Kinks
11. "Feel the Shake" – Jetboy

Other songs featured in the film that did not appear on the soundtrack:

- Angel Baby – Beth Anderson
- Secret Agent Man – Johnny Rivers
- Oh Yeah – Yello
- "Make Some Noise" – Jetboy
