= John Byrum =

American film director and writer

- Occupation(s): Director, screenwriter
- Spouses: Linda Fiorentino (m. 1992; div. 1993) Karin Reznack (m. 1997)

John Byrum is an American film director and writer known for The Razor's Edge, Heart Beat, Duets and Inserts.

== Early life ==
Raised in Winnetka, Illinois, on the North Shore of Chicago, Byrum attended New Trier High School, and later studied at New York University in the late 1960s. His instructors included Haig P. Manoogian and graduate student Martin Scorsese, and classmates Oliver Stone and Eric Jenkins. At NYU, he co-wrote Item 72-D, The Adventures of Spa and Fon with director Edward Summer.

== Career ==
As a student, Byrum interned with Jim Henson on early appearances of The Muppets and was later hired by Henson as one of the original writers of Sesame Street. Henson took a special interest in Byrum's talent, and hired him to write freelance projects. Byrum left New York for Hollywood after Byrum's original script Inserts received positive reaction, and he was tapped to write the script Harry and Walter Go to New York by producers and mentors Don Devlin, Tony Bill, and Harry Gittes.

After that script was sold for a record-breaking amount, Byrum was hired to write the Diana Ross vehicle Mahogany. He passed on the chance to write the script for Jaws to work on Mahogany with one of his idols, director Tony Richardson, only to have Richardson leave the film mid-production after clashing with producer Berry Gordy of Motown fame. Berry took over directing chores, and the true drama of Mahogany was said to be the behind-the-camera relationship between Gordy and Ross.

Byrum directed his first feature film Inserts with stars Richard Dreyfuss, Jessica Harper, Veronica Cartwright, Stephen Davies, and Bob Hoskins. Byrum did uncredited work on the script for Valentino because Ken Russell wanted an American co-writer.

Byrum followed soon after as writer/director of Heart Beat, starring Nick Nolte, John Heard, and Sissy Spacek, as Neal Cassady, Jack Kerouac, and Carolyn Cassady, respectively. On this film, Byrum started his long collaborative relationship and friendship with composer Jack Nitzsche.

Byrum teamed with Mahogany producer Rob Cohen, which resulted Scandalous and The Razor's Edge, the 1984 film directed by Byrum based on the W. Somerset Maugham novel starring Bill Murray in his first dramatic role as Larry Darrell, and co-starring Catherine Hicks, Theresa Russell, Denholm Elliott, and James Keach. Byrum and Murray co-wrote the screenplay. The film faltered with critics and audiences, as most were not ready to accept Murray in a noncomedic role. In later years, the film achieved cult status and many fans have traveled to its international locations, to replicate Larry's spiritual journey.

Following the box-office failure of The Razor's Edge, financially strapped Byrum directed the goofy comedy The Whoopee Boys starring Michael O'Keefe and Paul Rodriguez. He was the original director of the TV movie Desperado (1987), but left the project during filming.

=== Later career ===
Byrum created, wrote, and produced several television series, including Middle Ages starring Peter Riegert, Michael O'Keefe, Amy Brenneman, and William Russ, about a group of friends attempting to deal with the onset of their 40s on the North Shore of Chicago; South of Sunset starring Glenn Frey of The Eagles fame, as an unconventional Los Angeles detective; and Winnetka Road starring Josh Brolin, Meg Tilly, Paige Turco, and Ed Begley, Jr., again, dealing with life on Chicago's North Shore. Byrum's television movie Murder in High Places starred Ted Levine as a Hunter Thompson-like character who is elected mayor of a Colorado ski resort, which showcased a young Lisa Kudrow in one of her first acting roles.

Byrum was scheduled to direct his original script of karaoke road-trip dramedy Duets when he was felled by a serious case of Lyme disease that had gone long undiagnosed. Byrum's friend Bruce Paltrow wanted to direct Duets with his daughter Gwyneth Paltrow as one of the six ensemble characters. Brad Pitt was attached to co-star with Paltrow, his fiancée at the time, but when their engagement ended, the film's financing faltered once again. Duets was filmed several years later with Scott Speedman in the role originally chosen by Pitt, along with Paul Giamatti, Maria Bello, Andre Braugher, and Huey Lewis.

== Personal life ==
John Byrum married actress Linda Fiorentino on June 23, 1992. Byrum and Fiorentino worked together on the movie The War at Home, which began filming April 15, 1988; the two were in a relationship at that point. Byrum wrote the script, which was loosely based on the life of model and actress Edie Sedgwick; however, the film was never completed. The couple divorced in 1993, after a year of marriage, for reasons not known. In 1997, Byrum married his current wife, American screenwriter Karin Reznack.

== Filmography ==
Film

Year	Title	Director	Writer
1975	Inserts	Yes	Yes
1975	Mahogany	No	Yes
1975	Have a Nice Weekend	No	Yes
1976	Harry and Walter Go to New York	No	Yes
1977	Valentino	No	Uncredited
1980	Heart Beat	Yes	Yes
1981	Sphinx	No	Yes
1984	Scandalous	No	Yes
1984	The Razor's Edge	Yes	Yes
1986	The Whoopee Boys	Yes	No
2000	Duets	No	Yes

TV series

Year	Title	Director	Writer	Executive Producer	Notes
1985	Alfred Hitchcock Presents	Yes	Yes	No	Directed episode "Night Caller"
1990	Shannon's Deal	Yes	Yes	No	Episode "Sanctuary"
1992	Middle Ages	No	Yes	Yes	
1993	South of Sunset	No	Yes	Yes	Episodes "Satyricon" and "Custody"
1994	Winnetka Road	No	Yes	Yes	3 episodes; Also creator

TV movies

Year	Title	Director	Writer	Executive Producer	Notes
1987	Desperado	Uncredited	No	No	Replaced by Virgil W. Vogel
1991	Murder in High Places	Yes	Yes	Yes	
1995	To the Beat of the Drum	No	No	Yes	
1996	Desert Breeze	No	Yes	Yes	
