= Stan Rogow =

American film and television producer (1948–2023)

- Born: November 30, 1948; New York City, U.S.
- Died: December 7, 2023 (aged 75); Los Angeles, California, U.S.
- Education: USC Gould School of Law
- Alma mater: Boston University (AB); Boston University School of Law (JD)
- Occupations: Music manager; producer; writer; lawyer
- Years active: 1982–2023
- Children: Jackson

Stan Rogow (November 30, 1948 – December 7, 2023) was an American music manager, writer, and producer of film and television. He received three Emmy nominations, one for 1982 NBC TV series Fame and two for Disney Channel's Lizzie McGuire.

== Early life and education ==
Rogow was born on November 30, 1948, in Brooklyn, New York. According to Rogow, at the age of 5, Paramount Pictures offered him a contract because he could sing and dance, but his parents declined the offer. He graduated from Boston University with a Bachelor of Arts and from the Boston University School of Law with a Juris Doctor. He also studied at the USC Gould School of Law.

== Career ==
Rogow worked as a lawyer in Roxbury, Boston. He worked as executive-in-charge of CBS television film Playing for Time. He then moved to Los Angeles and worked on the TV series Fame. By 1989, he formed Rogow Productions.

His television credits include Lizzie McGuire, Shannon's Deal, Flight 29 Down, Darcy's Wild Life, State of Grace, Nowhere Man, Valemont,, South of Sunset. He created 1992 CBS series Middle Ages. He produced the television films Nowhere to Hide, Murder in High Places, Help Wanted: Kids, Rock 'N Roll Mom and Hardhat and Legs. He also produced feature films The Clan of the Cave Bear, All I Want For Christmas, Men of War, and The Lizzie McGuire Movie.

Rogow earned three Emmy nominations, one in 1982 for NBC's Fame, and two for Disney Channel's Lizzie McGuire. He was an executive producer of Corbin Bleu's debut album Another Side.

In 2007, he started the production company Electric Farm Entertainment. With Electric Farm, he produced internet series Gemini Division, Woke Up Dead and Afterworld. He was known as the "king of tweens" due to his notable career in producing television programming for teenagers. He was guest lecturer at the American Film Institute, USC Film School and UCLA Film School.

== Personal life and death ==
He was the father of actor Jackson Rogow.

He died at UCLA Medical Center in Los Angeles on December 7, 2023, at age 75.

== Awards and nominations ==
=== As executive producer ===
Year	Nominated work	Award	Result
1982	Fame	Primetime Emmy Award for Outstanding Drama Series	Nominated
2003	Lizzie McGuire	Primetime Emmy Award for Outstanding Children's Program	Nominated
2004	Lizzie McGuire	Primetime Emmy Award for Outstanding Children's Program	Nominated
