= American Dragon =

American Dragon may refer to:

- Bryan Danielson, professional wrestler who used the ring name "American Dragon"
- American Dragon: Jake Long, an animated television series

== See also ==
- American Dragons, a 1998 film
