= Don Stark =

American actor (born 1954)

- Born: Donald Martin Stark; July 5, 1954 (age 72); New York City, New York, U.S.
- Education: California State University, Northridge
- Occupation: Actor
- Years active: 1973–present

Donald Martin Stark (born July 5, 1954) is an American actor known for his role as Bob Pinciotti on the Fox Network sitcom That '70s Show for all eight seasons (1998–2006) and fictional Los Angeles Devils owner Oscar Kinkade in VH1's Hit the Floor, Star Trek: First Contact (1996), and John Carter (2012). He also provided the voice of Vincent in Father of the Pride (2004–2005) and voiced Rhino in Spider-Man: The Animated Series (1995–1997). He has two daughters.

== Early life and education ==
As a child, Stark and his family relocated to Los Angeles, California, settling in the San Fernando Valley. Stark graduated from Grover Cleveland High School in Reseda, California, in 1972. He played football for the school team, and he won leading roles in the theater arts department. He portrayed Marvin Hudgens in Dark of the Moon, Sky Masterson in Guys and Dolls, Tevye in Fiddler on the Roof, and, in an award-winning Shakespeare Festival scene, the title role in Othello.

After high school, Stark attended California State University, Northridge, originally studying business before deciding to major in theater arts.

== Career ==
Stark is probably best recognized as Bob Pinciotti, the bumbling next-door neighbor of the Forman family and the father of Donna Pinciotti (Laura Prepon) on the FOX sitcom That '70s Show.

Stark's roles in movies include Switchblade Sisters (1975), Tilt (1979), Evilspeak (1981), Peggy Sue Got Married (1986) and The Couch Trip (1988), as well as a small role as a clerk in the comedy film Feds (1988). He has also been a guest on Curb Your Enthusiasm, and had a small role in the Star Trek film Star Trek: First Contact. He had a small role in an episode of Supernatural as a victim of a ghost that had been summoned by ritual to murder. He also guest starred on Viper, Disney Channel's Cory in the House, Stargate SG-1 and CSI.

He had a supporting role in the 1996 television series Time Cop. In addition, he appeared in iCarly's movie: iGo to Japan as Freight Dog, the pilot who flies the gang over to Tokyo, Japan.

Stark appears in the first episode of the 1987 TV series Beauty and the Beast as one of the attackers who puts Linda Hamilton's character "Catherine" in Central Park where the beast, or "Vincent", played by Ron Perlman, finds her and helps her, which begins the series. He appeared as David in the film My Name is Jerry. He appeared as the Prime Minister of Russia in the episode of Cory in the House, "Air Force One Too Many". He plays the boss, Stan, in the web series Corey & Lucas For the Win. He also provided his voice for Rhino in few episodes of Spider-Man: The Animated Series.

One of his more recent appearances was as a mobster in the episode of Castle, "Murder He Wrote". He also had a small, uncredited role as a principal in Anger Management, "Charlie Lets Kate Take Charge". Stark plays the role of Oscar Kincade in the television series Hit the Floor. He played Uncle Frank in the 2015 film Hello, My Name Is Doris. He played Judge Talbertson in the 2017 Scorpion episode, "Who Let the Dog Out ('Cause Now It's Stuck In a Cistern')". Also in 2017, Stark played Bernie Greenfield, a drug-addicted Hollywood executive in There's...Johnny!.

== Filmography ==
=== Film ===
Year	Title	Role	Notes
1973	Outrage	Carl Dibble	
1975	Switchblade Sisters	Hook	
1979	Tilt	Gary Laswitz	
1981	Evilspeak	Bubba Caldwell	
1981	Choices	Lance	
1986	Peggy Sue Got Married	Doug Snell	
1988	The Couch Trip	Peterson	
1988	Under the Gun	Joey	
1988	Arthur 2: On the Rocks	Diner Customer	
1988	Feds	Willy	
1991	9 1/2 Ninjas!	'Sledge'	
1991	Liquid Dreams	Escort to Penthouse	
1993	The Baby Doll Murders	Eric Green	
1993	Freaked	Editor	
1993	Lightning in a Bottle	Yard Messenger	
1993	Arcade	Finster	Direct-to-video
1994	3 Ninjas Kick Back	Umpire	
1994	Revenge of the Red Baron	Detective Lewis	
1994	Ring of Steel	Lieutenant Taylor	
1994	Maverick	Riverboat Poker Player (uncredited)	
1995	3 Ninjas Knuckle Up	Sheriff	
1995	Night of the Running Man	Rodney	
1995	Things to Do in Denver When You're Dead	Gus	
1995	Bombmeister	Unknown	
1996	Heaven's Prisoners	Eddie Keats	
1996	Santa with Muscles	Lenny	
1996	Star Trek: First Contact	Nicky 'The Nose'	
1997	Earth Minus Zero	John "J. W." Wayne	
1998	Letters from a Killer	Geary	
1998	American Dragons	Rocco	
1999	California Myth	Marshall	
1999	Goosed	Dick	
2002	The 4th Tenor	Tony	
2004	Slammed	Uncle Mack	
2005	Spider-Man: The Venom Saga	Venom (voice)	Direct-to-video
2009	Dark House	Detective Gorog	
2009	My Name Is Jerry	David	
2011	Meeting Spencer	"Wolfie"	
2012	John Carter	Dix, The Storekeeper	
2013	Wrong Cops	Gary	
2013	Random Encounters	Dr. Tim	
2014	Roswell FM	Howard Bellringo	
2015	Hello, My Name Is Doris	Uncle Frank	
2015	Safelight	Jack	
2016	Monkey Up	Tucker (voice)	
2016	Café Society	Sol	
2016	C Street	Super	
2018	Green Book	Jules Podell	
2019	7 Days to Vegas	Jim "Angry Jim"	

=== Television ===
Year	Title	Role	Notes
1975	Welcome Back, Kotter	Student Extra	Episodes: "Welcome Back (Pilot)" and "Whodunit?"
1975–1977	The Streets of San Francisco	Jim Riley / Henry Brown	Episodes: "School of Fear" and "Innocent No More"
1978	Black Sheep Squadron	Radio Operator	Episode: "Wolves in the Sheep Pen"
1978	Police Story	Ron	Episode: "A Chance to Live"
1978	CHiPs	Officer Allen	Episode: "Family Crisis"
1978	Return Engagement	Waiter	Television movie
1979	Quincy, M.E.	Henessey	Episode: "Semper-Fidelis"
1984	Riptide	Matt	Episode: "Where the Girls Are"
1985	Hell Town	Joe	Episode: "Love and the Four Corners"
1986	The Twilight Zone	Punk #2	Episode: "A Day in Beaumont/The Last Defender of Camelot"
1986–1987	Sledge Hammer!	Kurt Kruggle	Episodes: "Under the Gun" and "Sledgepoo"
1987	Beauty and the Beast	Stocky Guy	Episode: "Once Upon a Time in the City of New York"
1987	Cagney & Lacey	Perry DeScarfo	Episode: "Video Verite"
1988	The Charmings	Marty	Episode: "Birth of a Salesman"
1988	Night Court	Monroe	Episode: "Chrizzi's Honor"
1988	General Hospital	Ripley	13 episodes
1989	Beauty and the Beast	Eddie	Episode: "Brothers"
1989	Starting Now	Chuck	Television movie
1989	A Cry for Help: The Tracey Thurman Story	Officer Driscoll	Television movie
1989	Hardball	Unknown	Episode: "The Cleveland Indian"
1991	Equal Justice	Sergeant Samuelson	Episode: "The Big Game and Other Crimes"
1991	The Man in the Family	Cha Cha	7 episodes
1991	Empty Nest	Timmy	Episode: "Almost Like Being in Love"
1991	The Golden Girls	Sheriff	Episode: "
1992	Blossom	Cop #2	Episode: "Three O'Clock and All Is Hell"
1992	Civil Wars	Marty DeMeo	Episode: "Whippet 'Til It Breaks"
1992	Sinatra	Unknown	Television miniseries
1993	Elvis and the Colonel: The Untold Story	Dutch	Television movie
1993	Baywatch	Policeman	Episode: "The Tower"
1993	South of Sunset	Bus Driver	Episode: "Satyricon"
1993	Star Trek: Deep Space Nine	Ashrock	Episode: "Melora"
1994	Viper	Manny	Episode: "Safe as Houses"
1994	Beverly Hills, 90210	David's Shrink	Episode: "Heartbreakers"
1994	NYPD Blue	Richard Corday	Episode: "Black Men Can't Jump"
1994	Duckman: Private Dick/Family Man	IRS Agent / Additional Voice (voice)	Episode: "T.V. or Not to Be" and "Not So Easy Riders"
1994	Silk Stalkings	Tony – Strip Club Manager	Episode: "The Deep End$
1994	Ellen	Repairman	Episode: "The Refrigerator"
1995	Charlie Grace	Detective Simms	Episodes: "Take Me to the Pilot" and "The Kid"
1995–1996	Bless This House	Lenny	16 episodes
1995–1997	Spider-Man	Rhino / Alex O'Hirn (voice)	8 episodes
1996	Picket Fences	Stubby Muller	Episode: "Dante's Inferno"
1996	Murder One	Carmine D'Nardis	Episodes: "Chapter Seven, Year Two" and "Chapter Eight, Year Two"
1997	Dark Skies	Gallagher	Episode: "Both Sides Now"
1997	Murder Live!	Man in Yellow Suit	Television movie
1997–1998	Timecop	Eugene Matuzek	9 episodes
1997	Diagnosis Murder	Detective Dave Groeber	Episode: "Blood Brothers Murder"
1997	L.A. Heat	Treat Donnelly	Episode: "Chester Nut"
1998	Brooklyn South	George Hauer	Episode: "Exposing Johnson"
1998–2006	That '70s Show	Bob Pinciotti	Main cast
1998	Early Edition	Stan Kowaleski	Episode: "Walk, Don't Run"
1998	Michael Hayes	Rutigliano	Episode: "Imagine: Part 2"
2000	Diagnosis Murder	Stanley Bomgarden	Episode: "All Dressed Up and Nowhere to Die"
2001	That's Life	Alan Derwin	Episode: "Idiots"
2002	Maybe It's Me	Ed	Episode: "The Lab Partner Episode"
2002–2004	Curb Your Enthusiasm	Stu Braudy	3 episodes
2003	CSI: Crime Scene Investigation	Sam Hopkins	Episode: "Grissom Versus the Volcano"
2004–2005	Father of the Pride	Vincent (voice)	10 episodes
2006	Stargate SG-1	Sal	Episode: "Memento Mori"
2007	The Young and the Restless	Minister Frank McCallister	1 episode
2007	Supernatural	Jay Wiley	Episode: "Hollywood Babylon"
2007	Cory in the House	Russian Prime Minister	Episode: "Air Force One Too Many"
2008	iCarly	Freight Dog	Episode: "iGo to Japan"
2008	Dirty Sexy Money	Detective Moffett (uncredited)	Episode: "The Family Lawyer"
2010	Melissa & Joey	Phil DeMarco	Episode: "Pilot"
2011	Workshop	Terry Tompkins	4 episodes
2011	Law & Order: LA	Mayor Jack Velman	Episode: "East Pasadena"
2012	The Mentalist	Armon Gagnon	Episode: "Not One Red Cent"
2012–2014	Castle	Vincent Cardano	Episodes: "Murder He Wrote" and "Driven"
2012	NCIS	Marty Fiero	Episode: "The Good Son"
2012	American Horror Story	Kit's Lawyer	Episode: "Dark Cousin"
2013	Anger Management	Principal	Episode: "Charlie Lets Kate Take Change"
2013–2018	Hit the Floor	Oscar Kincade	Main cast
2013	Blockhead	Marcos	Episode: "Linus and the Landlord"
2014	Red Sleep	Dr. George Reed	Episode: "Adapt"
2015	The Mindy Project	Don Castellano	Episode: "Mindy and Ninny"
2015	The Good Wife	Manny Hofstedter	Episode: "KSR"
2016	The Odd Couple	Mr. Blaustein	Episode: "All the Residents' Men"
2016	Maron	Gerry	5 episodes
2016	Rosewood	Captain Roy Murillo	Episode: "Eddie & the Empire State of Mind"
2016	The Strain	James O'Neill	Episode: "Do or Die"
2017	NCIS	Auto Mechanic	Episode: "Voices"
2017	There's...Johnny!	Bernie Greenfield	3 episodes
2017	Scorpion	Judge Kramer	Episode: "Who Let the Dog Out ('Cause Now It's Stuck in a Cistern)"
2018	Shameless	Congressman Wayne Ubberman	Episode: "Weirdo Gallagher Vortex"
2019	General Hospital	Judge Benjamin	Episode: Feb 20, 2019
2022	Dollface	Craig Wiley	Episode: "Homecoming Queen"
2023–2024	That '90s Show	Bob Pinciotti	9 episodes
2024–present	The Family Business	Senator Patrick Pettway	Recurring cast

=== Video games ===
Year	Title	Voice role	Notes
2025	Delta Force: Black Hawk Down Campaign	Hawke Executive	
