= Inserts (film) =

1975 British film

- Film poster
- Directed by: John Byrum
- Written by: John Byrum
- Produced by: Davina Belling; Harry Benn; Clive Parsons
- Starring: Richard Dreyfuss; Jessica Harper; Veronica Cartwright; Bob Hoskins; Stephen Davies
- Cinematography: Denys N. Coop
- Edited by: Michael Bradsell
- Production companies: Film and General Productions
- Distributed by: United Artists
- Release dates: 22 November 1975 (Paris International Film Festival); 5 February 1976 (Los Angeles)
- Running time: 117 minutes
- Country: United Kingdom
- Language: English
- Budget: $283,000–$350,000

Inserts is a 1975 British comedy-drama film written and directed by John Byrum in his directorial debut, and starring Richard Dreyfuss, Jessica Harper, Bob Hoskins, and Veronica Cartwright.

The plot concerns actors and directors in the early 1930s who were unable to make the transition from silent films to talkies, and thus turned to making pornography. The film's title uses the double meaning that "inserts" both refers to a film technique and sexual intercourse. Inserts was filmed in the vein of a one-act stage play on one set and filmed entirely in real time.

== Plot ==
Before the opening titles, in the present day, an audience of men and women are watching a 1930s black-and-white stag film. After it ends, a man complains that there was no "cum shot".

In Hollywood in the early 1930s, shortly after the start of the talkie period, a young Hollywood director known as Boy Wonder has fallen out of favour with the studios, ostensibly due to his reluctance to lower his standards or abandon his experimental style, such as using a hand-held camera. He turns to churning out stag films for easy money, and because of his alcoholism and fear of leaving his house, he works out of his decaying mansion, which is the only one left on a street being turned into a freeway.

On the morning of a shoot, heroin-addicted waitress Harlene arrives. Harlene was a well-known star during the silent film era, and she too is reluctant to join the ranks of the "talkies" due in part to her high-pitched voice. She is now the star in the first of his six-picture deal. She prepares and shoots heroin while Boy Wonder drinks heavily during a conversation about the changing times in Hollywood.

Actor Rex, known as "the Wonder Dog", then arrives, wearing a suit with grass stains on his knees. He has just come from his job working for a mortician. Rex has met a man from a studio who offered to put him in the mainstream talkies, and he has an appointment to meet him in his hotel room later that day.

In the middle of the shoot, pornographic film producer Big Mac appears. He has heroin packets in his pocket, an unlit cigar in his mouth, wads of money for Rex, and wannabe actress Cathy Cake hanging on his arm. Harlene takes her payment in heroin and later dies from an overdose in an upstairs bedroom. Rex finds the dead body, and while everyone is upset over this turn of events, Boy Wonder talks about continuing the shoot to complete his film, but Rex refuses to perform with a dead woman.

Big Mac offers Rex a part in a mainstream movie to get his help in disposing of Harlene's body. While the two are away, Boy Wonder offers to film Cathy to insert shots of her nude body to double for Harlene. At first, Cathy refuses to undress, but after relenting and doing it, she becomes aroused by Boy Wonder filming her. She eventually has sex with him but is disappointed after learning the camera was off. Boy Wonder's sexual experience with Cathy marks the end of his longstanding problem with impotence.

Boy Wonder, however, realises that this romantic encounter was a ploy to get her into the film and that she has used and directed him the way he used and directed her. Big Mac and Rex return to find both of them half-naked. In a jealous rage, Big Mac ends his six-picture stag film contract with Boy Wonder, who by this time is entirely drunk. Thinking he has had sex with Cathy, Big Mac hits Boy Wonder and Rex hits him on the head with the bottle. Big Mac takes the film reel that Boy Wonder has shot and, as he leaves with Rex and Cathy, he tells Boy Wonder that Clark Gable, a new little-known actor, who had been heard to say he intended to call on Boy Wonder about a film project, is approaching the house.

After Boy Wonder is left alone, there is insistent knocking at the door, but Boy Wonder does not answer it. Instead, he plays piano and sings to celebrate overcoming his impotence.

== Cast ==
- Richard Dreyfuss as Boy Wonder
- Jessica Harper as Cathy Cake
- Veronica Cartwright as Harlene
- Bob Hoskins as Big Mac
- Stephen Davies as Rex

== Production ==
The film was originally written in 1972. John Byrum felt his career was, in his words, "going nowhere fast. I was asked to write a porn film but I couldn't so instead I wrote a film about trying to write in the porno genre. It's a very personal film."

Byrum was unable to raise finance but the script was read by Tony Bill who then hired Byrum to write Harry and Walter Go to New York. When this script was sold for $500,000, Byrum was considered "hot" and he was able to raise finance for Inserts. The money came from United Artists, Devina Belling, Clive Parsons and star Richard Dreyfuss, who had just made Jaws. (Belling and Parsons helped finance Harry and Walter.) The film was made in London over three weeks on a budget of approximately $350,000 of which $150,000 went to Dreyfuss.

Byrum said the film "would probably have been better accepted ten years ago but whether people love or hate the movie they should know that everyone involved made a commitment and believed in it."

The film involves waist-up nude scenes from Jessica Harper, and full frontal nudity from Veronica Cartwright and Stephen Davies. A tie-in novel was written by Graham Masterton.

== Release ==
=== Rating and censorship ===
The film was originally given an X rating by the Motion Picture Association of America (MPAA). Richard Dreyfuss personally appealed the decision, but the appeal was unsuccessful. "We knew it would be controversial but had no idea it would get an X rating," said Belling. "It is a film about survival, ambition and fear of rejection but nobody seems to understand that." In 1996, the MPAA re-rated the film, reducing it from an X rating to an NC-17.

In Michigan, students at Grand Valley College scheduled a campus screening of the film which elicited censorship efforts to ban the film. The ban was ultimately overturned by the Michigan Supreme Court, citing free speech as a "natural right." Judge Douglas Woodruff Hillman wrote of the overturning: "Only by the free flow of ideas does society become enriched. Only by the back and forth controversy do we gain the capacity for critical analysis which tends to correct errors."

=== Home media ===
Twilight Time released a limited edition Blu-ray of the film on 14 June 2016. A Blu-ray edition was reissued by MGM Home Entertainment on 25 February 2018.

== Reception ==
=== Box office ===
The film was a box office disappointment.

=== Critical response ===
Roger Ebert gave Inserts 2.5 stars out of a possible 4, writing that the film's dialogue was stilted and the setting not entirely convincing, but that Dreyfuss and Cartwright gave effective performances and the film "has a certain quirky charm." Gene Siskel of the Chicago Tribune awarded an identical 2.5-star grade and observed, "You can tell the film was directed by a writer. Many times it reads like a play, one of those plays in which dialog always echoes earlier dialog. But that's where Dreyfuss' energy rescues the film. He supplies the rough edge that busts up the concocted script." Vincent Canby of The New York Times thought that the film was "essentially a stunt, a slapstick melodrama in the form of a one-act, one-set, five-character play. It is, however, a very clever, smart-mouthed stunt that, in its self-described 'degenerate' way, recalls more accurately aspects of old Hollywood than any number of other period films, including 'Gable and Lombard.'" Perry Stewart of the Fort Worth Star-Telegram gave the film a favorable review, describing it as "classy" and praising the screenplay and performances of Dreyfuss and Harper. Michael Walsh of The Province praised the film as an "impressive, absorbing, raucously funny, ultimately tragic film... in terms of box-office returns, [it] may have been a poor choice for Dreyfuss and his co-stars. In terms of artistic advancement, though, it is a big boost for a lot of them."

A review in Variety declared, "Chalk up Byrum as a director with a good flair for handling actors, with Jessica Harper scoring as the shrewd innocent and Stephen Davies and Bob Hoskins right as the more flamboyant stud actor and boss respectively. But it is all somewhat too surface despite its possible allusions to highly fictionalized real Hollywood '30s types." Kevin Thomas of the Los Angeles Times called it "one of those pictures that's absolutely determined to tell it like it was—or still is. But writer-director John Byrum is so intent on this it apparently never occurred to him that he really doesn't have anything to say that isn't already pretty well known—mainly, that Hollywood could be/can be a pretty sordid place, endlessly deceptive even to the most jaded."

Gary Arnold of The Washington Post panned the film as "one of those trashy concepts with nowhere to go but back to the trash heap. The sooner this sordid and pretentious fiasco drops out of sight, the better it will be for several promising careers, particularly the career of Richard Dreyfuss, who has committed a formidable artistic faux pas by hitching his lively, ascendant star to a worthless vehicle." Pauline Kael of The New Yorker stated, "Byrum is only twenty-eight, and this film was made (in England) on a small budget (around a half million). Still, the Boy Wonder's callow paradoxes ('Nothing pure, old sport, is ever simple,' followed by 'Nothing simple is ever pure') and the pearls of condescending wisdom that he drops are pure juvenilia." Tom Milne of The Monthly Film Bulletin wrote that early on "Inserts looks as though it might be going somewhere as a reflection on Hollywood's fall from dream factory to second-hand porn pusher," but then "the script wanders well out of its depth into some turgid ruminations about artistic integrity versus commercial opportunism, simultaneously taking the opportunity to indulge a little titillation until the whole thing begins to founder with embarrassed self-mockery into routine sexploitation."

The film holds a score of 69% on Rotten Tomatoes based on 13 reviews, with an average rating of 5.8/10.

== Stage production ==
The three producers felt the material would work as a play and Byrum agreed. He adapted the script into a play and it debuted in New York in 1982 starring Kevin O'Connor.

=== Reception ===
Mel Gussow of The New York Times said "the play takes itself far too seriously while festooning the stage with turgid dialogue and tawdry situations." Walter Kerr of the same publication called it a " dreadful little piece".

== See also ==
- List of films set in a single location

== Sources ==
- Geltzer, Jeremy (2017). Film Censorship in America: A State-by-State History. Jefferson, North Carolina: McFarland. ISBN 978-1-476-63012-0.
- LoBrutto, Vincent (2021). The Seventies: The Decade That Changed American Film Forever. Lanham, Maryland: Rowman & Littlefield. ISBN 978-1-538-13719-2.
- Vaughn, Stephen (2006). Freedom and Entertainment: Rating the Movies in an Age of New Media. Cambridge, England: Cambridge University Press. ISBN 978-0-521-85258-6.
