= South of Sunset =

Television series

- Genre: Crime drama
- Created by: Stan Rogow; John Byrum
- Starring: Glenn Frey; Aries Spears; Maria Pitillo
- Country of origin: United States
- Original language: English
- No. of seasons: 1
- No. of episodes: 7

Production
- Executive producers: Stan Rogow; John Byrum
- Running time: 60 minutes
- Production companies: Stan Rogow Productions; Byrum Power & Light; Paramount Television

Original release
- Network: CBS
- Release: October 27, 1993

South of Sunset is an American crime drama television series that aired on CBS in 1993. The program starred Glenn Frey, Aries Spears, and Maria Pitillo and premiered on October 27, 1993. The premiere episode performed poorly in the ratings, causing the network to cancel the series shortly thereafter. Four additional episodes were produced but never aired on CBS; these would be shown on VH1 years later.

== Synopsis ==
Frey played Cody McMahon, former chief of security for a major motion picture studio who left his financially secure, yet unfulfilling job to become a private investigator. Cody's offices were located just south of Sunset Boulevard in Beverly Hills. As a result, he calls his business the Beverly Hills Detective Agency, despite the fact he's in the "low-end" part of town. Aries Spears co-starred as Cody's young assistant Ziggy Duane, and Maria Pitillo played his cute blond secretary (and aspiring actress) Gina Weston. The show was a combination of comedy and suspense, reminiscent of the series Moonlighting. The show was created by John Byrum, who wrote all six of the episodes that were produced, and served as co-executive producer with Stan Rogow.

=== Development ===
CBS had green-lighted South of Sunset with a six episode buy. Pitillo became involved early on, in part because of her collaboration with the Rogow/Byrum team on the Middle Ages project. Spears was hired shortly after Pitillo, and both read with prospective actors auditioning for the part of Cody McMahon. After four months however, the producers still struggled to cast the male lead. It was only after Paramount execs saw Frey in concert, and recalled his previous acting experience, that they suggested him for the role of Cody McMahon.

Five of the seven scripts were produced. It remains unclear if Remember Me, and/or Chalk Lines were ever filmed.

=== Network run ===
The show was heavily promoted during the 1993 World Series by CBS. However, only the pilot of South of Sunset ever aired, and not even to the entire country. The October 27 premiere was pre-empted by several West Coast stations (including KCBS in Los Angeles itself) due to news coverage of wildfires in Malibu. (KCBS later aired the pilot the following Saturday, October 30 at 11:30pm.) Disappointed with the ratings of the pilot and unwilling to give it a chance to build a base, CBS immediately cancelled the show, much to Frey's chagrin.

=== Criticism ===
Delays in production pushed back the premiere date until October, and CBS came under criticism for choosing not to provide advance copies of the pilot to critics, leaving Rogow to comment after the cancellation:

"There was a perception we had something to hide, but we just didn't have the pilot ready," he said. "Forgive me, people in publicity, but how about trying the truth? Why not send the critics two other episodes we had finished and tell them the pilot was still being worked on? At least we would have been reviewed."

The network also came under fire from the production community, which was already unhappy with the networks new policy of purchasing shows in blocks of six instead of the usual eight, thirteen, or even a complete twenty-two episode season. CBS execs countered by saying that South of Sunset had almost no base audience to build on, and had negatively impacted the time-slot winner 48 Hours, which followed the premiere episode.

=== VH1 rebroadcast ===
VH1 re-aired the pilot and four more episodes as part of their Eagles Family Tree Week.

== Episodes ==
No.	Title	Directed by	Written by	Original release date
1	"Satyricon"	Andy Tennant	Story by : John Byrum & Stan Rogow; Teleplay by : John Byrum	October 27, 1993
2	"Dream Girl"	N/A	N/A	Unaired
3	"Custody"	N/A	N/A	Unaired
4	"Family Affair"	Bruce Seth Green	Terry Curtis Fox	Unaired
5	"Newspaper Boy"	N/A	N/A	Unaired
6	"Remember Me"	N/A	N/A	Unaired

== Cast ==
- Glenn Frey as Cody McMahon
- Maria Pitillo as Gina Weston
- Aries Spears as Ziggy Duane
