= Jamey Sheridan =

American actor

- Born: July 12, 1951 (age 75); Pasadena, California, U.S.
- Occupation: Actor
- Years active: 1981–present
- Spouse: Colette Kilroy (m. 1993)
- Children: 3

James Patrick Sheridan (born July 12, 1951) is an American actor known for playing a wide range of roles in theater, film, and television. He is known for Randall Flagg in The Stand (1994), Captain James Deakins on Law & Order: Criminal Intent (2001–2006), and Robert Queen on Arrow (2012–2019).

== Career ==
Sheridan's acting career has encompassed theater, television, and feature film productions. Born in Pasadena, California, to a family of actors, he earned a Tony nomination in 1987 for his performance in the revival of Arthur Miller's All My Sons. After several TV movie appearances, Sheridan landed a starring role as lawyer Jack Shannon on Shannon's Deal, which ran for one season in 1990. His later television roles include Dr. John Sutton on Chicago Hope (from 1995 to 1996).

An avid football player in his youth, Sheridan studied acting at UC Santa Barbara as sports injuries prevented him from taking dance classes. After a brief stint at the Old Globe in San Diego, Sheridan left California to travel the world. With stops in Hawaii and the Mediterranean, Sheridan settled for a period in Edinburgh. His experience there prompted him to head home to the U.S. and return to acting. He landed in New York and kept busy working in a number of productions by recognized playwrights as diverse as Bernard Shaw and Neil Simon.

Sheridan started his film career in the late 1980s with small roles. His first on screen appearance was in the Whoopi Goldberg vehicle Jumpin' Jack Flash. By the 1990s, he was playing family man roles in both film and television, such as in the 1991 motion picture All I Want for Christmas. He also has played villains. In 1994 he played the character of Randall Flagg in the miniseries adaptation of Stephen King's The Stand. Other roles include Marty Stouffer in Wild America and the psychotic neighbor in Video Voyeur: The Susan Wilson Story. After a long history of performing Shakespeare on the stage, Sheridan appeared in Campbell Scott's production of Hamlet in 2000 as well as the Hamlet-inspired modern noir film Let the Devil Wear Black (1999). He co-starred in the improvisational film The Simian Line in 2001. He has also given supporting performances in The Ice Storm, Cradle Will Rock, Life as a House, and numerous TV movies.

Sheridan played Capt. James Deakins in the television series Law & Order: Criminal Intent. Late in the 2004–2005 season, Sheridan began wearing an eyepatch as he began showing the symptoms of Bell's palsy. This was written into the show; however, Deakins was written out of the series at the end of the 2005–2006 season, at Sheridan's request. His character was replaced by Capt. Danny Ross, played by Eric Bogosian.

Sheridan played alongside Jane Seymour in the Hallmark Channel movie Dear Prudence as Detective Eddie Duncan. On November 6, 2008, Sheridan guest starred as an evening news anchor on the ABC dramedy Eli Stone.

From 2009 to 2010, Sheridan starred in NBC's Trauma as Dr. Joseph "Joe" Saviano. In 2010, Sheridan starred in the movie Handsome Harry, a drama. He played speechwriter Mark Salter in the political film Game Change.

In fall 2011, Sheridan played Vice President William Walden in the first season of Showtime's drama/thriller Homeland; the show was renewed for a second season consisting of 12 episodes, with Sheridan returning as a regular.

In the fall of 2012, Sheridan signed on to play a recurring role on CW's Arrow, playing Robert Queen, Oliver Queen's father. He appears in seasons one, three, five, and seven, mainly through flashbacks.

Sheridan played Jim Sullivan in the 2015 film Spotlight.

== Personal life ==
Sheridan and his wife, actress Colette Kilroy, have three children. They live in Los Angeles.

== Filmography ==
=== Film ===
Year	Title	Role	Notes
1986	Jumpin' Jack Flash	N.Y. Officer	
1988	Distant Thunder	Moss	
1988	The House on Carroll Street	Porter	
1990	Stanley & Iris	Joe	
1990	Quick Change	Mugger	
1991	Talent for the Game	Tim Weaver	
1991	All I Want for Christmas	Michael O'Fallon	
1992	Whispers in the Dark	Doug McDowell	
1992	A Stranger Among Us	Nick	
1994	Sherwood's Travels	Robert Sherwood	
1997	Wild America	Marty Stouffer Sr.	
1997	The Ice Storm	Jim Carver	
1998	Luminous Motion	Dad	
1999	Let the Devil Wear Black	Carl Lyne	
1999	Cradle Will Rock	John Adair	
2000	The Amati Girls	Paul	
2000	The Simian Line	Paul	
2001	Rain	Sheriff Tom Gibson	
2001	Life as a House	Peter Kimball	
2002	Desert Saints	FBI Agent George Scanlon	
2005	Syriana	Terry	
2008	Nothing but the Truth	Oscar Van Doren	
2009	Reunion	Barnaby	
2009	Handsome Harry	Harry Sweeney	
2012	Mea Maxima Culpa: Silence in the House of God	Terry (voice)	Documentary
2013	The East	Richard Cannon	
2015	Spotlight	Jim Sullivan	
2016	Sully	Ben Edwards	
2017	Battle of the Sexes	Ken Rosewall	
2018	Lizzie	Andrew Borden	
2018	Driven	Bill	

=== Television ===
Year	Title	Role	Notes
1981	CBS Children's Mystery Theatre	George	Episode: "Mystery at Fire Island"
1984	St. Elsewhere	Webb Etlee	Episode: "My Arm Is True"
1986	As the World Turns	Stu Ferguson	Episode: "Chris Hughes Passes Away"
1986	One Police Plaza	Detective Bo Davis	TV movie
1987	Spenser: For Hire	Nick Cavanaugh	2 episodes
1987	The Equalizer	Wayne	Episode: "Encounter in a Closed Room"
1989	Shannon's Deal	Jack Shannon	TV movie
1989	A Mother's Courage: The Mary Thomas Story	Brother Ted	TV movie (credited as James Sheridan)
1990–1991	Shannon's Deal	Jack Shannon	11 episodes
1991	Murder in High Places	Horn	TV movie
1993	Picket Fences	Dr. David Williams	Episode: "Fetal Attraction"
1994	The Stand	Randall Flagg	TV Miniseries
1993	Killer Rules	Marco Ponti / Mark Bridges	TV movie
1994	Spring Awakening	Martin	TV movie
1994	My Breast	Nick De Stefano	TV movie
1995–1996	Chicago Hope	Dr. John Sutton	18 episodes
1997	All Lies End in Murder	Danny Scialo	TV movie (credited as James Sheridan)
1997	Veronica's Closet	Bryce Anderson	Episode: "Unaired Pilot"
1998	The Echo of Thunder	Larry Ritchie	TV movie
1998	Beauty	Lee Crompton	TV movie
1999	Ricky Nelson: Original Teen Idol	Ozzie Nelson	TV movie
2000	Now and Again	Ben	2 episodes
2000	Hamlet	Claudius	TV movie
2000	The Lost Child	Jack	TV movie
2001–2006	Law & Order: Criminal Intent	Captain James Deakins	111 episodes
2002	Video Voyeur: The Susan Wilson Story	Steve Glover	TV movie
2007	Babylon Fields	Ernie Wunch	TV movie
2008	Dear Prudence	Eddie Duncan	TV movie
2009	Eli Stone	Sam Russell	Episode: "Mortal Combat"
2009–2010	Trauma	Dr. Joseph Saviano	20 episodes
2010	The League	Ted	Episode: "The Anniversary Party"
2012	Game Change	Mark Salter	TV movie
2011–2012	Homeland	Vice President William Walden	17 episodes
2013	NCIS	Admiral John McGee	Episode: "Squall"
2013	Smash	Richard Francis	5 episodes
2014	Suits	Charles Van Dyke	Episode: "Know When to Fold 'Em"
2012–2019	Arrow	Robert Queen	7 episodes
2015	Agent X	Stanton	10 episodes
2015	Tim & Eric's Bedtime Stories	Dad	Episode: "Tornado"
2016	American Gothic	Mitchell Hawthorne	3 episodes
2018	Ballers		2 episodes
2020	68 Whiskey	General Holloway	Episode: "No Good Deed..."
2021	SEAL Team	Dave Hayes	Episode: "Close to Home"
2022	Grace and Frankie	Jeffrey Purcell	
