= Winnetka Road =

- Genre: Drama; Soap opera
- Created by: John Byrum
- Starring: Catherine Hicks; Ed Begley Jr. Josh Brolin; Kellen Hathaway; Kurt Deutsch; Meg Tilly; Megan Ward; Paige Turco
- Music by: Gary S. Scott
- Country of origin: United States
- Original language: English
- No. of seasons: 1
- No. of episodes: 6 (1 unaired)

Production
- Executive producers: John Byrum; Aaron Spelling; E. Duke Vincent
- Producer: Cheryl R. Stein
- Running time: 60 minutes
- Production companies: Byrum Power & Light; Spelling Television

Original release
- Network: NBC
- Release: March 12 – April 16, 1994

Winnetka Road is an American drama television series that premiered on NBC on March 12, 1994, and concluded on April 16, 1994, after five episodes. The series was created by John Byrum, and follows the lives and loves of an oddly interconnected group of people in a suburban Chicago town.

== Cast and characters ==
Starring

- Ed Begley Jr. as Glenn Barker
- Josh Brolin as Jack Passion
- Kristen Cloke as MayBeth Serlin
- Kurt Deutsch as Kevin Page
- Catherine Hicks as Jeannie Barker
- Meg Tilly as George Grace
- Paige Turco as Terry Mears
- Richard M. Tyson as Dwayne Serlin
- Megan Ward as Nicole Manning

Supporting

- Harley Venton as Stanley "Stan" Oldman
- Richard Herd as Mike
- Jayne Frazer as Patti
- Sandy McPeak as Sterling Grace
- Eddie Bracken as Father Burke
- Richard Gilliland as Jason Peterson

== Episodes ==
No.	Title	Directed by	Written by	Original release date	Prod. code
1	"Townies"	Peter Werner	John Byrum	March 12, 1994	1492003
2	"The White Zone"	Peter Werner	John Byrum	March 19, 1994	2693001
3	"The Real Wisconsin"	Peter Werner	John Byrum	April 2, 1994	2693002
4	"Women in Love"	Melanie Mayron	Meg Tilly	April 9, 1994	2693004
5	"Virtual Reality"	Daniel Attias	John Byrum	April 16, 1994	2693005
6	"Videosity"	N/A	N/A	Unaired	2693003
