= Stan Dragoti =

American film director (1932–2018)

- Born: Stanley John Dragoti; October 4, 1932; New York City, U.S.
- Died: July 13, 2018 (aged 85); Los Angeles, U.S.
- Occupation: Film director
- Spouse: Cheryl Tiegs (m. 1970; div. 1979)

Stanley John Dragoti (October 4, 1932 – July 13, 2018) was an American film director whose work includes the comedies Love at First Bite and Mr. Mom.

== Life ==
Dragoti was born in New York City to Albanian parents, both having emigrated in the 1920s from the district of Tepelenë, in Southern Albania. His interest in cinematography led him to Cooper Union College in New York and later to the Visual Arts College. He also produced ads for the air travel and automobile industry, and directed ads for the I ❤ NY campaign.

Dragoti died on July 13, 2018, in Los Angeles at the age of 85. He underwent open-heart surgery in 2014.

== Filmography ==
Film

- Dirty Little Billy (1972) (Also writer)
- Love at First Bite (1979)
- Mr. Mom (1983)
- The Man with One Red Shoe (1985)
- She's Out of Control (1989)
- Necessary Roughness (1991)

Television

Year	Title	Director	Writer	Notes
1976	McCoy	Yes		Episode: "In and Out Again"
1984	Mr. Mom		Story	TV movie
