= Jules Podell =

Nightclub operator in New York City (1899–1973)

Jules Podell (March 5, 1899 – September 27, 1973) was a former nightclub operator who ran the Copacabana nightclub in New York City. Although it was opened in 1940 by Monte Proser, Podell was put in place by mob boss Frank Costello, Proser's partner. By 1950 Podell was making all the decisions and Proser was gone. Podell ran the club until he died in 1973. George Carlin remarked that he would sit behind his desk & bang the ring on the desk if he didn't like you.

His daughter, Mickey Podell-Raber, has written a book of stories and photographs about her father and life at the famous club.

== In popular culture ==
- Don Stark played Jules Podell in Peter Farrelly's 2018 Academy Award-winning film Green Book.
