= Hi Honey – I'm Dead =

1991 television film directed by Alan Myerson

- Genre: Comedy; Fantasy
- Written by: Carl Kleinschmitt
- Directed by: Alan Myerson
- Starring: Curtis Armstrong; Catherine Hicks; Joseph Gordon-Levitt; Kevin Conroy
- Theme music composer: Roger Bellon
- Country of origin: United States
- Original language: English

Production
- Producer: Paul Rudnick
- Cinematography: James Hayman
- Editor: Gary Karr
- Running time: 92 minutes
- Production companies: Paula Rudnick Productions; FNM Films

Original release
- Network: Fox
- Release: April 22, 1991

Hi Honey – I'm Dead is a 1991 Fox Network made-for-TV film starring Curtis Armstrong and Catherine Hicks.

== Plot summary ==
Brad Stadler is a dishonest real estate developer who spends too much time at work. He cheats on his wife and has no time for son Josh's baseball games. God decides that Brad's time has come. After an accident at his construction site, he is given a new body and identity as Arnold Pischkin. A wisecracking angel named Ralph explains everything to Brad and that he must make up for his sins to go to heaven. Brad has to get used to his new life without money and good looks. He becomes the housekeeper for his widow and son. He becomes a better man by doing many good deeds.

== Cast ==
- Curtis Armstrong as Arnold Pischkin
- Catherine Hicks as Carol Stadler
- Kevin Conroy as Brad Stadler
- Joseph Gordon-Levitt as Josh Stadler
- Robert Briscoe Evans as Noel
- Harvey Jason as Dr. Jahundi
- Jerry Hardin as Cal
- Paul Rodriguez as Ralph, the angel
- Gregory Itzin as Phil
- Carole Androsky as Wife Mourner
- Andre Rosey Brown as Guard
- Betty Carvalho as Maria
- Wendy Cutler as Newsperson
- Andy Goldberg as Caterer
