= Seriously Weird =

- Created by: Kirstie Falkous
- Starring: Ryan Cartwright; Lucinda Davis; Ricky Mabe
- Country of origin: Canada
- No. of episodes: 26

Production
- Running time: 25 minutes
- Production companies: CinéGroupe; Granada Kids

Original release
- Release: September 7, 2002

Seriously Weird is a TV show that played on YTV in Canada. In the UK it was shown on ITV, in the US it was shown on Starz Encore WAM!, and in Australia it was shown on the ABC weekly show Rollercoaster.

== Introduction ==
The show revolves around the misadventures of three teenagers in Draper High School in upstate New York. Harris Pembleton (Ryan Cartwright), a new arrival from England, becomes a magnet for all that is weird after he disrespects Steve, the Ruler of The Weird Dimension. He befriends locals Fenella Day (Lucinda Davis) and Hugo Short (Ricky Mabe).

== Episodes ==
Season 1

- "When Gods Get Angry" – 7 September 2002
- "When Harris Stopped Breathing" – 14 September 2002. After an unfortunate football-related accident, Harris' heart stops, leaving him living-impaired, if only for a few minutes. After being brought back to life however, he soon discovers that fewer and fewer people are noticing him, and that he may soon cease to exist altogether.
- "When Yoghurt Attacks" – 21 September 2002
- "When Eggs Go Bad" – 28 September 2002
- "When Fairies Get Mad" – 5 October 2002. Harris intends to have a night in with his friends, but fairies soon arrive to make trouble.
- "When Harris Stopped Sleeping" – 12 October 2002. Harris is prevented from sleeping by a motivational speaker so he can study all night for an upcoming test. However, all the things he would have dreamt about manifest themselves in the real world.
- "Gnome Sweet Gnome" – 19 October 2002. Harris wants to become chair of his school's social committee, but a group of gnomes want to him to be their leader.
- "Tug of Love"
- "Demon Dog": Harris becomes possessed by the spirit of a demon dog.
- "When Harris Beat the Weird"
- "When Clones Go Bad"
- "Space Ponies"
- "Season Finale"

Season 2

- "When Pyramids Were Square"
- "Puppet Master": An accident means Harris is able to control his brother Justin's body, an opportunity he uses to humiliate his brother.
- "Weird Brothers"
- "The Cheat"
- "Golem My Dreams"
- "When Harris Made a Boo Boo"
- "When Harris Met the Hole"
- "When Charms Cause Harm"
- "Harris and the Mermaid"
- "When Harris Bugged Out"
- "When Harris Got His Groove Back"
- "Ghost Train"
- "When Harris Broke Out"
