= Ryan Cartwright =

English actor (born 1981)

- Born: 14 March 1981 (age 45); Birmingham, West Midlands, England
- Occupation: Actor
- Years active: 1997–present

Ryan Cartwright (born 14 March 1981) is an English actor.

== Early life ==
Cartwright was born in Erdington, Birmingham, West Midlands. His older brother is Che Cartwright, who is also an actor.

== Career ==
He began acting with the Central Junior Television Workshop. His first major role came at the age of 15 in the British ITV comedy-drama The Grimleys. He has also appeared in such other British television programmes as Seriously Weird, Hardware, Donovan, Microsoap, Look Around You and All About Me.

Since moving to the US, Cartwright had a recurring role on the television series Bones as the laboratory intern Vincent Nigel-Murray, until the death of his character in the season 6 episode The Hole in the Heart. He also completed filming a Hallmark Channel television film, Dear Prudence alongside Jane Seymour, in which he used an American accent. He had a recurring role (as upper class Briton John Hooker) on season 3 of Mad Men, for which he, as part of Mad Men's ensemble cast, won the Screen Actors Guild Award for Outstanding Performance by an Ensemble in a Drama Series in 2009.

He played Gary Bell, an autistic character, on the Syfy television series Alphas (2011–2012). To prepare for the role, Cartwright consulted with people who worked with autistic people, watched documentaries, read blogs created by autistic people, and books from autistic authors, such as Temple Grandin and Daniel Tammet. Cartwright's portrayal of Bell has earned praise from the neurological science community, crediting his complexity for eschewing stereotypes of autism previously displayed in mass media.

In September 2016, Cartwright began a main role in the CBS sitcom Kevin Can Wait as Chale Witt. On 12 May 2018, the series was canceled after two seasons.

He currently appears in a recurring role as Kyle on the HBO Max series Stuart Fails to Save the Universe. After airing only four episodes, HBO Max announced a second-season pickup.

== Personal life ==
Cartwright relocated to Los Angeles in 2006.

== Filmography ==
=== Film ===
Year	Title	Role	Notes
2007	Virgin Territory	Ghino	
2011	Sironia	Nick	
2015	Vacation	Terry	
2016	Independence Day: Resurgence	David's Assistant	
2017	Father Figures	Liam O’Callaghan	
2026	All That Glisters	Gabe	

=== Television ===
Year	Title	Role	Notes
1997, 1999–2001	The Grimleys	Darren Grimley	Main cast, 22 episodes
1997	Dangerfield	Ian Thomson	Episode: "Contact"
1998	Microsoap	David	
2000	Doctors	Henry Lincoln	Episode: "Cheated"
2002	All About Me	Peter	
2002	Seriously Weird	Harris Pembleton	Main cast
2003–2004	Hardware	Steve	
2004–2006	DNA	Seth Donovan	3 episodes
2004	The Legend of The Tamworth Two	Butch (voice)	TV movie
2005	Look Around You	Sam McNamara	Episode: "Live Final"
2005	Twenty Thousand Streets Under the Sky	Rex	
2008	Dear Prudence	Nigel Forsythe III	TV film
2008–2011	Bones	Vincent Nigel-Murray	Recurring character, 11 episodes
2009	Mad Men	John Hooker	Recurring character, 5 episodes
2011–2012	Alphas	Gary Bell	Main cast, 24 episodes
2012	The Big Bang Theory	Cole	Episode: "The 43 Peculiarity"
2014	Warehouse 13	Oswald	Episode: "A Faire to Remember"
2014	Mom	Jeff Taylor	4 episodes
2015	Truth Be Told	Josh	Episode: "Psychic Chicken"
2016–2018	Kevin Can Wait	Chale Witt	Main cast, 48 episodes
2019	Fam	David	Episode: "This is Fam"
2020	Bob Hearts Abishola	David	Episode: "On a Dead Guy's Bench"
2022	B Positive	Asher	2 episodes
2022	9-1-1: Lone Star	Max Keller	2 episodes
2026	Stuart Fails to Save the Universe	Kyle	Recurring character
