= Shannon's Deal =

- Genre: Legal drama
- Created by: John Sayles
- Starring: Jamey Sheridan; Elizabeth Peña; Jenny Lewis; Richard Edson; Miguel Ferrer; Martin Ferrero
- Theme music composer: Wynton Marsalis
- Country of origin: United States
- Original language: English
- No. of series: 2
- No. of episodes: 14 + TV movie

Production
- Executive producer: Stan Rogow
- Producer: John Sayles
- Running time: 48 minutes
- Production companies: Stan Rogow Productions; NBC Productions

Original release
- Network: NBC
- Release: April 16, 1990 – May 21, 1991

Shannon's Deal is an American legal drama that aired on NBC from April 16, 1990, until May 21, 1991. The series was created by John Sayles and executive produced by Stan Rogow. The show centers on a successful Philadelphia corporate lawyer named Jack Shannon (Jamey Sheridan), who lost his family and his job to a compulsive gambling habit. The saga of Shannon, who leaves a prestigious law firm after years of becoming unhappy with the legal system and being forced to take his clients to court, and who subsequently opens his own low-rent practice, was first explored in the highly rated, two-hour movie pilot, which NBC aired on June 4, 1989, and repeated April 13, 1990, ahead of the series premiere.

The series was highly regarded in the industry for its level of writing, complex character development, and witty dramedy elements, but is also remembered for the notable people who worked behind the scenes.

== Synopsis ==
The premise of the show was perhaps summed up best by the following opening narration given by Jack Shannon in the title sequence:

I thought I was a big shot. Big money, big house, big car...I thought I held all the cards. I thought I could pick the winner every time, I thought I could smell it...but the whole thing was built on garbage. I treated my wife badly and I knew it and I didn't stop, and one day she walked. She took my daughter with her. I started gambling big time, crazy stuff, long-shot stuff. I turned into the kind of man that I'd grown up hating. Making the big bucks and being made a partner wasn't enough to buy that off. I'm just kinda starting from scratch, trying to keep things low pressure.

Though he worked hard to attain a high-profile partnership at the prestigious Philadelphia law firm of Coleman and Weiss, John F. "Jack" Shannon grew disillusioned from successfully defending corporations in pollution cases. (He later ruefully referred to a stretch of land that had been used as a toxic dump by one of those companies as "Shannon Park".) As a consequence, his marriage fell apart and Shannon became a compulsive gambler. Racking up massive debts, Shannon lost his house, his car, and other assets. He was then fired from his position at the firm, following a disastrous confrontation with fellow partner Todd Spurrier.

Though he maintained a good relationship with his teenaged daughter Neala (Jenny Lewis), Shannon found himself starting over with his own small firm in a low-rent Philadelphia building filled with low-rent professionals, including lawyers like ambulance-chaser Lou Gondolf (Martin Ferrero). He also found himself going up against his old adversary Todd Spurrier (Miguel Ferrer), who had moved to the DA's office to lay the groundwork for a political career. Though he gained a loyal assistant in Lucy Acosta (Elizabeth Peña) when he freed her boyfriend from a wrongful charge, he quickly discovered that practicing law was now a far different venture, as he worked cases involving crime, corruption, and corporate greed from the other side without the vast resources of his old law firm.

Shannon gained another unlikely ally in Wilmer Slade (Richard Edson), a former welterweight boxer turned enforcer for one of the many loan sharks to whom Jack is in debt. Always striving for self-improvement through vocabulary studies and night school, Wilmer eagerly took on the role of investigator for Shannon when needed. Shannon's skill as an attorney was only matched by his flair as a poker player with an uncanny ability to deal himself a winning hand more often than not. Now Shannon relies on that same talent to work out deals for his clients without having to go to court.

Shannon's Deal explored various aspects of the law as Jack took on police and government corruption, union disputes, child custody, the murky underside of creative ownership in the music business, and even the viability of the church as sanctuary for an illegal immigrant. Lucy soon broke up with her boyfriend, and there remained an undercurrent of attraction between Jack and Lucy throughout the series that was never fully realized. Shannon continued to battle his gambling addiction, even as he used his poker skills to help work out his cases.

== Cast and characters ==
- Jamey Sheridan as Jack Shannon
- Elizabeth Peña as Lucy Acosta
- Richard Edson as Wilmer Slade
- Jenny Lewis as Neala Shannon

== Episodes ==
=== Season 1 (1990) ===
No. overall	No. in season	Title	Directed by	Written by	Original release date
Movie	0	"Shannon's Deal" "Pilot"	Lewis Teague	John Sayles	June 4, 1989
1	1	"Words to Music"	Allan Arkush	John Sayles	April 16, 1990
2	2	"Inside Straight"	Allan Arkush	Story by : Stan Rogow & Mark Rosner; Teleplay by : Mark Rosner	April 23, 1990
3	3	"Art"	David Greenwalt	Story by : Stan Rogow & David Greenwalt; Teleplay by : David Greenwalt	April 30, 1990
4	4	"Custody"	Joel Oliansky	John Sayles	May 7, 1990
5	5	"Hitting Home"	Aaron Lipstadt	Tom Rickman	May 8, 1990
6	6	"Sanctuary"	John Byrum	John Byrum	May 16, 1990

=== Season two (1991) ===
No. overall	No. in season	Title	Directed by	Written by	Original release date
7	1	"The Bad Beat"	Eugene Corr	Eugene Corr & Ruth Shapiro	March 23, 1991
8	2	"Greed"	Allan Arkush	David Greenwalt	April 9, 1991
9–10	3–4	"Wrongful Death" "Strangers in the Night"	Tom Rickman	Tom Rickman	April 16, 1991
11	5	"First Amendment"	Allan Arkush	Barry Pullman	April 23, 1991
12	6	"The Inside Man"	Corey Blechman	Corey Blechman	April 30, 1991
13	7	"Matrimony"	Betty Thomas	Kathy McCormick	May 14, 1991
14	8	"Trouble"	Joan Tewkesbury	Joan Tewkesbury	May 21, 1991

== Production and development ==
Shannon's Deal was based in part on the experiences of executive producer Stan Rogow as a lawyer in the 1970s. Representing poor people, Rogow never wanted to go to court because he knew he would lose going up against corporate law firms with huge resources. Later getting into the film industry, Rogow met and worked with writer-director John Sayles, who had met with NBC Entertainment president Brandon Tartikoff in 1987 and pitched a story about a lawyer who avoids going to court, on a number of other projects before suggesting they work together to create a new TV series. The pilot movie, written by Sayles and aired on NBC on June 4, 1989, introduced an element of film noir that continued throughout the series. This was further enhanced by a haunting jazz score for the pilot by Wynton Marsalis, who also provided the theme music. Sayles received a 1990 Edgar Award for his screenplay for the pilot. Once the show got picked up as a series, Sayles directed one of the episodes, and had a cameo appearance in the "Words to Music" episode as a jealous boyfriend who gets into a confrontation with Shannon.

The show took a cynical view of the legal system, as Sayles told Entertainment Weekly: "Shannon's a fixer. There are very few clear-cut victories in his life, and one of the few he gets is that his clients don't go to court. You can like Shannon, but you can't always come away thinking that [he] did the right thing or [he] won this one."

== Broadcast ==
Shannon's Deal was picked up as a regular series after the ratings success of the TV movie. On Friday, April 13, 1990, NBC reaired the movie pilot at 9/8C, and the following Monday at 10/9C, the series officially premiered. Counting the movie pilot as the first two episodes, the show initially ran a small spring season of eight episodes. NBC changed its timeslot around a few times during this run, but the ratings were not too adversely affected, so a second season was awarded to the show. The series did not return with new episodes until Sunday, March 23, 1991, followed by its permanent move to Tuesdays at 10/9C in the first week of April. The new timeslot, coupled with NBC putting off the new season for many months, caused a massive ratings decline. After the last completed episode of the second season aired on May 21, 1991, Shannon's Deal was cancelled. A total of 14 episodes aired, along with the original television film.

== Reception ==
=== Critical response ===
Entertainment Weekly gave the show a "B" rating and Ken Tucker wrote, "Right now, Shannon's Deal remains an intriguing show with first-rate acting by Sheridan and Peña, but they could use some behind-the-scenes help". In his review for The New York Times, John J. O'Connor wrote, "For the 1930s, Dashiell Hammett created Sam Spade, the private eye. With Jack. the Philadelphia lawyer, Mr. Sayles, the film maker and writer (Matewan, Eight Men Out), gets a crystal-clear bead on the 1990s". In his review for the Los Angeles Times, Don Shirley wrote, "Sayles scores points for making Shannon less than a shining white knight and for creating a gallery of interesting and sometimes amusing subsidiary characters," but felt that "Some of those characters, however, are developed more predictably than we might expect from Sayles".

=== Awards and nominations ===
Year	Award	Category	Recipient	Result
1990	Casting Society of America Award	Best Casting for TV, Dramatic Episodic	Peg Halligan	Nominated
1990	TCA Award	Outstanding Achievement in Drama	Shannon's Deal	Nominated
1991	Environmental Media Award	TV Drama	"Inside Man"	Won
1991	Primetime Emmy Award	Outstanding Achievement in Graphic Design and Title Sequences	Ed Sullivan, Jeff Boortz and Scott Milne	Nominated
