= DNA (British TV series) =

2004 British TV crime drama

- Also known as: Donovan
- Genre: Crime drama
- Written by: Mike Cullen; Charlie Fletcher
- Directed by: Simon Delaney; Ciaran Donnelly
- Starring: Tom Conti; Samantha Bond; Ryan Cartwright; Amelia Bullmore; Dan Fredenburgh
- Composer: Mark Russell
- Country of origin: United Kingdom
- Original language: English
- No. of series: 2
- No. of episodes: 5

Production
- Executive producers: Mike Cullen; Andy Harries
- Producer: Spencer Campbell
- Production locations: Manchester, England, UK
- Running time: 60 minutes
- Production company: Granada Television

Original release
- Network: ITV
- Release: 5 January 2004 – 19 May 2006

DNA (originally broadcast as DoNovAn) is a British television crime drama, first broadcast on ITV in 2004, starring Tom Conti and Samantha Bond as the main protagonists, Joe and Kate Donovan. Two series were produced – the first of which is a two-part story – and the second, aired in 2006, which features three, unrelated, entirely different cases. The initial series follows the work of Donovan, a retired police forensic pathologist, whose life is turned upside down after being called to a crime scene, only to find his own name scrawled on the wall in blood by the victim. In the second series, Donovan comes out of retirement to head up the FIU (Forensics Investigation Unit).

The first series was released on DVD in the UK on 18 May 2009. Despite the blurb, this only contains the two-part first series, not all five episodes as stated. A complete box set containing both series was previously released in the US on 13 May 2008.

== Cast ==
- Tom Conti as Joe Donovan
- Samantha Bond as Kate Donovan
- Ryan Cartwright as Seth Donovan
- Malcolm Scates as Michael Kinsley (Series 1)
- Indira Varma as Cara Mathis (Series 1)
- Amelia Bullmore as Evie Strauss (Series 2)
- Dan Fredenburgh as Nick Pushko (Series 2)
- Katie Blake as Myrna Rovic (Series 2)

== Episode list ==
=== Series 1 (2004) ===
No.	Title	Directed by	Written by	British air date	UK viewers (million)
1	"DNA (Part 1)"	Simon Delaney	Mike Cullen	5 January 2004	8.41m
Retired forensic pathologist Joe Donovan is called upon when his name is found scrawled in blood by a murder victim, who appears to have been attacked in the same manner as the last case that Donovan investigated before his retirement. However, when his DNA is later found at the crime scene, the police suspect that he may have been responsible for the murder.
2	"DNA (Part 2)"	Simon Delaney	Mike Cullen	6 January 2004	7.66m
Certain that the evidence against him has been planted, Donovan tries to discover who would set out to try and frame him. However, concerned about a series of infrequent mental blackouts that he is suffering from, Donovan begins to wonder if he really was responsible for murder – a suspicion which is later intensified when he awakes from a blackout to find himself beside another victim.

=== Series 2 (2005–2006) ===
The final episode of the series was due to be shown on 24 July 2005 but was postponed because the storyline contained elements involving terrorism, which was deemed to be insensitive following two terrorist attacks in London just weeks previously.

No.	Title	Directed by	Written by	British air date	UK viewers (million)
3	"The Intended Target"	Ciaran Donnelly	Mike Cullen	10 July 2005	6.01m
Now back as senior scientist in the Forensic Investigations Unit, Donovan doggedly pursues a serial killer who takes pretty blonde women as his victims. He thinks he knows not only the killer, but also the next target--Sharon Page, a pub owner looking for more from Donovan than merely protection.
4	"Love and Wealth"	Ciaran Donnelly	Mike Cullen	17 July 2005	N/A
Donovan and the team investigate the murder of a wealthy aristocrat who appears to have been attacked during a bungled robbery at his home.
5	"The Virus"	Ciaran Donnelly	Charlie Fletcher	19 May 2006	3.92m
Donovan and the team are called in to investigate a plane from Africa which is believed to be carrying a fatal bug that is killing the passengers. A senior officer from MI5 is in charge of the operation and he blames a secret prisoner on board for the outbreak. Seth thinks the man's life is in danger and he tries to help him escape – but the attempt ends in the captive's death.
