= Dear Prudence (2008 film) =

- Opening title card of film
- Created by: Les Alexander; Rob Gilmer
- Starring: Jane Seymour; Ryan Cartwright; Tantoo Cardinal; Jamey Sheridan; Rob Stewart; James Kot
- Country of origin: United States

Original release
- Network: Hallmark Channel
- Release: August 23, 2008

Dear Prudence is a Hallmark Channel original made-for-TV movie starring Jane Seymour. The movie premiered August 23, 2008, and was to be a pilot that would become a part of the Hallmark Channel Mystery Wheel. A sequel Perfectly Prudence aired on January 8, 2011.

== Plot summary ==
Prudence Macintyre (Jane Seymour) is the host of the fictitious hit "do-it-yourself" television show Dear Prudence giving out 'Pru Pointers' to her viewers. The film opens with Pru recording a point on how to water plants whilst away, by filling a bucket of water, tying one end of some cotton twine around a brick and the other end is pushed into the plant pot. When the brick is left in the bucket, the water will work its way up the cotton into the plant pot. As she yawns through the segment, she is interrupted by her boss who insists that she take the company jet and fly to his lodge in Wyoming for the week to rest.

Arriving at the airport, Pru is met by Ruth (Tantoo Cardinal) who shows her around the location and to sacred ground. The lodge is built on the last remnant of Indian land preserved by the Andrews family. Whilst Ruth is discussing plans to commemorate Bart Andrews' death to celebrate all his previous work, Bart's son Jean Phillipe Andrews arrives with his land trust lawyer Doug Craig.

She gets involved in a murder investigation with her assistant Nigel. Along the way she provides helpful household tips and tricks that irk the lead investigating officer (Jamey Sheridan). But her forensic-type skills help solve the case.

== Cast ==
- Jane Seymour as Prudence Macintyre
- Jamey Sheridan as Eddie Duncan
- Ryan Cartwright as Nigel Forsythe III

== Reception ==
The New York Daily News gave the film 3 out of 5 stars, and said that Seymour was part of a "sweet formula." They also stated that Seymour and Sheridan are "a pleasure to watch."
