= Love at First Bite =

1979 American comedy horror film by Stan Dragoti

- Theatrical release poster
- Directed by: Stan Dragoti
- Screenplay by: Robert Kaufman
- Story by: Robert Kaufman; Mark Gindes
- Produced by: Joel Freeman
- Starring: George Hamilton; Susan Saint James; Richard Benjamin; Dick Shawn; Arte Johnson
- Cinematography: Edward Rosson
- Edited by: Mort Fallick; Allan Jacobs
- Music by: Charles Bernstein
- Production company: Melvin Simon Productions
- Distributed by: American International Pictures
- Release date: April 6, 1979
- Running time: 94 minutes
- Country: United States
- Language: English
- Budget: $3 million
- Box office: $43,900,000

Love at First Bite is a 1979 American comedy horror film directed by Stan Dragoti and written by Robert Kaufman, using characters originally created by Bram Stoker. It stars George Hamilton, Susan Saint James, Richard Benjamin, and Arte Johnson. The film's plot details the misadventures of Count Dracula in New York City while pursuing the object of his romantic desires, fashion model Cindy Sondheim, only to find himself a fish out of water in the Big Apple and having to contend with the inimical attentions of Cindy's would-be boyfriend.

The original music score was composed by Charles Bernstein. The film's tagline is: "Your favorite pain in the neck is about to bite your funny bone!" An earlier version of the script by director Richard Rush was titled Dracula Sucks Again.

The film's success revived Hamilton's career.

== Plot ==
The infamous vampire Count Dracula is expelled from his castle by the Communist government of Romania, which plans to convert it into a training facility for gymnasts (including Nadia Comăneci). The world-weary Count travels to New York City with his bug-eating manservant, Renfield, and establishes himself in a hotel, only after an airport transport mix-up accidentally sends his coffin to be the centerpiece at a funeral in a black church in Harlem. While Dracula learns that late 1970s America contains such wonders as blood banks, sex clubs, and discotheques, the Count also proceeds to suffer the general ego-crushing that comes from life in the Big Apple when he romantically pursues flaky fashion model Cindy Sondheim. He has admired her from afar, believing her to be the current reincarnation of his true love (a previous reincarnation having been Mina Harker).

Dracula is ineptly pursued in turn by Cindy's psychiatrist and quasi-boyfriend Jeffrey Rosenberg, who is the grandson of Dracula's old nemesis Fritz van Helsing and changed his name to Rosenberg "for professional reasons". Rosenberg's numerous methods to combat Dracula (mirrors, garlic, a Star of David in place of a cross, and hypnosis) are easily averted by the Count. Rosenberg also tries burning Dracula's coffin with the vampire still inside, but he is arrested by hotel security. Subsequently he tries to shoot Dracula with silver bullets, but the Count remains unscathed, patiently explaining that this works only on werewolves. Rosenberg's increasingly erratic actions eventually cause him to be locked away as a lunatic. As mysterious cases of blood-bank robberies and vampiric attacks begin to spread, NYPD Lieutenant Ferguson starts to believe the psychiatrist's claims and gets Rosenberg released.

As a major blackout hits the city, Dracula flees with Cindy via taxi cab back to the airport, pursued by Rosenberg and Ferguson. His coffin is accidentally sent to Jamaica instead of London, and the couple miss their flight. On the runway, Cindy finally agrees to become Dracula's vampire bride. Rosenberg attempts to stake Dracula, but as he moves in for the kill, Dracula and Cindy fly away. A check falls from the sky, by which Cindy pays off her enormous psychiatry bill owed to Rosenberg. Rosenberg keeps Dracula's cape (the only thing his stake struck), which Ferguson borrows, hoping it will help him look stylish on his wedding anniversary. Dracula and Cindy, transformed into bats, fly toward Jamaica.

== Cast ==
- George Hamilton as Count Vladimir Dracula
- Susan Saint James as Cindy Sondheim
- Richard Benjamin as Dr. Jeffrey Rosenberg/Van Helsing
- Dick Shawn as Lieutenant Ferguson
- Arte Johnson as Renfield
- Ronnie Schell as Guy in Elevator
- Isabel Sanford as Judge R. Thomas
- Sherman Hemsley as Reverend Mike
- Barry Gordon as Flashlight Vendor
- Bob Basso as TV Repairman
- Bryan O'Byrne as Priest
- Ralph Manza as Limo Driver
- Michael Pataki as Mobster
- Susan Tolsky as Model Agent

== Production ==
The inspiration for the film came about when George Hamilton met Harold Sonny Van Arnem and together they met with screenwriter Robert Kaufman and agreed to produce the film with poolside impressions of Bela Lugosi, and thoughts turned to what would happen if Dracula lived in modern New York City. Van Arnem contracted directly with Kaufman to write a script based on the combined thoughts from Hamilton, Kaufman, and Van Arnem. Van Arnem paid Robert Kaufman $25,000 to write the script. The initial script was titled Dracula Sucks Again and was owned exclusively by Van Arnem until it was sold to Melvin Simon, a shopping-mall entrepreneur with an interest in films who agreed to finance the film production. Director Stan Dragoti became attached to the project through Peter Sellers, an acquaintance of Kaufman.

== Release ==
The film opened in Detroit in conjunction with the Detroit Express pro soccer opening season in March 1979 at the Silverdome in Pontiac, Michigan. The film then opened in 88 theaters in Chicago, Philadelphia and San Francisco on April 6, 1979. It expanded the following weekend into another 134 theaters in nine cities, including New York and Boston.

== Home media ==
The film was first released on VHS in 1981 by Warner Home Video, again on June 16, 1993 from Orion Home Video, and finally on DVD, July 12, 2005, from MGM. On the later VHS and DVD releases, the song played during the disco scene, "I Love the Nightlife" by Alicia Bridges, was removed and replaced with a different song. Shout! Factory released the film in February 2015 on Blu-ray Disc (with the original disco song by Bridges intact) as a double feature with Once Bitten (1985), the audio enhanced to 5.1 surround sound on both features.

== Reception ==
The film was a financial success, grossing $2,136,923 in its first 10 days. It went on to gross $44 million against a $3 million budget and ranking at number 13 on a list of the top grossing films of 1979. (Or rentals of $20.6 million).)

It was AIP's highest-grossing film until the release of The Amityville Horror later in the year. It was one of the highest-grossing independent films for many years. Critical reviews at the time were mixed, however. Love at First Bite has a 75% rating at the film review aggregator website Rotten Tomatoes, based on 20 reviews with the site's consensus reading: "Love At First Bite could use some more warm-blooded barbs to liven up its undead comedy, but George Hamilton's campy charisma gives the prince of darkness some welcome pizazz".

Janet Maslin of The New York Times described Love as "[a] coarse, delightful little movie with a bang-up cast and no pretensions at all," while Dave Kehr lamented the film's "hodgepodge of flat one-liners and graceless slapstick." Variety noted a "tendency to lurch from joke to joke" and observed that the story may be "silly," but Hamilton "makes it work. In the first place, he's funny just to watch." Gene Siskel of the Chicago Tribune gave the film zero stars out of four, writing that Hamilton "has no idea how to play comedy" and gave "a smug performance in a film full of tired jokes and some of the most cruel racial stereotyping you'll ever see." Charles Champlin of the Los Angeles Times wrote, "It is not quite the coupling of the decade, and Ms. St. James, although sympathetic, looks occasionally distracted, as if she were expecting a phone call at any minute. But Hamilton, baying 'Children of de night, shawt opp' at the baying wolves outside, has all the energy the movie needs. His characterization, grandly sweeping, sincere, preposterous but solemn, is just right." Gary Arnold of The Washington Post suggested that the film "was evidently contrived by funnymen who started to run short of gags right after thinking up the title," also observing that Susan Saint James "doesn't even seem to be trying" and that "Hamilton does an acceptable vocal impression of Bela Lugosi, but the act may have been more amusing when he was just doing it for friends." Tom Milne of The Monthly Film Bulletin compared the film to the work of Mel Brooks and opined that it had "fewer belly-laughs than Young Frankenstein" but was "more consistent in its humour, partly because it pays more attention to character ... but chiefly because it adheres to its aim of producing 'a comedic Dracula, rather than a comical one.'"

=== Accolades ===
Year	Award / Film festival	Category	Recipient(s)	Result
1979	Saturn Awards	Best Horror Film		Nominated
1979	Saturn Awards	Best Writing	Robert Kaufman	Nominated
1979	Saturn Awards	Best Actor	George Hamilton	Won
1979	Saturn Awards	Best Actress	Susan Saint James	Nominated
1979	Saturn Awards	Best Supporting Actor	Arte Johnson	Won
1979	Saturn Awards	Best Make-up	William J. Tuttle	Won
1980	Golden Globes	Best Actor – Musical or Comedy	George Hamilton	Nominated

== Sequel ==
Hamilton purchased the film's copyright from Melvin Simon Productions and has been very eager to make a sequel. In 2009, he stated:

It's terrific. It's all about old world school of Dracula in the Bela Lugosi 1940s up against the Twilight felons with humor, It's hard to do but it's great fun. I think Twilight is a wonderful series of books. It's so important for these young girls with hormonal changes and this love that's worth giving your life for. But now I have to find a way to bring my Love at First Bite character into that kind of story and make it funny and not be at all like Twilight and I think I found a way to do that.

He later elaborated about the plot:

His [my character's] son is a sort of perennial student in California and he doesn't want to acknowledge his father, Dracula, at all and he's getting married into a family of televangelists. {Laughs} He met this girl that he's in love with who's a zoologist in a cave somewhere; he was a bat in this cave in South America. So now, Dracula's forced himself to come to Hollywood for this big wedding and bring all of his relatives who are pretty ridiculous people. There's a wonderful scene at the bachelor party in a strip club, it's great stuff.

To date, a sequel has not gone into production.

== See also ==
- Vampire film
