= Heart Beat (film) =

1980 film by John Byrum

- Early 1990s VHS cover
- Directed by: John Byrum
- Written by: Screenplay: John Byrum; Autobiography/source: Carolyn Cassady
- Produced by: Michael Shamberg; Alan Greisman; David Axelrod; Edward R. Pressman
- Starring: Nick Nolte; Sissy Spacek; John Heard
- Cinematography: László Kovács
- Edited by: Eric Jenkins
- Music by: Jack Nitzsche
- Color process: Technicolor
- Production company: Orion Pictures
- Distributed by: Warner Bros.
- Release date: April 25, 1980
- Running time: 110 minutes
- Country: United States
- Budget: $3.5 million
- Box office: $954,046

Heart Beat is a 1980 American romantic drama film written and directed by John Byrum, based on the autobiography by Carolyn Cassady. The film is about seminal figures in the Beat Generation. The character of Ira, played by Ray Sharkey, is based on Allen Ginsberg. The film stars Nick Nolte, Sissy Spacek, and John Heard.

The movie received generally mixed reviews, although the soundtrack was met with critical acclaim. According to Box Office Mojo, its worldwide gross receipts were $954,046, making the movie a box office disappointment.

== Plot ==
The film explores the love triangle of real-life characters Neal Cassady, Jack Kerouac, and Carolyn Cassady in the late 1950s and the 1960s. It chronicles Kerouac writing his seminal novel On the Road, and its effect on their lives.

== Cast ==
- Nick Nolte as Neal Cassady
- Sissy Spacek as Carolyn Cassady
- John Heard as Jack Kerouac
- Ray Sharkey as Ira (based on Allen Ginsberg)
- Ann Dusenberry as Stevie
- Margaret Fairchild as Mrs. Kerouac
- John Larroquette as TV Talk Show Host
- David Lynch as Painter
- Tony Bill as Dick
- Don Brodie as Dispatcher

== Production ==
It was one of the first movies from the newly formed Orion Pictures.

The film was produced by Orion Pictures, but was released by Warner Bros. Warner Bros. disliked the film and didn't consider it commercial enough. A marketing memo issued a strategy—"Punt." The film was dumped into theaters with little fanfare, despite the earlier excitement generated by Orion's pre-production announcements and the much ballyhooed casting of Nick Nolte as his star was rising after role in the television smash hit "Rich Man, Poor Man."

Beat Legend William S. Burroughs visited the set one day, and wrote about it in Rolling Stone magazine, feeling "the past hung in the air" due to the realism in the film. When sitting with Nick Nolte who played Neal, Burroughs "felt Neal sitting there in his cheap 1950s suit with the sleeves pulled up."

== Critical reception ==
Roger Ebert of The Chicago Sun-Times gave the film 2½ out of 4 stars and praised certain aspects of the film:

[T]here were long stretches of Heart Beat during which I found myself wishing instead for a film version of On the Road... The movie's a triumph of art direction, all right; the locations, clothes, lighting, moods, music and whole tone of the performances are designed to lower a kind of nostalgic dropcloth over the story... This movie treats its events as so long ago, so finished and done with and bathed in a yellowing afterglow, that we don't sense the very passion and rebelliousness it's supposed to be about. What an irony for the first serious film about the Beats.

Audiences polled by CinemaScore gave the film an average grade of "C" on an A+ to F scale.

== Musical score and soundtrack ==
Heart Beat

Soundtrack album by Jack Nitzsche
- Released: 1980
- Recorded: 1979
- Genre: Jazz
- Labels: Capitol; SOO 12029
- Producer: Jack Nitzsche

The score was composed by Jack Nitzsche, and included the song "I Love Her, Too" with lyrics by John Byrum and Buffy Sainte-Marie and sung by Aaron Neville. The soundtrack prominently featured saxophonist Art Pepper and other West Coast jazz musicians, with the soundtrack album released on the Capitol label.

=== Track listing ===
All compositions by Jack Nitzsche except where noted.

1. "On the Road" – 3:16
2. "Carolyn's Theme" – 1:53
3. "Adagio for Strings" – 1:58
4. "Three Americans" – 1:19
5. "Jack's Theme" – 1:39
6. "The World Is Waiting for the Sunrise" (Ernest Seitz, Gene Lockhart) – 2:10
7. "I Love Her Too" (Jack Nitzsche, Buffy Sainte-Marie, John Byrum) – 3:50
8. "Carolyn" – 3:18
9. "Jam" – 2:28
10. "Neal's Theme" – 1:55
11. "901" – 3:01
12. "Heart Beat" – 1:42

=== Personnel ===
- Art Pepper – alto saxophone solos (tracks 1, 4, 5 & 9–11)
- Conte Candoli – trumpet
- Bud Shank – alto saxophone, flute
- Bob Cooper – tenor saxophone, oboe
- Pete Jolly – piano
- Max Bennett – bass
- Shelly Manne – drums
- Shorty Rogers – arranger
- Bob Enevoldsen – trombone
- Tommy Tedesco – guitar
- Frank Capp – drums
- Emil Richards – percussion
- Aaron Neville – vocals (track 7)
- Les Paul and Mary Ford – guitar and vocals (track 6)
- Unidentified Orchestra conducted by Alan Broadbent
