= The Whoopee Boys =

- VHS cover
- Directed by: John Byrum
- Written by: Steve Zacharias; Jeff Buhai; David Obst
- Produced by: Adam Fields; Peter MacGregor-Scott
- Starring: Michael O'Keefe; Paul Rodriguez; Denholm Elliott
- Cinematography: Ralf D. Bode
- Edited by: Eric Jenkins
- Music by: Udi Harpaz; Jack Nitzsche
- Distributed by: Paramount Pictures
- Release date: August 22, 1986
- Running time: 88 minutes
- Language: English
- Budget: $8 million
- Box office: $444,746

The Whoopee Boys is a 1986 American comedy film directed by John Byrum and starring Michael O'Keefe and Paul Rodriguez. It was made by the writers and the producers of the 1984 hit film Revenge of the Nerds.

== Plot ==
Two dim-witted street peddlers, Jake Bateman and Barney Bonar, have grown tired of the frozen weather of the north. They head to a company where drivers are hired to transport vehicles. When they are denied driving a Cadillac to Palm Beach, Florida, Jake flirts with the company's owner and threatens to eat her goldfish until she agrees.

Upon arriving in Palm Beach, the duo crash a party held by a rich elderly couple who lost their dog, Ralph. Barney's attempt at befriending a Navy admiral and his wife doesn't go too well while Jake meets Olivia, an heiress who runs a local orphanage. When Jake and Barney leave to find the Cadillac had been towed, Olivia offers to take them in in exchange for help at the orphanage. Olivia and Jake begin to get a little close when she drops a bomb on Jake. She is to be married to someone her uncle approves. Her uncle will only accept those whom he considers "Perfect Gentleman". If she cannot marry in 30 days, she will lose her orphanage to a real estate developer, Strobe, who just also happens to be Olivia's ex-boyfriend who can't seem to let her go. When Jake offers to marry Olivia, she is convinced that Jake is not going to be good enough for her uncle.

Upset, Jake turns to Barney, who suggests they go to a charm school run by Henrietta Phelps, a well known expert in etiquette. Taking the back route to the school, Jake and Barney are joined by the nerdy Eddie Lipschitz, aggressive police officer White, neurotic Shelley, Indian man Roy Rajmataj, and Claudia, the pregnant wife of a Mafia boss. At first, things don't bode well for anyone in the group. One night, Jake and Barney sneak off to a local bar where they find Henrietta's husband Colonel Phelps. The Colonel reveals he is part of a secret society similar to the Illuminati in terms of learning how to be a perfect gentleman. The duo splits their time between the couple, learning proper etiquette from Henrietta while the Colonel has the boys take mock photos with royal figures and government politicians to make themselves established.

Having finished both courses, Jake intends to win back Olivia. However, he must deal with the likes of Strobe and his two right-hand men, Whitey and Tipper. To impress Olivia's uncle, Judge Sternhill, Barney brings in some of his friends from the charm school to help Jake. For instance, Officer White gives Barney a machine gun to help Jake shoot skeet successfully with Barney actually pulling the trigger. When at a party, Jake manages to make Strobe look foolish, the Judge is disappointed with both men and suggests a game called "cross courts", the two get Eddie to join in. However, when Eddie unwittingly confesses to Whitey about charm school, the ruse is up and Olivia is forced to marry Strobe.

At the wedding ceremony, Jake and Barney sneak in while Claudia comes in as a guest. Officer White distracts the priest and "arrests" him. Roy disguises himself as the priest with Eddie posing as an altar boy. When Strobe unveils the bride, it is actually Barney in a wig and totally embarrassing Strobe. Jake and Olivia finally get Sternhill's approval and Strobe is arrested by Officer White. Jake and Olivia drive off while Barney meets two women coming out of the church. The finale sees Judge Sternhill finding Colonel Phelps and they both give off the secret sign that they were both members of the "secret society" that Jake and Barney had become the newest members of.

== Cast ==
- Michael O'Keefe as Jake Bateman
- Paul Rodriguez as Barney Bonar
- Denholm Elliott as Colonel Phelps
- Carole Shelley as Henrietta Phelps
- Dan O'Herlihy as Judge Sternhill
- Lucinda Jenney as Olivia
- Eddie Deezen as Eddie Lipschitz
- Marsha Warfield as Officer White
- Elizabeth Arlen as Shelley
- Andy Bumatai as Roy "Raja" Rajmataj
- Karen Smythe as Claudia Antonucci
- Joe Spinell as Guido Antonucci
- Stephen Davies as Strobe
- Taylor Negron as "Whitey"
- Greg Germann as Tipper
- Keith David as Washington Square Peddler
- Stephen Roberts as Wedding Guest

== Production ==
Casting directors Lisa Bramon and Billy Hopkins were given the brief of finding "the Abbott and Costello of the 1980s" for the film. The roles went to Paul Rodriguez and Michael O'Keefe.

== Reception ==
The Los Angeles Times called the film "senseless and self-indulgent" adding "one hesitates to blame the writers -- since so many of the scenes have an improvised air -- but something has gone limp with the comic construction of this movie. It feels like a whoopee cushion that's leaking. There's not enough energy left to offend you."
