= Afterworld (web series) =

- Genre: Drama; Science fiction; Post-apocalyptic; Mystery
- Created by: Brent V. Friedman & Michael DeCourcey
- Developed by: Brent V. Friedman & Michael DeCourcey
- Directed by: Stan Rogow
- Starring: see below
- Narrated by: Roark Critchlow
- Theme music composer: Sam Winans
- Country of origin: United States
- Original language: English
- No. of seasons: 1
- No. of episodes: 13

Production
- Executive producers: Stan Rogow; Brent V. Friedman
- Producers: John Alexander Reed, Adam Sigel and Marlin Davis
- Running time: 3 minutes

Original release
- Release: February 28, 2007 – 2008

Afterworld is an American animated science fiction web series created by writer Brent V. Friedman and artist/filmmaker Michael DeCourcey. Its naturalistic future setting, modeled after traditional Western movie motifs, presents an atypical science fiction backdrop for the narrative. Friedman served as executive producer, along with Stan Rogow.

Afterworld premiered in the United States on YouTube and Bud.tv on February 28, 2007 with the production website being launched in May, 2007. The series quickly built a loyal fanbase but did not really take off until August, 2007 when it was 're-released' on MySpace. In conjunction with that release the series was also released in Australia on the Sci Fi Channel, as a mobile podcast, and as a web series on US based Crackle.

The series was also made available by Sony Pictures Television International as 13 half-hour episodes for traditional broadcasters.

== Plot ==
After travelling to New York City on a business trip, Russell Shoemaker wakes to find all electronic technology dead and more than 99% of the human race missing. Driven by a need to discover the truth and determined to return to his family, he embarks on a journey to his home in Seattle, while recording and telling all of the events in his journal. Afterworld is the story of Russell's 3,000-mile (4,800 km) trek across a post-apocalyptic America as he encounters the strange new societies rebuilding themselves. Along the way, he also attempts to solve the mystery of what caused this global event, which survivors refer to as The Fall.

In addition to new forms of government, Russell discovers that technology has failed due to a persistent electromagnetic pulse, a product of a collection of satellites that was activated almost simultaneously to the Fall. An additional side effect of the EMP is the rapid mutation of many forms of life, including Shoemaker himself. He describes that his night vision has improved dramatically, along with his endurance. Other examples are seen in cattle Russell happens across, which are dying of a previously unheard form of necrotizing fasciitis.

Russell's journey eventually brings him to a nearly deserted San Francisco, and the headquarters of an organization known as the Parthia Group, who had developed a form of nano-technology, which identified humans with a particular genetic makeup.

== Cast ==
- Russell "The Walker" Shoemaker – An ad executive from Seattle who wakes to find technology dead and humanity gone. He journeys home, uncovering the truth behind The Fall and ultimately seeking to rescue his daughter, Kizzy, from the Parthia Group.
- Janelle "Jan" Shoemaker – Russell's wife, a social work supervisor who disappears during The Fall
- Kizzy "Kiz" Shoemaker – Russell and Janelle's daughter, a gifted fifth grader. She survives The Fall and ends up in Parthia's custody after being saved from a Seattle labor camp.
- Officer Delondre Baines – A mounted NYPD officer who survives The Fall She joins the cult of New Eden, is sent to kill "The Walker", but renounces her faith after meeting Russell and dedicates herself to spreading the truth.
- Eli – A once-wealthy jeweller turned homeless man who mentors Russell. His guidance leads Russell to abandon violence; he later appears as a ghostly figure offering wisdom.
- Jack Hastings – Former U.S. Speaker of the House and Parthia Group member. Suspected of causing The Fall, he is later revealed to have presided over an accident. Parthia monitors Russell's journey and holds Kizzy.
- John "J.D." Daggert – An insurance salesman who founds the New Eden cult after losing his son in The Fall Convinced he is God's prophet, he becomes Russell's fanatical enemy.
- Arnold Shafer, Ph.D. – Anthropologist and leader of the "New World Historians", a Parthia front spreading false narratives. After his schemes collapse, he is executed by his own mercenary, Subu.
- Charles and Subu – Ex-soldiers turned mercenaries for the Historians. Charles dies pursuing Russell; Subu defects after witnessing Arnold's corruption and kills him before walking away.

== Broadcast history ==
- Bud.tv: February 28, 2007–present
- Youtube.com: February 28, 2007–present
- Myspace.com: August 2007–present
- Sci-Fi Channel: August 2007–present
- Vuze.com: March 2008–present
- Channel 4: 2008
- AXN East Asia, Bulgaria, Czech & Hungary: May 2008–present (Daily) 6.00pm/7:00pm SIN/PHIL/HK (Mon-Fri at 7:00pm)
- AXN Beyond (Philippines, Singapore, Hong Kong): May 2008–present (Daily) 9.00pm SIN/PHIL/HK
- ProSieben (German TV): July 1, 2008 - August 31, 2008 (Daily)
- GO TV South Africa May 2009–Present Mon-Fri 10.30pm
- STS Russia summer 2011 - week-end 6.00-8.00am

The complete series was also released as 130 episodes of about 2–3 minutes each.

== Afterworld: Global Contact ==
Sony published a mobile game based before the events of Season 2, but after the catastrophic planetary event known as The Fall caused 99% of the world's population to disappear, along with almost all technology. This is a mobile adventure game where different survivors journey the world in search of their families, going from continent to continent, encountering daring adventures in cities such as Paris, Seoul, Sydney and Rio de Janeiro. The players confront each challenge and battle their enemies as they struggle to create communication towers to allow the world to regain global contact. It was launched in September 2008.

The narrative of the game offers a preview of Season 2 which never aired.

== Emergency Subnet ==
First revealed through an alternate reality game (ARG), a UK-exclusive online viral series called "Emergency Subnet" for Channel 4 starred the character Maia Sturn (played by Nathalie Pownall) as a spin-off of "Afterworld." It was produced to promote the launch of the American animated series in the UK. Like Russell, Maia dealt with the effects of The Fall and faced solitude in London, England. She documented her day-to-day life through video blogs and journal entries using the Emergency Subnet.

== See also ==
- List of apocalyptic and post-apocalyptic fiction
- Midnight Nation
