= Harry and Walter Go to New York =

1976 American comedy film

- US DVD Cover
- Directed by: Mark Rydell
- Written by: Don Devlin
- Story by: John Byrum; Robert Kaufman
- Produced by: Don Devlin; Harry Gittes
- Starring: James Caan; Elliott Gould; Michael Caine; Diane Keaton; Charles Durning; Lesley Ann Warren
- Cinematography: László Kovács
- Edited by: David Bretherton; Don Guidice
- Music by: David Shire
- Distributed by: Columbia Pictures
- Release date: June 17, 1976
- Running time: 112 minutes
- Country: United States
- Language: English
- Budget: under $7 million

Harry and Walter Go to New York is a 1976 American period comedy film written by John Byrum and Robert Kaufman, directed by Mark Rydell, and starring James Caan, Elliott Gould, Michael Caine, Diane Keaton, Charles Durning and Lesley Ann Warren. In the film, two dimwitted con-men try to pull off the biggest heist ever seen in late nineteenth-century New York City. They are opposed by the greatest bank robber of the day, and aided by a crusading newspaper editor.

== Plot ==
Harry Dighby and Walter Hill are struggling vaudevillians who are sent to jail when Dighby is caught robbing audience members. They become roommates to a cultured, wealthy, and charming bank robber named Adam Worth. Worth plans to rob the Lowell Bank and Trust, both to avenge himself on the bank manager who had arranged his capture and because his ego cannot resist the temptation of robbing a bank reputed to be perfectly secure. Though in jail, he procures detailed diagrams of the bank's security systems. Given his wealth, he is able to bribe the warden and staff to cater to his needs: a large cell, his own furnishings, servants, and other perks.

A reforming newspaperwoman named Lissa Chestnut visits their cell. During her visit Dighby and Hill manage to photograph the bank plans with her camera, then accidentally burn the originals, which enrages Worth, and he orders the warden to put them on the work team that handles nitroglycerin. They break out of prison the next day using a vial of the stuff to blow a hole right through the outer prison wall, at the same time as Worth is paroled. They meet in New York City; and, by force, Worth manages to extract a copy of the photographed plans from them. Dighby, Hill, and Chestnut then band with Chestnut's team of do-gooders to race against Worth and his professional bank robbing squad to see who can rob the Lowell Bank and Trust first.

When they overhear Worth making his plans to blow open the safe, they get all the same equipment, even a pump, despite not knowing why they need it. The bank is next to a theatre that is putting on a popular musical comedy, and the team breaks into the bank before Worth and his team arrive. They try to blow open the safe, but the dynamite has no effect. One of the team realizes that they have to get the explosives behind the door to work, and that's when they figure out how to use the pump. Liquifying the dynamite, they cover the edge of the door in putty, pour the liquid in through a spout at the top, and use the pump to create suction down at the base. However, all this takes time, and the show starts its big finale "The Kingdom of Love". Thinking quickly, Harry gets into costume and rushes on stage, and then calls for his slave – Walter. The cast is totally confused and desperately tries to finish the number, but Harry and Walter keep throwing in ad libs and their old routines, which gives their team time to blow the door and make off with the cash. Finally, allowing the show to end, Harry and Walter get a standing ovation, just as Worth and his team make their way into the bank, where they are met by the police. Accused of robbing the bank, Worth points out that they are in the process of entering and not leaving, and are thus released.

Some days later, Harry and Walter and their team enter the fancy restaurant that Worth frequents, and ask for the best table in the house. They are told to leave, but Worth starts to tap on his glass – a gesture of respect and acceptance. Soon everyone is doing it, and they are seated. Worth comes over to speak to Lissa and she tells how the bank's money is buying milk for the poor children of the city. Offering her his arm, they go off to chat, a budding romance is hinted at, and Harry and Walter realize that neither of them is going to "get the girl". While a bit despondent, they get the idea to perform their act right there in the restaurant – pointing out that it is just about the best house they could ever hope to appear in. Handing their music to the pianist, they step off to the side, he plays, they make their entrance, and start to perform for the adoring crowd.

== Cast ==
- James Caan as Harry Dighby
- Elliott Gould as Walter Hill
- Michael Caine as Adam Worth
- Diane Keaton as Lissa Chestnut
- Charles Durning as Rufus T. Crisp
- Lesley Ann Warren as Gloria Fontaine
- Val Avery as Chatsworth
- Jack Gilford as Mischa
- Dennis Dugan as Lewis
- Carol Kane as Florence
- Kathryn Grody as Barbara
- David Proval as Ben
- Michael Conrad as Billy Gallagher
- Burt Young as Warden Durgom
- Bert Remsen as Guard O’Meara
- Ted Cassidy as Leary

== Production ==
The film was the idea of producers Don Devlin and Harry Gittes. They thought the setting of 1890s New York might make an interesting arena for a film. They researched the period and decided to focus on the activities of safe crackers. John Byrum was hired to write a script. They decided to make Harry and Walter vaudevillians after watching a TV special on Scott Joplin.

Tony Bill was hired to help produce. John Byrum sold the script for $500,000. It was originally called Harry and Walter.

David Shire came on board to write the music and Joe Layton to direct. Robert Kaufman did another draft of the script. The film was sold to Columbia in June 1974.

Mark Rydell signed to direct the film in December 1974. Columbia president David Begelman was hoping the film would be another The Sting and wanted Jack Nicholson to play a lead. Michael Caine, Elliott Gould and James Caan signed to play the leads. Diane Keaton then signed to play the female lead.

"When you're dealing with a big budget film two major actors are almost a requirement", said producer Devlin.

Caan later said he did not want to make the film or The Killer Elite but he did because he was told "they were commercial."

The budget of the film was set to be "under $7 million". Filming took place in October 1975.

A novelization was written by Sam Stewart, and published by Dell Publishing.

== Reception ==
The film received mixed reviews from critics. It was a big flop at the box office, along with a number of "buddy comedies" set in the past, like Nickelodeon and Lucky Lady.

Roger Ebert of the Chicago Sun-Times gave the film two-and-a-half stars out of four and wrote that "the movie never quite fulfills its promise. It has inspired moments, it's well photographed, Miss Keaton has some wonderfully fiery dialog as the radical editor, but somehow the direction and tone are just a little too muted. Maybe events should have been played more broadly." Vincent Canby of The New York Times called the film "so implacably cute that you might suspect that it was based on a coloring book based on 'The Sting.' It's big and blank and so faux naif that you want to hit it over the head in the way that used to bring people to their senses in true farce, of which this is no example."

Gene Siskel of the Chicago Tribune awarded two stars out of four and wrote that the film "evokes neither its period nor the adventure of safecracking. All that we get is 110 minutes of Gould and Caan mugging in front of the camera, stepping in front of each other, begging for applause." Arthur D. Murphy of Variety stated, "In a season of general mediocrity, this is the prize turkey." He added, "Every single creative person has previously accumulated some meritable work. The odds must be a million to one that, in a given project ensemble, they would all emerge at their worst. But it happened here." Kevin Thomas of the Los Angeles Times called the screenplay "silly and puerile" and added, "Caine, delightfully poised and witty, steals the show—only it really isn't worth having." Gary Arnold of The Washington Post praised the film as "a pleasant surprise" and "[a] personable and amusing variation on the caper comedy outline of 'The Sting.'" Filmink wrote "Everyone looks as though they are having fun, but it is not infectious to the audience in a film with far too many lead characters."

== Legacy ==
James Caan later dubbed the film "Harry and Walter Go to the Toilet" and sacked his management after making the movie. "The director sacrificed jokes to tell a story no one cared about", he said, marking it "3 out of 10".

Producer Tony Bill called it "the one movie of which I'm ashamed because it was not my taste. It was a wonderful script completely rewritten by the director." Writer Robert Kaufman said he wrote the film after "I got married again. I finished five years of analysis. I stopped hating. Even though it's against my nature I wrote a funny big piece of lemon meringue pie. But nobody wants to go see a funny, optimistic picture."

Lesley Ann Warren says she was unable to get a job for years after the film.
