= Bud.tv =

bud.tv was a marketing venture of the Anheuser-Busch brewing company (the manufacturers of the Budweiser beer brand) in the form of an online entertainment network. The project, which was launched in February 2007 just after the American Super Bowl, was rumored to cost more than $30 million in its first year. The head of the project, as well as its originator, was Jim Schumacker, an executive at A-B.

The first attempt by a consumer product company to launch a full-scale TV network with original long-form programming online, the project was met with great anticipation and interest among media and marketing professionals. It failed to attract the expected number of visitors in its first month of operation, however.

In May 2007, A-B contemplated changing strategies to make their content more portable and accessible to users. Rather than forcing users to come to the site, A-B worked on distribution initiatives with partners to email alerts to fans when and where content is airing.

Bud.tv was shut down in February 2009. Possible causes for the site's initial low viewership include a lack of compelling content, the inability to easily share content, and a difficult-to-use age verification system. The site's age verification firewall required users to enter personal information from government-issued identification, such as driver's license, before registering in order to discourage under-aged visitors. The cost, effort and focus required to maintain an entertainment site of this scale were also factors.

== Programming ==
The original content on bud.tv ranged from sports to sci-fi to drama, but focused primarily on comedy. Writers tapped for bud.tv came from Saturday Night Live and The Howard Stern Show, and deals were made with such Hollywood players as Vince Vaughn, Kevin Spacey, Ben Affleck and Matt Damon, in addition to sportscaster Joe Buck and race car driver Dale Earnhardt Jr. bud.tv's original programming has included a comedy named "Replaced by a Chimp," a story about an everyday hero starring Tim Meadows entitled, "Ice Vision and Chef," and a show called "Future Man" starring Chris Parnell and Kevin Farley.

Concerns initially arose from critics arguing that the site would be advertising beer and drinking to underage viewers, but according to Robert C. Lachky, executive vice president for global industry development and chief creative officer at Anheuser-Busch, the original programming available on bud.tv has "nothing to do with (Anheuser-Busch's) brands." The content makes little mention of Budweiser products at all. The breakout hit for the site came in the form of a discarded Super Bowl commercial entitled "Swear Jar" which, at the time, increased traffic by 50%.

The strategy behind this kind of original content created by companies or advertisers is to reach the exact audience segment intended for a given product, utilizing a "soft sell" technique.

== See also ==
- Afterworld (Sci-Fi Show)
- Anheuser-Busch
- Budweiser (Anheuser-Busch)
