= Murder in High Places =

1991 American television film

Murder in High Places is a 1991 American TV film written and directed by John Byrum.

It was originally a pilot for an NBC series to be called Out of Season.

The original music from the TV film was scored and composed by Stewart Copeland.

== Premise ==
A gonzo journalist like Hunter S. Thompson (Ted Levine) is elected mayor of a fictional Colorado town. He teams up with an ex-cop-pro football player (Adam Baldwin) to solve a murder case.

== Cast ==
- Ted Levine as Carson Russell
- Adam Baldwin as Stoney Ptak
- Joyce Hyser as Terry Ptak
- Xander Berkeley as Wayne
- Miguel Ferrer as Wilhoite
- Vince Grant as Dent
- Lisa Kudrow as Miss Stitch
- Judith Hoag as Meg Faithorn
- James Keach as Levering
- Traci Lords as Diane
- Michael McKean as Pettibone
- Jamey Sheridan as Randall Horn

== Reception ==
In a review for Newsday, Kevin Thomas wrote, "What an amazing show that was. An irreverent, funny, poignant and violent story about different counterculture people as well as the rich and famous. Different dialogue, different things happening in a show written for adults, by adults.... It really pushed the envelope for NBC. Unfortunately, once [Brandon] Tartikoff threw himself out the door at NBC for Paramount the envelope went with him. "Out of Season" (a.k.a. "Murder in High Places") wound up in the dead-letter file at the new, dull NBC."
