= Mr. Mom =

1983 American film directed by Stan Dragoti

- Theatrical release poster
- Directed by: Stan Dragoti
- Written by: John Hughes
- Produced by: Lynn Loring; Lauren Shuler
- Starring: Michael Keaton; Teri Garr; Martin Mull; Ann Jillian; Christopher Lloyd
- Cinematography: Victor J. Kemper
- Edited by: Patrick Kennedy
- Music by: Lee Holdridge
- Production company: Sherwood Productions
- Distributed by: 20th Century-Fox
- Release date: July 22, 1983 (United States)
- Running time: 91 minutes
- Country: United States
- Language: English
- Budget: $5 million
- Box office: $64.8 million

Mr. Mom is a 1983 American comedy film directed by Stan Dragoti, written by John Hughes, and produced by Lynn Loring and Lauren Shuler. It stars Michael Keaton (in his first lead role), Teri Garr, Martin Mull, Ann Jillian, and Christopher Lloyd. It tells the story of Jack Butler, a furloughed Detroit automotive engineer who becomes a stay-at-home dad and takes care of three young children, as his wife Caroline returns to a career in the advertising industry as an executive at a large agency. Released by 20th Century-Fox on July 22, 1983, the film received generally positive reviews from critics and was a box office success, grossing $64 million against its $5 million budget.

== Plot ==
Jack Butler lives with his wife, Caroline, and their children Alex, Kenny, and Megan, in a Detroit suburb. During the early-1980s recession, Jack and his friends Larry and Stan lose their engineering jobs at the Ford Motor Company. Caroline, having been a housewife for years, uses her college education and experience working in advertising to re-enter the workforce, leaving Jack to deal with the new and bewildering responsibilities of a stay-at-home dad.

Jack discovers childcare and house maintenance involve a complex juggling act, and his initial struggles in daily errands gain the attention and company of other neighborhood housewives. Eventually, he hits his stride and although somewhat distracted by the flirtatious Joan (a neighbor and friend of Caroline's), he begins to feel confined by suburban domestic life. Simultaneously, he feels threatened by Caroline's responsibilities and work-life as a fast-climbing ad executive.

Meanwhile, Caroline contends with challenges in the workforce: her maternal and housekeeping instincts jeopardize her position as a sophisticated executive, and her boss Ron Richardson is intent on seducing her. During a pitch to a hard-to-please client, Caroline's insight as a budget-conscious housewife proves invaluable. The client's president wants her to fly to Los Angeles to help shoot a commercial.

In the meantime, Jack's former employer invites him to interview for his old job, but his former supervisor Jinx Latham betrays his reputation. Jack lectures them on dirty practices and storms out.

Ron tries to convince Caroline to leave Jack and marry him while Joan continues to try to seduce Jack. After a commercial shoot in Los Angeles, Caroline relaxes in her hotel bathtub. Ron sneaks into her room with champagne. Back home, Jack tries calling her so the kids can talk to her, but Ron answers. He hangs up, leading Jack to think his wife is having an affair. Caroline fends off Ron and quits her job.

The next day dawns with repair people in the home to fix a broken television and spray for bugs. Caroline arrives home unexpectedly, and she and Jack talk over their misunderstandings, reuniting as a stronger couple. Ron stops by begging Caroline to come back to work as the client thinks only she can properly handle their account. However, Caroline says she intends to get a better job and has missed her family, though she finally agrees to stay with the agency after Ron agrees to offer her the chance to work from home two days a week and reduce her work load in order for her to have the chance to spend more time with her family. Jinx also comes begging for Jack to return to work. Jack punches Jinx in the face for being rude to Alex and refuses to return to work unless Larry and Stan do also. Jinx accepts the conditions. On the newly repaired TV, the national commercial Caroline helped produce is broadcast.

== Cast ==
- Michael Keaton as Jack Butler, a Detroit automotive engineer who becomes a stay-at-home dad after losing his job.
- Teri Garr as Caroline Butler, the wife of Jack who gets a job at an advertising company.
- Frederick Koehler as Alex Butler, the older son of Jack and Caroline.
- Taliesin Jaffe as Kenny Butler, the younger son of Jack and Caroline.
- Courtney and Brittany White as Megan Butler, the baby daughter of Jack and Caroline.
- Martin Mull as Ron Richardson, the head of an advertising company that Caroline works at.
- Ann Jillian as Joan, a friend of Caroline who lives in her neighborhood.
- Jeffrey Tambor as "Jinx" Latham, the supervisor of Jack at the Ford Motor Company.
- Christopher Lloyd as Larry, Jack's co-worker at the Ford Motor Company who loses his job.
- Graham Jarvis as Humphries
- Carolyn Seymour as Eve
- Miriam Flynn as Annette
- Tom Leopold as Stan, Jack's co-worker at the Ford Motor Company who loses his job.
- Michael Ensign as Executive #1
- Derek McGrath as Executive #2
- Ken Olfson as Executive #3
- Frank Birney as Executive #4
- Hilary Beane as Executive #5
- Edie McClurg as Check-Out Lady
- Patti Deutsch as Deli Girl

== Production ==
While working at Motown Productions, story editor and struggling producer Lauren Shuler read an article in National Lampoon written by John Hughes and kept in touch with him. One day, Hughes told Shuler about a disastrous experience he had looking after his two children John and James in the absence of his wife Nancy, which Shuler found hilarious. After Hughes asked if that could make a good movie, she replied that "it sure sounds funny to me". Hughes wrote the film and flew to Los Angeles to rewrite the script with Shuler. As Hughes had a TV deal with Aaron Spelling, he brought him in as an executive producer. Studio executives at Universal Studios, unhappy that Hughes worked in Chicago and not Los Angeles, fired him, bringing in a group of TV writers to rewrite his script.

Ron Howard was offered the opportunity to direct the film but turned it down to do Splash. At this point, the studio decided to turn the project into a feature film instead of a television movie. Shuler, who remained as a producer, said that while she liked the final product, she thought Hughes' original script was better. Shuler was told by a friend, agent Laurie Perlman, about "this guy who is really funny" whom she represented, Michael Keaton. After meeting Keaton and seeing his screen debut, 1982's Night Shift, Shuler sent the actor the Mr. Mom script.

== Release ==
=== Box office ===
The film opened to limited release on July 22, 1983, with $947,197, earning the number 13 spot that weekend. Upon its wide release on August 19, 1983, a month later, it opened at number 3 with $4,279,384, behind Easy Money's opening weekend and Risky Business's third. Mr. Mom ended up earning $64 million in the US. Its success led Universal to sign a three-picture deal with Hughes for $30 million. Those three films he would later release for the studio were Sixteen Candles, The Breakfast Club, and Weird Science.

=== Home media ===
Mr. Mom was released on VHS by Vestron Video on February 1, 1984. The film was released on DVD by MGM Home Entertainment on April 25, 2000.

== Reception ==
On Rotten Tomatoes, the film has an approval rating of 77% based on 26 reviews, with an average rating of 6.1/10. The site's critical consensus reads: "Mr. Mom makes up for its stereotype-driven premise with a sweet script and charming work from a well-matched cast led by Michael Keaton and Teri Garr." On Metacritic, it received a weighted average score of 50 out of 100, based on seven critics, indicating "mixed or average reviews".

=== Critical response ===
Leonard Maltin gave it 2.5 stars out of 4, calling the film a "pleasant enough rehash of [an] age-old sitcom premise" and adding that "likable stars make it palatable, but you've seen it all before".

Roger Ebert of the Chicago Sun-Times similarly gave the film 2 stars out of 4, describing Mr. Mom as "a lost opportunity" for resorting to cliches rather than finding humor in the characters as portrayed by the "promising" and talented cast.

Janet Maslin of The New York Times wrote: "MR. MOM is a very creaky comedy about a househusband, whose plight is presented as a terrible humiliation. Though Jack (Michael Keaton) proclaims himself a regular Phil Donahue when it comes to being enlightened about women in the workplace, the first half of the movie revolves around his annoyance about his wife's having a job."

== Adaptations ==
In 1984, Frank Dungan & Jeff Stein wrote a teleplay for a made-for-TV movie and directed by Terry Hughes based on the film written by Hughes.

A television adaptation of the film by MGM and Walmart's streaming service Vudu serves as a continuation of the film, following an adult Megan Butler (Andrea Anders) heading back into the workforce while her husband Greg Anderson (Hayes MacArthur) takes over the parental duties of their two children Hannah (Catherine and Elizabeth Last) and Zach (Cary Christopher). It premiered on September 12, 2019.

== See also ==
- List of American films of 1983
