= American Dragons =

- Directed by: Ralph Hemecker
- Written by: Keith W. Strandberg; Erik Saltzgaber
- Produced by: Jeffrey D. Ivers; Ju-Ho Jung; Jennifer Muhn; Brad Krevoy; R.J. Murillo; Steve Stabler
- Starring: Michael Biehn; Park Joong-hoon; Cary-Hiroyuki Tagawa; Don Stark
- Cinematography: Ernest Holzman
- Edited by: Alan L. Shefland
- Music by: Joel Goldsmith; Alex Wilkinson
- Production companies: Orion Pictures; Motion Picture Corporation of America
- Distributed by: Metro-Goldwyn-Mayer
- Release date: September 15, 1998
- Running time: 120 minutes
- Country: United States
- Language: English

American Dragons (also known as Double Edge) is a 1998 action crime thriller film directed by Ralph Hemecker and starring Michael Biehn, Park Joong-hoon, Cary-Hiroyuki Tagawa, Don Stark and Byron Mann. It was written by Erik Saltzgaber and Keith W. Strandberg and produced by Brad Krevoy.

== Plot ==
Detective Tony Luca is sent on a homicide investigation of a Yakuza leader after a bungled undercover sting to capture notorious gangster Rocco. After finding a folded origami lotus with the black lotus insignia Tony is assigned a partner, Detective Kim from Seoul, South Korea. Kim is described by Luca's captain as an expert on the league of ninja assassins known as the Black Lotus Society. Both Yakuza and Mafia gangsters are being assassinated all over town by the mysterious assassin known to Kim as "Shadow".

After squeezing information out of Yakuza businessman Nakai and Mafia informant Mike, the two detectives discover that the Black Lotus plans to ignite a mob war between the Yakuza and the Mafia and adopt their businesses. The two men responsible for the plan are Shadow and Rocco, two men who haunt the pasts of the two detectives. With the two detectives now cooperating with one another, they collect the leaders of both the Mafia and the Yakuza and inform them of the plan of the Black Lotus Society and take them both to the police holding station to prevent their deaths and prevent further mob killings.

With both mob leaders in safe keeping the two detectives hunt down the location of Shadow and Rocco. Fights ensue with Kim fighting Shadow, and Luca having a shootout with Rocco. It all comes down to an epic standoff, leaving Kim and Luca the only two left alive. Luca and Kim say their goodbyes at the airport wishing each other the best, leaving as friends. As Kim walks up the walkway to the plane a man is shown having his ticket taken by the gate. Taking his ticket stub back, this man reveals a Black Lotus tattoo on the inside of his fingers and leaves to take his flight, the same one Detective Kim is taking back to South Korea.

== Cast ==
- Michael Biehn as Detective Tony Luca
- Park Joong-hoon as Detective Kim
- Cary-Hiroyuki Tagawa as Matsuyama
- Don Stark as Rocco
- Byron Mann as "Shadow"
- Benjamin Ratner as Angelo
- Lorena Gale as Captain Talman
- Hiro Kanagawa as Nakai
- Brad Loree as Mike
- Dean Choe as Sato
- Chris Franco as Pozzo
- James Crescenzo as Fiorino
- Roger Cross as Detective Dion Edwards (as Roger R. Cross)
- Kevan Ohtsji as Young Yakuza
- Warren Takeuchi as Aki
- Fulvio Cecere as Bobby Spano

== Critical reception ==
Writing for The Digital Fix, Anthony Nield remarked the film is "dependent on cliches" and the characters lacked depth. Of the action scenes, Nield said, "without the investment in [Hemecker's] leads, or anyone else for that matter, these set pieces appear to simply lurch from one fistfight to the next".
