= Catherine Hicks =

American actress (born 1951)

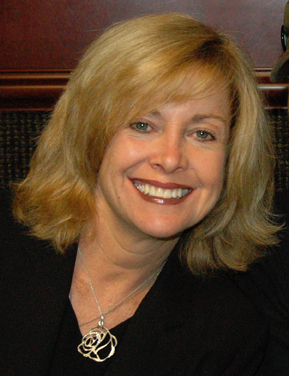
- Hicks in 2005
- Born: Catherine Mary Hicks; August 6, 1951 (age 75); New York City, U.S.
- Education: Saint Mary's College (BA); Cornell University (MFA); Lee Strasberg Theatre and Film Institute
- Occupation: Actress
- Years active: 1976–2020
- Known for: 7th Heaven; Ryan's Hope; Marilyn: The Untold Story; Star Trek IV: The Voyage Home
- Spouse: Kevin Yagher (m. 1990)
- Children: 1

Catherine Mary Hicks (born August 6, 1951) is an American retired actress. She played the character Annie Camden on the long-running television series 7th Heaven (1996–2007). Other roles included Dr. Faith Coleridge on the soap opera Ryan's Hope (1976–1978), her Emmy Award-nominated performance as Marilyn Monroe in Marilyn: The Untold Story (1980), Dr. Gillian Taylor in Star Trek IV: The Voyage Home (1986), Carol Heath in Peggy Sue Got Married (1986), and Karen Barclay in Child's Play (1988).

== Early life ==
Hicks was born in New York City to homemaker Jackie and electronics salesman Walter Hicks. She is of Irish and English ancestry. Her family moved to Scottsdale, Arizona, during her childhood. Hicks attended Saint Mary's College in Notre Dame, Indiana where she studied English literature, graduating in 1973. She then won a prestigious acting fellowship sponsored by the University Resident Theatre Association to Cornell University. While at Cornell, she was a member of the Ithaca Repertory Theater Company.

== Career ==
After graduating from Cornell with a Master of Fine Arts degree, Hicks headed to New York in August 1976. Two weeks after arriving, she landed her first major TV role newly-recovered pediatrician Dr. Faith Coleridge on the ABC soap opera Ryan's Hope " projecting immense sensitivity and warmth" in the role. A year and half later, she left Ryan's Hope when she was cast to star alongside Jack Lemmon (as Scottie) in Bernard Slade's 1978 Broadway play Tribute, in which she played the young model Sally Haines, whom Scottie sets up with his estranged son (Robert Picardo). That same year, she starred as Valerie in a CBS TV movie/series pilot, Sparrow.

After Tribute ended its run, she moved to California and co-starred on the 1979–80 CBS sitcom, The Bad News Bears as junior high school principal and psychologist Dr. Emily Rappant. She had roles in a few TV movies, playing an escort, Annie, in ABC's Love For Rent (1979), and as Beth, a camp counselor in CBS's 1980 film To Race the Wind, based on the Harold Krents' autobiography.

In 1980, Hicks beat out hundreds of actresses for the lead role of Marilyn Monroe in ABC's $3.5 million production, Marilyn: The Untold Story, based on the Norman Mailer best seller. She earned an Emmy Award nomination for Outstanding Lead Actress in a Miniseries or Movie for her portrayal of the legendary star.

In 1981, Hicks starred in CBS's remake of Jacqueline Susann's Valley of the Dolls, as Anne Wells, an entertainment lawyer, and James Coburn's protege. She turned down a co-starring role in Body Heat due to the overtly sexual nature of the film. She made her feature-film debut in the thriller Death Valley (1982) as Peter Billingsley's mother, Sally. That same year, she starred as Sable in Better Late Than Never.

Hicks took the lead role as Amanda Tucker in the 12-episode detective series Tucker's Witch opposite Tim Matheson as Rick Tucker. The program aired on CBS from October 6, 1982, sporadically into August, 1983. In 1983, she played Lisa Sage and co-starred with John Schneider and Catherine's former Ryan's Hope co-star, Ana Alicia, in CBS's romantic comedy movie Happy Endings.

Hicks appeared with Anne Bancroft and Ron Silver in Sidney Lumet's film Garbo Talks (1984). Hicks also played Bill Murray's socialite fiancée, Isabel, in the remake The Razor's Edge (1984). For her work in Star Trek IV: The Voyage Home (1986), Hicks received a Saturn Award nomination for Best Supporting Actress. That same year, she played Carol Heath in Francis Ford Coppola's Peggy Sue Got Married.

In Like Father Like Son (1987), Hicks played Dr. Amy Larkin. In March 1987, Hicks hosted the 59th Academy of Motion Picture Arts and Sciences' Scientific and Technical Awards ceremony.

In 1988, she played businesswoman Ella Frazier in the Yugoslavian comedy Tajna manastirske rakije (also released under the titles Cognac and Secret Ingredient). She co-starred with Christopher Plummer, as his estranged daughter, Tina Boyer, in Showtime's Souvenir (1989). She played Karen Barclay in the horror film Child's Play (1988). Her performance won her a 1988 Best Actress Saturn Award.

In 1989, she starred opposite Tony Danza in She's Out of Control as his girlfriend, Janet Pearson. In 1991, she co-starred in the Fox TV comedy-fantasy movie Hi Honey - I'm Dead as Carol Stadler. She played Allison Ploutzer in the Jeff Franklin ABC comedy pilot Up to No Good (1992). She starred with John Bedford Lloyd in the ABC comedy pilot The Circle Game (1993) as the mother, schoolteacher Nancy. She played Jeannie Barker in the Aaron Spelling primetime soap opera Winnetka Road, which had a six-episode tryout on NBC in 1994. That same year, she played the wife in the pilot for The Martin Short Show. Going into production, after the concept of the character was changed, she was replaced by Jan Hooks. She played Julia Riordan, opposite John Lithgow and Lea Salonga, in the ABC Hallmark Hall of Fame movie Redwood Curtain (1995). In 1996, she was cast as Annie Camden on The WB's family drama 7th Heaven, and she portrayed the role until the series ended, after 11 seasons, in 2007. In 1997, Hicks played flight attendant Maggie in Turbulence. The same year, Hicks played next door neighbor, Ms. Lewis, in Michael Davis' coming-of-age film, Eight Days a Week.

In 2001, she was one of the actors featured in renowned Hollywood photographer Nancy Ellison's book, Starlet: First Stage at the Hollywood Dream Factory. The book was a collection of archival material of shooting starlets and contained pictures of Hicks that Ellison had taken in the 1980s.

In 2008, she starred in Lifetime Movie Network's Poison Ivy: The Secret Society as Dean Elisabeth Graves. In another Lifetime film Stranger with My Face (2009), she played the widowed mother Shelley Stratton. She played Mom in the independent short film You're a Wolf (2009), co-starring Michael Gross and Jesse Bradford. In 2009, she again played a therapist, Dr. Rosen, in the WB's online series, Pushed.

Hicks was featured in My Name Is Jerry, an independent film shot mostly in Muncie, Indiana. Hicks won the award for Best Actress in a Supporting Role from the 2009 International Filmmakers Festival for her portrayal as Dana.

In 2010, Hicks received positive reviews for her role as Hildegarde, in playwright Christopher Durang's Why Torture Is Wrong and the People Who Love Them at the Stella Adler Theater in Hollywood. She was Texas family court Judge Harriet Krammer in the Hallmark Channel movie A Valentine's Date (2011), (which was also released under the video title Your Love Never Fails). She played Jean in the Lifetime movie Borderline Murder (2011). Hicks played bartender, Rose, who attracted the attention of Elliott Gould in the film Dorfman in Love (2011). Hicks co-starred as Anna Walker in the 2011 Walmart and Procter & Gamble Family Movie Night drama on NBC called Game Time: Tackling the Past. She joined actors Noah Wyle, Virginia Madsen, Mike Farrell, and others in a September 2011 reading of Windows on the World, by Colette Keen, at Hollywood's Stella Adler Theatre, commemorating the 10th anniversary of the 9/11 attacks.

In November 2011, she starred as Irene Livingston in the Jewish Repertory Theatre of Nevada's Las Vegas production of the Moss Hart play Light Up the Sky. Hicks played Ellen in the 2011 Hallmark Channel movie A Christmas Wedding Tail.

In May 2012, Hicks played Annette Bramble in the Lifetime Network movie Shadow of Fear. Also in May 2012, and into June, she performed in the play Princess, in the Blank Theatre Company's 20th Annual Young Playwrights Festival at the Stella Adler Theatre.

In December 2012, she played Marla Sokoloff's character's mother in the Ion Television original movie, A Christmas Wedding Date. She played Linda, a mother whose young adult son has terminal cancer, in the 2013 film, Reach. Hicks was one of the eight actresses in the Showtime documentary, That Gal... Who Was in That Thing (2015), as she shared her experiences and challenges of being a female actor.

In January 2023, Hicks revealed she had retired from acting.

== Personal life ==
Hicks was engaged to journalist Jeff Silverman in the mid-1980s, but the engagement ended.

She met her future husband, special effects make-up artist Kevin Yagher, on the set of the film Child's Play. Hicks and Yagher were married on May 19, 1990. They have a daughter, Caitlin.

Hicks is a practicing Roman Catholic.

Since the 1987–1988 academic school year, the University of Notre Dame has given the "Catherine Hicks Award" to a graduating senior for outstanding work in theatre arts.

Hicks is an alumna of the Lee Strasberg Theatre and Film Institute and a trustee on the Hollywood Arts Council.

In 2005, Hicks appeared in a national public service announcement for Catholic Relief Services. She received the 2006 Padre Pio Award from the Capuchin Franciscan Friars for her efforts as Catholic Relief Services spokesperson and Darfur relief.

In 2010, she made appearances in several public service announcements for the Children's Advertising Review Unit (CARU).

She continued her commitment as a parent advocate by teaming with the National Community Pharmacists Association and Purdue Pharma for the 2010 Safeguard My Meds campaign to help prevent the abuse and misuse of prescription medication. Hicks appeared in a public service announcement for Catholic Relief Services in 2015.

In 2017, Hicks began working as a volunteer in California Congressman Adam Schiff's campaign office and for The League of Women Voters. She is also a member of the Los Angeles Homeless Action Committee.

== Filmography ==
=== Film ===
Year	Film	Role	Notes
1982	Death Valley	Sally	
1983	Better Late Than Never	Sable	
1984	Garbo Talks	Jane Mortimer	
1984	The Razor's Edge	Isabel Bradley	
1985	Fever Pitch	Flo	
1986	Peggy Sue Got Married	Carol Heath	
1986	Star Trek IV: The Voyage Home	Dr. Gillian Taylor	
1987	Like Father Like Son	Dr. Amy Larkin	
1988	The Secret of Monastery's Brandy	Ella Frazier	
1988	Child's Play	Karen Barclay	
1989	Souvenir	Tina Boyer	
1989	She's Out of Control	Janet Pearson	
1991	Liebestraum	Mary Parker	
1995	Dillinger and Capone	Abigail	
1995	Animal Room	Mrs. Mosk	
1997	Turbulence	Maggie	
1997	Eight Days a Week	Ms. Lewis	
2009	My Name Is Jerry	Dana Holderman	
2009	The Truth About Layla	Eleanor	
2010	The Genesis Code	Myra Allitt	
2011	Your Love Never Fails	Judge Cramer	Video
2011	Ghost Phone: Phone Calls from the Dead	Gertrude	
2011	Dorfman in Love	Rose	
2013	Reach	Linda	
2014	The Dog Who Saved Easter	Cressida	
2015	That Gal...Who Was In That Thing	Herself	Documentary

=== Television ===
Year	Title	Role	Notes
1976–1978	Ryan's Hope	Dr. Faith Coleridge	Contract role
1977	A.M. Chicago	Herself	Guest - Soap Opera Couples
1978	Sparrow	Valerie	TV movie
1979	Love for Rent	Annie	TV movie
1979–1980	The Bad News Bears	Dr. Emily Rappant	Main role
1980	To Race the Wind	Beth	TV movie
1980	Marilyn: The Untold Story	Marilyn Monroe	TV movie
1981	The Merv Griffin Show	Herself	Guest - Gifted Women
1981	Jacqueline Susann's Valley of the Dolls	Ann Welles	TV movie
1982–1983	Tucker's Witch	Amanda Tucker	Main role
1983	Happy Endings	Lisa Sage	TV movie
1986	Good Morning, America	Herself	Guest
1987	Laguna Heat	Jane Algernon	TV movie
1988	The Tonight Show Starring Johnny Carson	Herself	Guest
1989	The Tonight Show Starring Johnny Carson	Herself	Guest
1989	Spy	Angela Berk	TV movie
1990	Running Against Time	Laura Whittaker	TV movie
1991	Hi Honey – I'm Dead	Carol Stadler	TV movie
1992	Up to No Good	Allison Ploutzer	Pilot
1994	Diagnosis: Murder	Lauren Ridgeway	Episode: "Guardian Angel"
1994	Winnetka Road	Jeannie Barker	Main role
1994	The Martin Short Show	Wife	Pilot
1995	Redwood Curtain	Julia Riordan	TV movie
1995	Burke's Law	Pamela Crawford	Episode: "Who Killed the Lifeguard?"
1996–2007	7th Heaven	Annie Camden	Main role
1997	The Rosie O'Donnell Show	Herself	Guest
1998	The Howie Mandel Show	Herself	Guest
1998	Donny & Marie	Herself	Guest
2000	TV Guide Celebrity Dish	Herself	Guest
2000	For All Time	Kristen	TV movie
2002	Lifetime Now	Herself	Guest
2004	The Wayne Brady Show	Herself	Guest
2005	Soap Talk	Herself	Guest
2006	The Tony Danza Show	Herself	Guest
2008	Poison Ivy: The Secret Society	Elisabeth	TV movie
2009	Pushed	Dr. Rosen	TV movie
2009	Stranger with My Face	Shelley Stratton	TV movie
2010	Elf Sparkle and the Special Red Dress	Snowdorable (voice)	TV movie
2011	Borderline Murder	Jean	TV movie
2011	Game Time: Tackling the Past	Anna Walker	TV movie
2011	A Christmas Wedding Tail	Ellen	TV movie
2012	Shadow of Fear	Annette Bramble	TV movie
2012	A Christmas Wedding Date	Shirley	TV movie
2015	Win, Lose, or Love	Dot	TV movie
2015	A Christmas Reunion	Linda	TV movie
2016	Honeymoon From Hell	Hazel	TV movie
2020	JJ Villard's Fairy Tales	Fairy (voice)	Episode: "Pinocchio"
