= Middle Ages (TV series) =

American comedy-drama television series

- Genre: Comedy drama
- Created by: Stan Rogow
- Starring: Michael O'Keefe; Peter Riegert; Amy Brenneman; William Russ; Ashley Crow; Kyle Secor
- Composer: Jack Nitzsche
- Country of origin: United States
- Original language: English
- No. of seasons: 1
- No. of episodes: 6

Production
- Running time: 60 minutes
- Production companies: Stan Rogow Productions; Paramount Television

Original release
- Network: CBS
- Release: September 3 – October 1, 1992

Middle Ages is an American comedy-drama television series created by Stan Rogow, that aired on CBS from September 3 until October 1, 1992.

== Premise ==
Residents of a suburb of Chicago deal with their mid-life traumas.

== Cast ==
- Peter Riegert as Walter Cooper
- William Russ as Terry Hannon
- Ashley Crow as Cindy Nelson Cooper
- Michael O'Keefe as Ron Steffey
- James Gammon as Dave Nelson
- Amy Brenneman as Blanche
- Alex McKenna as Hillary Cooper
- Ryan McWhorter as Carson Cooper
- Kyle Secor as Brian Conover
- Maria Pitillo as Robin

== Episodes ==
No.	Title	Directed by	Written by	Original release date
1	"The Pig in the Python"	Unknown	Unknown	September 3, 1992
2	"Women in Love"	Unknown	Unknown	September 3, 1992
3	"Pygmalian in the Python"	Unknown	Unknown	September 10, 1992
4	"Night Moves"	Unknown	Unknown	September 17, 1992
5	"Forever Young"	Unknown	Unknown	September 24, 1992
Cindy's social life makes Walter re-evaluate his image. Dave meets his ex-wife.
6	"Murmur of the Heart"	Unknown	Unknown	October 1, 1992
Terry and Ron reflect on their lives after Walter's heart attack. Dave finds out that his new job means that he will be replacing Walter.
