= Robert Kaufman =

American film producer (1931–1991)

- Born: March 22, 1931; United States
- Died: November 21, 1991 (aged 60); Beverly Hills, California, United States
- Occupations: Screenwriter, television writer, film producer
- Spouse: Robin Krause
- Children: 4

Robert Kaufman (March 22, 1931 – November 21, 1991) was an American screenwriter, film producer and television writer known for such films and TV series as Getting Straight, Love at First Bite, Divorce American Style, The Cool Ones, Freebie and the Bean, How to Beat the High Co$t of Living, The Monkees, and The Ugliest Girl in Town.

== Biography ==
Born to a Jewish family on March 22, 1931, Kaufman attended Columbia University for three years before leaving to hitchhike across the US and Europe. He then took a job as a publicist for Mort Sahl in New York City and later as a comedy writer in the late 1950s including as a writer for Dick Shawn. In 1961, he moved to Los Angeles where he focused on television scripts before landing his first film credit in 1965 for Ski Party.

In 1983, he signed a non-exclusive deal at Universal Pictures, where Kaufman worked as a writer-producer for the film studio.

== Personal life ==
Kaufman was raised in Westport, Connecticut, and attended Staples High School. In a December 30, 1970, television appearance on The Dick Cavett Show, Kaufman revealed that when his family moved to the town in 1941 they were the first Jewish family to reside in Westport.

He was married three times. He had four children from his first marriage: Melissa, Robin, Richard, and Christopher. His third wife was Robin Krause.

Kaufman died in 1991. Services were held at Hillside Memorial Park.
