= List of Westport Country Playhouse performers =

Westport Country Playhouse notable performers include

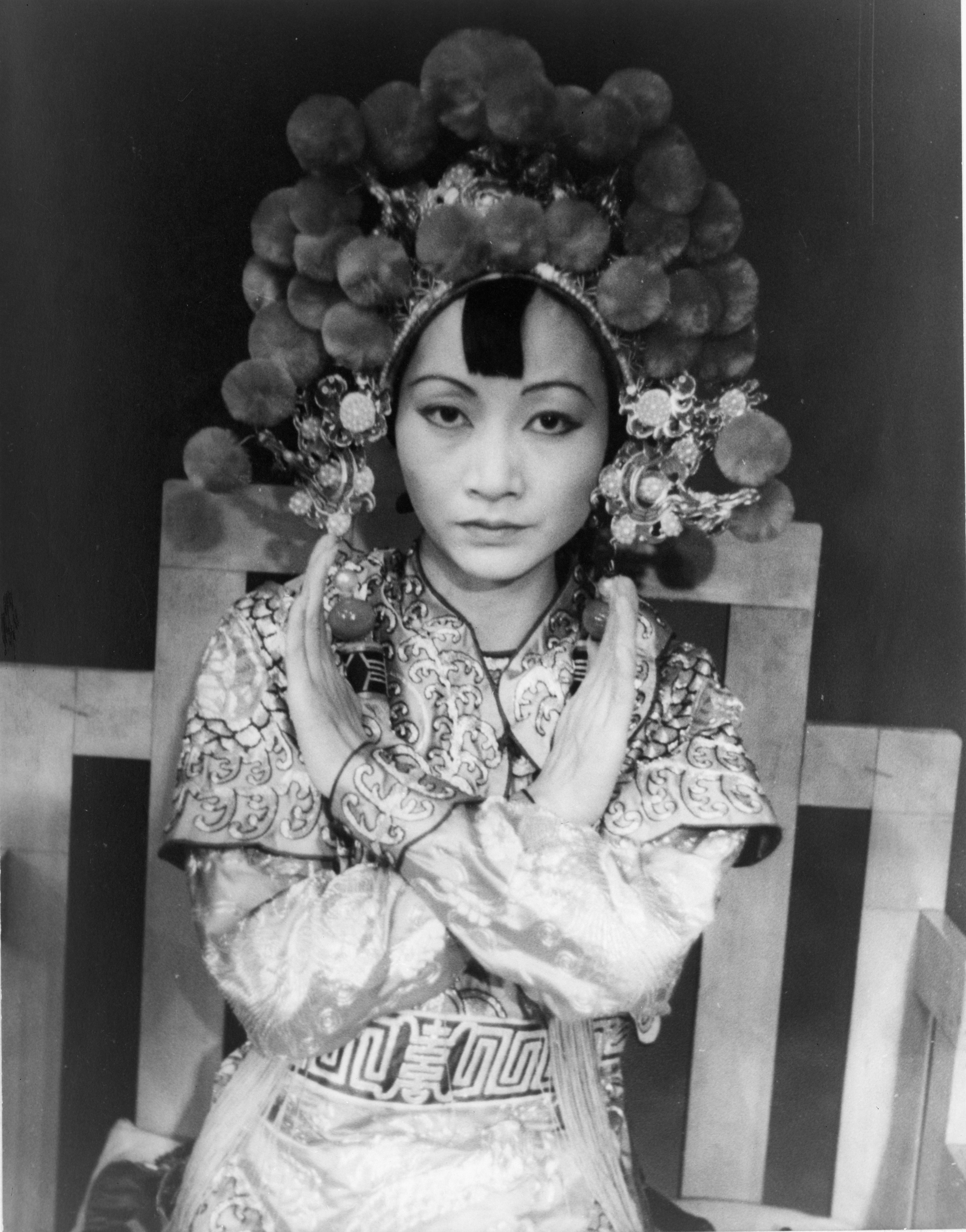
Carl Van Vechten photo portrait of Anna May Wong, in costume for a dramatic adaptation of Puccini's Turandot at Westport, August 11, 1937

- 1933: Kitty Carlisle in Champagne Sec
- 1934: Burgess Meredith in Hide and Seek
- 1935: Ruth Gordon in The Country Wife
- 1936:
  - Eva Le Gallienne in Love for Love and Camille
  - Dorothy Gish in Russet Mantle
- 1937: Henry Fonda in The Virginian
- 1938: Ethel Barrymore in The Constant Wife
- 1939:
  - Gene Kelly, Betty Comden, and Adolph Green in Magazine Page
  - Ruth Gordon in Here Today
- 1940: Paul Robeson in The Emperor Jones
- 1941: Tyrone Power in Liliom directed by Lee Strasberg.
- 1942–1945:The Westport Country Playhouse closed because of World War II
- 1946:
  - June Havoc in They Knew What They Wanted
  - Olivia de Havilland in What Every Woman Knows
  - Thornton Wilder as the stage manager for Our Town
- 1947: Tallulah Bankhead in Private Lives
- 1948: Thornton Wilder in The Skin of Our Teeth
- 1949:
  - Helen Hayes and Mary MacArthur in Good Housekeeping
  - Carl Reiner in Pretty Penny
- 1950:
  - Maureen Stapleton in My Fiddle Has Three Strings
  - Maurice Evans in The Devil's Disciple
  - Franchot Tone in The Second Man
  - Basil Rathbone in The Winslow Boy
- 1951:
  - Claudette Colbert in Island Fling
  - Olivia de Havilland in Candida
- 1952: John Forsythe in Dangerous Corner and The Hasty Heart
- 1953:
  - Eva Gabor in Sailor's Delight and The Play's the Thing
  - Lillian Gish in The Trip to Bountiful
- 1954:
  - Imogene Coca in Happy Birthday
  - Richard Kiley in Candle-Light
- 1955:
  - Richard Kiley in Heaven Can Wait
  - Eva Marie Saint in The Rainmaker (play)
- 1956:
  - Lillian Gish and Dorothy Gish in The Chalk Garden
  - Bea Lillie in Beasop's Fables
- 1957:
  - Eartha Kitt in Mrs. Patterson
  - Jessica Tandy and Hume Cronyn in Man in the Dog Suit
- 1958:
  - Groucho Marx in A Time for Elizabeth
  - Bert Lahr in Visit to a Small Planet
- 1959:
  - Eli Wallach and Anne Jackson in The Glass Menagerie
  - Tony Randall in Arms and the Man
- 1960:
  - Joan Fontaine in Susan and God
  - Jane Fonda in No Concern of Mine
  - Mike Nichols and Elaine May in An Evening with Mike Nichols and Elaine May
- 1961:
  - Cyril Ritchard and Cornelia Otis Skinner in The Pleasure of His Company
  - Gloria Swanson in Between Seasons
- 1962:
  - Tallulah Bankhead in Here Today
  - Sammy Davis Jr. in The Desperate Hours
- 1963:
  - Teresa Wright in Tchin-Tchin
  - Carol Channing in The Millionairess
  - Hermione Gingold in Oh Dad, Poor Dad, Mamma's Hung You in the Closet and I'm Feelin' So Sad
- 1964:
  - Joel Grey in Stop the World – I Want to Get Off
  - Helen Hayes in The White House
- 1965:
  - Michael Allinson, Dina Merrill, Lois Nettleton, and Bramwell Fletcher in the George Bernard Shaw Repertory Festival
  - Tammy Grimes in The Private Ear and the Public Eye
  - Joan Fontaine in The Unexpected Guest
- 1966:
  - Cicely Tyson and Alan Alda in The Owl and the Pussycat
  - Tom Ewell in Life With Father
- 1967:
  - Barbara Bel Geddes in Wait Until Dark
  - E. G. Marshall in A Singular Man
  - Betsy Palmer in Luv
- 1968:
  - Geraldine Page in The Little Foxes
  - Shirley Booth in Desk Set
- 1969: Keir Dullea and Maureen O'Sullivan in Butterflies Are Free
- 1970:
  - Noel Harrison in Blithe Spirit
  - Shirley Booth in Best of Friends
- 1971:
  - Colleen Dewhurst in The Big Coca Cola Swamp in the Sky
  - Geraldine Page and Rip Torn in Marriage & Money
- 1972:
  - Mickey Rooney in See How They Run
  - Robert Stack in Remember Me
- 1973:
  - José Ferrer in A Song for Cyrano
  - Art Carney in The Prisoner of Second Avenue
- 1974: Jack Gilford and Lou Jacobi in The Sunshine Boys
- 1975:
  - Lynn Redgrave in The Two of Us
  - Theodore Bikel in The Good Doctor
  - Tammy Grimes in In Praise of Love
- 1976: Eva Marie Saint in Fatal Weakness
- 1977: Jane Alexander and Richard Kiley in The Master Builder
- 1978:
  - Douglas Fairbank, Jr. in Out on a Limb
  - Louis Jordan in 13 Rue De L'Amour
- 1979: Vincent Price in Diversions & Delights
- 1980:
  - Sada Thompson in Children
  - Richard Thomas in Whose Life is it Anyway?
- 1981: Eva Le Gallienne in To Grandmother's House We Go
- 1982: Eileen Heckart in What I Did Last Summer
- 1983: Shelley Winters in 84, Charing Cross Road
- 1984: Betsy Palmer in Breakfast with Les and Bess
- 1985: Christopher Walken and Katharine Houghton in A Bill of Development
- 1986: Colleen Dewhurst in Real Estate
- 1987: George Grizzard in The Perfect Party
- 1988: Arlene Francis and David Birney in Social Security
- 1989: Elizabeth Ashley in All the Queen's Men
- 1990: Fritz Weaver and Elizabeth Wilson in The Cocktail Hour
- 1991: Juliet Mills in Dangerous Obsession
- 1992: Tony Roberts in The Fourth Wall
- 1993: Charles Cioffi in The Substance of Fire
- 1994: Elaine May and Gene Saks in Intimate Exchanges
- 1996: Charles Durning, James Handy, and Dan Lauria in Men in Suits
- 1997: Jean Powell, Anne Meara, Jerry Stiller and Paul Benedict in After-Play
- 1998: Jean Stapleton in Eleanor - Her Secret Journey
- 1999:
  - James Naughton in Street of Dreams
  - Michael Learned and Ralph Waite in Chasing Monsters
- 2000:
  - Paul Newman, Joanne Woodward, James Naughton, Swoosie Kurtz, Jane Curtin and Fritz Weaver in Ancestral Voices
  - Bronson Pinchot in Nicolette & Aucassin
- 2001:
  - Gene Wilder in Don't Make Me Laugh
  - Leslie Uggams and Bruce Weitz in Heaven Can Wait
  - Karen Allen and Chad Allen in Temporary Help
- 2002: Paul Newman, Jayne Atkinson, Frank Converse, Jane Curtin and Jeffrey DeMunn in Our Town
- 2006: James Earl Jones in Thurgood
