= Retro Productions =

New York City theatre company

Retro Productions is a New York City based Off-Off-Broadway theater company. Their mission is to produce works of "Retro Theater," mainly straight plays that take place in the 20th century.

The company is composed of twenty-two members who are actors, designers, directors, and stage managers, and is led by artistic director Heather E. Cunningham, an actress and producer. whose performance as Rose Walker in the Retro production An Appeal to the Woman of the House by Christie Perfetti Williams won her a New York Innovative Theatre Award for Best Actress in a Lead Role.

== History ==
The company was formed in 2005 under the name River Heights Productions, after the hometown of Nancy Drew. Under this name the company produced two plays: Catholic School Girls by Casey Kurtti, in March 2005, at chashama and the New York City Premiere of Mrs. California by Doris Baizley, in March 2006, at the 78th Street Theatre Lab.

Following the production of Mrs. California, River Heights Productions was dissolved and the company was renamed Retro Productions.

After the reformation of Retro Productions, they took up residence at the Spoon Theater, producing two shows per year at the 38th street space in Manhattan. The Spoon Theater closed in 2011, and since then the company have become "gypsies" - moving from venue to venue based on the needs of the show, though, since 2015, primarily use the Gene Frankel Theatre on Bond Street.

== Premieres and other significant productions ==
- Produced the first major New York City revival in over fifty years of the 1950s sex comedy The Tender Trap by Max Shulman and Robert Paul Smith.
- New York premiere of Holy Days by Sally Nemeth.
- World Premiere of Women and War by Jack Hilton Cunningham.
- Production of The Runner Stumbles by Milan Stitt moved off-Broadway.
- World Premiere of An Appeal to the Woman of the House by Christie Perfetti Williams.

== Productions and awards ==
Retro Productions has been nominated for a total of 21 New York Innovative Theatre Awards since the company was founded, winning two.

In 2014 Retro was nominated for three awards: Outstanding Premiere Production, Outstanding Full Length Script (Christie Perfetti Williams) and Outstanding Actress in a Lead Role (Heather E. Cunningham - who won this honor) for An Appeal to the Woman of the House.

In 2012 Casandera MJ Lollar was nominated for Outstanding Actress in a Lead Role for playing Sister Rita in The Runner Stumbles.

In 2011 they received four nominations: Outstanding Production of Benefactors by Michael Frayn as well as Outstanding Actress in a Lead Role for Kristen Vaughan (who won that honor that year) and Heather E. Cunningham, and Outstanding Ensemble. The fourth nomination was for the Set Design for Dear Ruth, designed by Jeff Stander.

Six nominations were given in honor of their May 2010 production of The Desk Set by William Marchant. Included were nominations for Outstanding Set Design (Rebecca Cunningham), Outstanding Costume Design (Viviane Galloway), Outstanding Sound Design (Jeanne Travis), Innovative Design (Heather E. Cunningham and Casandera M.J. Lollar for Properties Design), and Outstanding Leading Actress (Kristen Vaughan).

In 2008, five nominations were awarded for their production of Mill Fire by Sally Nemeth. They included nominations for Outstanding Leading Actress (Lauren Kelston), Outstanding Leading Actress (Kristen Vaughan), Outstanding Lighting Design (Kerrie Lovercheck), Outstanding Set Design (Jack and Rebecca Cunningham), and Outstanding Sound Design (Amy Altadonna). Their sixth nomination that year was for Outstanding Costume Design (Rebecca Cunningham) for their production of What I Did Last Summer by A.R. Gurney.

In 2007 Heather E. Cunningham's portrayal of Cheryl in Still Life: A Documentary by Emily Mann was named a 2007 Back Stage Performance to Remember.

=== List of productions ===
- Catholic School Girls by Casey Kurtti (as River Heights Productions), March 2005
- Mrs. California by Doris Baizley (as River Heights Productions), March 2006
- Still Life: A Documentary by Emily Mann, March 2007
- What I Did Last Summer by A.R. Gurney, November 2007
- Mill Fire by Sally Nemeth, May 2008
- The Tender Trap by Max Shulman and Robert Paul Smith, November 2008
- When You Comin' Back, Red Ryder? by Mark Medoff, May 2009
- Holy Days by Sally Nemeth, November 2009
- Women and War by Jack Hilton Cunningham, May 2010
- The Desk Set by William Marchant, May 2010
- Benefactors by Michael Frayn, November 2010
- Dear Ruth by Norman Krasna, May 2011
- The Runner Stumbles by Milan Stitt, November 2011 and May 2012
- A Day in the Death of Joe Egg by Peter Nichols, May 2013
- The Baltimore Waltz by Paula Vogel, November 2013
- An Appeal to the Woman of the House by Christie Perfetti Williams, May 2014
- The Butter and Egg Man by George S. Kaufmann, May 2015
- Good Boys and True by Roberto Aguirre-Secasa, November–December 2015
- And Miss Reardon Drinks A Little by Paul Zindel, May 2017
