= Crazy Mary =

Play by A.R. Gurney

Crazy Mary is a play by A.R. Gurney (The Dining Room; Mrs. Farnsworth; The Cocktail Hour) that had its world premiere at Playwrights Horizons in New York City from May 11 to June 26, 2007. The cast included Kristine Nielsen as Mary, Sigourney Weaver as Lydia and Michael Esper as Skip. Scenic design was by John Lee Beatty (The Color Purple; Chicago; Talley's Folly), costume design by Claudia Brown (Blue in the Face; Psych), lighting design by Brian Aldous (Mrs. Farnsworth; Blue Man Group: Tubes) and sound design by Jill BC DuBoff. Janet Takami served as the production stage manager. The play was directed by Jim Simpson (Mrs. Farnsworth; Psych) and was staged on PH's Mainstage Theater.

Crazy Mary follows the scion of a wealthy Buffalo, New York family and her willful, college-aged son. In an attempt to account for the family inheritance, they visit their long-lost cousin Mary. The catch: Mary is living in an asylum, and has barely spoken in years, forcing the mother and son to employ radical methods to communicate with her. The play premiered on May 11, 2007 to sellout crowds, and its run was extended by a week beyond its original closing date.

Critical reviews were indifferent. The play has since been performed in community theaters in Florida and elsewhere.

== Publication ==
Crazy Mary is published by Broadway Play Publishing Inc.
