= Broadway Play Publishing =

Broadway Play Publishing Inc
- Company type: Private
- Founded: New York City, USA (1982)
- Website: www.broadwayplaypublishing.com

Broadway Play Publishing Inc (BPPI) was established in New York City in 1982 to publish and license the stage performance rights of contemporary American plays. The Broadway Play Publishing Inc catalog consists of over 1,300 plays and over 400 authors, such as: Constance Congdon, María Irene Fornés, A. R. Gurney, Tony Kushner, Neil LaBute, Richard Nelson, Eric Overmyer, José Rivera, Naomi Wallace, and many others. Its authors have been produced on Broadway and Off, in London's West End, and in theaters across the United States and around the world. They have won Nobel Prizes, Pulitzer Prizes, Tony Awards, Obie Awards, the MacArthur Genius Grant, Guggenheim Fellowships, and National Endowment for the Arts grants. Christopher W.D. Gould is the publisher, and Michael Q. Fellmeth is the executive director.

== Playwrights ==
- JoAnne Akalaitis
- Phil Austin
- Thomas Babe
- Eric Bentley
- Glen Berger
- Peter Bergman
- Brooke Berman
- Alan Bowne
- Victor Bumbalo
- Jack Canfora
- Steve Carter
- Suzy McKee Charnas
- Robert Chesley
- Anthony Clarvoe
- Daniel Damiano
- Christopher Denham
- Charles Evered
- María Irene Fornés
- Judy GeBauer
- Anthony Giardina
- Jeff Goode
- David Greenspan
- A. R. Gurney
- Mark Harelik
- Allan Havis
- Davey Holmes
- Willy Holtzman
- C. J. Hopkins
- Tom Jacobson
- Sherry Kramer
- Tony Kushner
- Neil LaBute
- Elaine Lee
- Adam Long
- Emily Mann
- Marlane Meyer
- Richard Nelson
- Brett Neveu
- Qui Nguyen
- Dan O'Brien
- David Ossman
- Eric Overmyer
- Rochelle Owens
- Robert Patrick
- Sybille Pearson
- John Pielmeier
- Phil Proctor
- Frank Pugliese
- Aishah Rahman
- Adam Rapp
- Phil Reeves
- José Rivera
- Jonathan J. Samarro
- Anne Sexton
- Betty Shamieh
- Daniel Singer
- John Strand
- Bryan Stubbles
- Joe Sutton
- Daniel Therriault
- Megan Terry
- Trish Vradenburg
- Naomi Wallace
- David Wiltse
- Jess Winfield

• Joe Pintauro

== Plays ==
- Angels In America
- Autobahn
- Bash: Latter-Day Plays
- A Bright Room Called Day
- Cloud Tectonics
- The Complete Works of William Shakespeare (Abridged)
- Crazy Mary
- Day of the Dog
- Far East
- Fat Pig
- Fefu and Her Friends
- The Illusion
- In a Dark Dark House
- Indian Blood (play)
- The Mercy Seat
- More Lies About Jerzy
- On The Verge
- One Flea Spare
- Pecong
- Post Mortem
- Sarita
- The Shape of Things
- Slaughter City
- Slavs!
- Some Girl(s)
- Starstruck
- This Is How It Goes
- To Gillian On Her 37th Birthday
- Underneath the Lintel
- Viet Rock
- Wrecks
