= Mary Tyler Moore =

American actress and television producer (1936–2017)

- Moore in 1978
- Born: December 29, 1936; New York City, New York, U.S.
- Died: January 25, 2017 (aged 80); Greenwich, Connecticut, U.S.
- Resting place: Oak Lawn Cemetery, Fairfield, Connecticut, U.S.
- Occupations: Actress; producer; activist
- Years active: 1955–2013
- Spouses: Richard Meeker (m. 1955; div. 1962); Grant Tinker (m. 1962; div. 1981); Robert Levine (m. 1983)
- Children: 1

Mary Tyler Moore (December 29, 1936 – January 25, 2017) was an American actress, producer, and social advocate. She is best known for her television roles on The Dick Van Dyke Show (1961–1966) and The Mary Tyler Moore Show (1970–1977), which "helped define a new vision of American womanhood" and "appealed to an audience facing the new trials of modern-day existence". She won seven Primetime Emmy Awards, three Golden Globe Awards, and two Tony Awards.

Moore was nominated for the Academy Award for Best Actress for her performance in the drama film Ordinary People (1980). She had major supporting roles in the musical film Thoroughly Modern Millie (1967) and the dark comedy film Flirting with Disaster (1996). Moore also received praise for her performance in the television film Heartsounds (1984).

Moore was an advocate for animal rights and vegetarianism in addition to her acting career. She was also a significant contributor to causes for diabetes awareness and research. She was diagnosed with type 1 diabetes at age 33.

== Early life ==
Moore was born December 29, 1936, in the Brooklyn Heights neighborhood in New York City, the first child of Marjorie (née Hackett) and George Tyler Moore, a clerk. She had one younger brother, John, and a younger sister, Elizabeth. Moore's paternal great-grandfather, Confederate Lieutenant Colonel Lewis Tilghman Moore, owned the house that is now the Stonewall Jackson's Headquarters Museum in Winchester, Virginia. The family was of Irish Catholic descent and Moore was raised Catholic.

Moore spent her early childhood in Flatbush, of which she recalled: "[We] and one other family were the only Catholics in an Orthodox Jewish community where my grandfather owned the house that we would live in." She attended St. Rose of Lima Parochial School in Brooklyn. The family also resided in Flushing, Queens, for a time. Moore's parents were both alcoholics, and she and her siblings were sometimes placed in the care of relatives.

The family relocated to Los Angeles, California, in 1945 when she was 8 years old, at the recommendation of her uncle, an employee of MCA. Moore attended Saint Ambrose School and Immaculate Heart High School in Los Feliz in Los Angeles.

Moore's sister Elizabeth died at age 21 from a drug overdose. Her brother died at the age of 47 from kidney cancer.

== Career ==
=== Television ===
==== Early appearances ====
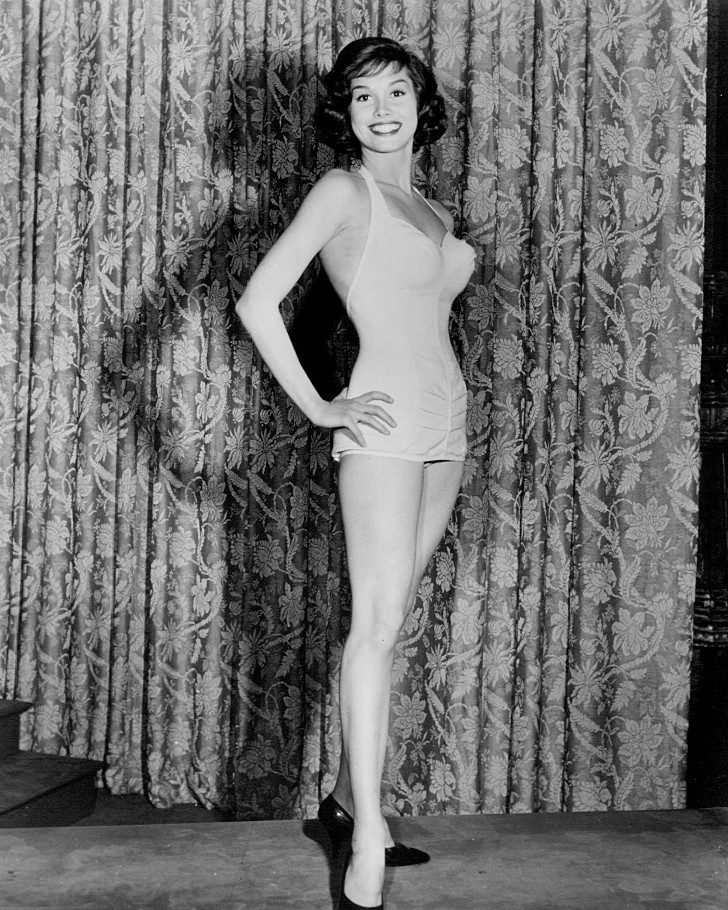
Moore in Johnny Staccato (1960)

Moore's television career began in 1955 with a job as "Happy Hotpoint", a tiny elf dancing on Hotpoint home appliances in TV commercials that ran during breaks on The Adventures of Ozzie and Harriet. After appearing in 39 Hotpoint commercials in five days, she received approximately $6,000 (equivalent to $58,000 in 2025). She became pregnant while still working as "Happy", and Hotpoint ended her work when it became too difficult to conceal her pregnancy with the elf costume.

Moore was an uncredited photographic model for record album covers, many for the Tops Records label, and auditioned for the role of the elder daughter of Danny Thomas for his long-running TV show, but was turned down. Much later, Thomas explained that "she missed it by a nose ... no daughter of mine could ever have a nose that small".

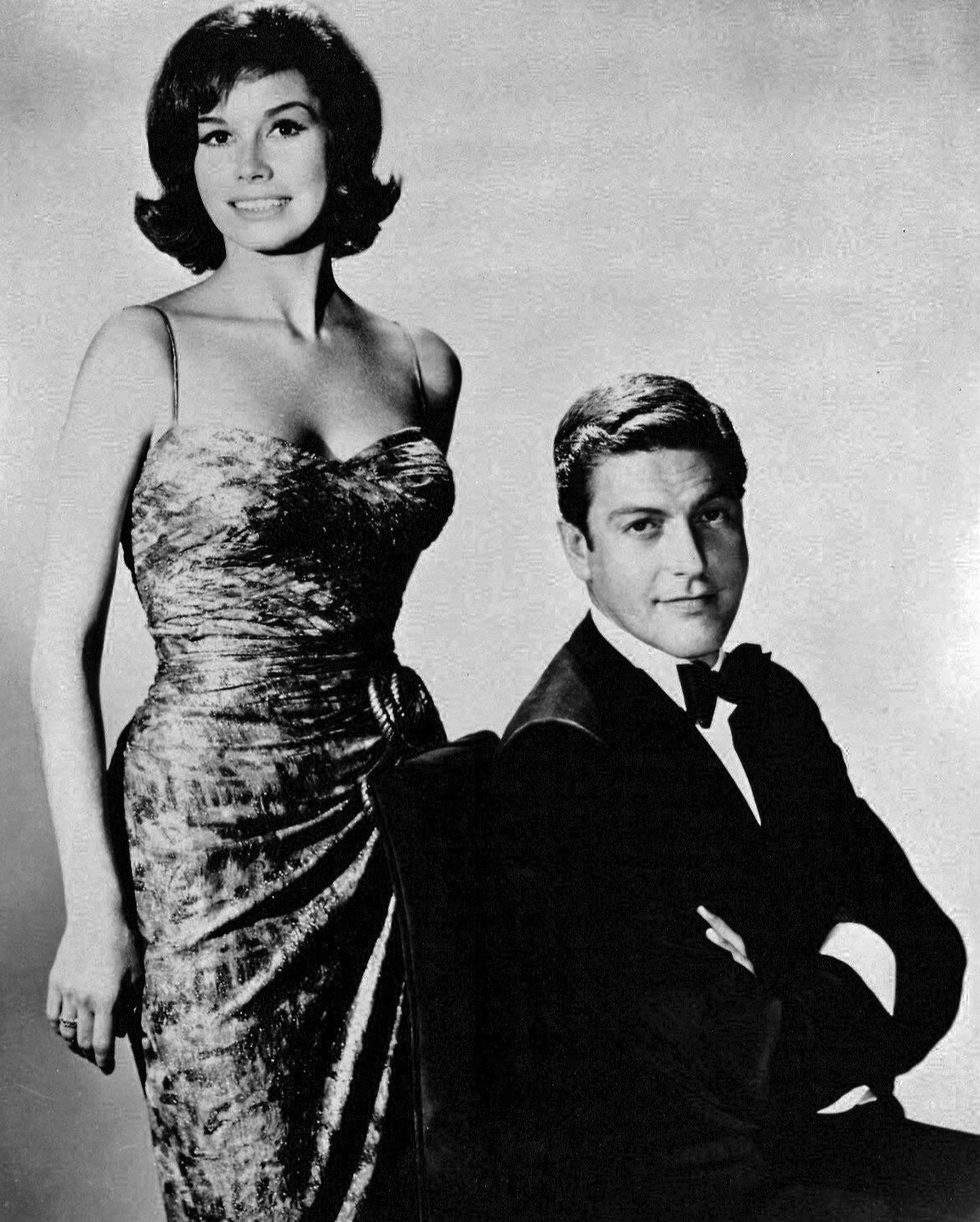
Moore with Dick Van Dyke in 1964

Moore's first regular television role was as 'Sam', a mysterious and glamorous telephone switchboard operator/receptionist in the series Richard Diamond, Private Detective, which starred David Janssen. Sam's sultry voice was heard talking to Richard Diamond from her switchboard; however, only her legs and occasionally her hands appeared on camera—never her face, adding to the character's mystique. After creating a minor sensation by appearing as Sam in 12 episodes of Richard Diamond as an uncredited player, Moore asked for a raise—and was promptly fired by the show's producers and replaced by Roxane Brooks in the role. However, Moore was able to parlay the publicity from 'revealing' Sam's identity to the press into several flattering articles and profiles, giving her career a boost.

About this time, she guest-starred in John Cassavetes' NBC detective series Johnny Staccato, and also in the series premiere of The Tab Hunter Show in September 1960 and the Bachelor Father episode "Bentley and the Big Board" in December 1960. In 1961, Moore appeared in several big parts in movies and on television, including Bourbon Street Beat; 77 Sunset Strip; Surfside 6; Wanted: Dead or Alive with Steve McQueen; Steve Canyon; Hawaiian Eye; Thriller and Lock-Up. She also appeared in a February 1962 episode of Straightaway.

==== The Dick Van Dyke Show (1961–1966) ====
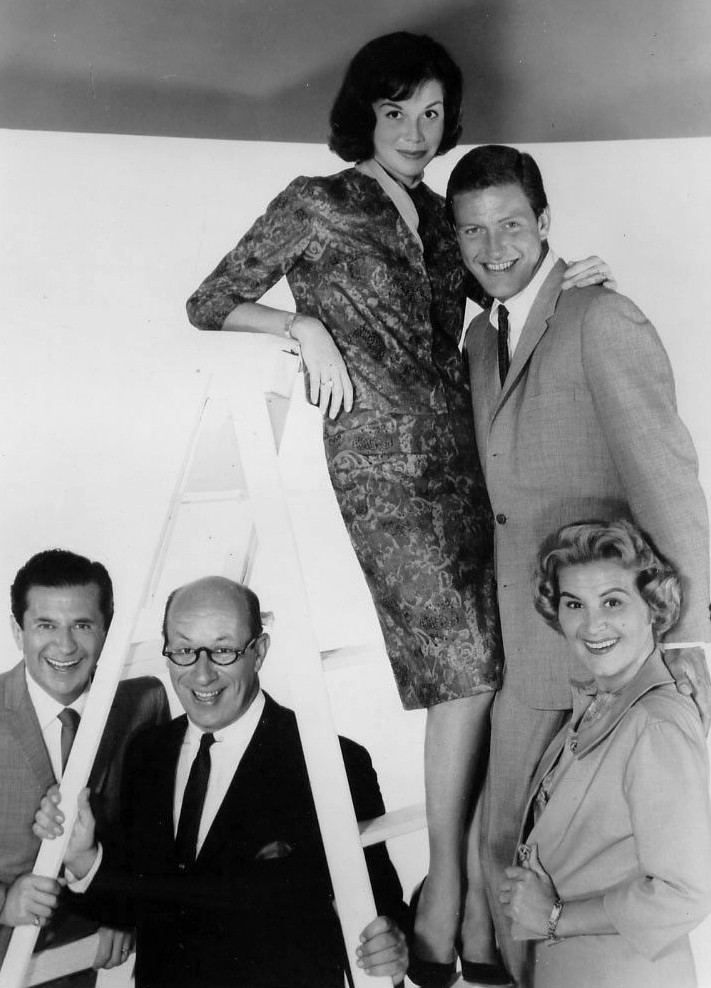
Dick Van Dyke Show cast: Morey Amsterdam, Richard Deacon, Moore, Dick Van Dyke, and Rose Marie, 1962

In 1961, Carl Reiner cast Moore in The Dick Van Dyke Show, a weekly series based on Reiner's own life and career as a writer for Sid Caesar's television variety show Your Show of Shows, telling the cast from the outset that it would run for no more than five years. The show was produced by Danny Thomas's company, and Thomas himself recommended her. He remembered Moore as "the girl with three names" whom he had turned down earlier.

Moore's energetic comic performances as Van Dyke's character's wife, begun at age 24 (eleven years Van Dyke's junior), made both the actress and her signature fitted capri pants popular, and she became internationally known. When she won her first Emmy Award for her portrayal of Laura Petrie, she said, "I know this will never happen again." As Laura Petrie, Moore often wore styles that recalled the fashion of Jackie Kennedy, such as capri pants, echoing an ideal of the Kennedy administration's Camelot.

==== The Mary Tyler Moore Show (1970–1977) ====
Moore and husband Grant Tinker successfully pitched a sitcom that centered on Moore to CBS, in 1970, after performing in the one-hour musical special Dick Van Dyke and the Other Woman. The Mary Tyler Moore Show was a half-hour newsroom sitcom featuring Ed Asner as her gruff boss Lou Grant. The Mary Tyler Moore Show bridged aspects of the Women's Movement with mainstream culture by portraying an independent woman whose life focused on her professional career rather than marriage and family.

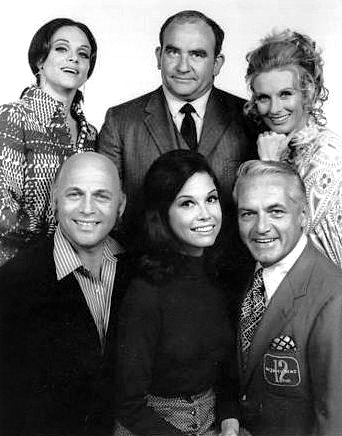
The original cast of The Mary Tyler Moore Show (1970) Top: Valerie Harper (Rhoda), Ed Asner (Lou Grant), Cloris Leachman (Phyllis). Bottom: Gavin MacLeod (Murray), Moore, Ted Knight (Ted)

The show marked the first big hit for film and television producer James L. Brooks, who also did more work for Moore and Tinker's production company. Moore's show proved so popular that three regular characters, Valerie Harper as Rhoda Morgenstern, Cloris Leachman as Phyllis Lindstrom, and Ed Asner as Lou Grant spun off into their own three separate series playing the same characters, albeit with Lou Grant being an hour-long drama instead of a half-hour sitcom.

The premise of the single working woman's life, alternating during the program between work and home, became a television staple.

The show spent six years in the top 20 of the ratings, then slipped to number 39 in season seven. The producers decided that the show should end, afraid that the show's legacy might be damaged if it were renewed for another season. The 1977 season won its third straight Emmy Award for Outstanding Comedy despite the decline in the ratings. The program won 29 Emmys and Moore won three awards for Best Lead Actress in a Comedy in seven seasons. The record was unbroken until 2002, when the NBC sitcom Frasier won its 30th Emmy.

==== Later projects ====
Moore appeared in Mary's Incredible Dream, on January 22, 1976, while season six of The Mary Tyler Moore Show was in progress. This show was an experimental musical/variety special for CBS, that also featured Ben Vereen. She described it as "a totally different concept from anything ever attempted on television... We go from song to dance to song and back again, telling a story of the eternal cycle of man. They can just enjoy the music and dancing, if the viewers don't want to follow the story." She starred in a second CBS special, How to Survive the '70s and Maybe Even Bump Into Happiness, in 1978 where she received significant support from a strong lineup of guest stars: Bill Bixby, John Ritter, Harvey Korman and Dick Van Dyke. Moore also starred in two unsuccessful CBS variety series in the 1978–79 season. The first, Mary, featured David Letterman, Michael Keaton, Swoosie Kurtz and Dick Shawn in the supporting cast. CBS brought Moore back in March 1979 in a new, retooled show, The Mary Tyler Moore Hour, after the series was canceled. This format was described as a "sit-var" (part situation comedy/part variety series). Moore portrayed a TV star putting on a variety show. The program lasted just 11 episodes.

Moore returned to CBS in the 1985–86 season in a sitcom titled Mary, which suffered from poor reviews, sagging ratings, and strife within the production crew. Moore said she asked network to pull the show because she was unhappy with the direction and production. Moore also starred in the short-lived Annie McGuire in 1988. Moore returned in 1995, after another lengthy break from TV series work. She was cast as tough, unsympathetic newspaper owner Louise "the Dragon" Felcott on the CBS drama New York News, the third series in which her character was involved in the news media. Moore was disappointed with the writing of her character and was negotiating with producers to get out of her contract for the series when it was canceled.

Moore appeared as herself in the mid-1990s on two episodes of Ellen. She guest-starred on Ellen DeGeneres's The Ellen Show, in 2001. Moore reunited in 2004 with her Dick Van Dyke Show castmates for a reunion special, The Dick Van Dyke Show Revisited.

Moore guest-starred in 2006 as Christine St. George, the high-strung host of a fictional TV show, in three episodes of the Fox sitcom That '70s Show. Moore's scenes were shot on the same sound stage where The Mary Tyler Moore Show was filmed in the 1970s. She made a guest appearance on the season two premiere of Hot in Cleveland, which starred her former co-star Betty White. It marked the first time that White and Moore had worked together since The Mary Tyler Moore Show ended in 1977. Moore reprised her role on Hot in Cleveland in the fall of 2013, in a season four episode that reunited Moore and White with former Mary Tyler Moore Show cast members Cloris Leachman, Valerie Harper and Georgia Engel. The reunion coincided with Harper's public announcement that she had been diagnosed with terminal brain cancer and was given only a few months to live, though she would outlive Moore by two years.

=== Theater ===
Moore appeared in several Broadway plays. She was the star of a new musical version of Breakfast at Tiffany's in December 1966, but the show, titled Holly Golightly, was a flop that closed in previews before opening on Broadway. In reviews of performances in Philadelphia and Boston, critics "murdered" the play in which Moore claimed to be singing with bronchial pneumonia.

She starred in a gender-reversed revival of Whose Life Is It Anyway? with James Naughton, which opened on Broadway at the Royale Theatre on February 24, 1980, and ran for 96 performances, and in Sweet Sue, which opened at the Music Box Theatre on January 8, 1987, later transferred to the Royale Theatre, and ran for 164 performances.

Moore and her production company produced five plays during the 1980s: Noises Off, The Octette Bridge Club, A Day in the Death of Joe Egg, Benefactors, and Safe Sex.

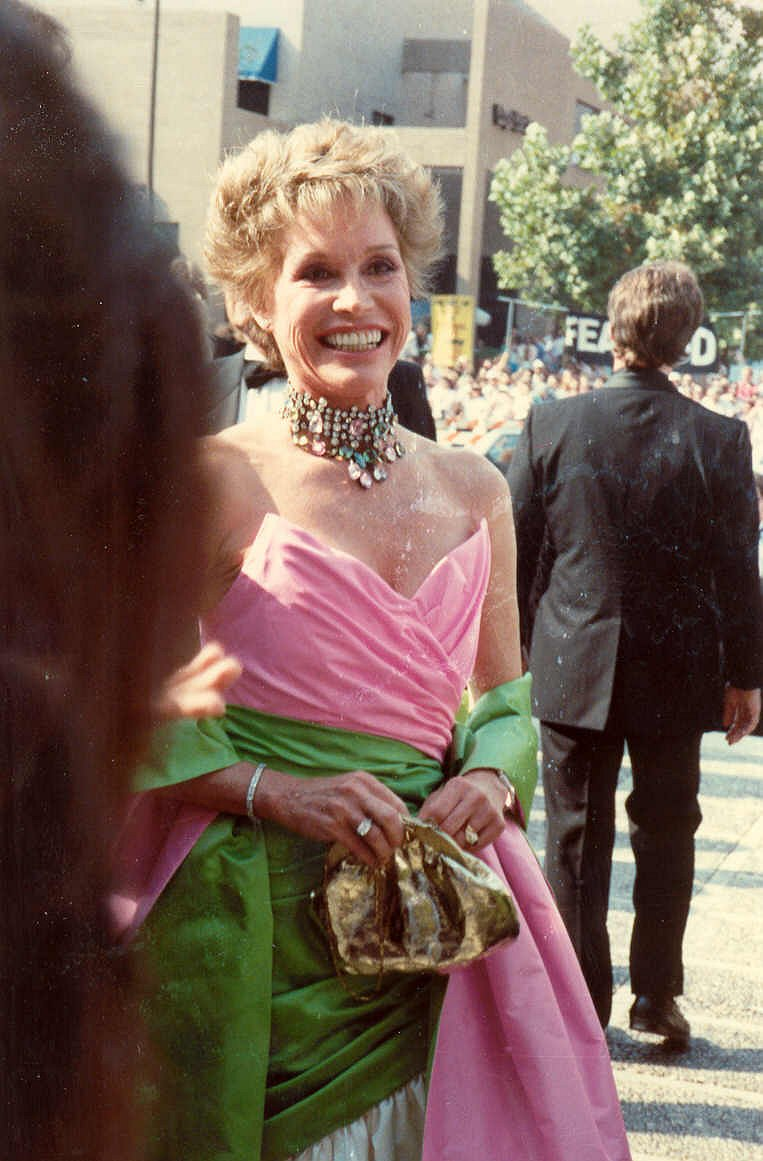
Moore at the 40th Primetime Emmy Awards in 1988

Moore appeared in previews of the Neil Simon play Rose's Dilemma at the off-Broadway Manhattan Theatre Club in December 2003 but quit the production after receiving a critical letter from Simon instructing her to "learn your lines or get out of my play". Moore had been using an earpiece on stage to feed her lines to the repeatedly rewritten play.

=== Films ===
Moore made her film debut as a nurse in the Jack Lemmon comedy Operation Mad Ball (1957). Her first speaking part came in X-15 (1961). Following her success on The Dick Van Dyke Show, she appeared in a string of films in the late 1960s (after signing an exclusive contract with Universal Pictures), including Thoroughly Modern Millie (1967), as a would-be actress in 1920s New York who is taken under the wing of Julie Andrews' title character, and two comedic films released in 1968, What's So Bad About Feeling Good? with George Peppard, and Don't Just Stand There! with Robert Wagner. She starred opposite Elvis Presley as a nun in Change of Habit (1969). Moore's future television castmate Ed Asner appeared in the film as a police officer.

Moore returned to the big screen in the coming-of-age drama Ordinary People (1980). She received an Oscar nomination for her portrayal of a grieving mother trying to cope with the drowning death of a son and the suicide attempt of another son (played by Timothy Hutton who won the Academy Award for Best Supporting Actor for his performance). Moore appeared in only two more films during the next fifteen years: Six Weeks (1982) and Just Between Friends (1986). She appeared in the independent hit Flirting with Disaster (1996).

Moore was in the television movie Run a Crooked Mile (1969) and starred in several television movies including First, You Cry (1978), which brought her an Emmy nomination for portraying NBC correspondent Betty Rollin's struggle with breast cancer. Her later TV movies included the medical drama Heartsounds (1984) with James Garner, which brought her another Emmy nomination, Finnegan Begin Again (1985) with Robert Preston, which earned her a CableACE Award nomination, the 1988 mini-series Lincoln, which brought her another Emmy nomination for playing Mary Todd Lincoln, and Stolen Babies, for which she won an Emmy Award for Outstanding Supporting Actress in 1993. Later she reunited with former co-stars in Mary and Rhoda (2000) with Valerie Harper, and The Gin Game (2003) (based on the Broadway play), with Dick Van Dyke. Moore starred in Like Mother, Like Son (2001), playing convicted murderer Sante Kimes.

=== Memoirs ===
Moore wrote two memoirs. In the first, After All, published in 1995, she acknowledged being a recovering alcoholic, while in Growing Up Again: Life, Loves, and Oh Yeah, Diabetes (2009), she focused on living with type 1 diabetes.

=== MTM Enterprises ===
Moore and her husband Grant Tinker founded MTM Enterprises, Inc. in 1969, which produced The Mary Tyler Moore Show and other successful television shows and films. It also included a record label, MTM Records. MTM Enterprises produced American sitcoms and drama television series such as Rhoda, Lou Grant and Phyllis (all spin-offs from The Mary Tyler Moore Show), The Bob Newhart Show, The Texas Wheelers, The Bob Crane Show, Three for the Road, The Tony Randall Show, WKRP in Cincinnati, The White Shadow, Friends and Lovers, St. Elsewhere, Newhart, and Hill Street Blues, and was later sold to Television South, an ITV Franchise holder in 1988. The MTM logo resembles the Metro Goldwyn Mayer logo, but includes a cat named Mimsie instead of a lion. Currently, the shows of MTM Enterprises are distributed by 20th Century-Fox, which is owned by The Walt Disney Company.

== Personal life ==
=== Relationships and family ===
Moore had a difficult relationship with her parents, and by her own choice, spent long periods of her adolescence being raised by her grandmother and an aunt.

“My problems with my parents were basically communications problems ... I believe they did the best they could at the time in raising me. I didn’t see it, and I wanted to live elsewhere. Sure, I think I was being a rotten kid, but there were parts of what they did in raising me that were a little rotten, too.”

At age 18 in 1955, Moore married her next-door neighbor, 28-year-old cranberry juice salesman Richard Meeker. Within six weeks she was pregnant with her only child, Richard Carleton Meeker Jr., born on July 3, 1956. Meeker and Moore divorced in 1962. Later that year, Moore married Grant Tinker, a CBS executive and later chairman of NBC, and in 1969 they formed the television production company MTM Enterprises, which created and produced the company's first television series, The Mary Tyler Moore Show. The two broke up temporarily in 1973; around the same time, son Richie, then 17, moved out of his mother's house and into his father's. Moore and her son would be largely estranged for the next several years. Moore and Tinker got back together later in 1973, but announced a permanent separation in 1979 and divorced two years later.

Moore had re-established contact with her son, Richard, by mid-1980. However, on October 14, 1980, Richard died of an accidental gunshot to the head while handling a small, .410 shotgun. He was 24 years old. The same model shotgun was later taken off the market because of its "hair trigger". Three and a half weeks earlier, Ordinary People had been released, in which Moore played a mother who was grieving over the accidental death of her son.

In the early 1980s, Moore dated first Steve Martin and later Warren Beatty. Another relationship, with Michael Lindsay-Hogg, ended when she wanted to be exclusive and he did not.

A 47-year-old Moore married 29-year-old cardiologist Robert Levine on November 23, 1983, at the Pierre Hotel in New York. They met in 1982, when he treated Moore's mother in New York on a weekend house call; Moore and her mother had just returned from a visit to Vatican City, where they'd had a personal audience with Pope John Paul II. Moore and Levine remained married for 34 years, until her death in 2017.

=== Political beliefs ===
During the 1960s and 1970s, Moore had a reputation as a liberal or moderate, although she endorsed President Richard Nixon for re-election in 1972. She endorsed President Jimmy Carter for re-election in a 1980 campaign television ad. In 2011, her friend and former co-star Ed Asner said during an interview on The O'Reilly Factor that Moore "has become much more conservative of late"; Bill O'Reilly, host of that program, stated that Moore had been a viewer of his show and that her political views had leaned conservative in recent years. In a Parade magazine article from March 22, 2009, Moore identified herself as a libertarian centrist who watched Fox News. She stated: "when one looks at what's happened to television, there are so few shows that interest me. I do watch a lot of Fox News. I like Charles Krauthammer and Bill O'Reilly... If McCain had asked me to campaign for him, I would have."

In an interview for the 2013 PBS series Pioneers of Television, Moore said that she was recruited to join the feminist movement of the 1970s by Gloria Steinem, but did not agree with Steinem's views. Moore said she believed that women have an important role in raising children and that she did not believe in Steinem's view that all women owe it to themselves to have a career.

=== Health issues ===
Moore was diagnosed with type 1 diabetes in 1969 at age 33, shortly after having suffered a miscarriage. Her diagnosis came after a routine blood test showed her blood glucose level was 750 mg/dL (41.7 mmol/L), nearly ten times the healthy range. Moore had attributed some of her symptoms, such as fatigue and excessive thirst, to her pregnancy. She stated that the doctors treating her "did not know how I was still alive and walking around. But within 48 hours, I was brought back to normal, and then began the hard part—living with the disease." She was initially prescribed Orinase, an oral medication usually prescribed for type 2 diabetes, before beginning an insulin regimen. Moore initially kept her diagnosis a secret, but later announced it to the public:

It wasn’t that I thought it was a stigma. It was that I was afraid that as an actress, when people watched me, whether it was doing my series or doing a part in a movie, that people would say, ‘You know, she’s a diabetic.’ And the other person would say, ‘What’s that?’ ‘Well, I don’t know. But she has it.’ ‘Well, it doesn’t look like it’s too serious. I mean, look at her. There she is. She’s up there, prancing around,’ or ‘Oh my God, that poor woman,’ you know? So I just thought all of that would get in the way of my work. And eventually I just let go of it and said, do what you know is the right thing to do. And I did. And I’m glad.

Moore was an alcoholic much of her life but quit drinking in 1984 after admitting herself into the Betty Ford Center. One year after getting sober, she quit her three-pack-a-day cigarette habit.

In 2011, she had surgery to remove a meningioma, a benign brain tumor. In 2014, friends reported that Moore had heart and kidney problems, and was nearly blind from complications related to diabetes.

== Philanthropy ==
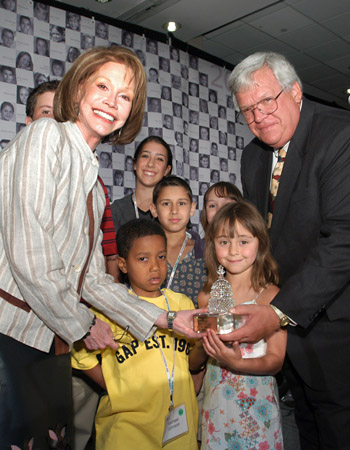
Moore presents the JDRF's Heroes Award to the U.S. Speaker of the House Dennis Hastert for his role in securing federal funding for type 1 diabetes research in 2003

In addition to her acting work, Moore was the International Chairperson of JDRF (the Juvenile Diabetes Research Foundation). In this role, she used her celebrity status to help raise funds and awareness of diabetes mellitus type 1.

In 2007, in honor of Moore's dedication to the Foundation, JDRF created the "Forever Moore" research initiative which will support JDRF's Academic Research and Development and JDRF's Clinical Development Program. The program works on translating basic research advances into new treatments and technologies for those living with type 1 diabetes.

Moore advocated for animal rights for years and supported charities like the ASPCA and Farm Sanctuary. She helped raise awareness about factory farming methods and promoted more compassionate treatment of farm animals.

Moore appeared as herself in 1996 on an episode of the Ellen DeGeneres sitcom Ellen. The storyline of the episode includes Moore honoring Ellen for trying to save a 65-year-old lobster from being eaten at a seafood restaurant. She was also a co-founder of Broadway Barks, an annual animal adopt-a-thon held in New York City. Moore and friend Bernadette Peters worked to make it a no-kill city and to encourage adopting animals from shelters.

In honor of her father, George Tyler Moore, a lifelong American Civil War enthusiast, in 1995 Moore donated funds to acquire a historic structure in Shepherdstown, West Virginia, for Shepherd College (now Shepherd University) to be used as a center for Civil War studies. The center, named the George Tyler Moore Center for the Study of the Civil War, is housed in the historic Conrad Shindler House (c. 1795), which is named in honor of her great-great-great-grandfather, who owned the structure from 1815 to 1852.

Moore also contributed to the renovation of a historic house in Winchester, Virginia, that had been used as headquarters by Confederate Major General Thomas J. "Stonewall" Jackson during his Shenandoah Valley campaign in 1861–62. The house, now known as the Stonewall Jackson's Headquarters Museum, had been owned by Moore's great-grandfather, Lieutenant Colonel Lewis Tilghman Moore, commander of the 4th Virginia Infantry in Jackson's Stonewall Brigade.

== Death ==
Moore died on January 25, 2017, at Greenwich Hospital in Greenwich, Connecticut, aged 80, from cardiopulmonary arrest complicated by pneumonia after having been placed on a ventilator the week before. She was buried in Oak Lawn Cemetery in Fairfield, Connecticut, in a private ceremony.

== Acting credits and accolades ==
A statue, designed by Gwen Gillen, at Nicollet Mall in Minneapolis replicates the tam o' shanter-tossing image that opened The Mary Tyler Moore Show.

In February 1981, Moore was nominated for the Academy Award for Best Actress for her role in the drama film Ordinary People but lost to Sissy Spacek for her role in Coal Miner's Daughter. In 1981, she won the Golden Globe Award for Best Actress in a Drama for that role.

Moore received a total of six Emmy Awards, including two for her portrayal of Laura Petrie on The Dick Van Dyke Show and three for portraying Mary Richards on The Mary Tyler Moore Show. In 1993 she won an Emmy for her portrayal of Georgia Tann in the Lifetime made-for-TV film Stolen Babies.

On Broadway, Moore received a Special Tony Award for her performance in Whose Life Is It Anyway? in 1980, and was nominated for a Drama Desk Award as well. In addition, as a producer, she received nominations for Tony Awards and Drama Desk Awards for MTM's productions of Noises Off in 1984 and Benefactors in 1986, and won a Tony Award for Best Revival of a Play or Musical in 1985 for Joe Egg. In 1986, she was inducted into the Television Hall of Fame. In 1987, she received a Lifetime Achievement Award in Comedy from the American Comedy Awards.

Moore's contributions to the television industry were recognized in 1992 with a star on the Hollywood Walk of Fame. The star is located at 7021 Hollywood Boulevard.

On May 8, 2002, Moore was present when cable network TV Land and the City of Minneapolis dedicated a statue in downtown Minneapolis of Mary Richards, her character in The Mary Tyler Moore Show. The statue, by artist Gwendolyn Gillen, was chosen from designs submitted by 21 sculptors. The bronze sculpture was located in front of the Dayton's department store, later Macy's, near the corner of 7th Street South and Nicollet Mall. It depicts the iconic moment in the show's opening credits where Moore tosses her tam o' shanter in the air, in a freeze-frame at the end of the montage. While Dayton's is clearly seen in the opening sequence, the store in the background of the hat toss is actually Donaldson's, which was, like Dayton's, a locally based department store with a long history at 7th and Nicollet. In late 2015, the statue was relocated to the city's visitor center during renovations, and was reinstalled in its original location in 2017.

Moore was awarded the 2011 Screen Actors Guild's lifetime achievement award. In New York City in 2012, Moore and Bernadette Peters were honored by the Ride of Fame and a double-decker bus was dedicated to them and their charity work on behalf of "Broadway Barks", which the duo co-founded.

== Sources ==
- Carrigan, Henry C. Jr. (2013). "Mary Tyler Moore (1936– )". In Sickels, Robert C. (ed.). 100 Entertainers Who Changed America: An Encyclopedia of Pop Culture Luminaries: An Encyclopedia of Pop Culture Luminaries. Santa Barbara, California: ABC-CLIO. ISBN 978-1-598-84831-1.
- Kohen, Yael (2012). We Killed: The Rise of Women in American Comedy. New York City, New York: Macmillan. ISBN 978-0-374-28723-8.
- Moore, Mary Tyler (1995). After All. Putnam. ISBN 0399140913.
- Moore, Mary Tyler (2009). Growing Up Again: Life, Loves, and Oh Yeah, Diabetes. St. Martin's Press. ISBN 9780312376314.
