= Don't Make Me Laugh =

Don't Make Me Laugh may refer to:

- "Don't Make Me Laugh", a song by Gomez from the 2006 album How We Operate
- Don't Make Me Laugh, a trilogy of one-act plays performed by Gene Wilder at the Westport Country Playhouse in 2001
- Don't Make Me Laugh, a two-series stand-up comedy show on BBC Radio 4, hosted by David Baddiel from 2014 to 2016
