= Post Mortem (Gurney play) =

Play written by A. R. Gurney

- Original language: English
- Written by: A. R. Gurney
- Characters: Dexter; Alice; Betsy
- Genre: Drama

Premiere
- Date: November 2, 2006
- Place: The Flea Theater, New York City, New York

Post Mortem is a two-act play written by late–20th–century/early–21st–century playwright A. R. Gurney. It was first produced on stage in New York City in November 2006.

== Summary ==
The story is set in a near-future where the United States is ruled by the Christian Right political movement at the start of the play.

In Act One, set in the year 2015, Dexter, a graduate student at a "faith-based" Midwestern university, proposes the subject of his thesis to Alice, his professor — he has discovered a manuscript of an unknown play titled Post Mortem, written by a "minor late–20th/early–21st century playwright", A. R. Gurney. The content of the play is explosive, and could ignite major change in the country. Alice is worried about the government finding out via listening devices that may have been installed in her office. Dexter makes romantic advances on Alice, who rejects him. Alice reveals youthful dreams of becoming an actress, such hopes having been dashed by the government's conversion of all Broadway theaters to casinos in order to raise money for the enormous sums spent over the years on the continuing war in Iraq. Alice becomes convinced it is vitally important to stage this play, but the university administration thwarted her initial proposals to stage the play on-campus.. Act I ends with the destruction of the script by the government.

Though the play has no intermission, there is a transition between the acts, when the actress playing Betsy in Act Two comes onstage (in character as a university student, and still within the play's confines, in that she is there to introduce the seminar that is the substance of Act Two). She gives what is traditionally known in the theater as the "cell-phone speech": a plea to the audience, usually before the first act begins, to turn off their cell-phones and other electronic devices so that there will be no distractions from the performance. However, Betsy's boilerplate request, besides being out-of-place, evolves beyond a simple request into a spirited extended monologue on the need for civility in a modern world, a world that not only ignores simple courtesy, but actually seems to encourage rudeness.

In Act Two, set in the year 2027, Dexter and Alice, now married, return to the university as prize-winning celebrities. They are interviewed by Betsy at a campus seminar about the glorious impact of their nationwide stagings of the now well-known play Post Mortem (which they have re-created from their own memories). The play has changed society completely, removing the Christian right from positions of political power, and achieving many liberal goals:

- An effective universal healthcare system
- World peace
- Smooth-running public transportation,
- Significant declines in global warming and in the divorce rate.

Dexter flirts with Betsy, to Alice's discomfort. Both Betsy and Alice wonder what will be the source of morality that had previously been supplied by religion. And despite all the significant changes wrought by the play, American society still remains entranced by television trivialities.

== Productions ==
- World Premiere (Off-Off-Broadway)

- The Flea Theater, New York, New York
- Opened November 2, 2006
- Closed December 16. 2006
- Cast

- Alice: Tina Benko
- Dexter: Christopher Kromer
- Betsy: Shannon Burkett

- Director: Jim Simpson

- Hudson Valley Premiere

- St. Andrews Church, New Paltz, New York
- Opened April 21, 2007 (one night only)
- Cast

- Alice: Elizabeth Barrows
- Dexter: Jack Kroll
- Betsy: Vivian Lambertson

- Director: Christine Crawfis

- West Coast Premiere

- Lyric Hyperion Theatre Café, Silverlake, California
- Opened January 11, 2008
- Closed February 17, 2008
- Cast

- Alice: Anna Nicholas
- Dexter: Alan Bruce Becker
- Betsy: Andrea Syglowski

- Director: Jered Barclay

- Midwest Premiere

- Black Box Theatre (LeFevre Hall), Ohio State University, Newark, Ohio
- Opened November 13, 2008
- Closed November 22, 2008
- Director: Dave Williams

== Critical reception ==
Most critics enjoyed the first act, but felt that the second act deteriorated into a lecture or a talk-show moment that explained what happened rather than showing the events.

- "The satire is no deeper than a Saturday Night Live sketch but at 80 minutes it wears out its welcome early."
- "There’s a kick or two in that premise, as Gurney good-naturedly pokes fun at himself and peppers the play’s first half with theatre in-jokes, but ultimately the play is only sporadically amusing."
- "On one level, “Post Mortem” isn’t much more than a grab bag of Broadway insider jokes, polemical satire and cosmic lamentation."

Another complaint was the absence of the play-within-the-play. Though much is made of that play's immense impact, there is no evidence of what that play actually says, proclaims, describes, or portrays that would produce such an effect.

== Publication ==
Post Mortem is published by Broadway Play Publishing Inc.
