= The Problem (play) =

One-act play written by A. R. Gurney

The Problem is a one-act play by A. R. Gurney. It was originally performed in 1968 in Boston by a theatre group Gurney helped to organize called "The Theatre For Now". The reception was quiet but the play later opened to enthusiastic reviews at a popular playhouse in London, England and went on to be broadcast on BBC. Like many of Gurney's other plays, The Problem concerns WASPs of the American northeast.

== Summary ==
The unnamed husband and wife do not share any feelings of love, closeness or even awareness. As the wife walks into the study of their home, she immediately reveals her hugely pregnant stomach to her husband who seems to not have noticed that she was ever pregnant. The Husband is completely unfazed and uninterested and almost leaves, until the Wife presents him with the possibility that the baby may not be his. The husband stays, remarkably and comically, calm . He only becomes slightly surprised when the Wife states that they have not had sex in five years; he does not realize it has been so long. While the Husband becomes apologetic for this lack of intimacy, the Wife assures him not to worry as she understands that his attention is always rightfully focused on his work. Without a care in the world they both over sympathize and let each other get away with anything and everything.

The Husband attempts to quickly resolve the situation by instructing his wife to bear the child and that he will consider it his own child, however, the problem becomes more complex when the Wife worries that the baby will turn out be from black descent. The Husband, always retaining his calm demeanor, quickly comes up with a scheme to make it look like an adoption. The Husband is more worried about the family's public image than the family itself. Unfortunately, the Wife rejects this idea as the real father may object to the adoption, explaining that he shall continue to come around after the birth once she is capable of sexual intercourse again.

If the manner of the characters weren't ridiculous enough, an even more absurd flip-flop of story and power begins to emerge. The Husband reveals that he has not been leaving the house at night to teach class, but to sneak down to the cellar and daub himself in dark makeup and apply a fake wig. He confesses to being her “Negro” lover and capitalizing on her sympathies she has towards “that unhappy race”; signifying the narrow-mindedness of the WASPs. However, this is only the beginning; the Wife confesses that she knew her new lover was actually her husband the entire time, as she had followed him into the cellar the very first night. The Husband reacts happily as he is excited that his wife actually enjoys his love making. Unfortunately, she goes on to explain that after the first night she found a similar looking woman and replaced herself with her every night he went to the cellar to change. She reasons the predicament of her pregnancy by explaining how she sought out countless real racially exotic patrons for the past five years. The husband becomes excited to experience the comforts of married love in the bedroom.

However, the Wife reiterates the issue of her pregnancy. The Husband responds by saying there is no problem at all. A surprise twist is revealed, showing that it was all just a psychological game.
