= Conrad Shindler House =

Historic building in West Virginia, US

Coordinates: 39°25′50.4″N 77°48′20.7″W

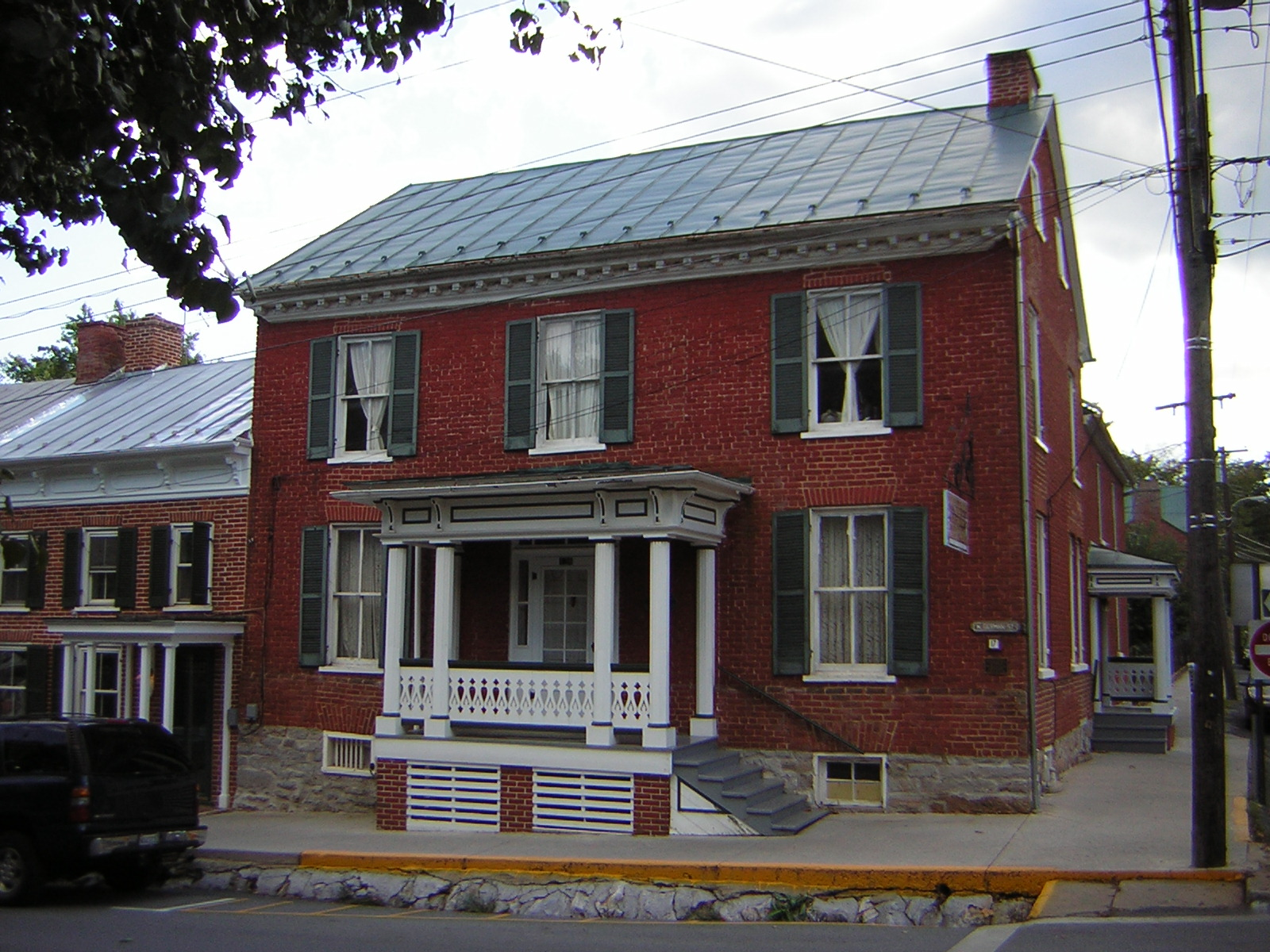
Conrad Shindler House

The Conrad Shindler House is a historic building, now home to the George Tyler Moore Center for the Study of the Civil War, in Shepherdstown, West Virginia.

== History of the house and property ==
Located at 136 West German Street, in Shepherdstown, West Virginia, the Conrad Shindler House, circa 1795, is likely the second house to have been constructed on Lot 17, as the first recorded deed of sale between Thomas Shepherd and George Burket stipulated that to maintain ownership of the property, "[the owner] must build or erect or cause to be built or erected … one good dwelling house twenty feet long and sixteen feet wide with a stone or brick chimney…" So, as the first owner, George Burket (who retained ownership until 1773) likely built a small log structure with a stone or brick chimney at the corner of Princess and German streets. George and his wife Barbary Burket were therefore likely the first European occupants of a structure at Lot 17. Presumably this original structure was torn down and replaced by subsequent owners with the current structure dating to 1795.

Michael Fouke purchased the property and its improvements in 1773 for £22 and held it through the American Revolution and into the early nineteenth century when he sold his claim to his sons and daughters. Fouke is known to have practiced carpentry in the Shepherdstown area in the late eighteenth and early nineteenth century which could indicate he was responsible for the construction of the circa 1795 structure. Beyond his role as a carpenter, little has been recorded of his life, yet one account puts Fouke at the launch of James Rumsey’s steam-powered boat on the Potomac River in 1787 where he exclaimed, "Why, sir, she could navigate through the Strait of Gibraltar."

Michael Fouke sold his ownership of the lot and its improvements to his children in 1810, but it is reasonable to assume he maintained residence in Shepherdstown with his children as they later preserved a life estate for him. With the vested interests in the home, George, Charles, John, Frederick, Michael, Christian, Phillip, and Elizabeth decided to sell their claims to the property to Conrad Shindler. One deed on November 29, 1813 retained the aforementioned life estate for George's father, Michael Fouke Sr. This insured a home would be provided for the remainder of the elder Fouke's life.

On April 17, 1815, Conrad Shindler gained full ownership of the property when he made a final purchase of claims on Lot 17 from John Fouke for $70. Incidentally, out of the original group of Michael Fouke's children who purchased the property in 1810, Charles and Phillip never sold their portion of the property, likely due to their death or some other calamity. Nonetheless, by April 1815, Conrad Shindler, a coppersmith and the son of a German immigrant, was the rightful owner of Lot 17 for the combined sum of $530.

Conrad Shindler's association with the building lasted officially from 1815 until May 8, 1852 when he died of natural causes.

== Conrad Shindler ==
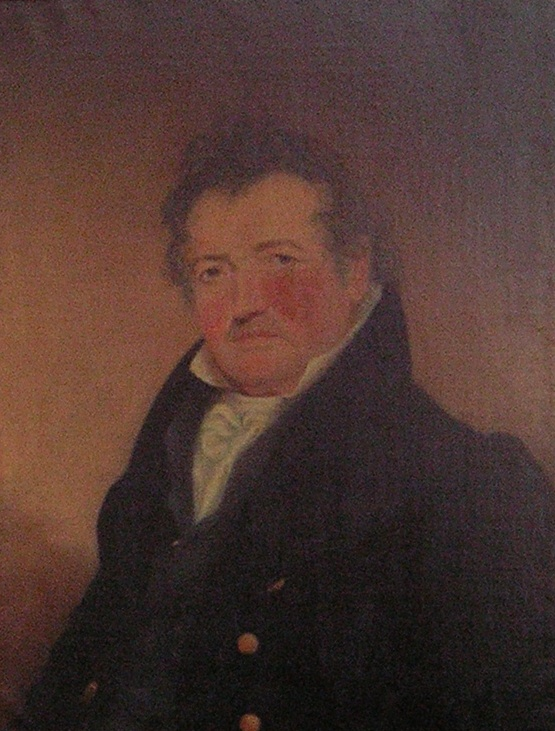
Conrad Shindler 1840

Conrad Shindler was born in 1778, the son of Georg Conrad Shindler Sr. of York, Pennsylvania who was a Revolutionary War veteran of the York County Militia. His father made the trip from York County to Berkeley County, Virginia in the early part of the 19th century to settle in the region. Less than a decade later, Conrad Jr. purchased property in Shepherdstown on April 27, 1801, identified as Lot 3.

Shindler was a coppersmith, working at a yet undocumented forge in the rear of Lot 17. An original Shindler copper kettle is on display at the Historic Shepherdstown Museum in the Entler Hotel.

From the 1815 Jefferson County Personal Property Tax lists it is evident that Shindler owned slaves from the outset of his stay at Lot 17. By 1835 these tax records show Shindler owning three slaves of unmentioned value or sex. By his death in 1852, a full assessment of his personal property was performed in accordance with his last will and testament. The assessment shows that Shindler owned seven slaves of varying ages and sex. Whether or not these slaves occupied the building at Lot 17 is not known; Shindler also owned two tracts of farming land outside town where they may have lived and worked.

After Shindler died, his property passed to his wife, Elizabeth Shindler, who is recorded in the 1869 Census as a 78-year-old woman living with her eldest son, John. When Mrs. Shindler died in 1869 her property passed to Conrad Shindler's heirs: John C. Shindler, George L. Shindler, Mary E. Bragonier, R.D. and Mary Shindler (of Nacogdoches, Texas), N.F. Hebb, and Eliza Hebb (of Sharpsburg, Maryland). These heirs sold their ownership of the property on October 28, 1869 to the "Trustees of the Reformed Church of Shepherdstown." This transaction and sale was never advertised in any local newspaper, and it is assumed that since Shindler's heir Mary E. Bragonier was married to the minister of this church this deal was in the works before Mrs. Shindler's death.

== Recent history ==
Under the auspices of the Reformed Church of Shepherdstown, later known as Christ Reformed Church, the property was used as a parsonage and, in subsequent years, for tenant dwelling. The property was owned by Christ Reformed Church until 1995 when it was placed on the market for sale by its trustees. Actress Mary Tyler Moore, a descendant of Conrad Shindler, purchased the property to create a permanent home for a Civil War Center to be operated by Shepherd College.

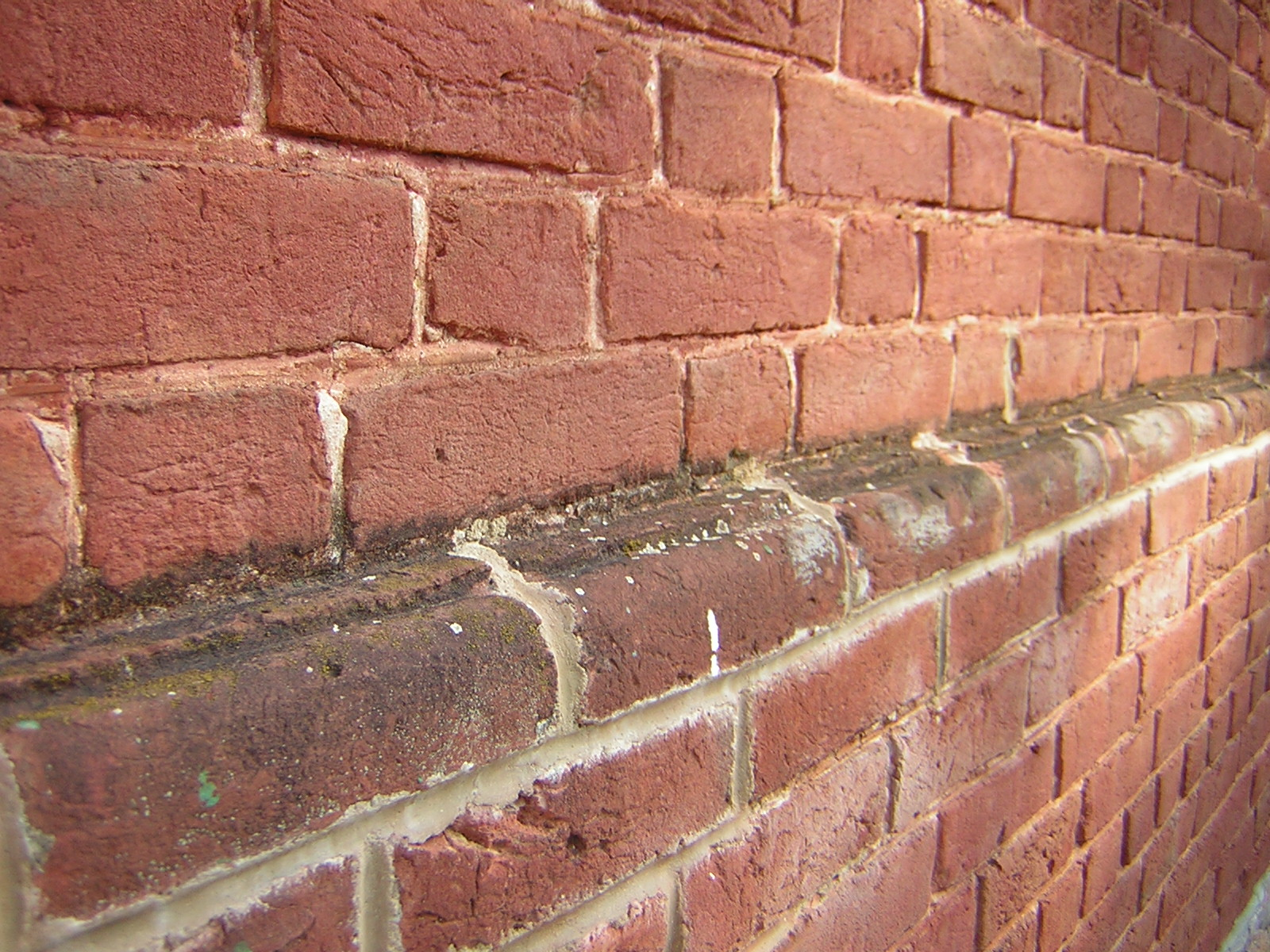
Historic Flemish Bond and Water Table at the Shindler House (ca. 1795)
