= George Tyler Moore Center for the Study of the Civil War =

Research center at Shepherd University

The George Tyler Moore Center for the Study of the Civil War, in Shepherdstown, West Virginia, is a Civil War research center at Shepherd University.

The center hosts the university's Civil War and 19th-century America concentrated track of studies. Courses in the concentration cover the American Civil War, 1850–1865; the Reconstruction Era; African-American History; Soldiers and Society, 1861–65; and the Old South. Students are expected to conduct primary research within the topic area, and to become an intern at one of various historic sites in the region, such as Harpers Ferry National Historical Park.

== History ==
The idea to create a "Center for the Study of the Civil War" at Shepherd University came as a result of 1990 discussions between officials from the university and Antietam National Battlefield. The role of the center was envisioned as a "keeper of the standards" for the National Park Service's (NPS) "Civil War Soldiers System" (CWSS) database that was to be developed. The CWSS consists of several fields of basic data taken from index cards that are keyed to a soldier's service records kept at the National Archives.

In August 1991, a Civil War Soldiers Database Planning Conference was held. Participants included Park Service personnel, Shepherd University staff and faculty, and noted Civil War scholars. The conference attendees concluded that Shepherd could enhance the NPS project by overseeing the academic integrity of database enhancements and assuring that proper data standards are maintained. It also was suggested that Shepherd could initiate its efforts by demonstrating how a database subset (to the NPS database), such as West Virginia's Union soldiers, might be enhanced by including data gleaned from census records, pension files, and other sources.

A second conference was held at Shepherd in March 1993. A Scholars' Advisory Board had been named, and all board members were in attendance. Other conference attendees included NPS personnel, Shepherd staff and faculty, local and state educators, and interested citizens. It was generally agreed that the NPS database would not be of much use to scholarly historians; Shepherd should include information from the soldiers' "Compiled Service Records" and "Pension Files" in the National Archives. It was debated whether data from the 1860 and later censuses should be included; the consensus was priority should be placed on the service records and pension files. Finally, most of the conference attendees agreed that the educational function of the center would be as important as the database itself. A scholarly question-and-answer period followed, which was broadcast on C-SPAN.

=== Directors ===
In September 1993, Civil War historian Mark A. Snell, a retired Army officer and former assistant professor of history at West Point, was hired; he began his duties in November 1993, soon after his retirement from the United States Army. He has a B.A. from York College of Pennsylvania, an M.A. in American history from Rutgers, and the Ph.D. from the University of Missouri-Kansas City. Snell is a former assistant professor at the United States Military Academy, West Point, NY.

He has written or edited several books on the Civil War, including From First to Last, The Life of Major General William B. Franklin (Fordham Univ. Press, 2002).

In August 2015, Dr. James J. Broomall was named director of the George Tyler Moore Center for the Study of the Civil War. Dr. Broomall received his B.A. from the University of Delaware as a History and American History major in January 2001. He then earned his M.A. in History and Museum Studies at the University of North Carolina, Greensboro in May 2006. Dr. Broomall received his Ph.D. in history from the University of Florida in December 2011.

Prior to assuming the directorship at the Civil War Center as well as the position of assistant professor in the Shepherd University History Department, Dr. Broomall served as a visiting assistant professor in the History Department at Virginia Tech from 2010 to 2011. In 2011, Dr. Broomall was hired as a visiting assistant professor at the University of North Florida, and from 2012 until 2015 he served as an assistant professor in the History Department at the University of North Florida.

Dr. Broomall has published and edited several books and studies including Rethinking American Emancipation: Legacies of Slavery and the Quest for Black Freedom (Cambridge University Press, 2016) which he co-edited with William A. Link; as well as "This Debatable Land": The Chesapeake and Ohio Canal's Civil War (manuscript-length report submitted to National Park Service and Organization of American Historians). Dr. Broomall has published over twelve articles and chapters and written over seven book reviews. He has received the Major Grant from the West Virginia Humanities Council in the summer of 2016; been nominated by UNF for an Undergraduate Teaching Award in the fall of 2014; awarded a Faculty Development Research Grant by UNF in the summer 2013; won the Milbauer Prize for Best Dissertation in the Department of History from University of North Florida in 2013; and been the recipient of nine other fellowships, grants, scholarships and awards.

Dr. Broomall currently serves on the advisory boards of the Shepherdstown Battlefield Preservation Association, the Save Historic Antietam Foundation, and Engaging the Civil War Series with the Southern Illinois University Press as well as serving as the Faculty Senate Representative for the Department of History at Shepherd University.

=== Programs and facilities ===
The center hosts an annual seminar series – The Civil War and American Society Seminar Series – that began c. 1996.

The center is concentrating on entering data only from the soldiers' service records; they begin entering data from the pension files at a later date. A group of dedicated volunteers has been entering data for smaller projects, such as collecting information from the service records of West Virginia Civil War soldiers buried in our national cemeteries. Volunteers have completed Antietam, Gettysburg, and Andersonville national cemeteries.

The center developed an interactive educational software program about West Virginia's role in the Civil War. Funded in part by a grant from the West Virginia Humanities Council, the program (for CD-ROM) was issued free of charge to public secondary schools in West Virginia in 2009.

The center hosts numerous Civil War-related programs throughout the year including Civil War Christmas, brown bag lunches, and various events in conjunction with regional National Parks and museums.

== The Conrad Shindler House ==
In September 1995, actress Mary Tyler Moore donated the Conrad Shindler House to the center. This house, erected around 1795, was owned by Moore's great-great-great-grandfather during the first half of the nineteenth century. During the Battle of Antietam in September 1862, the Shindler House, like most of the other buildings in Shepherdstown, received wounded Confederate soldiers. All operations of the Civil War Center relocated to the Shindler House in April 1996. In honor of Moore's father, the center was renamed The George Tyler Moore Center for the Study of the Civil War.

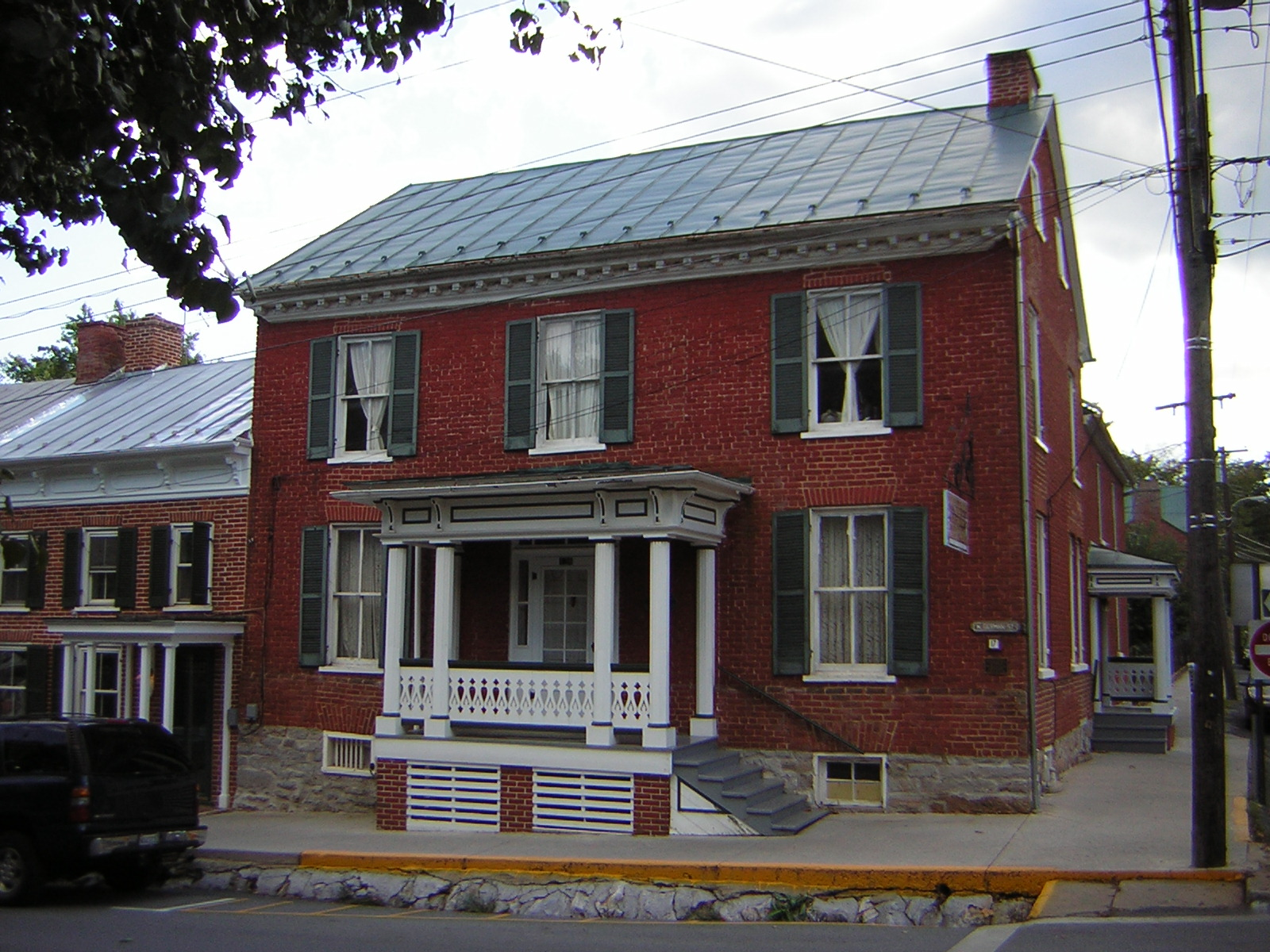
Conrad Shindler House today

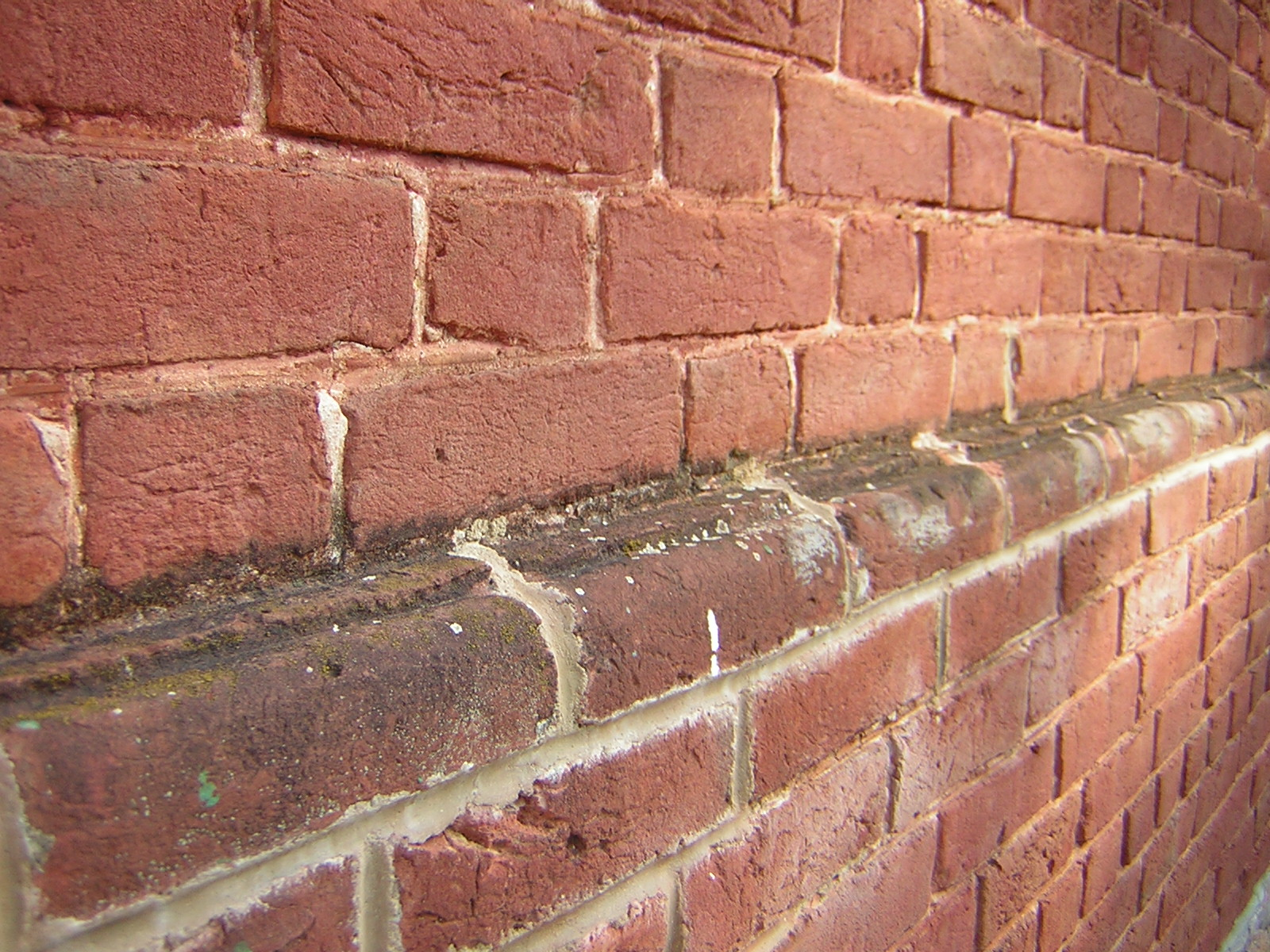
Historic Flemish Bond and Water Table at the Shindler House (ca. 1795)

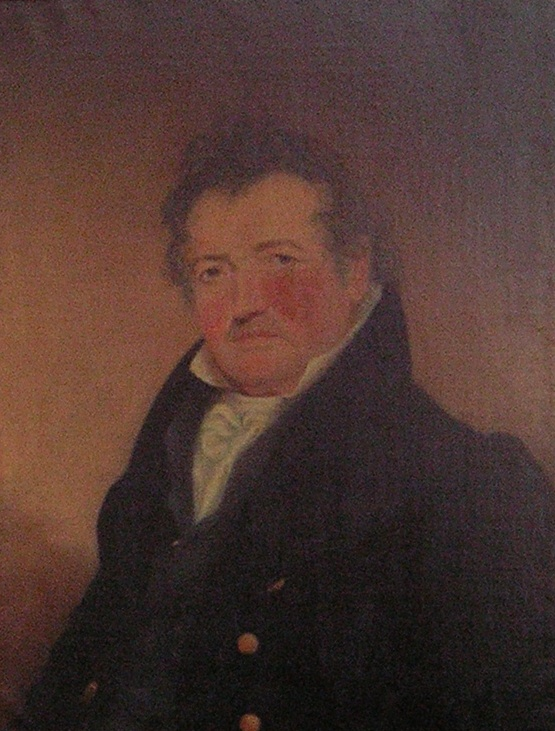
Conrad Shindler (ca. 1840)

== Research mission ==
The ongoing research at The George Tyler Moore Center for the Study of the Civil War involves the compilation of figures from the soldiers' compiled military service records which will lead to a more definitive number of veterans born in West Virginia. Within the next five years, data gleaned from the service records of soldiers serving in all of West Virginia's Union regiments and (Western) Virginia Confederate regiments will be compiled in the center's electronic database. Once completed, a simple query will be able to provide a very accurate total for both sides including data heretofore unavailable.

== Reference library ==
The center maintains its own non-lending library with over 3,000 titles. The materials are cataloged in the Shepherd University library system.

== Civil War seminars and lectures ==
Every year the center offers a weekend-long seminar with a topic of interest related to the Civil War era. Civil War scholars, enthusiasts, and college students alike attend the educational event and are offered a glimpse into cutting-edge research in Civil War history.
