= Judy GeBauer =

American playwright

- Born: Long Beach, California, U.S.
- Education: San Francisco State University (BA); University of Iowa (MFA)

Judy GeBauer is an American playwright.

== About ==
Born in Long Beach, CA, she grew up in the Bay Area and spent several years abroad. Her love for acting and writing began early. By third grade, she had written several neighborhood plays and she was appearing in children's theatre productions, playing the Queen of Hearts, a spider, a clown, and a toy soldier. She moved with her family to Denmark during her junior high years and attended an international school and a private girls school in Copenhagen. With her mother and brother she traveled through Europe, the Middle East and Asia before returning to California.

As an undergraduate at San Francisco State University, she appeared as Emilia in Othello and Mary Warren in The Crucible, among other roles. After graduation, she appeared as Octavia in Antony and Cleopatra at Marin Shakespeare Festival, in productions of Twelfth Night (Viola), King Lear, Richard III (Jane Shore), and A Midsummer Night's Dream (Mustardseed) at California Shakespeare Festival. She toured for two years with the National Shakespeare Company out of New York, during which time she played Kate in She Stoops to Conquer, Jocasta in Oedipus Rex, Beatrice in Much Ado About Nothing, Olivia in Twelfth Night, and Lady Capulet in Romeo and Juliet.

While living in New York, she returned to her early love, playwriting. Her plays Seconds, Bobby Sands MP, Reclaimed, and Mrs. Plenty Horses have been presented at the O’Neill Playwrights Conference. Her play about HUAC and education, Every Secret Thing, premiered at Modern Muse Theatre in Denver. Bobby Sands MP premiered at Philadelphia Festival Theatre for New Plays and went on to a New York production at Irish Arts. The Hidden Ones premiered at Philadelphia Festival Theatre. She is published by Broadway Play Publishing Inc., Playscripts, Inc., and Heinemann Books, and in Dramatics Magazine. She is married to Broadway dancer Gene GeBauer. She holds an MFA in playwriting from the University of Iowa Playwrights Workshop.

== Education ==
Skyline High School, Oakland, CA

San Francisco State University, B.A.

American Conservatory Theater Summer Congress

University of Iowa, MFA

== Affiliations ==
Dramatists Guild

PEN West U.S.A.

Actors Equity Assoc.

Rocky Mountain Women's Institute

== Publications ==
Playscripts, Inc.

Reclaimed

The Secret Earth

A Young Housewife

A Holmes Family Christmas

Good Night, Valsetz

Tricker Treat

Broadway Play Publishing Inc.

Facing Forward: The Nip and the Bite

Every Secret Thing

Heinemann Books

Baseball Monologues: a catcher to his pitcher

Elvis Monologues: A Pair of Eyes

On the Road: Advice to the Ingénue

On the Road: Someday there’ll be roads

Dramatics Magazine

Reclaimed

Doctor Chekhov Makes A House Call

== Awards and honors ==
HBO Writer Award

Dennis McIntyre Playwriting Award

Innovation Award, Colorado Federation for the Arts

W. Alton Jones Foundation grant

Steinberg Charitable Trust grant

Beverly Hills Theatre Guild-Julie Harris Award

Denver Post Ovation Award

Playwrights Unit (Denver Center Theatre Company)
