= Sweet Sue (play) =

Play written by A. R. Gurney

Sweet Sue is a play by A. R. Gurney. It premiered at the Williamstown Theatre Festival and later enjoyed a Broadway production at the Music Box Theatre during the 1986-87 season.

== Characters ==
The play requires four actors for its two characters, Susan Weatherhill, a repressed and uncertain woman in her late forties, and Jake, a young man who is the college roommate of Susan's son. Each of these characters is played simultaneously by two actors, who give expression to the characters' internal tensions and ambivalence. The script refers to them as: "Susan", "Susan Too", "Jake", and "Jake Too". This technique of dividing a single character between two actors is not unique to Sweet Sue; it can also be found in Overtones (1913 and 1929) by Alice Gerstenberg, Getting Out (1979) by Marsha Norman, and Passion (1981) by Peter Nichols. Here, Gurney uses it to create an atmosphere of light romantic comedy, punctuated by moments of unease.

== Analysis ==
Gurney has explained that the play was initially meant to be a modern treatment of the classical tale of Phaedra and her desire for a younger man, but turned into a summer romance, with Susan's struggling with problems of self-esteem, artistic integrity, and sexual attraction to a man young enough to be her son. Reviewers tended to dismiss the play as superficial and far from Gurney's best, but it ran for six months on Broadway, due in part to the casting of the two Sues with the popular actors Mary Tyler Moore and Lynn Redgrave.
