= Another Antigone =

Play written by A. R. Gurney

Another Antigone is a play by A. R. Gurney. It was first produced in March 1987 at the Old Globe Theatre in San Diego, California. The play opened at Playwrights Horizons in New York City in January, 1988. It is dedicated by the playwright to John Tillinger. It was published by the Dramatists Play Service in January 1988. The play is based on the Greek tragedy, Antigone by Sophocles, which is a classic tale of how unbending hubris destroys all who fall prey to its spell. Another Antigone is the same story, with some modern twists.

== Summary ==
Judy Miller, a gifted Jewish college senior, presents a short play to her Greek Theater professor, Henry Harper. Judy submits an updated, anti-nuclear version of Antigone in place of the formal paper that Harper has assigned to her. Harper is adamant in his refusal to accept her paper and threatens to fail her (and hence keep her from graduating) if she doesn't provide a more traditional paper. A battle of wills ensues, as both of them refuse to budge from their convictions. She produces her play on campus, as tensions continue to mount. Judy also lodges a complaint with the university grievance committee, which elicits a visit from the dean not only to plead with Harper to soften his stand, but also to warn him that accusations of anti-Semitism (however unfounded) have arisen. The play ends with the Professor, like Creon of Sophocles' Antigone, cast out from his home and left to wander, while Judy's fate is unknown, except that her life's dreams and goals have been so challenged that its anyones guess if the "old" Judy even exists anymore.
