= Sherry Kramer =

American playwright

- Born: Springfield, Missouri, U.S.
- Education: Wellesley College (BA); University of Iowa (MFA)

Sherry Kramer is an American playwright, born in Springfield, Missouri. Kramer attended Wellesley College and earned an MFA Fiction from the Iowa Writers Workshop and an MFA Playwriting from the Iowa Playwrights Workshop at the University of Iowa. Prior to her retirement, she taught playwriting at Bennington College.

== Works ==
Plays published by Broadway Play Publishing Inc.:

- When Something Wonderful Ends (first produced Humana Festival, Louisville, KY)
- David's Red Haired Death (first produced Woolly Mammoth Theatre, Washington, D.C.)
- Things That Break (first produced The Theatre of the First Amendment, Fairfax, VA)
- The Wall of Water (first produced Yale Repertory Theatre, New Haven, CT)
- What a Man Weighs (first produced Second Stage Theater, New York, NY)
- The World At Absolute Zero (first produced Ensemble Studio Theatre One Act Festival, New York, NY)
- A Permanent Signal (first produced Attica Productions, Edinburgh Fringe Theatre Festival)
- Partial Objects (first produced Mill Mountain Theatre, Roanoke, VA)
- The Release of a Life Performance (first produced Brass Tacks Theatre, Mlps, MN)
- About Spontaneous Combustion (first produced Brass Tacks Theatre, Mlps, MN)

Other plays:

- How Water Behaves (first produced at Capital Repertory Theatre in Albany, NY)
- The Dream House
- Cake
- The Bay of Fundy: An Adaptation of One Line From the Mayor of Casterbridge
- The Mad Master (commissioned by A.S.K Theatre Projects)
- Hold For Three (a 10-minute play)
- The Long Arms of Jupiter (croquet performance piece)
- Before and After (first produced Iron Belly Muses, Austin, TX)
- Napoleon's China (collaboration with Ann Haskell and Rebecca Newton) (first produced Salt Lake Acting Company)
- The Ruling Passion (workshopped New Harmony Project and Playlabs)
- The Law Makes Evening Fall (workshopped Sundance Theatre Lab and the Wilma Theatre)
- Ivanhoe, America (a modern-day adaptation of the novel, set in Missouri during the Vietnam War) (workshopped Arkansas New Play Festival at TheatreSquared)
- The Master and Margarita (a collaboration with Margaret Pine) (a music theatre adaptation of the novel by Mikhail Bulgakov) (workshopped The O'Neill Music Theatre Conference and the Hall Prince Musical Theatre Workshop)
