= The Runner Stumbles =

- Theatrical poster
- Directed by: Stanley Kramer
- Written by: Milan Stitt
- Based on: Play by Milan Stitt
- Produced by: Stanley Kramer
- Starring: Dick Van Dyke; Kathleen Quinlan
- Cinematography: László Kovács
- Edited by: Pembroke J. Herring
- Music by: Ernest Gold
- Distributed by: 20th Century Fox
- Release date: November 16, 1979
- Running time: 109 minutes
- Country: United States
- Language: English
- Budget: $2.5 million

The Runner Stumbles is a 1979 American drama film directed and produced by Stanley Kramer, based on the Broadway play by Milan Stitt. The film was the last of Kramer's long and distinguished career. It stars Dick Van Dyke, Kathleen Quinlan, Maureen Stapleton, Tammy Grimes, Beau Bridges, and Ray Bolger. This is Kramer's final film before his retirement in 1980 and death in 2001.

== Plot ==
In 1911 at a Roman Catholic parish in the rural town of Isadore, Michigan, Sister Rita, a young nun, arrives at the parish to help run the church school. When the parish's two elderly nuns contract tuberculosis, Sister Rita is forced to move into the rectory that is home to Father Rivard, the parish priest. The close proximity between the two begins to set off gossip and suspicions, to the point that a monsignor from the diocese comes to give Father Rivard a talking-to. The gossip turns out to be correct, as the priest and the nun confess their love for each other. However, their declaration of emotion leads to tragedy.

== Historical basis ==
The original play and film are both inspired by the August 1907 murder of Sr. Mary Janina Mezek, a Polish-born nun of the Felician Sisters. In December 1918, Sister Janina's bones were re-exhumed from a shallow grave underneath the parish church in Isadore, Michigan. The former parish priest, Father Andrew Bieniawski, was rumored to be having an affair with Sr. Janina and of being the father of her unborn child. However, he was found to have an ironclad alibi of fishing on Lake Michigan. This, and his frantic attempts to find Sr. Janina for years after her disappearance, caused Fr. Bieniawski to be ruled out as a suspect. While being held at the jail in Leelanau County, Michigan, Fr. Bieniawski's elderly housekeeper, Stanislawa Lipczynska, confessed to having repeatedly bludgeoned Sr. Janina with a garden spade before burying her alive under the church. During her subsequent trial, numerous Isadore residents testified how Mrs. Lipczynska had referred to the Felician Sisters as "priest's wives" and "whores". Mrs. Lipczynska was convicted of first degree murder and sentenced to life imprisonment.

== Original play ==
Writing on the play began in 1965 and debuted in 1971; it finally appeared on Broadway in 1976.

The play received a well-reviewed remount by Retro Productions in 2011 which moved Off-Broadway in 2012.

== Reception ==
Janet Maslin, writing in The New York Times, complained: "The movie's ethics are...so hazy, and its attention to religion so perfunctory, that it almost seems as if this were a story about something else that had been transferred, as an afterthought, to a Church setting...Mr. Kramer treats the film's religious questions as afterthoughts, and too often achieves a dispirited, noncommittal tone."

Roger Ebert, writing in the Chicago Sun-Times, considered the film to be "a little silly", but added that "in its relentlessly old-fashioned way, The Runner Stumbles has a sort of dramatic persistence: It's not great, but it's there." Variety criticized the film for being "presented in such a way that, at times, it appears like the best of the old-fashioned 1940s tear jerkers complete with overly lush sound track."

The Runner Stumbles was not commercially successful and turned out to be Kramer's last film. It was released on VHS. Kino Lorber Studio Classics released the film on DVD and Blu-ray in May 2020.

== UK premiere (theatre) ==
On 21 October 2009, the play The Runner Stumbles made its UK Premiere at The Crescent Theatre in Birmingham. It was the first time the play had been performed outside of the United States. The play was presented by the Birmingham School of Acting Theatre Company and directed by Lise Olson with music by Andy Ingamells, lighting by Jo Dawson, sound by Charlie Horne and design by David Crisp. The play ran at The Crescent Theatre in the Ron Barber Studio until 24 October 2009.

The original UK cast:

- Father Rivard: Philip Duguid-Mcquillan
- Sister Rita: Jenny Palmer
- Mrs Shandig: Katie Salt
- Toby: Oliver Arnett
- Monsignor: Kevin Varty
- Prosecutor/Amos: Adrian Banks
- Erna/Louise: Joy Mcdermott

== Filming locations ==
The film was shot in the United States in Ellensburg, Washington (campus backdrop) and Roslyn, Washington, USA (where The Brick bar is shown as "The Bearded Nail").
