= On the Verge (play) =

Play written by Eric Overmyer

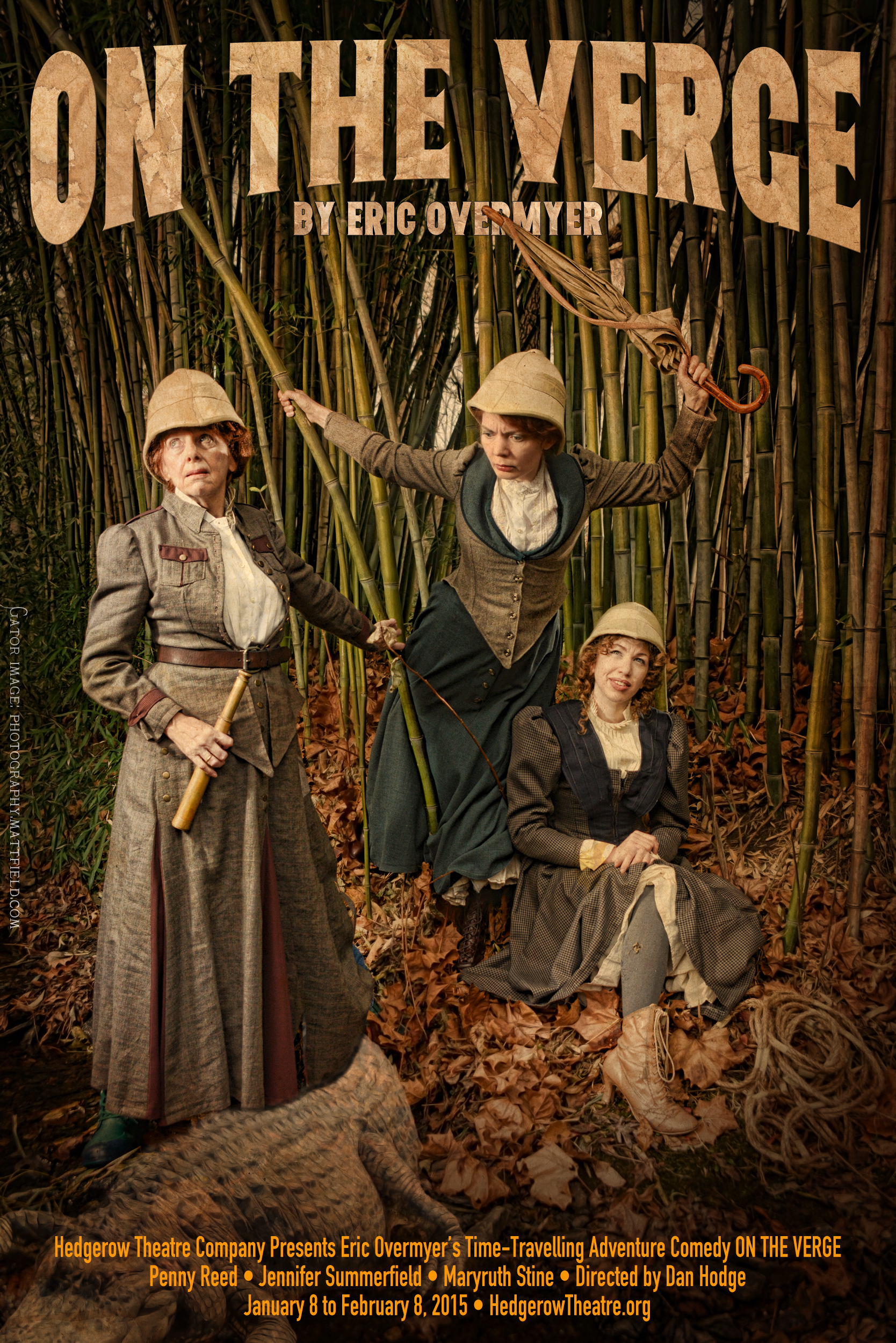
Poster of a 2015 production of On the Verge by the Hedgerow Theatre Company

On the Verge; or, The Geography of Yearning is a play written by Eric Overmyer. It premiered on 1985 at Baltimore's Center Stage. The original cast consisted of Libby Boone, Susan Barnes, Paddi Edwards, and James McDonnell. The script makes extensive use of esoteric language and pop culture references from the late nineteenth century to 1955. The cast consist of three lady explorers and eight diverse beings they encounter on their travels, which include different times as well as different locations. The aforementioned eight beings are intended to be played by a single actor. The play is published by Broadway Play Publishing Inc., and continues to be performed.

== Plot ==
The basic plot of the play follows the adventures of three Victorian women explorers into what they believe to be Terra Incognita, a new, unexplored land. The three are from very different exploration backgrounds but all exhibit their own form of independence. From the world in general and specifically men. The three together discuss many aspects of their pasts in exploring, with Mary and Fanny frequently trying to outdo each other. As the ladies progress on their travels it becomes apparent that they are not on an ordinary journey. Mary reaches the conclusion at the end of the first act that the three of them are in fact traveling forward through time and that, while doing so, they are beginning to absorb knowledge from the future. Alex dubs this phenomenon osmosing and from that point forward in the play, the ladies actively, and often fruitlessly try to osmose what the things they are encountering are, e.g. In the scene where Alex first encounters Cool Whip she takes several guesses at the item's identity: "(Osmoses) 'Mo hair'. No. 'Jello mold'. No. (Tastes) Noxzema! Yes! Heaven!"

== Characters ==
=== Mary ===
Often construed as the main lady explorer of the expedition, Mary Baltimore constantly cites her favorite periodical (the fictional newspaper The Boston Geo) as a source of wisdom. She remains unmarried, and considers exploration her unequivocal calling. Consequently, she shuns intimate relationships (although there are subtle hints that she is a lesbian). As a result, her pent-up sexual inclinations show themselves in her work, which tends to focus on the mating behaviors of the various peoples she encounters. Mary is the oldest member of the lady explorers' expedition. She is utterly devoted to studying and experiencing the future, both from an objective and subjective perspective. Her exploration "métier" is Africa.

=== Alex ===
Alexandra Cafuffle is the youngest of the group, and she allows her age to make up a considerable amount of her personality. She is typically forgetful, and tends to daydream. Upon encountering a new word (a frequent occurrence in their journey), she plays with it, trying to find rhymes and alternative meanings, to the endless irritation of her comrades. Alexandra is reasonably obsessed with Tibet and cites her adventures there often. She is rather inexperienced with jungles, the terrain that the ladies find themselves in upon reaching Terra Incognita, and curses the landscape to no end. Alexandra wishes to find the most enjoyable era for herself and settle down. Any new discovery enthralls her.

=== Fanny ===
Fanny Cranberry is the most conservative of the group in all aspects: socially, politically, and morally. She is the only married member of the group. While Fanny's relationship with her husband Grover is very obviously not one of head-over-heels love, the two have a very intimate relationship nonetheless. Fanny generally disapproves of everything she sees and hears in the future, finding it immoral. Some examples of this are her distaste for the music of the 1950s and the growing trend of women to wear trousers, something that she and Mary disagree with Alex on. Her sensual side is brought out in the second act and she gradually warms up to the future. Fanny counters Mary's Geo references with those of her tabloids, which she writes for and reads religiously. Fanny is the second oldest member of the expedition.

=== Grover et al. ===
The fact that one actor plays eight different characters is probably the "gimmick" of the show, an extra detail added by the author to make circumstances more interesting (There is a fifteen-second costume change at one point in the show). Almost no background is given for any of these characters, so the actor is able to take considerable artistic license with them. The nature of the characters themselves allow for more than enough over-the-top acting.

==== Alphonse ====
An enigmatic personality to many, Alphonse knows a smattering of German, has an accent to match, wears the uniform of a German pilot, yet is native to the jungle the ladies are navigating when they find him. The truth surfaces in their conversation at tea, when Alphonse reveals that he is not only a native, but also a cannibal. Alphonse was one of the people he devoured, but is apparently not sitting well, and his personality has been imprinted on the native's. He is fond of date bread, but not so much of tea. He becomes attracted to Fanny's wig during the scene, naturally making her feel uneasy. Mary treats him like a test subject, grilling him on his daily life, and Alex can't help but marvel at his accent.

==== Grover ====
The only character in the play with a direct connection to one of the women, Grover Cranberry is a shy banker from the American midwest who enters the play in one of his wife Fanny's dreams. Not much background is given on Grover in the script, leaving the actor to interpret his past and some personality traits. His obvious main shortcoming is his failure at self-assertion and individuality, deferring to Fanny on all decisions. It is hinted in his short dialogue that Grover may be an Alcoholic.

==== The Yeti ====
More comic relief than anything, the yeti has no lines except incoherent roaring, and indeed is only onstage for about two minutes. The ladies enjoy him immensely, even while he is trying to frighten them off with snowballs and guttural growls. Eventually he himself is frightened away by their advances.

==== The Gorge Troll ====
The Troll can be described as a perfect cross between Fonzie and a modern beat poet. For example:

What have we here but travelers three
Comin' cross the bridge to rap with me.
"In Xanadu" said Ka-u-ba-la Khan
Hey there, sweet things, what's going on?

Near the end of the play, Alex makes mention of a date she has with the Gorge Troll to write lyrics, alluding to the possibility of a romance between the two.

==== Mr. Coffee ====
Mr. Coffee is a gentlemen dressed in a fine white suit who talks to Fanny about her life and the demise of her husband. Fanny has previously "osmosed" the name Mr. Coffee in the play and describes to Mr. Coffee that she has had premonitions of meeting him. The scene that the two have together, while Alex and Mary are offstage, is an emotionally tense one in which Mr. Coffee reveals to Fanny Grover's decision to move on since his wife's disappearance to Terra Incognita in 1888. Mr. Coffee's description of his "one and only meeting" with Grover along with other comments he makes during the scene, identify him as the angel, or spirit, of death.

==== Madame Nhu ====
Madame Nhu is a psychic of sorts who appears on stage mysteriously in her palanquin. She gives the three ladies advice with her prophecies which are a string of fortune cookie and horoscope lines, most of them confusing and irrelevant e.g. "Praise your wife, even if it frightens her."

==== Gus ====
Gus's entrance is noted in the script as follows: "Gus, a fresh-faced American teenager, appears, wearing a baseball cap and chewing gum. Boundless energy." Gus gives the ladies clues as to their current location, revealing that they are in a town called Peligrosa in the year 1955. Gus also gives the ladies directions to Nicky's, the play's final location.

==== Nicky Paradise ====
Nicky Paradise is the owner of Nicky's Peligrosa Paradise Bar and Grill, a swinging vacation resort at which the play reaches its end. Nicky himself is a seductive lady-killer type of character who frequently bursts into song, popular songs from the era, in the middle of conversation with the three ladies. He takes an instant liking to Fanny, to whom he eventually proposes (offstage).

His relationship with Alex is one of business which forms based on his perception of her obvious talent in writing lyrics. He offers Alex a chance to use her talent making advertisements for Burma Shave, a company with whom he has just signed a contract.

Nicky and Mary can be described rather appropriately as rubbing each other the wrong way. Because the three women have grown rather close, Nicky and Mary are never hostile towards one another, although they are sometimes less than complimentary.
