= Children (Gurney play) =

Play by A. R. Gurney

Children is an early play by American playwright A. R. Gurney. It was first produced in London in 1974 and received its American premiere in 1976, directed by Keith Fowler and starring Carmen Mathews and Lynda Myles at the Virginia Museum Theater (now Leslie Cheek Theater) in Richmond. It was inspired by John Cheever's short story "Goodbye My Brother". A 2009 production starring Judith Light gave the play a new ending, and received positive reviews.

== Plot ==
Randy and Barbara, adult children of an affluent New England family, spend Fourth of July weekend at their family's beach house on an island off the coast of Massachusetts. Both are shocked when their widowed mother informs them that they're soon to be joined by their youngest brother, Pokey, long estranged from the family. When questioned as to the reasons for the reunion, their mother reveals that she plans to remarry—to their late father's best friend—and that, due to the conditions of their father's will, the house will pass to the three children. Pokey's arrival threatens the stability of this solid WASPish clan. Randy's childish competitiveness with his brother is reawakened. Pokey's liberated wife, Miriam, causes Randy's wife, Jane, to confront her true feelings about her life as a suburban wife and mother. Meanwhile, Barbara is having an affair with the family's former gardener, now married. Pokey announces his intentions to sell the house once it passes to the children, thus upsetting Barbara's plans for a quiet domestic life with her lover on the island. The children's upset forces their mother to confront where her life with her husband has brought her, and whether the true happiness really waits in her future.
