= What I Did Last Summer =

Play by A.R. Gurney

- Original language: English
- Written by: A.R. Gurney
- Characters: Charlie; Ted; Grace; Elsie; Bonny; Anna Trumbull
- Genre: Drama
- Setting: Lake Erie, 1945

Premiere
- Date: November 1981
- Place: USA

What I Did Last Summer is a play by the American playwright A.R. Gurney.

The setting is a well-to-do vacation colony on the shores of Lake Erie, the time 1945, during the final stages of World War II. Charlie, an incipiently rebellious fourteen-year-old, is summering with his mother and sister (his father is fighting in the Pacific) before going off to an expensive boarding school in the fall. Although he intended to spend the summer loafing and socializing with his friends (such as Ted), the need for spending money forces him to take a job as handyman for an iconoclastic, bohemian art teacher, Anna Trumbull, a former member of the "upper crust" who has lost both her fortune and her regard for the ideals of her upbringing. Sensing a kindred spirit in Charlie, she tries to stretch his mind by teaching him painting and sculpture - and exposing him to "radical" ideas about life and love that, in time, persuade Charlie to reject the notion of going back to school. The result is a family crisis and, more specifically, a showdown between Anna and Charlie's conservative mother, a clash of philosophies that raises as many questions as it answers and, in the end, stimulates the self-awareness that will shape the man Charlie is destined to become.

== Character descriptions ==
2M, 4W

Charlie - The lead character. He is a kind, naive 14-year-old, and the play is a story of him growing up. He struggles with trying to be his own person, pleasing his mother, and impressing his friends, and with Anna he is "growing to his full potential". He is artistic, and Ted is his best friend.

Anna Trumbull - A spiritual art teacher. She was once a mistress to a rich doctor. He would hide out with her in the country and bought her a country house to live in. She views life with a different view on the world than most do - sort of an early version of a hippie. She doesn't believe in laws or rules - that life shouldn't have strings tied to it. She has been an outcast basically her whole life.

Grace - Charlie's mother. She is home taking care of two children alone, while her husband is out fighting in the war. We find out that she used to be a student with Anna as well. A very good student, as Anna said. It is assumed that she is very similar to Charlie in the way that she believed in Anna's ways and fought/rebelled against her parents. In the end, she chose society over Anna's odd ways because she thought it was more proper and it was the rich thing to do. She struggles over forgetting her past, and trying to move forward with her life. She wants what is best for her children, especially Charlie, and thinks that Anna is corrupting him.

Elsie - 19 years old. Charlie's older sister. Since all of the boys her age are away at war, she is "depressed" with her life. She causes a great deal of stress on her mother. In a state of MAJOR teen angst, she is slightly overweight, and mentions it a few times throughout the show. Afraid to drive in the beginning of the show, she overcomes her fear at the end of the play.

Bonny - 14 years old. The annoying girl next door. She is always following Charlie and Ted around. She is described as quite nerdy and dorky, but in the end the audience sympathizes with when they realize that her father died of a heart attack at a young age and she has been following the boys around in hopes for a male figure in her life.

Ted - 16 years old. Cute, young Canadian boy. He is also in a stage of growing up, but is further along than Charlie. Struggles with being treated like a grown man when he is not quite ready for it. That being said, he is quite horny. Can drive. Works for a lawn mowing business. Sort of the "cool kid in town." He is older so he can drive and he can go on the roller coaster, that Charlie is too young to ride. At the end of the show, the audience finds out he is moving to Canada - for good. Although Charlie and Ted fight, the audience can feel the heart-wrenching moment between the two boys when Ted announces his move.

== Productions ==
In 1982, Barbara Feldon and Eileen Heckart starred in a touring production which included stops at the Westport Country Playhouse and Denver's Elitch Theatre.

The play was produced Off-Broadway at the Circle Repertory Company, running from February 6, 1983, to February 20, 1983. Directed by Joan Micklin Silver, the cast included Julie Bovasso as Anna Trumbul, Christine Estabrook as Elsie, and Robert Joy as Ted.

A professional revival was staged in Houston, Texas in 2003, directed by Kelley Williams. The Cast was as follows (2003): Charlie: (In alternating performances): Giddony Sanchez/ Shawn Anthony Anderson; Anna Trumbull: Sarah Douchez; Elsie: Jade Prudent; Grace: Elizabeth Keel; Bonny: Genieva Croley; Ted: John Ruiz.

What I Did Last Summer was also produced by Retro Productions in New York City at the Spoon Theater. This production was attended and praised by A.R. Gurney and his extended family, and directed by Ric Sechrest.

In 2015, a new production opened at Signature Theatre Company in New York City, with Noah Galvin in the role of Charlie, Kristine Nielsen as Anna Trumbull, Kate McGonigle as Elsie, Carolyn McCormick as Grace, Juliet Brett as Bonny, and Pico Alexander as Ted.
