= The Fourth Wall (Gurney play) =

Play by A.R. Gurney

The Fourth Wall is a 1992 play by the American playwright A. R. Gurney.

It was originally produced in the United States in regional theatre. During the course of the play, a quartet of characters deal with housewife Peggy's obsession with a blank wall in her house, slowly being drawn into a series of theatre clichés as the furniture and action on the stage become more and more directed to the supposed fourth wall.

== Synopsis ==
Peggy has redecorated the living room and her husband, Roger, cannot stand it. Peggy's usual exquisite taste was overcome by a mysterious lapse which caused her to redo the room as if it were a stage set. Everything faces one wall, the "fourth wall", which she has left bare and which is really the audience. Unable to cope any further, and needing someone to talk to, Roger asks their old, dear friend, Julia, to fly up from New York. Julia agrees that something strange is going on, especially since everyone who enters the room begins to behave as if they were acting in a play, or even a musical when occasionally someone feels the urge to sing a Cole Porter song. Julia, affected by the room, suggests Roger call "976-NUTS" and have Peggy put away, which would allow the two of them to have the affair they have never before thought about. Roger can't do that and explains that he's got one hope left: Floyd, a local theatre professor. Roger asks Floyd to come over in hopes that he can "doctor" Peggy's play and bring it to a close, thus allowing him and Peggy to resume their happily married life. But that doesn't work either as Floyd sees what's going on and is in complete agreement with Peggy. Peggy, following in St. Joan's footsteps at Floyd's urging, decides she must do what she must do and sets out to break the fourth wall in order to connect with her feelings. Roger rushes after her, leaving Julia and Floyd with a final Cole Porter tune.

== Sources ==
- Banham, Martin, ed. 1998. The Cambridge Guide to Theatre. Cambridge: Cambridge University Press. ISBN 0-521-43437-8.
- "Dramatists Play Service, Inc." Dramatists Play Service, Inc. N.p., n.d. Web. 2 May 2014.
