= Benefactors (play) =

- premiere programme
- Original language: English
- Written by: Michael Frayn
- Characters: Jane; Sheila; Colin; David
- Genre: Drama
- Setting: 1960s

Premiere
- Date: 1984
- Place: Vaudeville Theatre, London

Benefactors is a 1984 play by Michael Frayn. It is set in the 1960s and concerns an idealistic architect David and his wife Jane and their relationship with the cynical Colin and his wife Sheila. David is attempting to build some new homes to replace the slum housing of Basuto Road and is gradually forced by circumstances into building skyscrapers despite his initial aversion to these. This is set against the backdrop of 1960s new housing projects. Sheila becomes his secretary but it is unclear if she is helping him or the other way around. As the title of the play suggests it is about helping people and explores some of the difficulties inherent in this or in being helped.

== Awards and nominations ==
Awards

- 1984 Evening Standard Award for Best Play
- 1984 Laurence Olivier Award for Best New Play
- 1984 Plays and Players London Theatre Critics Award for Best Play
- 1986 New York Drama Critics' Circle Award for Best Foreign Play

Nominations

- 1986 Drama Desk Award for Best Play
- 1986 Tony Award for Best Play

Production Nominations

- 2011 New York Innovative Theatre Awards Outstanding Production of a Play, produced by Retro Productions
- 2011 New York Innovative Theatre Awards Outstanding Actress in a Lead, Kristen Vaughan (winner) Retro Productions
- 2011 New York Innovative Theatre Awards Outstanding Actress in a Lead, Heather E. Cunningham Retro Productions
- 2011 New York Innovative Theatre Awards Outstanding Ensemble, Heather E. Cunningham, David Ian Lee, Matthew Semler, and Kristen Vaughan Retro Productions

== Productions ==
A New York City revival opened on 3 November 2010, produced by the Off-Off Broadway company Retro Productions. It starred Heather E. Cunningham, David Ian Lee, Matthew Semler and Kristen Vaughan.

Ensemble theatre in Sydney presented the play in June 2023, directed by Mark Kilmurry.
