= Milan Stitt =

American dramatist

- Born: February 9, 1941; Detroit, Michigan, U.S.
- Died: March 12, 2009 (aged 68); New York City, New York, U.S.
- Education: Albion College; University of Michigan (BA); Yale University (MFA)
- Occupations: Playwright, educator

Milan Stitt (February 9, 1941 – March 12, 2009) was an American playwright and educator.

Milan Stitt was born in Detroit, Michigan; he graduated from Cooley High School in 1959. Stitt then studied at Albion College to become a priest before receiving his BA from the University of Michigan and MFA from the Yale School of Drama. At Michigan, he studied play-writing with Kenneth Thorpe Rowe.

As a writer, Stitt was best known for his play based on real-life Michigan events, The Runner Stumbles, named best Broadway Play of 1976 in the annual Best Plays book. The film version of his screenplay was directed by Stanley Kramer with Dick Van Dyke, Kathleen Quinlan, Beau Bridges, Maureen Stapleton, Ray Bolger and Tammy Grimes.

A long-time member of the Circle Repertory Company, his plays produced there included The Runner Stumbles with William Hurt, Back in the Race and Labor Day, which he wrote and directed for Christopher Reeve.

Stitt wrote teleplays and mini-series for all the networks. His CBS television movie, The Gentleman Bandit, was the most-watched film of the season, and Long Shadow, about Haru M. Reischauer for American Playhouse was nominated in 1996 for an International Emmy as Best Teleplay. His articles on theatre and travel appeared in The New York Times and Horizon Magazine.

Stitt worked as a producer and in various administrative capacities at American Shakespeare Festival, Long Wharf Theatre, American Place Theatre and Circle Repertory Company. At the Circle Repertory Company he founded the play development program and served as a dramaturg with such writers as Bill C. Davis, Charles Evered, Albert Innaurato, Arthur Kopit, David Mamet, Lanford Wilson and Paul Zindel. For two years, he served as executive director of Circle Repertory Company producing premiere productions featuring artists Stephen Dietz, Laurence Fishburne, Kevin Heelan, Kikue Tashiro, Fritz Weaver and Louis Zorich.

Stitt was chairman of the play-writing program at the Yale School of Drama for four years. He also taught dramatic writing at Princeton University, University of Michigan and at New York University. He was awarded a university chair and was the Raymond W. Smith Professor of Dramatic Writing at Carnegie Mellon University.

Among his later productions were Places We've Lived for the Pittsburgh New Plays Festival in June 2005. His libretto, co-written with choreographer Terrence Orr, for The Nutcracker continues in repertory at the Pittsburgh Ballet Theatre.

For several years, he served as an Adjudicator for the Ohio University Playwrights Festival and served as a mentor for Ensemble Studio Theater's Next Step Program. He frequently taught workshops and adjudicated new plays for Oakland, Michigan's Heartlande Theatre. He was a member of the Dramatists Guild, Writers Guild of America, Author's League of America, P.E.N., the Eugene O'Neill Society and the National Academy of Television Arts and Sciences.
