= The Dining Room =

Play by A. R. Gurney

- Original language: English
- Written by: A. R. Gurney
- Characters: 3 actors and 3 actresses
- Genre: Comedy

Premiere
- Date: February 24, 1982
- Place: Playwrights Horizons, New York City

The Dining Room is a play by the American playwright A. R. Gurney. It was first produced Off-Broadway at the Studio Theatre of Playwrights Horizons, in 1981.

== Synopsis ==
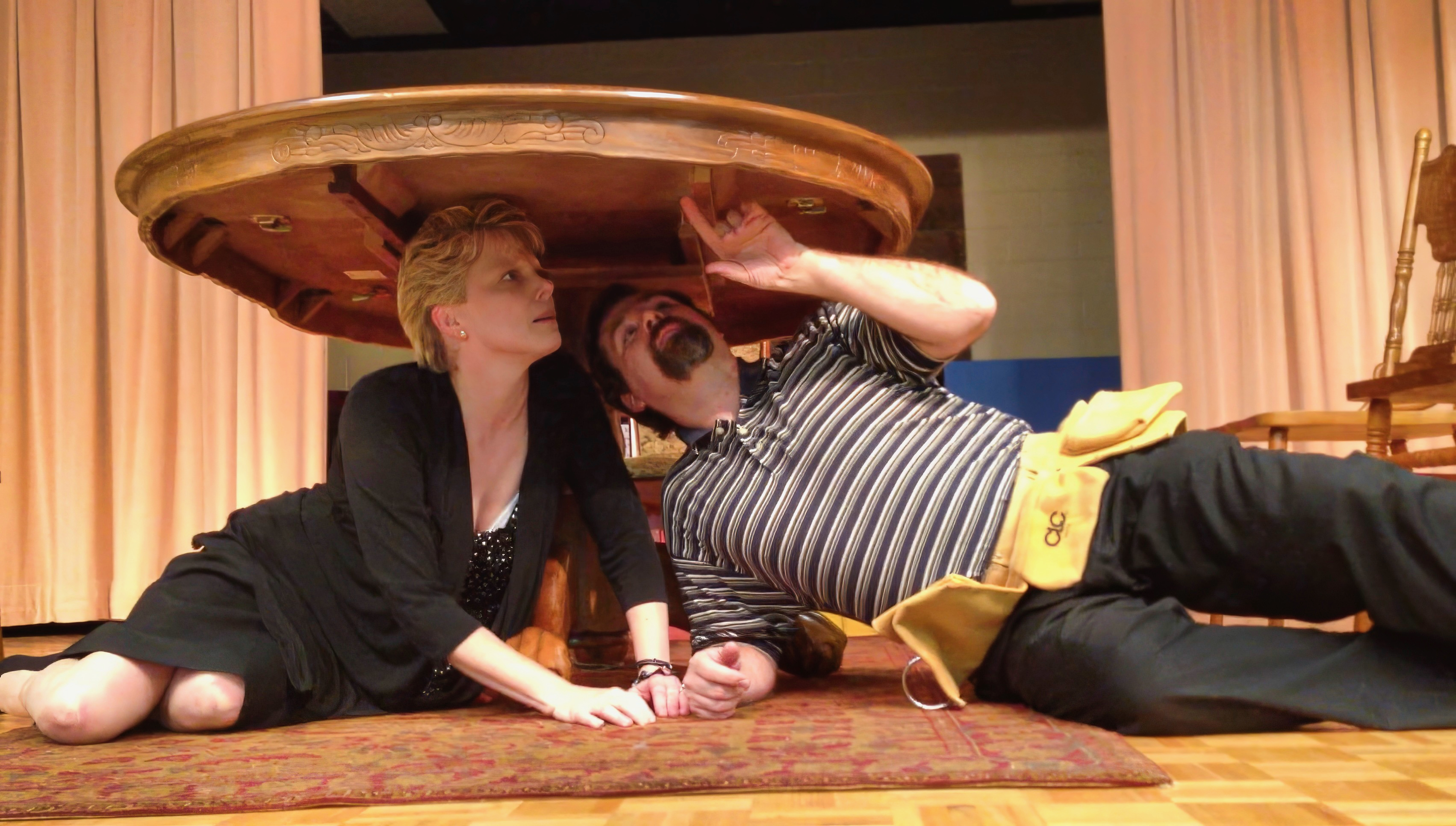
Cast members rehearse a scene from The Dining Room

The play is a comedy of manners, set in a single dining room where 18 scenes from different households overlap and intertwine. Presumably, each story is focused around a different family during different time periods who has in their possession the same dining room furniture set, manufactured in 1898. The stories are about White Anglo-Saxon Protestant (WASP) families. Some scenes are about the furniture itself and the emotional attachment to it, while other scenes simply flesh out the culture of the WASPs. Overall, it tells the story of the dying and relatively short-lived culture of upper-middle class Americans, and the transition into a much more efficient society with less emphasis on tradition and more emphasis on progress. Some characters are made fun of, as is the culture itself, but there is also a genuine longing for the sense of stability, comfort and togetherness that the culture provides.

From the back of the playbook:

The play is set in the dining room of a typical well-to-do household, the place where the family assembled daily for breakfast and dinner and for any and all special occasions. The action is a mosaic of interrelated scenes—some funny, some touching, some rueful—which, taken together, create an in-depth portrait of a vanishing species: the upper-middle-class WASP. The actors change roles, personalities and ages with virtuoso skill as they portray a wide variety of characters, from little boys to stern grandfathers, and from giggling teenage girls to Irish housemaids. Each vignette introduces a new set of people and events; a father lectures his son on grammar and politics; a boy returns from boarding school to discover his mother's infidelity; a senile grandmother doesn't recognize her own sons at Thanksgiving dinner; a daughter, her marriage a shambles, pleads futilely to return home, etc. Dovetailing swiftly and smoothly, the varied scenes coalesce, ultimately, into a theatrical experience of exceptional range, compassionate humor and abundant humanity.

== Productions ==
The Dining Room premiered at the Studio Theatre of Playwrights Horizons on January 31, 1981 and transferred to the Astor Place Theatre on February 24, 1982 and closed on July 17, 1982. Directed by David Trainer, the cast was :

- 1st Actor: Remak Ramsay - Father, Michael, Brewster, Grandfather, Stuart, Gordon, David, Harvey and Host
- 2nd Actor: John Shea - Client, Howard, Psychiatrist, Ted, Paul, Ben, Chris, Jim, Dick and Guest
- 3rd Actor: William H. Macy -Arthur, Boy, Architect, Billy, Nick, Fred, Tony, Standish, and Guest
- 1st Actress: Lois de Banzie - Agent, Mother, Carolyn, Sandra, Dora, Margery, Beth, Kate, Claire, and Ruth
- 2nd Actress: Ann McDonough - Annie, Grace, Peggy, Nancy, Sarah, Harriet, Emily, Annie, and Guest
- 3rd Actress: Pippa Pearthree - Sally, Girl, Ellie, Aggie, Winkie, Old Lady, Helen, Meg, Bertha, and Guest

Sets were by Loren Sherman, costumes by Deborah Shaw, and lighting was by Frances Aronson.

Allan Goldstein directed an episode of Great Performances which filmed this stage production directed by Goldstein and starring Ramsay.

The play was revived Off-Broadway in a Keen Company production on September 20 through October 20, 2007. "A cast of six portrays over 50 characters in the Gurney work, which stars original 1982 Off-Broadway cast member Ann McDonough. Joining McDonough for the Keen Company mounting are Dan Daily, Claire Lautie, Timothy McCracken, Samantha Soule and Mark J. Sullivan."

The play was produced at the Westport Country Playhouse, Connecticut, in May 2013, directed by Mark Lamos.

In March 2022, the play was performed by The Actors Circle at the Providence Playhouse, in Scranton, PA. A cast of eight was used rather than the traditional six.

== Critical response ==
Mel Gussow, in The New York Times, wrote that the play is "an overlapping and amusing anthology of vignettes about family and food, inherited and disowned values."

Frank Rich wrote in The New York Times: "...a series of vignettes that charts the WASP's decline and fall since the depression, has the ruefulness of a collection of John Cheever stories....Both works ['The Middle Ages'] have received fine productions."

The New York Times reviewer (of the Westport production) noted that this is one of Gurney's "most eloquent plays, writing "the 50 or so people who sit at this dining table over the decades belong to the socioethnic group known, sometimes disparagingly and sometimes enviously, as WASPs. It is often said that Gurney writes about a dying breed. Frank Rich’s 1982 review in 'The New York Times' described the play as 'a series of snapshots of a vanishing culture.' "

== Awards and nominations ==
The play was a finalist for the 1985 Pulitzer Prize for Drama.
