= Indian Blood (play) =

Play written by A. R. Gurney

Indian Blood is a play by A. R. Gurney that premiered at the 59East59 Theaters as a Primary Stages production in 2006. The play starred Charles Socarides as Eddie and Jeremy Blackman as his cousin Lambert.

The play was also staged by the Mixed Company in Pittsfield, Massachusetts in 2008.
