= The Cocktail Hour =

Play by A. R. Gurney

- Original language: English
- Written by: A. R. Gurney
- Genre: Comedy
- Setting: 1970s

Premiere
- Date: June 1988
- Place: Old Globe Theatre

The Cocktail Hour is a comedy of manners by A. R. Gurney. It premiered in June 1988 in San Diego, California, at the Old Globe Theatre and, on October 20, 1988, in New York City at the Off Broadway Promenade Theatre. Like many of Gurney's plays, The Cocktail Hour is a comedy exploring the world of upper-class families in the Northeastern United States. A review in The New York Times described it as "an examination of an overprivileged family that fights domestic battles while downing drinks."

== Plot ==
The setting is an upper-class home in the 1970s. The play opens on Bradley and Ann having preprandial cocktails with their middle-aged, ostensibly single son and daughter. The cocktail hour stretches out because "the maid doesn't know how to cook a roast". So the little family carries on consuming increasing amounts of alcohol leading to increasing arguments. Their son, John, is an editor at a publishing company and a part-time playwright. He has written a play that seems to present an unflattering picture of the family, and the parents are upset. The discussion of John's play, which is also called The Cocktail Hour, gives Gurney a lot of opportunity to lampoon the theatre scene.

== Productions ==
The play was directed by Jack O’Brien, who at that time was the Artistic Director of the Old Globe. The original cast consisted of:

- Keene Curtis as the father, Bradley
- Nancy Marchand as the mother, Ann
- Bruce Davison as their son John
- Holland Taylor as their daughter, and John's younger sister, Nina.

=== Critical reception ===
Playwright Gurney has said the play was "probably the most personal thing I had written up to this time". He also revealed that he promised his parents it would not be produced in Buffalo, New York, his hometown where they still resided, during their lifetimes because "the details are so close to home." He added, "The play tries to work within the traditions of a comedy of manners, and simultaneously challenge those traditions as outmoded if not destructive."

The New York Times review in 1988 found the laughter in the first act to be "almost continuous", with the second act being less successful. Nevertheless, "Mr. Gurney still has new and witty observations to make about a nearly extinct patrician class that regards psychiatry as an affront to good manners, underpaid hired help as a birthright and the selling of blue-chip stocks as a first step toward Marxism."

=== Awards and nominations ===
Nancy Marchand won an Obie and was nominated for the Drama Desk Award for Outstanding Actress in a Play. Keene Curtis was nominated for an Obie. Holland Taylor was nominated for the Drama Desk Award for Outstanding Featured Actress in a Play.
