= A. R. Gurney =

American dramatist (1930–2017)

- Born: Albert Ramsdell Gurney Jr. November 1, 1930; Buffalo, New York, U.S.
- Died: June 13, 2017 (aged 86); Manhattan, New York City, U.S.
- Education: Williams College (BA); Yale University (MFA)
- Occupations: Playwright; novelist; screenwriter; academic
- Spouse: Mary Forman Goodyear (m. 1957)
- Children: 4
- Writing career
- Genre: Theatre
- Notable works: Love Letters; The Cocktail Hour; The Dining Room; Sweet Sue

Albert Ramsdell Gurney Jr. (November 1, 1930 – June 13, 2017) (sometimes credited as Pete Gurney) was an American playwright, novelist and academic.

Gurney is known for plays including The Dining Room (1982), Sweet Sue (1986/7), The Cocktail Hour (1988), and for his Pulitzer Prize nominated play Love Letters (1988). His series of plays about upper-class WASP life in contemporary America have been called "penetratingly witty studies of the WASP ascendancy in retreat."

== Early life ==
Gurney was born on November 1, 1930, in Buffalo, New York, to Albert Ramsdell Gurney Sr. (1896–1977), who was president of Gurney, Becker and Bourne, an insurance and real estate company in Buffalo, and Marion Spaulding (1908-2001). His parents had three children, of which Gurney was the middle: (1) Evelyn Gurney Miller (b. 1929), (2) Albert Ramsdell Gurney Jr. (b. 1930), and (3) Stephen S. Gurney (b. 1933).

His maternal grandparents were Elbridge G. Spaulding (1881–1974) and Marion Caryl Ely (1887–1971). Ely was the daughter of William Caryl Ely (1856–1921), politician and lawyer, Member of the New York State Assembly in 1883. Gurney's 2x great-grandfather was Elbridge G. Spaulding (1809–1897), a former Mayor of Buffalo, NY State Treasurer, and member of the U.S. House of Representatives who supported the idea for the first U.S. currency not backed by gold or silver, thus credited with helping to keep the Union economy afloat during the Civil War.

Gurney attended the private school Nichols School in Buffalo and graduated from St. Paul's School in Concord, New Hampshire. He attended Williams College, graduating in 1952, and the Yale School of Drama, graduating in 1958, after which he began teaching Humanities at MIT.

== Career ==
In 1959, following graduation from Yale, Gurney taught English and Latin at a day school, Belmont Hill School, in Belmont, Massachusetts, for one year. He then joined Massachusetts Institute of Technology as a professor of humanities (1960–96) and professor of literature (1970–96).

He began writing plays such as Children and The Middle Ages while at MIT, but it was his great success with The Dining Room that allowed him to write full-time. After The Dining Room, Gurney wrote a number of plays, most of them concerning WASPs of the American northeast. While at Yale, Gurney also wrote Love in Buffalo, the first musical ever produced at the Yale School of Drama. Since then, he was known as a prolific writer.

His first play in New York, which ran for just one performance in October 1968, The David Show, premiered at the Players' Theater on MacDougal Street. The play was cut after its first show by sneers from the entire press except for two enthusiasts, Edith Oliver in The New Yorker and another from the Village Voice.

His 2015 play, Love and Money, is about a mature woman making plans to dispose of her fortune, and the twists that ensue. The world premiere was at New York's Signature Theatre in August 2015. Before that, The Grand Manner, a play about his real life encounter with famed actress Katharine Cornell in her production of Shakespeare's Antony and Cleopatra, was produced and performed by Lincoln Center for the summer of 2010. It was also produced in Buffalo by the Kavinoky Theatre. He appeared in several of his plays including The Dining Room and most notably Love Letters.

== Personal life ==
In June, 1957, Gurney married Molly Goodyear, a granddaughter of Anson Goodyear. They lived in Boston until 1983, when they moved their family to New York to be near the theater, television, and publishers while he was on sabbatical from MIT. Together, they had four children:

- George Goodyear Gurney, who married Constance "Connie" Lyman Warren in 1985.
- Amy Ramsdell Gurney, who married Frederick Snow Nicholas III in 1985.
- Evelyn "Evie" R. Gurney
- Benjamin Gurney

Gurney's father, Albert Ramsdell Gurney Sr., died in 1977 and Molly's mother, Sarah Norton, died in 1978. After their deaths, his mother, Marion, married Molly's father, George, and remained married until Marion's death in 2001, followed by George's death in 2002.

=== Death ===
Gurney died at his home in Manhattan, on June 13, 2017, at the age of 86.

== Awards and honors ==
In 2006, Gurney was elected a member of the American Academy of Arts and Letters.

In 2007, Gurney received the PEN/Laura Pels International Foundation for Theater Award as a master American dramatist.

Gurney was awarded the Lifetime Achievement Award at the 2016 Obie Awards presented by the American Theatre Wing and The Village Voice.

== Literary work ==
=== Themes ===
Gurney's plays often explore the theme of declining upper-class "WASP" (White Anglo-Saxon Protestant) life in contemporary America. The Wall Street Journal has called his works "penetratingly witty studies of the WASP ascendancy in retreat." Several of his works are loosely based on his patrician upbringing, including The Cocktail Hour and Indian Blood. The New York Times drama critic Frank Rich, in his review of The Dining Room, wrote, "As a chronicler of contemporary America's most unfashionable social stratum—upper-middle-class WASPs, this playwright has no current theatrical peer."

In his 1988 play, "The Cocktail Hour", the lead character tells her playwright son that theater critics "don't like us.... They resent us. They think we're all Republicans, all superficial and all alcoholics. Only the latter [sic] is true." The New York Times described the play as witty observations about a nearly extinct patrician class that regards psychiatry as an affront to good manners, underpaid hired help as a birthright.

In a 1989 interview with The New York Times, Gurney said, "Just as it's mentioned in The Cocktail Hour,' my great-grandfather hung up his clothes one day and walked into the Niagara River and no one understood why." Gurney added that "he was a distinguished man in Buffalo. My father could never mention it, and it affected the family well into the fourth generation as a dark and unexplainable gesture. It made my father and his father desperate to be accepted, to be conventional, and comfortable. It made them commit themselves to an ostensibly easy bourgeois world. They saw it so precariously, but the reason was never mentioned. I first learned about it after my father died."

Gurney told The Washington Post in 1982:

WASPs do have a culture—traditions, idiosyncrasies, quirks, particular signals and totems we pass on to one another. But the WASP culture, or at least that aspect of the culture I talk about, is enough in the past so that we can now look at it with some objectivity, smile at it, and even appreciate some of its values. There was a closeness of family, a commitment to duty, to stoic responsibility, which I think we have to say weren't entirely bad."

=== Plays ===
- Ancestral Voices
- Another Antigone (ISBN 978-0-8222-0051-2)
- Big Bill
- Black Tie (ISBN 978-0-8222-2526-3)
- Buffalo Gal
- A Cheever Evening (based on stories by John Cheever; ISBN 978-0-8222-1458-8)
- Children (ISBN 978-0-8222-0202-8)
- The Cocktail Hour (ISBN 978-0-8222-0225-7)
- The Comeback (ISBN 978-0-8222-0229-5)
- Crazy Mary
- Darlene
- The David Show
- The Dining Room (ISBN 978-0-8222-0310-0)
- Family Furniture
- Far East
- The Fourth Wall (ISBN 978-0-8222-1349-9)
- The Golden Age (ISBN 978-0-8222-0455-8)
- The Golden Fleece
- The Grand Manner (ISBN 978-0-8222-2514-0)
- The Guest Lecturer
- Heresy
- Human Events
- Indian Blood
- Labor Day (ISBN 978-0-8222-1685-8)
- Later Life (ISBN 978-0-8222-1373-4)
- The Love Course (ISBN 978-0-5736-2282-3)
- Love Letters (ISBN 978-0-8222-0694-1)
- The Middle Ages (ISBN 978-0-8222-0753-5)
- Mrs. Farnsworth
- Office Hours (ISBN 978-0-8222-2515-7)
- O Jerusalem
- The Old Boy (ISBN 978-0-8222-0840-2)
- The Old One-Two (ISBN 978-0-5736-2370-7)
- The Open Meeting
- Overtime (ISBN 978-0-8222-1540-0)
- The Perfect Party (ISBN 978-0-8222-0886-0)
- Post Mortem
- The Problem
- The Rape of Bunny Stuntz (ISBN 978-0-5736-2439-1)
- Richard Cory (ISBN 978-0-8222-1245-4)
- Scenes from American Life
- Screen Play
- "Squash"
- The Snow Ball (based on his novel; ISBN 978-0-8222-1318-5)
- Sweet Sue (ISBN 978-0-8222-1106-8)
- Sylvia (ISBN 978-0-8222-1496-0)
- The Wayside Motor Inn (ISBN 978-0-8222-1225-6)
- What I Did Last Summer (ISBN 978-0-8222-1236-2)
- Who Killed Richard Cory? (ISBN 978-0-8222-1236-2)

=== Novels ===
Gurney has also written several novels, including:

- The Snow Ball (1984)
- The Gospel According to Joe (1974)
- Entertaining Strangers (1977)
- Early American (1996)

=== Screenplays ===
- The House of Mirth (1972)
- Sylvia (1995)
