= Arnaldo Santana =

American film, stage and television actor (1950–1987)

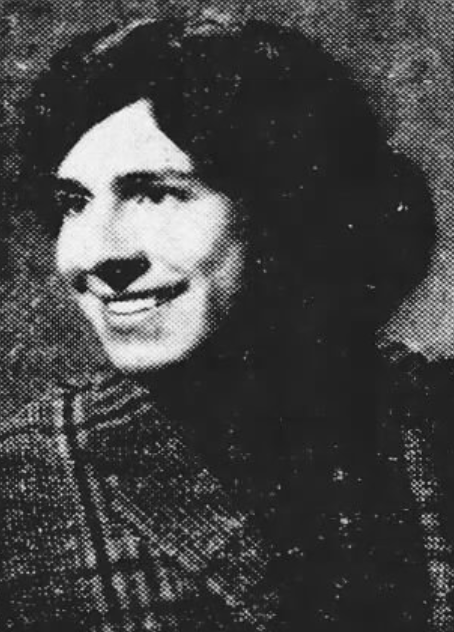
- Santana in 1972
- Born: Luis Arnaldo Santana; September 1, 1950; El Paso, Texas, U.S.
- Died: October 8, 1987 (aged 37); New York, U.S.
- Education: University of Texas at Austin
- Occupation: Actor

Luis Arnaldo Santana (September 1, 1950 – October 8, 1987) was an American film, stage and television actor. He was best known for playing Tony Montana's henchman Ernie in the film Scarface (1983).

== Life and career ==
Luis Arnaldo Santana was born on September 1, 1950, in El Paso, Texas, the son of Mariano Santana and Lilia Zuniga. He attended and graduated from Burges High School. After graduating, he attended the University of Texas at Austin, studying drama. He acted in numerous stage productions at the Upstairs Downtown Theater, and at Festival Theater in Montana. He began his screen career in 1977 appearing in the gay pornographic film The Boys from Riverside Drive. The next year, he appeared in the pornographic films A Night at the Adonis and Dune Buddies.

Later in his career, Santana guest-starred in television programs including The Doctors and Nurse. He also appeared in films such as Scarface (as Tony Montana's henchman Ernie), Cruising and Rage of Angels. In 1984, he starred as Pablo Rivera's brother-in-law Hector Del Gato in the ABC sitcom television series a.k.a. Pablo, starring along with Paul Rodriguez, Héctor Elizondo, Joe Santos, Alma Cuervo, Martha Veléz, Maria Richwine, Bert Rosario and Katy Jurado.

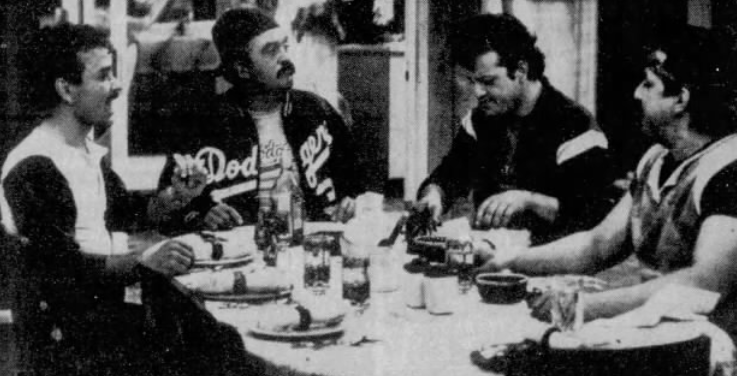
Santana (right) with Bert Rosario, Joe Santos and Paul Rodriguez in a.k.a. Pablo, 1984

Santana retired from acting in 1984, last appearing in the stage play Short Eyes.

== Death ==
Santana died in New York on October 8, 1987, at the age of 37.
