= George Killion =

American businessman and politician

George L. Killion
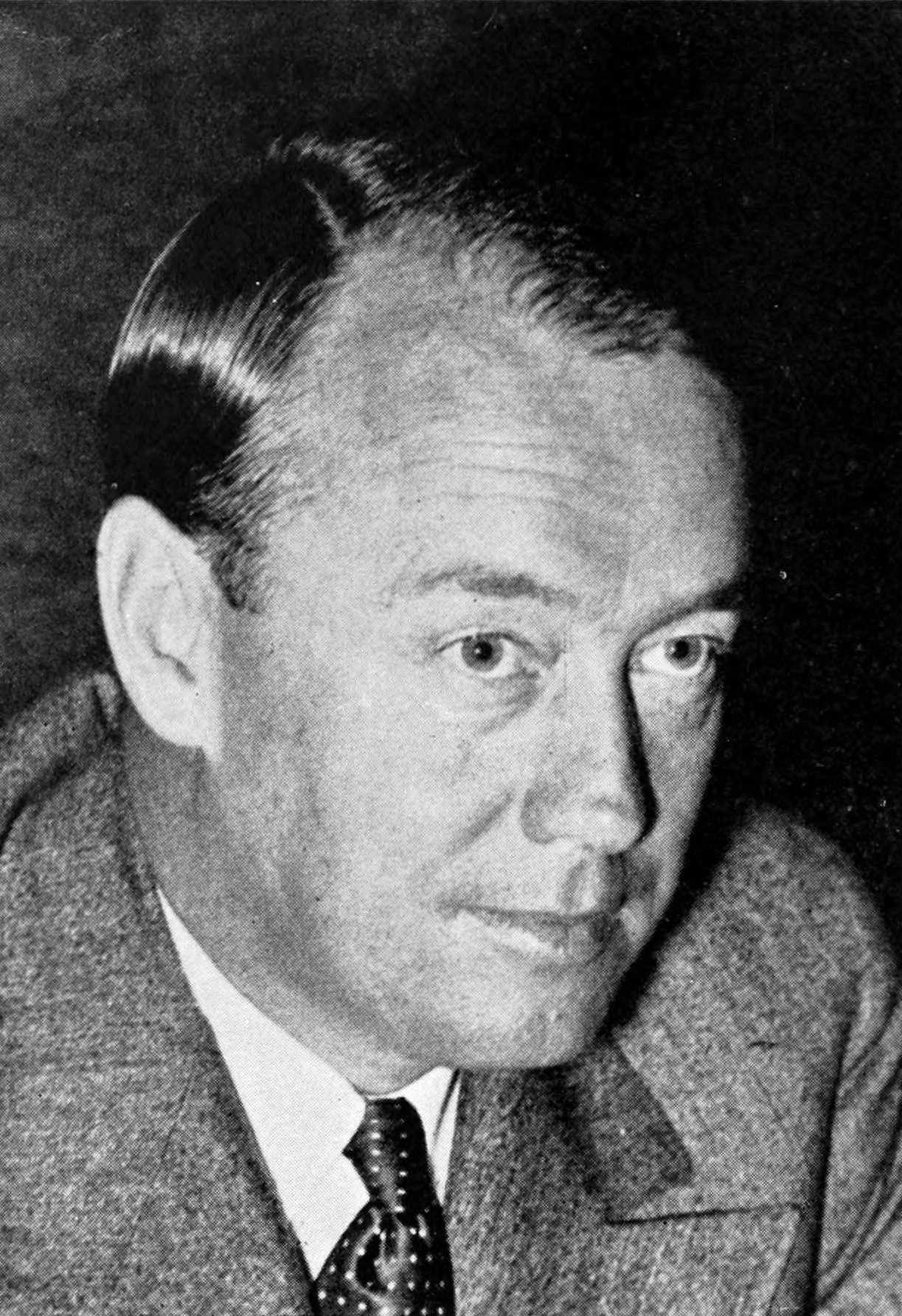
- Killion c. 1940

Treasurer of the Democratic National Committee
- In office May 4, 1945 – August 13, 1947
- Preceded by: Edwin W. Pauley
- Succeeded by: Joe L. Blythe

Director of the California Department of Finance
- In office September 11, 1940 – January 3, 1943
- Appointed by: Culbert Olson
- Preceded by: John R. Richards
- Succeeded by: John Hassler

Personal details
- Born: April 15, 1901 Steamboat Springs, Colorado, U.S.
- Died: January 16, 1983 (aged 81) Stanford, California, U.S.
- Party: Democratic
- Spouse(s): Grace Harris (m. 1922; died 1965) Margaretha Rahneberg
- Children: James
- Education: University of Southern California; University of California, Los Angeles; University of California, Berkeley; University of Michigan
- Occupation: Businessman, politician

Military service
- Allegiance: United States
- Branch/service: United States Army
- Years of service: 1943–1944
- Rank: Major
- Battles/wars: World War II

George L. Killion (April 15, 1901 – January 16, 1983) was an American business and political leader who served as president of the American President Lines, chairman of Metro-Goldwyn-Mayer, and treasurer of the Democratic National Committee.

== Early life ==
Killion was born on April 15, 1901, in Steamboat Springs, Colorado. He attended the University of Southern California, University of California (at Los Angeles and Berkeley), and University of Michigan. Killion became a reporter in 1922 and wrote for newspapers in San Diego, Long Beach, Los Angeles, and Sacramento. In 1930 he started a public relations firm in San Francisco.

== Politics ==
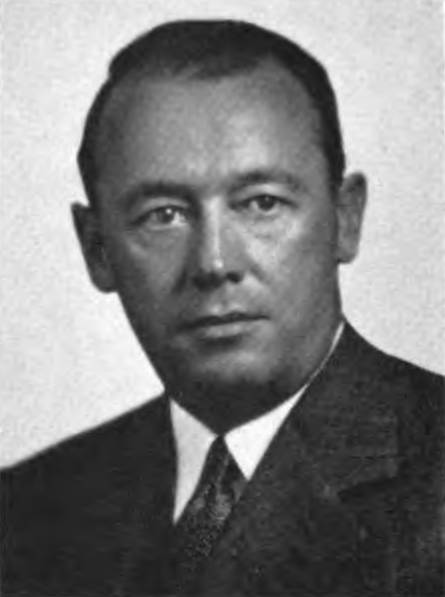
Killion c. 1942

In 1939, Killion joined the administration of Governor Culbert Olson as a secretary and public relations officer. He also served as a member of the state racing commission. Later that year he was made the state's deputy director of finance. On September 11, 1940, Olson announced Killion's promotion to state finance director. In this role, Killion helped balance the state's budget for the first time in decades. He held this job until Olson left office on January 3, 1943.

In 1943, Killion joined the United States Army as a major. He served as a special assistant to the Petroleum Administrator for War until 1944. After leaving the Army, Killion served as the national finance director of the Democratic National Committee. On May 3, 1945, he was named treasurer of the committee.

On April 21, 1966, Killion was named Disaster Acting Governor #1 by California Governor Pat Brown, which placed Killion first in the gubernatorial line of succession if all of the state's constitutional and legislative officers were killed. Later that year he was named an alternate representative to the United Nations with the rank of ambassador by President Lyndon B. Johnson.

In 1970, Killion broke with the Democratic party and endorsed Republican Ronald Reagan for Governor. Two years later he was appointed a national vice chairman of Democrats for Nixon.

== Business ==
On August 12, 1947, Killion was elected president of the American President Lines. He led the company for nearly two decades, retiring on May 1, 1966.

On January 3, 1957, Killion was elected to the board of directors of Loews Inc. (later renamed Metro-Goldwyn-Mayer Inc.) On July 29, 1957, he became chairman of the company's executive committee. The following year he was replaced as head of the executive committee by Joseph Vogel and became chairman of the board of directors. He stepped down on January 9, 1963, in favor of outgoing MGM president Joseph Vogel. However at the next annual meeting, Vogel was removed and one month later Killion returned as chairman. In 1968 he was succeeded by Robert O'Brien in a shakeup that saw General Mills executive Louis F. Polk Jr. succeed O'Brien as president.

Killion also served as a director of COMSAT, World Airways, Security Pacific Bank, and First Western Bank.

== Personal life ==
Killion's first wife, Grace Harris Killion, died in 1965. He died on January 16, 1983, of cardiorespiratory arrest at the Stanford University Medical Center. He was a resident of Menlo Park, California at the time of his death. He was survived by his second wife, Margaretha Rahneberg, a son, and a stepson. He was buried in Holy Cross Cemetery in Menlo Park.

Political offices
Preceded by John R. Richards	California Director of Finance; 1939–1943	Succeeded by John Hassler
Party political offices
Preceded by Edwin W. Pauley	Treasurer of the Democratic National Committee; 1945–1947	Succeeded by Joe L. Blythe
Business positions
Preceded by Henry F. Grady	President of the American President Lines; 1947–1966	Succeeded by Raymond W. Ickes
Preceded by Ogden Reid	Chairman of the Loews Executive Committee; 1957–1958	Succeeded by Joseph Vogel
Preceded by Position created Joseph Vogel	Chairman of the Loews/Metro-Goldwyn-Mayer Board of Directors; 1958–1963; 1963–1968	Succeeded by Joseph Vogel; Robert O'Brien
