= Raymond W. Ickes =

American shipping executive (1912–2000)

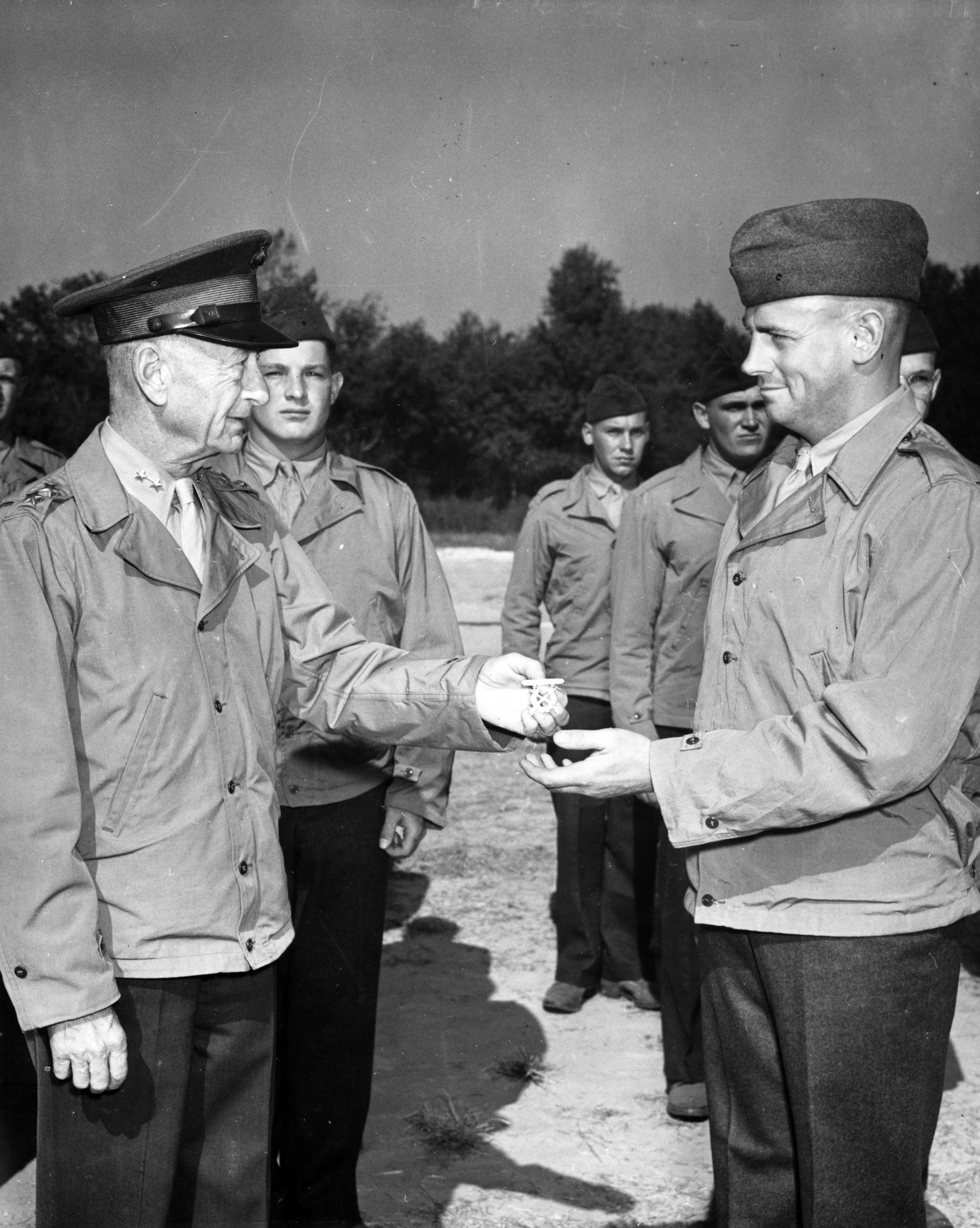
- Ickes (right) receiving an expert rifleman medal from Maj. Gen. Emile P. Moses
- Born: Raymond Wilmarth Ickes; June 23, 1912; Evanston, Illinois, U.S.
- Died: March 2, 2000 (aged 87); Berkeley, California, U.S.
- Education: University of Chicago
- Occupation: Former Pacific Far East Line and the American President Lines president
- Years active: 1939–1968
- Spouse: Miralotte Sauer (m. 1939; died 1978); Janet Ickes
- Children: 2
- Parent(s): Harold L. Ickes and Anna Wilmarth Ickes
- Relatives: Harold M. Ickes (brother); Louis W. Sauer (father-in-law)

Raymond Wilmarth Ickes (June 23, 1912 – March 2, 2000) was an American shipping executive who was president of the Pacific Far East Line and the American President Lines. He was the son of United States Secretary of the Interior Harold L. Ickes.

== Early life ==
Ickes was born on June 23, 1912, in Evanston, Illinois to Harold L. Ickes and his first wife, Anna Wilmarth Ickes. His mother died in 1935 and one of his half-siblings from his father's second marriage was White House Deputy Chief of Staff Harold M. Ickes. He earned his bachelor's, master's, and law degrees from the University of Chicago, where he was a member of the polo, swimming, and wrestling teams.

== Legal career and military service ==
In 1939, Ickes became an assistant United States Attorney for the Southern District of New York. He was later transferred to Peru, where he assisted with the internment of Japanese Latin Americans.

In 1943, Ickes was granted military leave and enlisted in the United States Marine Corps. He later received an officer's commission. He was a second lieutenant with the 9th Marine Regiment and was wounded in the chest during the Battle of Iwo Jima. He was awarded a Purple Heart and a Silver Star.

After the war, Ickes resumed his career in the United States Department of Justice. He helped gather evidence for the Nuremberg trials and investigated the internment of Germans deported from Latin America during World War II. He resigned in 1946 to enter private law practice.

== Shipping executive ==
In 1949, Ickes moved to San Francisco to become assistant to the president of the American Independent Oil Company. In 1958, he became the vice president of the Natomas Company, which owned a large interest in the Pacific Far East Line and the American President Lines. In 1960, he became vice president and general counsel of the Pacific Far East Line. He became an executive vice president and director the following year and was promoted to president in 1962. In 1966, he became the president of the American President Lines, which was considering a merger with the Pacific Far East Line. He retired in 1968.

== Personal life ==
On December 16, 1939, Ickes married Miralotte Sauer, daughter of Louis W. Sauer. Both Raymond and Miralotte Ickes were sport shooters. He tied the Marine Corps Recruit Depot Parris Island rifle range record, won championships in 16 states, and won the 1951 Marine Corps Cup. Miralotte Ickes won four consecutive Women's National High Power Championship from 1957 and 1960. Their daughter, Andrea, was also a champion shooter. Miralotte Ickes died in 1978.

Ickes died on March 2, 2000 at his home in Berkeley, California. He was survived by his second wife, two children, and a stepson.

Business positions
Preceded by Clarence G. Morse	President of the Pacific Far East Line; 1962–1966	Succeeded by Leo C. Ross
Preceded by George Killion	President of the American President Lines; 1966–1968	Succeeded by Worth B. Fowler
