= Latin Kings (disambiguation) =

The Latin Kings are a Latino street gang, founded in Chicago in 1954.

Latin Kings, Latin kings, or The Latin Kings may also refer to:

- Kings of Alba Longa, a series of legendary kings of Alba Longa, an ancient city in Latium, or their predecessors
- Kings of Jerusalem, the rulers of the Latin Catholic Crusader state which comprised the city
- The Latin Kings (group), a Swedish hip hop group
- The Original Latin Kings of Comedy
