= G. Clark Ramsay =

American film executive (1915–1977)

Ramsay in 1977

G. Clark Ramsay (1915–November 29, 1977) was an American film executive. He served in various positions at MGM from 1958 until 1972, being vice president of production from 1967 to 1969 and vice president of administration from 1969 to 1972. He then became vice president of advertising at Universal, where his advertising campaign for Jaws was credited as an integral aspect of the film's commercial success.

== Early life ==
Ramsay was born in 1915. He attended Fremont High School in Sunnyvale, California, graduating in 1933. He joined Universal Studios in 1940 and was promoted to advertising manager the following year, serving in that role until 1946.

== Career ==
After his work with Universal, Ramsay became vice president of the Monroe Greenthal Company, which handled advertising for several film companies. In 1952, he returned to Universal as executive assistant to vice president of advertising David Lipton.

Ramsay had an advertising background, working for Universal International and MGM, which he joined in 1958. He became assistant to MGM studio president Robert O'Brien in April 1963. When Robert M. Weitman resigned as head of production in 1967, Ramsay took over.

While at MGM, he attempted to make a film version of Tai Pan.

In 1969, Ramsay became a vice president of administration for MGM. He stayed in this position until late 1972, when he resigned from the studio and joined Universal the following year as a vice president in charge of advertising. His publicity work played a role in making Jaws a commercial success, starting an advertising campaign two years prior to the film's release. In 1976 he became a vice president of MCA and stayed there until his death.

== Personal life, death, and legacy ==
Ramsay had two children: a daughter, Christine Gayner, and a son, Todd Ramsay. He died of cancer in 1977 at the age of 62, survived by his children and wife, Margaret. His legacy in the world of film marketing was felt for several years after, with the University of Southern California holding a seminar in his memory in 1982.
