= Escape from Babylon =

Studio album by Martha Veléz
- Released: 1976
- Recorded: 1975
- Studio: Harry J. Studio (Kingston, Jamaica); Plaza Sound (New York)
- Genre: Reggae, reggae pop, R&B, blues
- Length: 30:48
- Label: Sire; Wounded Bird Records (reissue)
- Producer: Bob Marley

Martha Veléz chronology
Matinée Weepers (1973)	Escape from Babylon (1976)	American Heartbeat (1977)

Escape from Babylon is the sixth studio album by Nuyorican singer Martha Veléz. The album was a collaboration with Jamaican singer Bob Marley after producer Craig Leon encouraged him to do so. Released in 1976, the album is produced by Marley and was recorded at Harry J. Studio in Kingston, Jamaica. It features two Marley covers ("Bend Down Low" and "Get Up, Stand Up"), two compositions from Marley, and a Veléz-Marley composition called "Disco Night".

== Background and music ==
The collaboration between Veléz and Bob Marley came to be when producer Craig Leon asked him to do music with her. Marley listened to her song "Living Outside the Law", from her 1972 album Hypnotized and felt a "philosophical kinship with her". In May 1975, Veléz traveled to Jamaica for three weeks to record the album at Harry J. Studio in Kingston. Marley served as producer, while Leon and Lee "Scratch" Perry served as co-producers. The Wailers guitarist Al Anderson had also previously worked with Veléz in 1973. The album features a total of eight tracks. Three of them are Veléz' compositions, two were Bob Marley covers, and another one was a collaboration between both called "Disco Night". The other two songs were Marley compositions, but were attributed to Marley's wife, Rita.

== Critical reception ==
Critic Dave Marsh, from New York Post, called the album "perhaps the oddest recording project of the year" adding that it was "commercially palatable, mainly because the material is excellent."

== Track listing ==
All tracks written by Martha Veléz, except where noted.

Side one
No.	Title	Writer(s)	Length
1.	"Money Man"		3:34
2.	"There You Are"	Rita Marley	3:04
3.	"Wild Bird"		5:06
4.	"Disco Night"	Martha Veléz, Rita Marley	3:29

Side two
No.	Title	Writer(s)	Length
6.	"Bend Down Low"	Bob Marley	3:36
7.	"Happiness"	Rita Marley	3:04
8.	"Come On In"		5:05
9.	"Get Up, Stand Up"	Bob Marley, Peter Tosh	3:31

== Personnel ==
=== Musicians ===
- Aston Barrett: bass
- Carlton Barrett: drums
- Al Anderson: guitars
- Earl "Chinna" Smith: guitars
- Tyrone Downie: organ
- Bernard "Touter" Harvey: piano
- Gladstone Anderson: piano
- Winston Wright: piano
- Lee Perry: percussion
- Bob Marley: percussion
- The Zap Pow Horns: horns
- The I Threes (Rita Marley, Judy Mowatt, Marcia Griffiths): backing vocals
- Martha Veléz: backing vocals

=== Production and recording ===
- Bob Marley: producer
- Craig Leon, Lee Perry: co-producers
- Rob Freeman, Syl Morris: engineers
- Lee Hulko: mastering
- David Nutter: photograph
- Fred Marcellino: design
- Richard Gottehrer: coordinator
