= A Matter of Wife... and Death =

- Print ad
- Genre: Crime; Drama; Mystery
- Written by: Don Ingalls
- Directed by: Marvin Chomsky
- Starring: Rod Taylor; Anne Archer; Cesare Danova; John Colicos; Luke Askew; Larry Block; Anita Gillette; Joe Santos
- Music by: Richard Shores
- Country of origin: United States
- Original language: English

Production
- Producer: Robert M. Weitman
- Production location: Los Angeles
- Cinematography: Emmett Bergholz
- Editor: David Wages
- Running time: 73 minutes
- Production company: Columbia Pictures Television

Original release
- Network: NBC
- Release: May 3, 1975

A Matter of Wife... and Death is a 1975 American made-for-television crime drama mystery film. It is a sequel to the 1973 film Shamus and was intended as a pilot for a series. The teleplay was written by Don Ingalls and the film directed by Marvin Chomsky, with former head of production at MGM Robert M. Weitman as the producer. The film was broadcast on NBC on May 3, 1975.

Rod Taylor played the part of the private detective Shamus McCoy, a role originated by Burt Reynolds. The cast also included Anne Archer, Cesare Danova, John Colicos, Luke Askew, Larry Block, Anita Gillette, and Joe Santos reprising his Shamus role of Lieutenant Promuto. Wonder Woman actress Lynda Carter also played a small role as Shamus's girlfriend.

The film ran for 73 minutes in color with monoaural sound, and was released by Columbia.
