= Shamus (film) =

1973 film by Buzz Kulik

- Directed by: Buzz Kulik
- Written by: Barry Beckerman
- Produced by: Robert M. Weitman
- Starring: Burt Reynolds; Dyan Cannon; John Ryan; Joe Santos; Giorgio Tozzi; Ron Weyand
- Cinematography: Victor J. Kemper
- Edited by: Walter Thompson
- Music by: Jerry Goldsmith
- Production company: Robert M. Weitman Productions
- Distributed by: Columbia Pictures
- Release date: January 31, 1973
- Running time: 99 minutes
- Country: United States
- Language: English
- Box office: $3,300,000 (US / Canada rentals)

Shamus is a 1973 American comedy thriller film directed by Buzz Kulik, and starring Burt Reynolds and Dyan Cannon. The word "shamus" means "detective" in American slang, although it is an uncommon definition in contemporary American parlance.

== Plot ==
A man named Victor Papas is attacked by two men at his home and burned to death with a flamethrower, along with his girlfriend. Shamus McCoy, a private detective in Brooklyn, New York, receives a request from E.J. Hume, a wealthy man who runs many companies, to find the diamonds that were stolen from Papas as well as about the murderers. Hume says that Papas stole several million dollar worth of diamonds from Hume just before he was killed. McCoy wonders why he was selected to do the job, but is attracted by the high fee and accepts the proposal. McCoy uses his friend Springy, an informant, and a drug dealer he knows to investigate Papas' background, and finds out that he and his girlfriend worked for a company called River Edge Export.

According to Springy's information, the president of River Edge Export is Felix Montaigne, a famous former football player. After retiring from football, he was hired as an executive at River Edge Export, and apparently raised a large amount of money from somewhere, and a year later he bought the company and became the president. It is also revealed that Papas had connections with Bolton, a bouncer at a bar called “Health Club”. Shamus waits for the bar to close and ambushes Bolton, and beats him up and extracts information from him, and he is told that Felix killed Papas.

The next morning, McCoy visits Felix Montaigne's luxurious apartment, where Alexis, the woman he met the night before at the Health Club, appears. She is Felix's elder sister. Felix, who is at home, admits that Papas and his girlfriend worked for his company, but says he does not know about their criminal activities. When asked about the source of the funds to buy the company, he hints at the existence of a partner, but does not reveal who it is.

A few days later, Shamus is attacked by three thugs and warned to "forget about Papas." Alexis also visits McCoy's apartment and asks him to investigate her brother Felix, whose behavior has been strange lately. McCoy, who is attracted to Alexis, accepts the job.

The next day, McCoy sneaks into the River Edge Export warehouse and discovers a large number of weapons, including machine guns, and a man's dead body hidden there. He is discovered by a trio of assassins, but manages to escape. After that, he learns that Hume is the major shareholder of River Edge Export, and realizes that this is not a case he can handle, so he tells Hume that he cannot continue the investigation. He then visits Colonel Hardcore of the Army Weapons Depot, whose signature was on the invoice he obtained at the warehouse. Of course, Shamus does so while disguised as a weapons dealer. As expected, the colonel has been illegally selling weapons to River Edge Export. While colonel is explaining about tanks and other things to McCoy outside, he is shot and killed by two men in a car, while McCoy barely escapes.

Then, it turns out that, as Bolton said, it was Felix who killed Papas and stole the jewels. Hume had asked McCoy to investigate, not knowing that Felix had done it. However, as McCoy's investigation progressed, Hume feared that his arms smuggling would be revealed, so he sent a hitman to eliminate McCoy. Also, Springy was killed by someone.

McCoy breaks into Hume's mansion and confronts Hume, but he is bitten by Hume's ferocious dog and is captured by his minions. In the room, he finds Felix, who has been beaten and is on the verge of death. When McCoy and Felix are taken outside, McCoy escapes from the minions, but Felix is shot to death. McCoy subdues Hume's minions one by one and finally stops Hume from escaping in a car. The police arrives and Hume is arrested.

== Cast ==
- Burt Reynolds as Shamus McCoy
- Dyan Cannon as Alexis Montaigne
- John Ryan as "Hardcore"
- Joe Santos as Lieutenant Promuto
- Giorgio Tozzi as Dottore
- Ron Weyand as E.J. Hume
- Larry Block as "Springy"
- Beeson Carroll as Bolton
- Kevin Conway as The Kid
- Kay Frye as Bookstore Girl
- John Glover as Johnnie
- Merwin Goldsmith as Schnook
- Melody Santangello as Alice
- Irving Selbst as Heavy
- Alex Wison as Felix Montaigne
- John Amato Jr. as Willie
- Lou Martell as Rock
- Tommy Lane as Tait
- Marshall Anker as Dealer

== Production ==
=== Development ===
The film was produced by Robert M. Weitman, who had a multi-picture deal with Columbia, the first of which was The Anderson Tapes. Reynolds' signing was announced in February 1972. By this stage Buzz Kulik was attached as director and Sam Pessim was writing the script.

Weitman had known Reynolds since the 1960s when he tried to get the actor to appear in a TV series The Lieutenant. Weitman discovered Barry Beckerman's script when he was at MGM in the 1960s. It was then set in the 1940s. Weitman took the script with him when he went to Columbia and set it up as his second film there, getting Beckerman to rewrite it so it was set in the 1970s. Steve McQueen was suggested for the lead but Weitman wanted to go with Reynolds. "To me", he said, "Burt had always worked. I looked at things he'd done and said 'He's funny. He throws away lines like a Kleenex. He was like a hidden iceberg'."

It was the first film Reynolds signed for since publication of the Cosmo centerfold.

Dyan Cannon had been in semi-retirement since her bad experience on Such Good Friends but agreed to make the film after seeing Reynolds perform on stage in The Rainmaker. "It's Bogart and Bacall all over again", said Weitman.

== Filming locations ==
Filmed in New York City, military scenes filmed at Headquarters 1/101 Cavalry NYARNG (New York Army National Guard) located at 321 Manor Road, Staten Island, New York. End credits mention special thanks to The 42nd Division (Rainbow Division) 1/101 Cavalry. Scenes were also filmed at the former Rochroane Castle and Halsey Pond in Irvington, New York.

During filming Reynolds was mobbed by 3,000 fans.

== Reception ==
Variety wrote a negative review of Shamus stating that the film is "confusing...scripter Barry Beckerman drags in an assortment of mostly unexplained characters but some dandy rough work – and finales in a fine fog. Perhaps something was lost in translation to the screen." Roger Greenspun wrote that the film "is full of appealing New York locations and much inventive action, ultimately amounts to little more than the kind of situation melodrama that the movies these days offer for excitement. On this level it is workmanlike, well paced, modest, sometimes scary, and sometimes genuinely funny."

Burt Reynolds said it was "not a bad film, kind of cute. If the picture had been as good as the title sequence it would have made millions. As it was it made $5 million."

On the review aggregator website Rotten Tomatoes, 25% of eight critics' reviews are positive, with an average rating of 4.5/10.

== Sequel ==
Robert M. Weitman produced a TV movie about the same character titled A Matter of Wife... and Death (1976) with the role played by Rod Taylor. It was a pilot for a prospective series that did not come to be.

== See also ==
- List of American films of 1973
