= A.k.a. Pablo =

a.k.a. Pablo
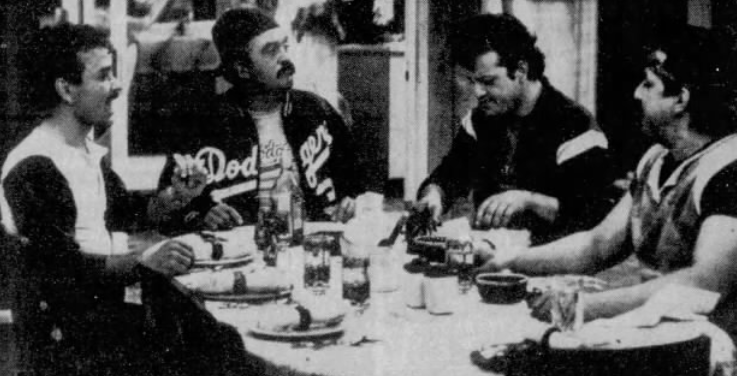
- Bert Rosario, Joe Santos, Paul Rodriguez and Arnaldo Santana in a.k.a. Pablo, 1984
- Genre: Sitcom
- Created by: Norman Lear; Rick Mitz
- Starring: Paul Rodriguez; Joe Santos; Katy Jurado; Alma Cuervo; Martha Velez; Arnaldo Santana; Bert Rosario; Maria Richwine; Héctor Elizondo; Edie Marie Rubio; Antonio Torres; Claudia Gonzales; Martha Gonzales; Mario Lopez; Beto Lovato; Michelle Smith
- Country of origin: United States
- Original language: English
- No. of seasons: 1
- No. of episodes: 6

Production
- Executive producers: Norman Lear; Rick Mitz
- Producer: Paul Rodriguez
- Camera setup: Multi-camera
- Running time: 22–24 minutes
- Production company: Embassy Television

Original release
- Network: ABC
- Release: March 6 – April 10, 1984

a.k.a. Pablo is an American sitcom television series starring Paul Rodriguez that aired on ABC from March 6 to April 10, 1984. It was executive produced by Norman Lear.

== Synopsis ==
The series focuses on struggling Hispanic stand-up comic Paul Rivera and his large Mexican American family, who still called him by his given name Pablo. While they supported his career and longed for his success, his traditionalist parents were offended by the ethnic humor he incorporated into his act and urged him to be more respectful of his heritage. Rounding out the boisterous family were his sister Lucia and know-it-all brother-in-law Hector and their five children, his "stuffed shirt" brother Manuel and flirty sister-in-law Carmen and their two children, and his very-anxious-to-wed spinster sister Sylvia. José was Paul/Pablo's slick but inexperienced agent.

The cast included Paul Rodriguez, Joe Santos, Katy Jurado, Héctor Elizondo and Mario Lopez.

The first episode of the ABC series aired on Tuesday, March 6, 1984, at 8:30 p.m. Eastern and Pacific times. The show was cancelled after six broadcasts.

In 2004 TV Guide ranked the series number 45 on its "50 Worst TV Shows of All Time" list.

== Cast ==
- Paul Rodriguez as "Paul" Pablo Rivera
- Joe Santos as Domingo Rivera
- Katy Jurado as Rosa Maria Rivera
- Alma Cuervo as Sylvia Rivera
- Martha Velez as Lucia Rivera Del Gato
- Arnaldo Santana as Hector Del Gato
- Bert Rosario as Manuel Rivera
- Maria Richwine as Carmen Rivera
- Hector Elizondo as José Sanchez/Shapiro
- Edie Marie Rubio as Linda Rivera
- Antonio Torres as Nicholas Rivera
- Claudia Gonzales as Anna Maria Del Gato
- Martha Gonzales as Susana Del Gato
- Mario Lopez as Tomas Del Gato
- Beto Lovato as Mario Del Gato
- Michelle Smith as Elena Del Gato

== Episodes ==
No.	Title	Directed by	Written by	Original release date	Prod. code
1	"Pilot"	Joan Darling	Norman Lear & Rick Mitz	March 6, 1984	101
2	"The Big Mouth"	Joan Darling	Story by : Steven Kunes; Teleplay by : Jack Elinson	March 13, 1984	103
3	"My Son, the Gringo"	Hector Elizondo & Thomas McConnell	Rick Mitz	March 20, 1984	106
4	"The Presidential Joke Teller"	Joan Darling	Jose Rivera	March 27, 1984	104
5	"The Whole Enchilada"	Hector Elizondo & Thomas McConnell	Seth Greenland	April 3, 1984	102
6	"The Woman Who Came to Dinner"	Hector Elizondo & Thomas McConnell	Jose Rivera	April 10, 1984	105

== US television ratings ==
Season	Episodes	Start date	End date	Nielsen rank	Nielsen rating
1983-84	6	March 6, 1984	April 10, 1984	56	14.8
