= Dead Man Out =

1989 American crime film

- VHS cover art
- Genre: Crime; Drama
- Screenplay by: Ron Hutchinson
- Story by: J.D. Maria; Lorna Soroko
- Directed by: Richard Pearce
- Starring: Danny Glover; Rubén Blades; Larry Block; Tom Atkins; Samuel L. Jackson
- Composer: Cliff Eidelman
- Country of origin: United States
- Original language: English

Production
- Executive producers: Robert Cooper; David R. Ginsburg
- Producer: Forrest Murray
- Cinematography: Michel Brault
- Editors: Bruce Cannon; Mia Goldman
- Running time: 87 minutes
- Production companies: Granada Film; Citadel Entertainment; HBO Showcase

Original release
- Network: HBO
- Release: March 12, 1989

Dead Man Out is a 1989 American crime drama television film directed by Richard Pearce and written by Ron Hutchinson. The film stars Rubén Blades as Ben, a death row inmate whose mental state is assessed by psychiatrist Dr Alex Marsh, played by Danny Glover, to determine whether he is competent to face execution. As Marsh attempts to establish a relationship with Ben, he becomes conflicted by the ethics of his responsibility to treat him and the prospect of condemning a man to death. The supporting cast includes Larry Block, Tom Atkins and Samuel L. Jackson.

The film received a generally favorable response from critics, with particular praise for Blades' performance. Danny Glover's portrayal of Marsh and the film's approach towards the ethics of capital punishment also attracted praise. Some reviewers criticized the screenplay and performances.

== Plot ==
Ben, a convicted murderer, has spent eight years on death row following his conviction for killing four people in a diner robbery. During the years of his incarceration, Ben's behavior has become erratic and he shows apparent signs of mental illness. As a prisoner deemed mentally incompetent cannot be executed, psychiatrist Dr Alex Marsh is assigned to assess Ben's mental state and determine whether he is fit to face execution.

Marsh attempts to establish a relationship with Ben, who initially presents as uncommunicative and hostile, to try and understand his psychological condition. Their initial sessions take place with Ben confined to a caged standing cell, while Marsh remains outside the cell. After the initial sessions fail to make progress, Marsh opts to join Ben in the cell, to help gain his trust. Following numerous sessions, Ben eventually begins to open up about his life in prison. As their sessions continue, Marsh encourages Ben to confront his past actions and the consequences of his crimes. As time passes, Marsh comes to realise that his responsibility to assess Ben's mental competency conflicts with his medical duty to treat his patient, as a finding of competency would allow the authorities to proceed with the execution.

During one of their last sessions, held in Ben's own cell during a prison lockdown following the execution of fellow inmate Calvin Fredricks, Marsh suggests that Ben continue feigning mental illness to secure a life sentence in a mental hospital, where he would be spared execution. Ben rejects the idea, telling Marsh he spent a week there previously and would not wish to return. Instead, he threatens Marsh with a blade held to his throat, apparently in a desperate attempt to prolong his incarceration, but withdraws when guards surround the cell. Before Marsh leaves, Ben informs him that a date has been set for his competency hearing.

After being deemed mentally competent for execution, Ben requests a final visit with Marsh. Having already assessed mental competency, Marsh is uncertain why Ben wishes to see him. Ben explains that he never receives visitors, so seeing Marsh in the visiting room is like "being on holiday". The visit also ensures that Marsh must face him after having determined that he is fit for execution. During his subsequent transfer back to his cell, Ben breaks away from the guards, running into the prison yard while Marsh watches on cctv. Ben is fatally shot by the guards, thereby avoiding execution by the state.

== Cast ==
- Danny Glover as Dr. Alex Marsh
- Rubén Blades as Ben
- Larry Block as Kleinfeld
- Tom Atkins as Berger
- Samuel L. Jackson as Calvin Fredricks (credited as Sam Jackson)

== Production ==
The film was produced for HBO Showcase, one of two divisions through which HBO developed television films. The unit's executive producer, Colin Callender, later described it as the "off-Broadway" counterpart to HBO Pictures, explaining that it sought stories not told elsewhere or familiar subjects approached in new ways, with productions intended to entertain while challenging viewers. Film critic John Voorhees felt that the showcase series looked "at aspects of our society", believing the film to be "a worthy addition".

=== Casting ===
==== Rubén Blades ====
Blades became involved with the project after an agent friend presented him with the script, suggesting it was something he should consider. Blades subsequently changed agents to appoint her as his representative. As a law student in the early 1970s, he had visited the prison island of Coiba in Panama to undertake research on repeat offenders.

==== Danny Glover ====
Following his portrayal of Nelson Mandela in the 1987 television film Mandela, Glover said he received the film's script while part way through production of the miniseries Lonesome Dove. He was interested in portraying characters with social consciousness, with particular fascination in the character's moral dilemma, where his professional judgment could determine whether a prisoner lives or dies. He noted that he wanted his work to "stir people". During an interview, he said his attraction to the film was due to its strong character development. In a later 1992 interview with Armond White, he recalled when reading the script for the first time while staying on a houseboat, that he was moved by it in a way he wasn't able to explain.

In preparing for the role of Alex Marsh, Glover spoke with other people who had been in prison to try and better understand prison life. He spent time observing two forensic psychiatrists conduct interviews with three inmates facing the death penalty. He also drew on his own experience of imprisonment, having previously spent two weeks in jail following his arrest during a protest in San Francisco, before being acquitted. Glover expressed being strongly opposed to the death penalty and described being unsettled when overhearing a "maniacal laughter" from one inmate.

=== Filming ===
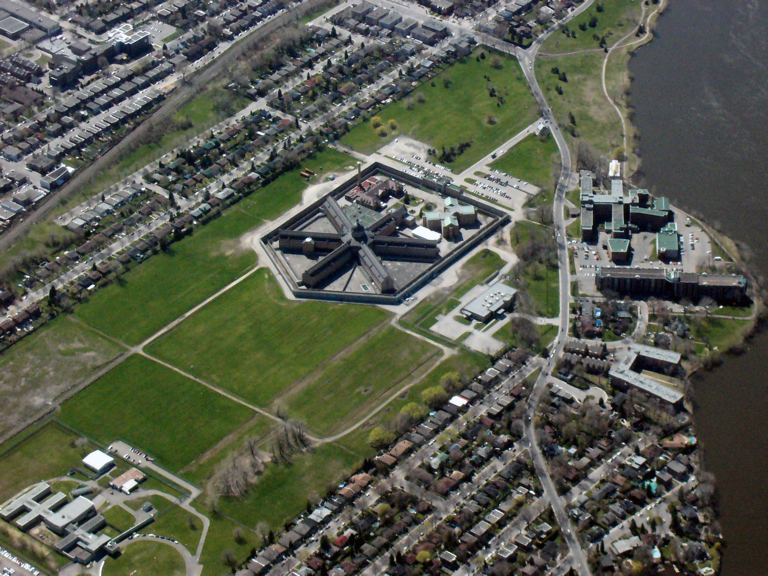
Aerial photograph of the Prison de Bordeaux, pictured in 2006

Producer Forrest Murray opted to film in the operational Bordeaux Prison, also known as the Montreal Detention Centre, in Montreal, Canada, rather than recreating the prison on a soundstage. Discussing his choice, Murray explained wanting to "re-create that harrowing, claustrophobic feeling you get in jail". Permission to film inside the prison was granted by Canadian authorities subject to restrictions, including searches of crew vehicles and prohibiting crew members communicating with inmates. Some scenes were also filmed in a prison located in Laval, Quebec.

Filming inside the prison lasted approximately 20 days. The production encountered interruptions from announcements over the prison's public address system and the noise of inmates. During the shoot, an inmate attempted to escape, while a disturbance in the mess hall was brought under control by guards firing warning shots, which the crew could hear. Some actual prisoners featured as extras. Blades spent much of the daily filming schedule in shackles, which caused chafing on his wrists. Filming took place between August – September 1988, and was reported in October 1988 to have recently concluded under the working title "Dead Man".

=== Music ===
Composer Cliff Eidelman created the score for the film, in what was then only his second credited job. His involvement came after parts of his composition for Magdalena were broadcast on the public radio station KCRW and overheard by a director, who subsequently hired him to compose the score for the film, for which he was nominated for an ACE Award.

=== After filming ===
After filming, Blades described the production as the toughest shoot he had done. He said it had been his first opportunity to portray a character "with an edge", describing Ben as "like a razor blade". Discussing the role during a 2010 interview, Blades reflected on the experience as being difficult, noting that it was the first film role where he felt he "truly had to immerse myself in a character".

Glover expressed that his portrayal of Marsh in an operational prison made him feel deeply affected. Of his character, he said: "My character Alex Marsh comes into this type of situation to get someone well, regardless of what the consequences are, and he is certainly changed by the circumstances he faces". The film's director, Richard Pearce, speaking about Glover's character and the ethics of capital punishment, said: "A lot of people in this country don't actually have to throw the switch. Alex Marsh was unable to live with those blinders in place. He had to accept full moral responsibility".

== Release ==
The film premiered at the 1989 US Film Festival presented by the Sundance Institute on January 26, 1989. June Fenn, from the Sundance Institute, said the film was one of three intended as a mass market commercial film to premiere that year. The film was shown on HBO on March 12, 1989.

== Reception ==
=== Critical response ===
Writing for the New York Magazine, John Leonard described the film as "remarkably taut and provocative", praising Blades' performance as "brilliant" and arguing that he overshadowed Glover. David Parkinson for the Radio Times rated the film 3/5, describing it as a "thought-provoking treatise" and singled out Samuel L. Jackson's "harrowing cameo". Steve White for The Patriot Ledger described the film as "intense and riveting" and similarly praised Blades, calling his performance "marvellous" and "brilliant as the tightly wound condemned man".

Ann Mann for The Stage described the movie as "tough and emotive", feeling that it was a difficult subject to present as a drama. She felt the actors were well cast in their respective roles and gave a special mention to Tom Atkins who played a guard. Other reviewers also highlighted the acting, with Times television columnist John Voorhees noting the "two superb performances" of Glover and Blades and Richard Tedesco of the San Antonio Light saying the acting was "top-notch" in what he described as a "gritty, gutsy drama".

Writing for the media company Knight Ridder, Susan White felt that Glover was "very good as the tight-reined psychiatrist", but had high praise for Blades, whom she thought was "truly spectacular as the scarred prisoner". White believed that despite the movie spending much of its time on character dialogue, she felt the story was "filled with enough suspense to hold almost any viewer's interest". Syndicated columnist Jon Burlingame writing for United Feature Syndicate also praised the film, describing it as being "characterized by sharp writing, effective direction and dynamite acting". Television critic Howard Rosenberg for the Los Angeles Times described the film as "powerful work", praising both Glover and Blades, although felt there was inadequate explanation in the "legal foundation for Marsh's assignment".

John Stark for the People Magazine rated the film a "C-", saying the plot was "minimal" and suggested the film was "done in by colorless performances and a pokey script".

=== Awards and accolades ===
Year	Award	Category	Recipient(s)	Result
1990	ACE Award	Best Actor: Movie or Miniseries	Rubén Blades	Won
1990	ACE Award	Best Writer: Movie or Miniseries	Ron Hutchinson, J. D. Maria, Lorna Soroko	Won
1990	ACE Award	Best Original Score	Cliff Eidelman	Nominated
1990	ACE Award	Dramatic or Theatrical Special	Dead Man Out	Nominated
