= Robert M. Weitman =

American film producer

Robert M. Weitman (1905–1989) was an American film, TV and theatre producer and studio executive. For a number of years he was a leading executive at Metro-Goldwyn-Mayer, being head of production during a successful period in the 1960s under president Robert O'Brien. The two men oversaw the production of the last consistent run of classic films at the studio.

Weitman ran theatres for Paramount in the 1930s and 40s, often booking big bands, In 1953 he went to work for ABC then moved to CBD in 1956. He joined MGM in 1960 and worked in TV production, enjoying success with the Dr Kildare series. He was appointed head of film production in January 1962.

== Head of MGM ==
Weitman oversaw the completion and release of How the West Was Won and Mutiny on the Bounty and the first film of his regime was Unsinkable Molly Brown. In November 1963 he announced 26 projects in development, including The Outrage, 36 Hours, The Only Way to Love with Elvis Presley, a sequel to Flipper, Every Man Should Have One produced by Ted Richmond, A Likely Story with Sophia Loren (this may have become Lady L, Say It With Music from Irving Berlin and Arthur Freed, Quick Before It Melts, The Forty Days of Musa Dagh, Caravans by James Michener (not filmed until 1978), Lies of Silence produced by Ted Richmond, Joy in the Morning produced by Henry Weinstein, The Hank Williams Story produced by Sam Katzman, Dr Zhivago from Carlo Ponti, The Company Girls produced by Joe Pasternak, Too Big for Texas produced by Richmond, Made in Paris produced by Pasternak, The Mask of Dr Fu Manchu produced by Henry Weinstein, The Dirty Dozen (then to be made by the team of Pearlberg and Seaton), The Yellow Rolls Royce, The Last Hill produced by Richard Lyons, The Winning of the Sky produced by Andrew L. Stone (possibly The Secret of My Success), The Ipcress File produced by Harry Saltzman (ultimately made without MGM involvement), Young Cassidy, Lady Chatterley's Lover produced by Lawrence Bachmann and The Beauty Contest produced by Pandro Berman. MGM also expanded its TV production division.

Under Weitman and O'Brien, MGM, which made a $30 million loss in 1963, turned around and made a profit of $17 million the following year. In 1966 they reported a $10 million profit.

MGM became the subject of a corporate take over attempt by Philip Levin in 1967. Weitman resigned from MGM in 1967 and was replaced by Clark Ramsay.

== Columbia ==
Weitman became head of production at Columbia, replacing Mike Frankovich. Although he had a five-year contract Weitman left this post in late 1969, Columbia saying the new filmmaking environment meant his job would no longer exist. Weitman then became an independent producer with an exclusive contract to Columbia, starting with The Anderson Tapes.

== Filmography as producer ==
- The Anderson Tapes (1971) – producer
- Shamus (1973) – producer
- A Matter of Wife... and Death (1975) (TV movie) – producer

== Select filmography as head of MGM ==
=== Films made before Weitman but released when he was in charge ===
- How the West Was Won
- Mutiny on the Bounty
- Flipper

=== Greenlit by Weitman ===
- The Unsinkable Molly Brown (1964)
- The Outrage (1964)
- Sunday in New York (1964)
- The Americanization of Emily (1964)
- The Wheeler-Dealers (1964)
- 36 Hours (1964)
- Flipper's New Adventure (1964)
- Joy in the Morning (1964)
- The Yellow Rolls Royce (1964)
- Your Cheatin' Heart (1964)
- Young Cassidy (1965)
- Lady L (1965)
- The Secret of My Success (1965)
- Dr Zhivago (1965)
- The Glass Bottom Boat (1966)
- The Dirty Dozen (1967)
