= Paul Rodriguez (actor) =

Mexican-American stand-up comedian and actor (born 1955)

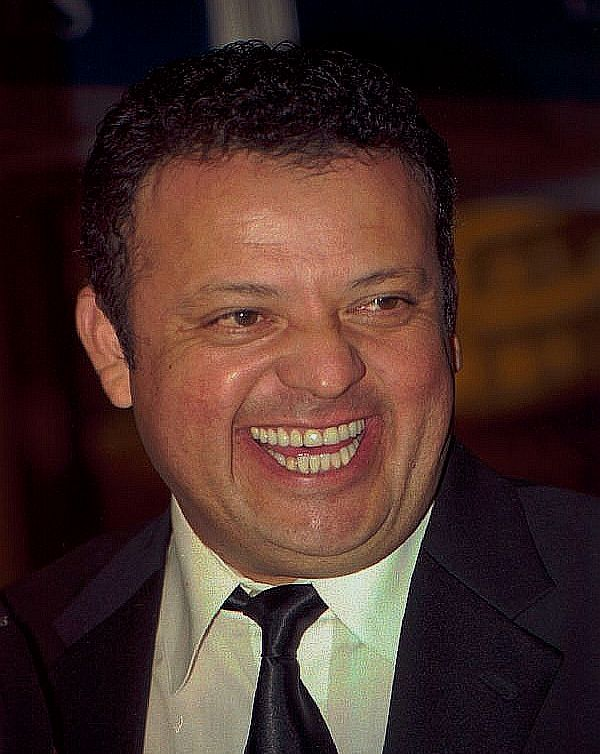
- Rodriguez in 1998
- Born: January 19, 1955 (age 71); Culiacán, Sinaloa, Mexico
- Occupations: Actor, stand-up comedian
- Children: 3, including Paul

Comedy career
- Years active: 1983–present
- Medium: Comedy, film, television
- Genres: Observational comedy, blue comedy, insult comedy, physical comedy, satire
- Subjects: Latin American culture, race relations, family, everyday life, human sexuality

Paul Rodriguez (born January 19, 1955) is a Mexican-American actor and stand-up comedian.

== Early life ==
Paul Rodriguez was born in Culiacán, Sinaloa, to Mexican agriculture ranchers. His family migrated to Compton, California, where Rodriguez enlisted in the United States Air Force and was stationed in Iceland and in Duluth, Minnesota. Rodriguez was first assigned to Lackland AFB after completing training at Sheppard AFB, both in Texas. A1C Rodriguez worked in a Communications Center as a 29130 and had a Top Secret security clearance. He won Tops in Blue. He grew up in the Central Valley of Dinuba California and attended Dinuba High School.

== Career ==
=== Television ===
Rodriguez first appeared in a.k.a. Pablo, a 1984 sitcom produced by Embassy Television for ABC, but the show was canceled after six episodes. He was a regular cast member of the 1988 sitcom Trial and Error, but it was cancelled after only three episodes aired. Later in the same year he replaced Bob Eubanks as host of The Newlywed Game for a season (which was renamed The Newlywed Game Starring Paul Rodriguez and also during his tenure as host, the doo-wop hit "The Book of Love" by The Monotones was used as its theme song). El Show de Paul Rodriguez was on Univision from March 2, 1990, to January 1, 1993.

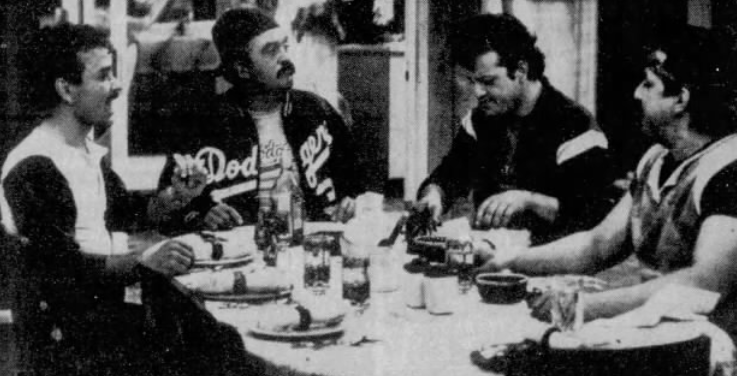
Rodriguez (third in the center) with Bert Rosario, Joe Santos and Arnaldo Santana in a.k.a. Pablo, 1984

From 2010 to 2011, Rodriguez hosted two seasons and 40 episodes of the MTV Tr3́s comedy home video series Mis Videos Locos. The reality show features video footage of Latino people from various countries who are filmed by devices like surveillance cameras and mobile phones.

=== Film ===
Rodriguez has appeared in several feature films, such as The Whoopee Boys with Michael O'Keefe, Denholm Elliott and Marsha Warfield, Blood Work with Clint Eastwood, D.C. Cab, Born in East L.A., Tortilla Soup, Rat Race, and Ali, and has also performed voiceover roles for King of the Hill, Dora the Explorer, and Beverly Hills Chihuahua. Rodriguez has worked in other roles in the film industry: he directed and starred in the film A Million to Juan, and he produced and appeared in the 2002 comedy film The Original Latin Kings of Comedy.

He is often praised for appearing in these films.

In 2009, the stand up Comedy Special Paul Rodriguez: Comedy Rehab, produced and hosted by Rodriguez was released. Paul Rodriguez: Just for the Record, which documents a live performance was released in 2011.

In May 2021, Rodriguez made his debut on A Million Little Things as Gary's Dad. He re-united with Jeff Valdez, creator of the Latino Laugh Festival as host of the second annual HA! Comedy Festival, which will air on HBO Max. According to Deadline Hollywood, he is expected to appear in the dark comedy feature film The Immortalist which was scheduled to be released in November 2021. It also features Franco Nero, Sherilyn Fenn, Aries Spears, and Jeff DuJardin.

== Awards ==
In 2004, Comedy Central ranked him at No. 74 on its list of the "100 Greatest Standups of all Time."

Rodriguez was acknowledged with the "Humanitarian of the Year Award" by the City of Fresno for his work in the area of water conservation.

== Company owner ==
Rodriguez is a part-owner of the Laugh Factory comedy venue in Hollywood, Los Angeles, California, where comedian/actor Michael Richards was filmed in a highly publicized on-stage rant against two black male hecklers. When asked about Richards's repeated use of the word "nigger", Rodriguez said, "Once the word comes out of your mouth and you don't happen to be African American, then you have a whole lot of explaining to do." Rodriguez also has an interest in farming and owns operations in California's Central Valley.

== Charity work ==
Rodriguez is known for his charity work, and many of his comedy specials cover serious issues that are of concern to the Latino community. He has performed for several Comic Relief charity specials and, in 1995, he performed a television special live from San Quentin State Prison. He is the chairman of the California Latino Water Coalition, a group that campaigns to draw attention to California's dire water situation, and he was influential in enacting the California Water Bond Measure.

== Politics ==
Rodriguez has been a vocal and active supporter of the Republican Party. In 2010 he endorsed Republican Meg Whitman during her campaign against Jerry Brown to become governor of California. Rodriguez calls himself a "closeted Republican" but voted for Barack Obama in 2008. He endorsed Republican candidate Mitt Romney during the 2012 presidential election and recorded a radio promotion in Spanish for Romney's campaign. He also collaborated with former governor of California Arnold Schwarzenegger as part of his work with the California Latino Water Coalition. In 2018, Rodriguez announced that he supports many of the policies of Donald Trump.

== Personal life ==
Rodriguez's son Paul Rodriguez (also known as "P-Rod") is a professional skateboarder.

Rodriguez was arrested for drug possession on March 28, 2025, in Burbank, California. He was reportedly "a passenger in a car that was stopped for vehicle code violations" and charged with possession of narcotics. He quickly denied possession of any illicit drug and said the arresting officer slapped him. He was again arrested in Burbank a few months later, again for narcotics possession. He was arrested the night of August 12, 2025, and released the following morning.

Rodriguez is Catholic.

== Discography ==
- 1986: You're in America Now, Speak Spanish
- 1997: Cheese 'n' Macaroni

== Filmography ==
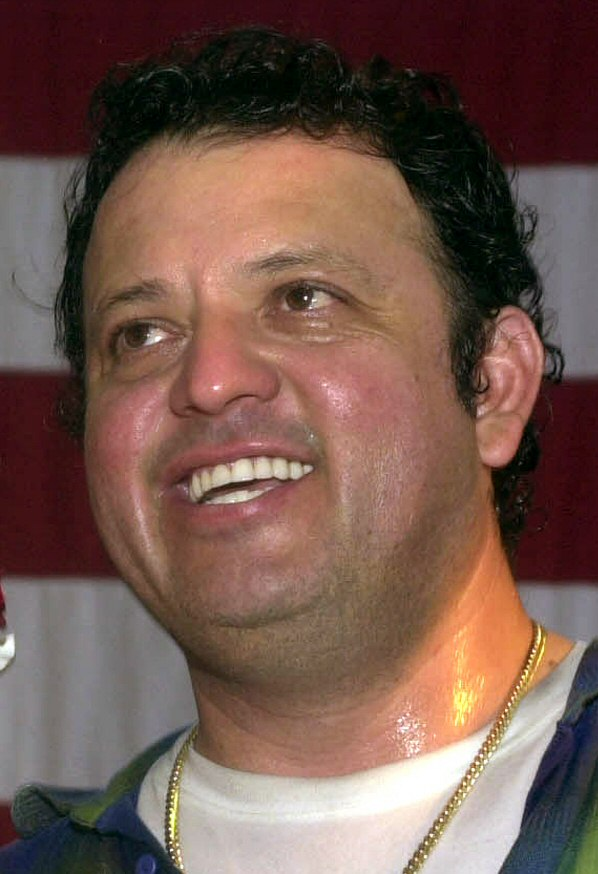
Rodriguez in 2005

Film
Year	Film	Role	Other notes
1983	D.C. Cab	Xavier	
1986	Quicksilver	Hector Rodriguez	
1986	The Whoopee Boys	Barney Benar	
1986	Miracles	Juan	
1987	Born in East L.A.	Javier	
1993	Made in America	Jose	
1994	A Million to Juan	Juan Lopez	Director
1994	Rhythm Thief	Eladio	
1995	Rough Magic	Diego	
1998	Melting Pot	Gustavo Alvarez	
2000	Price of Glory	Pepe	
2000	Mambo Café	Gustavo Alvarez	
2000	G-Men from Hell	Winiford 'Weenie Man'	
2001	Crocodile Dundee in Los Angeles	Diego	
2001	Tortilla Soup	Orlando Castillo	
2001	Rat Race	Gus the Taxi Driver	
2001	The Shipment	Jose Garcia	
2001	Ali	Dr. Ferdie Pacheco	
2002	Blood Work	Det. Ronaldo Arrango	
2002	Back by Midnight	Next Week	
2002	Time Changer	Eddie Martinez	
2003	Chasing Papi	Costas Delgado	Uncredited Role
2003	Baadasssss!	Jose Garcia	
2004	A Cinderella Story	Bobby	
2005	The World's Fastest Indian	Fernando	
2006	Cloud 9	Mr. Wong	
2006	Swap Meet	Councilmen Gonzales	
2006	Holidaze: The Christmas That Almost Didn't Happen	Cupid	Voice Role; Direct-to-Video Release
2007	One Long Night	Poncho	
2008	Vicious Circle	Professor	
2008	Beverly Hills Chihuahua	Chico	Voice Role
2009	Lonely Street	Det. Romero	
2009	Porndogs: The Adventures of Sadie	Bato	Voice Role
2009	The Deported	Ernesto	
2010	Cats & Dogs: The Revenge of Kitty Galore	Crazy Carlito	
2011	Without Men	Camacho	
2016	El Americano: The Movie	El Divino	Voice Role
2017	Pray for Rain	Francisco Reynoso	
2021	Clifford the Big Red Dog	Alonso Sanchez	
2023	Tomorrow's Game	Jorge Robles	

Television
Year	Title	Role	Notes
1980	Norm Crosby's Comedy Shop	Himself	
1983	Gloria	Jerry	Episode: An Uncredited Woman
1984	a.k.a. Pablo	Paul Rivera	6 episodes
1986	Hardesty House		
1986	Tall Tales & Legends	Julio	Episode: Ponce de Leon
1986	The Golden Girls	Ramone	Episode: Vacation
1988	Trial and Error	Tony Rivera	8 episodes (5 unaired)
1988–1989	The Newlywed Game	Himself	
1990	Grand Slam	Pedro Gomez	8 episodes
1991	Hi Honey – I'm Dead	Ralph (The Angel)	TV-Movie
1991	Great Performances	Satanas	Episode: La Pastorela
1995	Live in San Quentin, Paul Rodriguez	Himself	Live TV-Special
1995	The Eddie Files	Construction Worker	Episode: Geometry – Invasion of the Polygons
1995	Touched by an Angel	Ben Rivera	Episode: Trust
1995–1997	Happily Ever After: Fairy Tales for Every Child	Jesse the jester/Gilbert/Tizoc	Episode: Sleeping Beauty/The Fisherman and his Wife/The Shoemaker and the Elves
1996	Latino Laugh Festival	Himself	Live TV-Special
1998	King of the Hill	Jacinto	Episode: Three Days of the Kahndo
2000	Ready to Run	T.J.	Voice Role; TV-Movie
2000–2001	Resurrection Blvd.	Paulie	4 episodes
2002	American Family	Flaco	Episode: Mexican Revolution
2002	Mucha Lucha	El Potrero	Episode: Pinball Wizard
2003	The Twilight Zone	Rosas	Episode: Tagged
2003	The Proud Family	Limo Driver	Voice Role; Episode: Adventures in BeBe-Sitting
2003	Dora the Explorer	Leon, the Circus Lion	Voice Role; Episode: Leon, the Circus Lion
2005	The Buzz on Maggie	Julio's Father	Voice Role; Episode: Lunchlady
2005	Zatch Bell!	Teenager, Various Voices	1 episode
2010–2012	Mis Videos Locos	Himself	40 episodes for MTV Tr3s

== Awards and nominations ==
ALMA Award

- 1999: Nominated, "Outstanding Performance by an Individual or Act in a Variety or Comedy Special" – Comic Relief VIII
- 2002: Nominated, "Outstanding Supporting Actor in a Motion Picture" – Tortilla Soup

Imagen Awards

- 2009: Nominated, "Best Supporting Actor/Feature Film" – Beverly Hills Chihuahua

NCLR Bravo Awards

- 1996: Won, "Outstanding Performance by a Male in a Variety or Music Series/Special" – Latino Laugh Festival
