= Larry Block =

American actor (1942-2012)

- Born: Lawrence Joel Block; October 30, 1942; New York City, New York, U.S.
- Died: October 7, 2012 (aged 69); New York City, New York, U.S.
- Education: University of Rhode Island
- Occupation: Actor
- Years active: 1965–2012
- Spouse: Jolly King (m. 1981)
- Children: 2

Lawrence Joel Block (October 30, 1942 – October 7, 2012) was an American stage, film, television, and radio actor.

== Early life and education ==
Lawrence Joel Block was born in New York City, New York, the son of Sonia (née Kutcher), a travel agent, and Harold Block, who worked in the garment industry. He had a brother, Kenneth.

In 1964, he graduated with a B.A. in English from the University of Rhode Island College of Arts and Sciences.

== Personal life and death ==
Block married Jolly King on September 21, 1981. They had two children, Zachary and Zoe.

He died in New York City, New York on October 7, 2012, at age 69.

== Radio ==
Block appeared frequently on Joe Frank's radio shows.

== Filmography ==
=== Films ===
- Shamus (1973) - Springy
- Slap Shot (1977) - Peterboro Referee
- Heaven Can Wait (1978) - Peters
- Hardcore (1979) - Detective Burrows
- First Family (1980) - Gloria's Secret Service Agent #1
- After Hours (1985) - Taxi Driver
- Cocktail (1988) - Bar Owner
- Robots (1988; direct-to-video) - Julius Enderby
- High Stakes (1989) - Harvey
- Betsy's Wedding (1990) - Barber
- My Blue Heaven (1990) - Defense Attorney
- Big Night (1996) - Man in Restaurant
- Dangerous Proposition (1998) - Dr. Butler
- Isn't She Great (2000) - Herbie
- Bait (2000) - Customer
- Don't Say a Word (2001) - Doorman
- Garmento (2002) - Store Manager
- Book of Danny (2002) - Harry
- Live at Five (2005; short film) - Chef Buddy
- Stealing Martin Lane (2005) - Nigel
- The Guitar (2008) - Mr. Faddis
- Triptosane (2010) - Dr. Ken 'Mecca' Rennet
- Friends and Strangers (2011; short film) - Grandpa

=== Stage ===
- Hail Scrawdyke! (1966)

=== Television ===
- The Secret Storm (1954) - Mickey (1971)
- General Hospital (1963) - Cal Jamison (1978)
- Sesame Street (1971-1972) - Tom
- Kojak (1973) - Gerry Erskine
- A Matter of Wife... and Death (1975) - Springy
- Baretta (1975) - Chemist
- The Lindbergh Kidnapping Case (1976; TV film) - Barney Fayne
- Ellery Queen (1976) - Floor Director
- Police Story (1977) - Carl Cusick
- Delvecchio (1977) - Liquor Store Clerk
- Rosetti and Ryan (1977) - Harry
- M*A*S*H (1977-1978) - Cimoli / Eddie Hendrix
- Charlie's Angels (1978) - Arlo Spinner
- Operation Petticoat (1978) - Bartender
- Space Force (1978; TV pilot) - Private Arnold Fleck
- Barney Miller (1978, episode: Evaluation) - Russell Schuman
- CHiPs (1979) - Abel
- The Last Ride of the Dalton Gang (1979; TV film) - Leroy Keenan
- Ryan's Hope (1981) - Stan Feller
- Miami Vice (1987) - FBI Agent
- Tattingers (1988) - Clerk
- Dead Man Out (1989; TV film) - Kleinfeld
- Family Matters (1989) - Mr. Seeger
- Murphy Brown (1990) - Al Henderson
- Law & Order (1991-2002) - Darryl Moffatt / Stan / Slater / Feldman
- New York Undercover (1996) - Rossmore
- Third Watch (2000) - Helmut Kaiser
- The Job (2001) - Dr. Kline
- Law & Order: Special Victims Unit (2001) - Lonnie
- Law & Order: Criminal Intent (2003) - Frank Kastner
- Smash (2012) - Gary Garrison (final appearance)
