= A Million to Juan =

- VHS artwork
- Directed by: Paul Rodriguez
- Written by: Screenplay: Robert Grasmere; Francisca Matos; Story: Mark Twain
- Produced by: Executive Producers: Mark Amin; Gary Binkow; Producers: Barry L. Collier; Steven Paul
- Starring: Paul Rodriguez; Rubén Blades; Polly Draper; Gerardo; Cheech Marin; Edward James Olmos; Tony Plana; David Rasche; Victor Rivers; Bert Rosario; Pepe Serna; Paul Williams
- Cinematography: Bruce Douglas Johnson
- Edited by: Michael Ripps; Jack Tucker
- Music by: Jeffrey Johnson; Steven Jae Johnson
- Production company: Prism Entertainment Corp.
- Distributed by: The Samuel Goldwyn Company
- Release date: May 15, 1994 (United States)
- Running time: 98 minutes
- Country: United States
- Language: English

A Million to Juan is a 1994 romantic comedy film starring comedian Paul Rodriguez. It was also his directorial debut. The story is a modern spin on Mark Twain's 1893 story "The Million Pound Bank Note".

== Plot ==
Alejandro Lopez narrates the events of his father Juan Lopez's life, and how by selling oranges he changed their lives.

A man named Juan is born on a strawberry field in Bakersfield, California, but due to hardship, his mother decided to relocate to Mexico. As an undocumented citizen (due to no proof of US citizenship), Juan struggles in Los Angeles not only to get a green card, but to care solely for Alejandro after Juan's wife's death.

Juan sells oranges near a freeway. He lives with two roommates and his young son. He loves to cook and feed them creative meals as he tries desperately to raise Alejandro. He is stressed as he battles landlords and immigration.

One afternoon, a stranger in a limousine finds Juan, on the street corner, broke. The wealthy stranger realizes the situation and quietly hands to Juan a check for $1 million, but under the condition that he must give back all the money in one month. Juan is suspicious and shows the check to Olivia Smith, his son's social worker, who encourages him to follow the directions given him. Instead, he is encouraged by his brothers to use the check to get credit extended to them at several posh Hollywood clothing stores, an exotic car dealership, and more.

Juan comes to learn that Olivia is a woman in a difficult and likely dead-end relationship with a bossy businessman who cares little if nothing about her and the lives of the poor, particularly the less educated Hispanics living and working, doing unskilled work in Metro Los Angeles. The good-natured Juan Lopez struggles to avoid temptations and the greedy people that who have suddenly popped-up in his life suddenly. Juan strikes up a romantic relationship with Olivia and attempts to take out a loan for a restaurant using the check as collateral, although this falls through. The mysterious stranger, clad in white, makes an appearance and lingers just long enough to encourage Juan to follow his dreams.

Unfortunately, the millionaire experience begins to wane, ending with an embarrassing repossession of the luxury sports car and the removal of the expensive wardrobe. Juan and his brothers are seen shortly thereafter, garbed in their plain and ordinary street clothes; the only thing left are the clothes on their backs. Olivia rejects Juan in favor of the practical but unhappy relationship with her arrogant boyfriend, and sadly informs Juan that he will soon be deported.

Juan is soon back on the Los Angeles street corner near the highway, selling plastic bags of oranges from a small shopping cart. The stranger appears again, and from his limousine, hands Juan another envelope which contains a piece of paper with a simple address in Central Los Angeles. The stranger tells Juan to go there, and that what comes next will be up to him. Depressed, Juan tells the stranger his earlier efforts brought only unhappiness and disappointment to this life.

Later that afternoon, a convertible drives up and stops near Juan, requesting a bag of oranges. It's Olivia, who declares her love for Juan, and the two share a passionate kiss. Moments later, they realize a billboard is calling Juan out by name and directing him to a specific address, which turns out to be a severely dilapidated building bearing real estate papers on the door placing it under Juan's ownership. Juan's friends and family pull together to restore the building and turn it into a highly successful restaurant, dubbed "The Angel Cafe." Juan and Olivia are soon married, living in a lavish house with their loved ones, and expecting a baby girl they decide to call Esperanza, meaning hope.

The final shot of the film sees the white clad angel standing outside of the family house, gaze turned heavenward, before departing down a street and disappearing into the light.

== Cast ==
- Paul Rodriguez as Juan Lopez
- Tony Plana as Jorge
- Bert Rosario as Alvaro
- Polly Draper as Olivia Smith
- Larry Linville as Richard Dickerson
- Maria Rangel as Anita
- Evelina Fernández as Mrs. Gonzales
- David Rasche as Jeff
- Edward James Olmos as The Angel
- Pepe Serna as Mr. Ortiz
- Gerardo Mejía as Flaco
- Victor Rivers as Hector Delgado
- Liz Torres as Mrs. Delgado
- Paul Williams as Jenkins
- Cheech Marin as Shell Shock
- Rubén Blades as Bartender
- Jean Kasem as Party Guest

== Reception ==
=== Critical response ===
The staff at Variety magazine gave the film a mixed review, writing, "The odds of A Million to Juan breaking out of its inherent niche-market appeal can be summed up in its title. This gentle rags-to-riches tale set in the Los Angeles barrio is a good-natured parable that, unfortunately, doesn't pack much commercial punch. Its positive intentions aren't enough to cross over into the mainstream...While Rodriguez adheres to the movie dictum of happy endings, his mix of message/mirth is too soft and mushy to reach a contemporary crowd."

Film critic Marc Savlov also gave the film a mixed review, writing, "...comedian Paul Rodriguez has taken a laudable step in the right direction with his directorial debut. Unfortunately, it's no masterpiece...Rodriguez's comic sensibilities are usually razor-keen, but here, blunted by a cliché-riddled storyline and scattershot direction, they seem nonexistent.

Bob Strauss, a critic for Los Angeles Daily News, listed the film as the year's third worst on his year-end list.

=== Box office ===
The film opened on May 15, 1994, in the United States on a limited release.

After one week, the film went to home video. Box-office sales the only week in circulation were $381,457 in 181 theatres. However, IMDb reports $1,221,832 in box-office receipts.

== Soundtrack ==
A Latino-themed original soundtrack was released on June 14, 1994, on the RMM Records & Video label, an independent Latin music record company based in New York City. The album contains 14 tracks. Performers include Celia Cruz, Marc Anthony, Aramis Camilo, Marcos Loya, Carla De Leon, John Pena, John Saldano, Carl Hatem and others.

== See also ==
- The Million Pound Note (1953) film starring Gregory Peck.
