= Joe Santos =

American actor (1931–2016)

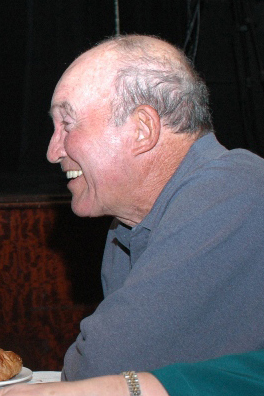
- Santos in 2009
- Born: Joseph John Minieri Jr. June 9, 1931; New York City, New York, U.S.
- Died: March 18, 2016 (aged 84); Santa Monica, California, U.S.
- Education: Fordham University
- Occupation: Actor
- Years active: 1963–2010
- Spouse: Maria Montero (m. 1958; died 1988)
- Partner: Nancy Hobson
- Children: 3, including Perry Santos
- Relatives: Daniel Santos (step-father); Joseph W. Sarno (cousin)

Joseph John Santos (née Minieri Jr.; June 9, 1931 – March 18, 2016) was an American actor. He was best known for his role as Police Sgt. (later Lt.) Dennis Becker on the NBC television series The Rockford Files (1974–80), which earned him a Primetime Emmy Award nomination for Outstanding Supporting Actor in a Drama Series.

== Early life and education ==
Santos was born Joseph Minieri Jr. to Italian American parents in Brooklyn on June 9, 1931. He was born the same day his father died. His mother Rose (née Sarno), sold olive oil and eventually became a nightclub owner and singer in New York City and Havana. She later married Puerto Rican singer Daniel Santos, and Joe took his name. Santos' cousin was sexploitation filmmaker Joseph W. Sarno, who would go on to give him some of his earliest film roles.

During the Korean War, Santos served in the United States Army. He was a football player at Fordham University, and even turned semi-pro, before finding a new avenue in acting. He struggled in show business, and worked blue-collar jobs until his friend Al Pacino helped him get a role in the 1971 movie The Panic in Needle Park.

== Career ==
=== Film ===
Santos had roles in a number of notable films of the early 1970s, including The Panic in Needle Park (1971), The Gang That Couldn't Shoot Straight (1971), as the leader of a slave-catching posse in the western The Legend of Nigger Charley (1972), Shaft's Big Score! (1972), as a policeman in Shamus (1973), The Friends of Eddie Coyle (1973), The Don Is Dead (1973), Blade (1973) and Zandy's Bride (1974).

More than two decades later he appeared in the big budget Kevin Costner flop, The Postman (1997).

=== Television ===
From 1974 to 1980, Santos played LAPD Sergeant (later Lieutenant) Dennis Becker, the friend of the easy-going private investigator Jim Rockford (played by James Garner) in The Rockford Files. The role earned him an Emmy nomination for Outstanding Supporting Actor in a Drama Series in 1979. He reprised the Dennis Becker role in eight The Rockford Files television movies (1994-1999).

He portrayed Lt. Frank Harper in the TV series Hardcastle and McCormick (1985–86).

Santos appeared in various television movies during the 1970s and 1980s, including Nightside (1973), The Blue Knight (1973), The Girl on the Late, Late Show (1974), A Matter of Wife... and Death (1975), Power (1980), The Hustler of Muscle Beach (1980), The Selling of Vince D'Angelo (1983), and The Ratings Game (1984). His character was often a police detective or lieutenant. He portrayed Marty Sinatra, Frank's father, in the four-part 1992 television miniseries Sinatra.

In 1980, Santos played Norman Davis in the short-lived (10 episodes) NBC comedy Me and Maxx. In 1984, he portrayed Domingo Rivera on the ABC comedy a.k.a. Pablo, which was cancelled after six episodes.

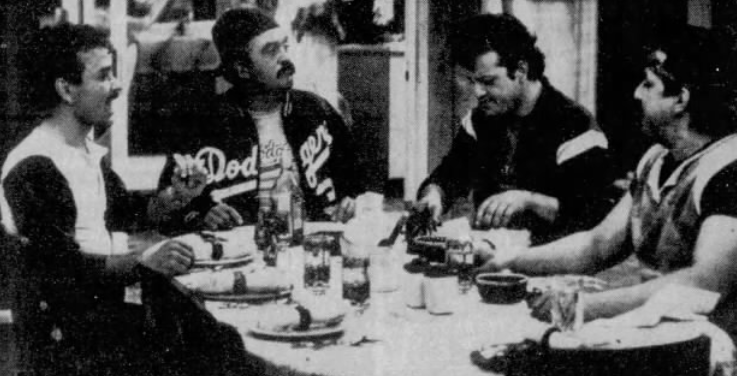
Santos (second in the center) with Bert Rosario, Paul Rodriguez and Arnaldo Santana in a.k.a. Pablo, 1984

Santos made guest appearances on television shows throughout his acting career, including Room 222, Toma, Barnaby Jones, The Streets of San Francisco, Kung Fu, Baretta, Lou Grant, Police Story (in 8 episodes), Black Sheep Squadron, Trapper John, M.D. , The Greatest American Hero, Hill Street Blues (in 3 episodes), The A-Team, Remington Steele, T. J. Hooker, Hardcastle and McCormick (in 10 episodes), MacGyver (in 2 episodes), Magnum P.I. (in 5 episodes), Murder, She Wrote (in 2 episodes), Miami Vice, Quantum Leap, Santa Barbara (in 5 episodes), Hunter (in 2 episodes), and NYPD Blue.

From 1978 to 1980 he appeared on the CBS game show Match Game, always sitting in the top left seat.

Santos also appeared on The Sopranos as Angelo Garepe in seven 2004 episodes.

== Personal life ==
In 1958, Santos met and married Maria Montero while he was in Cuba. They were married 30 years until her death in 1988.

=== Death ===
Santos died in Santa Monica, California on March 18, 2016, two days after suffering a heart attack at the age of 84.

== Filmography ==
=== Film ===
Year	Title	Role	Notes
1964	Warm Nights and Hot Pleasures	Dick	Directed by his cousin, Joe Sarno
1964	Flesh and Lace	Julian Shop Owner	Directed by his cousin, Joe Sarno
1966	Moonlighting Wives	Det. Hank	Directed by his cousin, Joe Sarno
1967	The Tiger Makes Out	Man At Housing Authority	Uncredited
1967	My Body Hungers	Truck Driver	Also directed by Sarno
1968	The Detective	Reporter	Uncredited
1971	The Panic in Needle Park	Det. DiBono	
1971	The Gang That Couldn't Shoot Straight	Ezmo	
1972	The Legend of Nigger Charley	Reverend	
1972	Shaft's Big Score!	Pascal	
1973	Shamus	Lt. Promuto	
1973	The Friends of Eddie Coyle	Artie Van	
1973	The Don Is Dead	Joe Lucci	
1973	Blade	Spinelli	
1974	Zandy's Bride	Frank Gallo	
1983	Blue Thunder	Montoya	
1984	Fear City	Frank	
1986	The Education of Allison Tate	Det. Duncan	
1989	Beverly Hills Brats	'Spyder'	
1990	Revenge	Ibarra	
1991	The Last Boy Scout	Lt. Ben Bessalo	
1992	Mo' Money	Lt. Raymond Walsh	
1994	Trial by Jury	Johnny Verona	
1994	Art Deco Detective	Det. Guy Lean	
1997	The Postman	Colonel Getty	
1998	The Right Way	Paulie Rizzo	
2000	Auggie Rose	Emanuel	
2000	Hammerlock	Warden Stan Cromwell	
2001	Proximity	Clive Plummer	
2001	The Man from Elysian Fields	Domenico	
2009	Baseline	Bashir Abu Ahmed	
2010	Dead Genesis	Jason	
2015	Chronic	Isaac Sr.	

=== Television ===
- 1972: Room 222 — Season 4 Episode 6 "The Imposter" as Manny Galvez
- 1973: The Blue Knight — Sgt. Cruz Segovia
- 1973: Police Story Season 1 Episodes 12 - 13 "Countdown" — Det. Sally Pickel
- 1974: Kung Fu Season 3 Episode 52 "A Lamb to the Slaughter" — Señor Sanjero
- 1974–80: The Rockford Files — Sgt. (later Lt. in Season 5) Becker (recurring), also in 8 subsequent TV-movies (1994–99)
- 1975: A Matter of Wife... and Death — Lt. Promuto
- 1978: Black Sheep Squadron — CPO Miller Timmons (one episode)
- 1978-80: Match Game — Himself (multiple episodes)
- 1980: Me and Maxx — Norman Davis
- 1983: The Greatest American Hero — Season 3 Episode 8 "Space Ranger" as Henry Fletchner
- 1984: a.k.a. Pablo — Domingo Rivera (6 Episodes)
- 1984: Remington Steele — Alf Nussman
- 1984 Hunter - Season 1 Episode 3 "The Hot Grounder" as Det. Ortega
- 1985–86: Hardcastle and McCormick — Lt. Frank Harper
- 1986–87: MacGyver — Jimmy 'The Eraser' Kendall (two episodes)
- 1987: Murder She Wrote — Episode "The Bottom Line Is Murder" — Joe Rinaldi
- 1986–88: Magnum, P.I. — Police Lt. Nolan (five episodes)
- 1988: Miami Vice — Oscar Carrere (one episode)
- 1989: Quantum Leap — Tony La Palma (one episode)
- 1990: Sinatra — Marty Sinatra
- 1990: Hunter — Season 7 Episode 10 "La Familia" as Ernesto/Grandpa
- 1990: The Old Man and the Sea — Lopez
- 1993: NYPD Blue — Angelo Marino (2 episodes)
- 2004: The Sopranos — Consigliere Angelo Garepe (seven episodes)

== Awards and nominations ==
Ceremony	Category	Work	Result	Ref.
31st Primetime Emmy Awards	Outstanding Supporting Actor in a Drama Series	The Rockford Files	Nominated	
