= Martha Veléz =

American singer-actor

Martha Velez-Reid
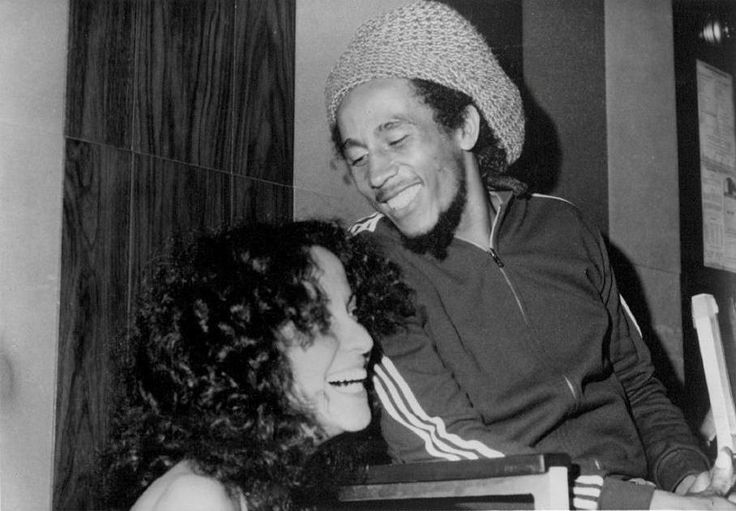
- Velez (left) and Bob Marley
- Born: Martha Veléz; August 25, 1945 (age 80); New York City
- Occupations: Television actress, singer
- Spouse(s): Keith Johnson (married 1968 - 1982), James N. Reid (married 2003 - present)

Martha Veléz (born in New York City on August 25, 1945) is an American singer and actress of Puerto Rican descent.

== Biography ==
Veléz started singing at age five and won an opera scholarship at age 12, as a mezzo-soprano. She studied for three years, then went to the High School of Performing Arts in New York City. Veléz holds a master's degree from Antioch University in Clinical Psychology and a Ph.D. from Pacifica Graduate Institute in Cultural Mythology and Depth Psychology. She is a founding Fellow of the Imaginal Institute of Ojai, California. As a playwright, she wrote the award-winning play Power of the Powerless. Veléz is interested in using her voice as a means for social change.

Veléz began her recording career with the folk singing group The Gaslight Singers on Mercury Records. She was the female singer with Earl Mann, Al Alcabes, and Jeff Hyman.

Veléz released her debut blues-rock album Fiends and Angels on the Sire/Blue Horizon Records label in 1969. Backing musicians included Eric Clapton, Stan Webb (Chicken Shack), and Paul Kossoff (Free) on guitar, Christine McVie (Fleetwood Mac) on keyboards, Jack Bruce on bass, Mitch Mitchell (The Jimi Hendrix Experience) on drums, and Brian Auger on organ. The album was produced by Mike Vernon.

1972 saw the release of Veléz's second album, Hypnotized. In 1973, she released Matinée Weepers, a collection of adult-contemporary pop.

In May 1975, Veléz traveled to Jamaica for three weeks to record with reggae artist Bob Marley. She is the only American artist for whom Marley functioned as a music producer — the results were Escape from Babylon. Producer Craig Leon also contributed to this association. He asked Marley about doing the album with her; Marley listened to her composition, "Living Outside the Law" from her 1972 album, Hypnotized, and felt a philosophical kinship. He also was impressed by her voice. Marley's positive response took them into the studio with his earlier producer Lee "Scratch" Perry to work on producing Escape from Babylon, released in 1976. The album also featured four Marley covers (Bend Down Low, Happiness, There You Are, Get Up, Stand Up) and a Veléz-Marley composing collaboration, Disco Night. The songwriting credits were given to Rita Marley because of Marley's dispute with his publishers at the time.

After Escape from Babylon, Veléz only released one more album: American Heartbeat (1977). A compilation, Angels of the Future Past, was released in 1989. This did not include any songs from Hypnotized (due to cross-licensing issues) or from American Heartbeat (because the masters were missing at the time). Veléz resumed her acting career, which began with playing the lead in Hair on Broadway. She moved on to acting in movies and TV series. Veléz was a series regular in the Norman Lear sitcom a.k.a. Pablo in 1984, and played a recurring role in Falcon Crest (1986). In 1997, she acted in One Eight Seven along with Samuel L. Jackson. Veléz also worked in films with Julianne Moore (Safe), Halle Berry and Patrick Swayze (Father Hood), Dennis Hopper (Nails), and played a lead role in the (Sundance) winner Star Maps, directed by Miguel Arteta and produced by Mathew Greenfield.

== Personal life ==
In 2003, Veléz married Juliard violist and symphonic performer James Reid.

She is also the former wife of trumpet player Keith Johnson. Her son Taj Johnson is a performance artist, writer-poet, and singer. Taj appeared as a series regular for two years on Parker Lewis Can't Lose.

Her brother is the percussionist Gerardo Velez, who has worked with Spyro Gyra, Patti LaBelle, Jimi Hendrix and Van Morrison.

== Discography ==
- The Gaslight Singers (1963)
- Turning it on (1964)
- Fiends and Angels (1969)
- Hypnotized (1972)
- Matinée Weepers (1973)
- Escape from Babylon (1976)
- American Heartbeat (1977)
- Angels of the Future Past (1989)

== Filmography ==
- a.k.a. Pablo (1984) (Norman Lear TV series)
- E/R (1984)
- MacGruder and Loud (1985)
- Faerie Tale Theatre (1986)
- Shattered If Your Kid's on Drugs (1986)
- Falcon Crest (1989) (TV series)
- L.A. Law (1989)
- Side Out (1990)
- Tour of Duty (1990) (TV series)
- Live! From Death Row (1992)
- Nails (1992) (television film)
- Father Hood (1993)
- Safe (1995)
- Star Maps (1997)
- One Eight Seven (1997)

== Theater ==
- Mata Hari (1965) (Washington, D.C. National Theater)
- I'm Solomon (1966)
- Hair (1967) (Broadway - Biltmore Theater)
- Comedy of Errors - Shakespeare (Los Angeles)
- Power of the Powerless (1994) (Los Angeles, CA)
