= Louis W. Sauer =

American pediatric immunologist

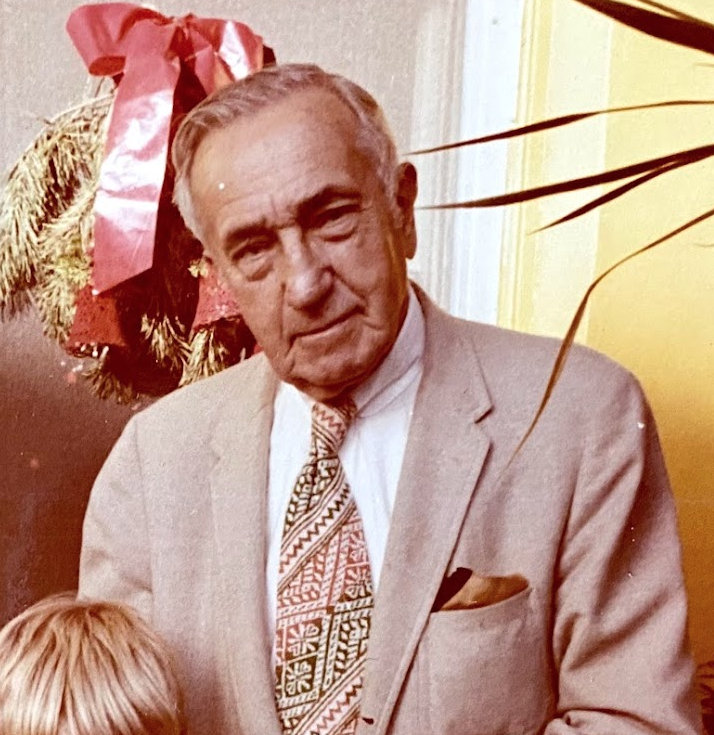
- Born: August 13, 1885; Cincinnati, Ohio
- Died: February 10, 1980 (aged 94); Coral Gables, Florida
- Education: University of Chicago
- Spouse: Lucia Mira Seypelt (m. 1912)

Louis Wendlin Sauer (August 13, 1885 – February 10, 1980) was an American pediatrician who became known for perfecting the vaccine used to prevent pertussis (whooping cough), saving countless lives around the world.

== Biography ==
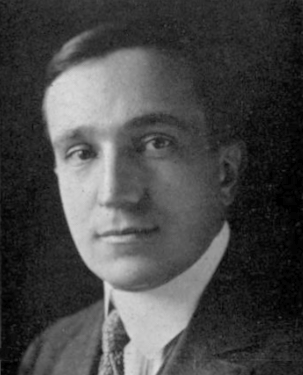
c. 1922

Louis W. Sauer was born in Cincinnati on August 13, 1885. He married Lucia Mira Seypelt on August 20, 1912 in Berlin, while attending school there. He graduated from Rush Medical College in 1913 and began working in pediatrics.

Sauer established a practice at Evanston Hospital, in Evanston, a suburb of Chicago, Illinois. He earned an MD in Berlin, and his PhD at the University of Chicago.

After five years of work, Dr. Sauer developed the vaccine in 1931, inoculating children against pertussis, a respiratory infection that had been the most fatal disease for children under two years old. He later developed the DPT vaccine, which allowed the vaccines for diphtheria, pertussis and tetanus to be administered as a single injection. Dr. Sauer never asked for compensation for developing vaccines and told an interviewer later, "One doesn't do that thing for money."

Dr. Sauer was a professor at the Northwestern University Medical School in Evanston, Illinois, until his retirement in 1959 to Coral Gables, Florida. He died at age 94 of pneumonia and congestive heart failure.
