= Maria Richwine =

Colombian-born American actress (1952–2024)

- Born: María Eugenia Agudelo; June 22, 1952; Cali, Colombia
- Died: March 12, 2024 (aged 71); Palm Springs, California, U.S.
- Occupations: Actress; Playboy Bunny
- Years active: 1978–2024
- Known for: The Buddy Holly Story a.k.a. Pablo

Maria Richwine (born María Eugenia Agudelo; June 22, 1952 – March 12, 2024) was a Colombian-born American actress who was also the first Latina Playboy Bunny.

Her first film role was as Buddy Holly's wife Maria, in the 1978 biopic movie The Buddy Holly Story. Her performance received positive reviews. Newsweek critic David Ansen commented, "Her attractive performance suggests complexities of character that the script fails to explore." She was a regular on Norman Lear's 1984 series a.k.a. Pablo, and also appeared in the television series Three's Company, Sledge Hammer!, and Freddy's Nightmares.

On March 12, 2024, Richwine was found unresponsive in a hot tub, at a residence in Palm Springs, California, and was later pronounced dead. She was 71.

== Filmography ==
=== Film ===
Year	Title	Role	Notes
1978	The Buddy Holly Story	Maria Elena Holly	
1982	Desire	Cris Arias	
1986	Hamburger: The Motion Picture	Conchita	
1989	Ministry of Vengeance	Fatima	action thriller film

=== Television ===
Year	Title	Role	Notes
1979	A Man Called Sloane	Maria Casal	Episode: "Samurai"
1982	Three's Company	Maria Gomez	Episode: "Cousin, Cuisine"
1984	a.k.a. Pablo	Carmen Rivera	6 episodes
1984	Hardcastle and McCormick		Episode: "Hate the Picture, Love the Frame"
1990	Freddy's Nightmares	Violet Rodriguez	Episode: "Prisoner of Love"
2015	East Los High	Veggie	Episode: "Valentine's Day"
