= Alex Reymundo =

Mexican-American Comedian, Number Juan Tequila President, and actor

- Born: Acapulco, Mexico
- Notable work: Co-Owner with Ron White, President, Face of Number Juan Tequila
- Spouse: Terri Ray Reymundo
- Children: 2

Comedy career
- Medium: Stand-up comedy, television, film
- Genre: Comedy
- Subjects: Mexican American culture, race relations, human sexuality, family, friends, everyday life
- Website: AlexReymundo.com

Alex Reymundo is a Mexican-American comedian and actor who was featured on the 2007 ALMA Awards.

== Filmography ==
Film

- 2002 The Movement, a television movie, as Officer Torez
- 2003 El matador, as Juan Carlos Sr.
- 2007 Permanent Vacation, as Alex Garcia

Television

- 2010 Latino 101, as himself

Video games

- 2006 Cars, voice actor

El Guapo

Stand up

- 2002 The Original Latin Kings of Comedy, as himself
- 2007 Hick-Spanic: Live in Albuquerque, as himself
- 2007 The Payaso Comedy Slam, as himself, Host, and Producer
- 2009 Red-Nexican, as himself
- 2011 Ron White's Salute to the Troops, as himself
