= Louis F. Polk Jr. =

American businessman

Louis F. "Bo" Polk Jr. (born c. 1930) is an American businessman who was briefly president of MGM.

== Biography ==
Polk had studied engineering at Yale and had an MBA from Harvard. He joined General Mills in Minneapolis in 1960, working as financial controller and director, instigating rapid change, becoming a youth-conscious organization with a growing group of young managers and closing almost half of their mills and diversifying into other businesses such as Parker Brothers and Play-Doh. He had no previous involvement in movie making but he had impressed Edgar Bronfman, Sr. then the major shareholder in MGM. There was opposition to his appointment within MGM but he was elected as a director in December 1968 and named president in January 1969. Polk replaced Robert O'Brien. He was greeted with reports of MGM incurring a loss of $2.5 million for the first financial quarter. Polk said he became interested in making the film after watching Blow Up. He hired Harvard MBAs to work as executive assistants at the studio and appointed Herbert F. Solow as head of production.

During the year it became apparent MGM would record a loss of $19 million. Polk and Solow decided to drop a number of projects to which MGM had the rights, including Rosencrantz and Guilderstern are Dead, The Homecoming, Baker Street and the musical Say It with Music.

The following films were announced under Polk's regime:

- False Witness
- The Magic Garden of Stanley Sweetheart
- The Moonshine War
- The Strawberry Statement
- The Adventures of Augie March directed by Noel Black
- Man's Fate to be directed by Fred Zinnemann
- She Loves Me directed by Blake Edwards and starring Julie Andrews – adapted from The Shop Around the Corner
- The Ballad of Dingus McGee
- Tai Pan from the novel by James Clavell starring Patrick McGoohan

Augie March, Man's Fate, Tai Pan and She Loves Me were all cancelled and Dingus McGee was made later. There were also several TV series made at the studio: The Courtship of Eddie's Father, Then Came Bronson and Medical Center.

Polk lasted less than a year in the job. Kirk Kerkorian moved to control the company and eventually succeeded. When he did so he put James T. Aubrey as president. Following Polk's resignation MGM reported a $35 million loss, as opposed to the predicted $19 million. Polk then sued MGM and Kerkorian for $4 million.
