= Anna Wilmarth Ickes =

American politician and activist

Member of the Illinois House of Representatives
- In office 1929–1935

Anna Wilmarth Thompson Ickes (January 27, 1873 – August 31, 1935) was an American politician and activist.

== Early life ==
Born Anna Hawes Wilmarth in Chicago, Illinois, in 1873 to Henry Martin Wilmarth (1836–1885), a manufacturer and organizer of the First National Bank of Chicago, and Mary Jane (Hawes) Wilmarth (1837–1919), a civic and reform leader, Wilmarth went to South Division High School and to the University of Chicago. Ickes was influenced by her mother, a progressive women's activist and colleague of Jane Addams and Ellen Gates Starr.

== Career ==
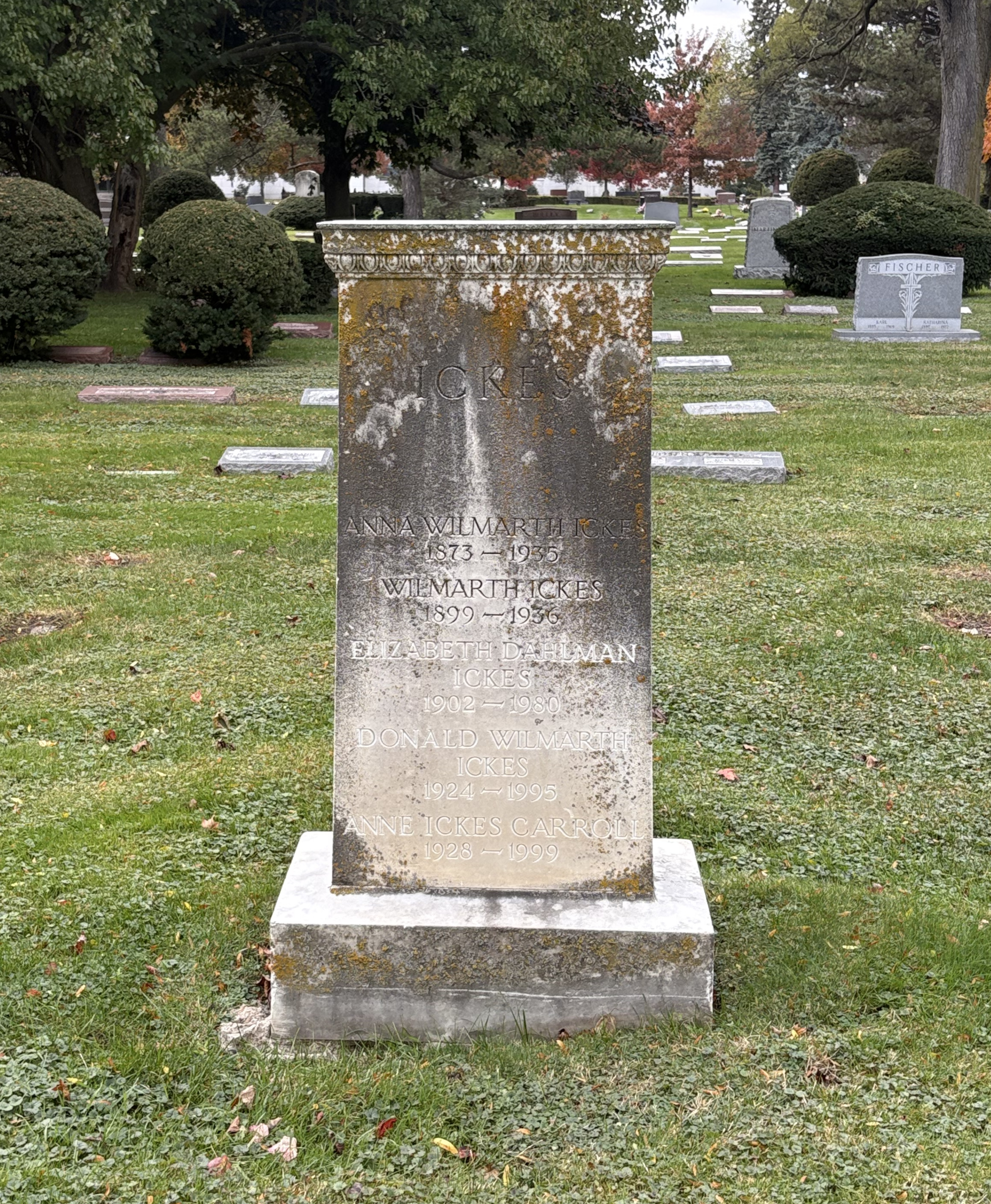
Ickes's grave at Memorial Park Cemetery, Skokie

In 1897, she married James Westfall Thompson (1869–1941), an instructor at the University of Chicago; they were divorced in 1909. On September 16, 1911, she married Harold L. Ickes, an attorney who would later become U.S. Secretary of the Interior, serving from 1933 to 1946.

Anna Ickes supported the Women's Trade Union League and the Hull House in Chicago. In 1912, Ickes and her husband Harold supported the Progressive Party. In 1920, they supported James M. Cox, the Democratic nominee, for President of the United States. From 1924 to 1929, Anna Ickes served on the University of Illinois Board of Trustees.

Ickes belonged to the City Club of Chicago and the Chicago Woman's Club, who endorsed her candidacy for the Illinois House of Representatives. She won and served for three terms, as a Republican, from 1929 to 1935.

In 1933, Ickes wrote a book, Mesa Land, about Native Americans. In 1935, on a trip to study the customs and ceremonies of the Navajo and the Pueblo peoples, she was killed in an automobile accident in Velarde, New Mexico. She was buried at Memorial Park Cemetery in Skokie, Illinois.
