= Robert O'Brien (executive) =

American film executive (1907–1997)

Robert H. O'Brien (1904–1997) was an American businessman and Hollywood executive who was president of Metro-Goldwyn-Mayer during the 1960s.

O'Brien was a financial officer at Paramount Pictures for ten years, including treasurer of United Paramount Theatres and financial vice-president of American Broadcasting-Paramount Theatres. He joined MGM in 1957 as vice-president and treasurer and was promoted to executive vice-president. He took over the position of president in the wake of the debacle of Mutiny on the Bounty (1962). Under O'Brien's regime, in partnership with head of production Robert M. Weitman, MGM produced its last run of classic films, including Dr Zhivago (1965), The Dirty Dozen (1967) and 2001: A Space Odyssey (1968).

A series of flop films such as The Shoes of the Fisherman and Ice Station Zebra saw him removed from his position as president in 1969. He was replaced by Louis F. Polk Jr. and was instead appointed chairman.

In May 1969 as MGM was headed towards a $6 million loss for the first half of the year, O'Brien resigned as chairman and was replaced by Edgar Bronfman, Sr., the largest shareholder of MGM.

== Awards ==
- 1965 – Pioneer of the Year (Motion Picture Pioneers Assn)
- 1966 – humanitarian awards from both the March of Dimes and the Anti-Defamation League
