= Timecop (disambiguation) =

Timecop may refer to:

- Timecop (franchise), a series of works relating to a police officer working with time travel, including:
  - Timecop, a 1994 film starring Jean-Claude Van Damme
  - Timecop (comics), a comic published in 1992 and 1994
  - Timecop (TV series), an ABC TV series which first aired in 1997
  - Timecop (video game), a 1995 SNES video game
- "Time Cops", a storyline in the science fiction comedy webtoon series Live with Yourself!
