= Timecop (franchise) =

American science fiction franchise

Timecop franchise
- Cover of Timecop comic book that originated the franchise.
- Created by: Mike Richardson; Mark Verheiden
- Original work: "Time Cop: A Man Out of Time" (comic book)
- Owners: Dark Horse Comics; Films and TV series: Universal Pictures (Versant)

Print publications
- Novel(s): The Scavenger (1998); Viper’s Spawn (1998); Blood Ties (1999)
- Comics: Timecop

Films and television
- Film(s): Timecop (1994); Timecop 2: The Berlin Decision (2003); Timecop (TBA)
- Television series: Timecop

Games
- Traditional: Timecop (SNES)

Timecop is an American science fiction franchise about a police force that regulates time travel, set in the near future. It started as a three-part story titled "Time Cop: A Man Out of Time" in a 1992 Dark Horse anthology comic, which inspired the 1994 film Timecop starring Jean-Claude Van Damme. The film was a box office success and inspired a video game for SNES, a single-season ABC TV series, three novels, and a film sequel in 2003.

== Films ==
=== Timecop (1994) ===
The film adaptation of "Time Cop: A Man Out of Time" was directed by Peter Hyams and produced by Sam Raimi and Moshe Diamant. Jean-Claude Van Damme played police officer Max Walker who is recruited by the Time Enforcement Commission (TEC) in 1994 to bring a rogue politician, Senator Aaron McComb (Ron Silver), to justice. Through his investigation, Walker discovers that the senator is also responsible for numerous other previously unconnected crimes, including the earlier death of his wife, played by Mia Sara.

=== Timecop 2: The Berlin Decision (2003) ===
Timecop 2 was directed by Steve Boyum and written by Gary Scott Thompson. Van Damme did not return—the lead role was instead fulfilled by Jason Scott Lee. Lee plays TEC agent Ryan Chung, who has to stop Brandon Miller, the head of an agency supervising TEC, who intends to change history by assassinating Adolf Hitler in 1940. The film was released in 2003 directly to home video.

=== Future ===
In 2014, The Hollywood Reporter wrote that Universal Studios was developing a reboot of Timecop due to the success of the 2012 time travelling film Looper. Richardson was to be the executive producer. Universal was reportedly throwing into development a remake of Timecop, the 1994 Jean-Claude Van Damme time travel action movie.

Marc Shmuger would produce the film via his Universal-based Global Produce banner alongside Tom McNulty.

It is still unclear whether the reboot is still in development.

== Television ==
=== Timecop (1997–1998) ===
Following the film's success, American Broadcasting Company ordered a series based on Timecop. They agreed to produce 13 episodes on a $15 million budget. Universal Television produced the resulting series, using the same title as the film. Mark Verheiden wrote the screenplay for the pilot.

The show was first aired in 1997. None of the cast or characters from the film reprised their roles in the series. Ted King starred in a breakout role as TEC agent Jack Logan (a character later used in the novels) who hunts down rogue travelers and brings them to justice before they can alter the past. Due to low ratings and poor advertising, the series was cut short after less than a season, and only nine out of the thirteen episodes were aired.

== Other media ==
=== Comics ===
Mike Richardson, the founder of Dark Horse Comics, wrote a three-issue story titled "Time Cop: A Man Out of Time". The story was included in issues No. 1–3 of the Dark Horse Comics anthology series in 1992. Richardson developed the story, while the comic was written by Mark Verheiden and drawn by Ron Randall. The plot of the comic differs from film's plot, but Max Walker is the protagonist of both works.

Richardson and Verheiden went on to write the screenplay for the film. They also published a two-issue comic book adaptation of the film in September 1994, coinciding with the film's release.

=== Novels ===
S.D. Perry wrote a novelization of the original Universal Pictures Timecop film in 1994.

Dan Parkinson wrote an adventure trilogy based on the Timecop series, covering Jack Logan's further hunts for rogue time travelers who try to alter the past. Published by Del Rey Books, the trilogy consisted of Viper's Spawn (August 1998), The Scavenger (September 1998), and Blood Ties (March 1999).

The first book in the trilogy, Viper's Spawn, follows Jack Logan as he finds out the Nazis have discovered new time travel technologies and are disrupting the timeline by altering the past. Jack is then tasked with hunting down and investigating the current situation. This leads him to many threats and adventures through time as he battles enemies from many different timelines ranging from pirates, slavers, and the kingpin threat Viper's Nest.

The second book, The Scavenger, follows Jack Logan on another adventure as this time the treat to the timeline is a thief who has access to time travel technology and is stealing from different points in time. Jack peruses the thief in different time periods such as the 1945 B-25 bomber incident, and the Old West.

The final book in the Jack Logan trilogy follows Jack as he is informed that there are criminals traveling back in time to alter key moments in history, with the criminals targeting Stalin and Franklin D. Roosevelt. Among the midst of the other threats, Jack finds out that he himself is being erased from history, where no one has any memory of him.

=== Video games ===
A side-scrolling action game based on the Timecop film was produced by Cryo Interactive for Super Nintendo Entertainment System in 1995. The game is notable for being one of the first to use digitized images of the film's cast to portray game characters—live actors had been filmed in front of a bluescreen. The player has to stop Dr. Hans Kleindast, the inventor of time travel, following him through various time periods throughout the game's 15 levels.

Although the game was only released for the Super NES, a version was also developed for the Sega CD, with a short demo being distributed with the May 1995 issue of the European Sega Pro magazine. Despite being fully completed by the developer, JVC Musical Industries choose not to publish the Sega CD version. In 2007, a complete version of the game was eventually released on the Internet by the Sega CD version coder.
