= Timecop 2: The Berlin Decision =

2003 American direct-to-video film

- DVD cover
- Directed by: Steve Boyum
- Written by: Gary Scott Thompson
- Based on: Timecop by: Mike Richardson; Mark Verheiden
- Produced by: Mike Elliott
- Starring: Jason Scott Lee; Thomas Ian Griffith
- Cinematography: Crescenzo Notarile
- Edited by: Craig Bassett
- Music by: Andy Gray
- Production companies: Universal Pictures; Dark Horse Entertainment; Capital Arts Entertainment
- Distributed by: Universal Studios Home Video
- Release date: September 30, 2003
- Running time: 78 minutes
- Country: United States
- Language: English

Timecop 2: The Berlin Decision (also known as Timecop: The Berlin Decision, and Timecop 2) is a 2003 American direct-to-video cyberpunk science fiction action film directed by Steve Boyum. The film is based on the comic book of the same name by Mike Richardson and Mark Verheiden, and is a sequel to 1994's Timecop starring Jean-Claude Van Damme. The film stars Jason Scott Lee, with a supporting cast of Thomas Ian Griffith, Mary Page Keller and John Beck. The film was released on DVD and VHS in the United States on September 30, 2003. It is the second installment in the Timecop film series. The film introduces new characters and takes place twenty one years after the previous film.

== Plot ==
In 2025, time travel technology has improved considerably; Time Enforcement Commission (TEC), the agency that monitors time travel, is still keeping the past safe and after the events of the previous film, Society for Historical Authenticity (SHA) is established to ensure that TEC personnel do not alter history. However, the Society's leader, Brandon Miller, believes he has the responsibility to change history based on a "moral obligation to right the wrongs of the past" and plans to do so by traveling back to Berlin in 1940 and kill Adolf Hitler. TEC agent Ryan Chang is sent back to stop him, but in the resulting fight, Miller's wife, Sasha, part of the SHA, ends up dead. Miller is imprisoned in the World Penitentiary for trying to change history, and Ryan Chang begins arresting Miller's close Society friends. In Atlantic City in 1895, Ryan prevents SHA member Frank Knight from robbing Andrew Carnegie. Knight accuses the TEC of being murderers when they execute him. Ryan is haunted by memories of when his father, Josh, died of a brain aneurysm in 2002. Josh was lecturing about time travel at the University of Southern California, and had a heated debate on the morals of altering history.

TEC agent Douglas illegally makes physical contact with his younger self and they are suddenly merged, causing the agent to wink out of existence. Without the agent ever existing, a key Brandon Miller associate isn't arrested and Miller is able to leave prison on a technicality. Miller sets out to eliminate every TEC operative by traveling back in time and killing their ancestors, making it as if the agents never existed. Miller could then change history with impunity since there wasn't anyone to stop him. Eventually, Ryan is the only agent left and he has to stop Miller.

Ryan fights his way through rioters at the World Penitentiary, killing an inmate with a grudge against him on his way to confront Miller, but is unable to convince him that what he wants to do is wrong. Back in his present time, Ryan finds changes to history; Doc is more irascible because her husband was "killed in the war". When he returns to the World Penitentiary, Miller was never there at all. Ryan, becoming less and less capable of surviving all these time jumps, returns to 2025 again. This time, the world is even more different due to Miller's interference: Ryan's parents were "killed in the war", Doc has been executed for trying to save her husband and O'Rourke wears an eye patch and has never heard of Hitler.

Ryan is issued a tracker that enables him to follow Miller by jumping into the wake of his time leaps. He is sent to 1881 and prevents Miller from killing an ancestor named Jason in Springfield, Texas, then chases him to 1929 where he saves a Frances in a Chinese restaurant. In a nightclub in 1988, Ryan is embarrassed to see his young parents disco dancing and lures Miller away from them. Miller shoots Ryan, but the bullet is stopped by the pocket watch that his father bequeathed to him. Returning to his own era, where things are mostly back to normal, he realizes that his father died when Miller tried to kill Ryan at age 11. Barely surviving another time leap, Ryan goes to the University of Southern California on 7 May 2002.

The student who disagreed with Josh was a young Brandon Miller. Josh tries to stop the older Miller from killing Ryan, but is killed by one of Miller's weapons that induces brain aneurysms. The older Ryan intervenes, threatening to erase Miller's existence by killing his younger self. The older Miller taunts Ryan by accusing him of hypocritically being willing to change history. He provokes him into a fight, watched by the younger Miller, younger Ryan and his mother, and Sasha. When Ryan has Miller at his mercy, he tells the younger Miller that “it doesn’t have to be this way. You can change all this.” Ryan and Miller then disappear, suggesting that the younger Miller changed his mind. In 2025, Ryan's colleagues who were erased by Miller are back, although Doc still refuses to date Timecops and Ryan appears to retain his memories of the changes Miller made.

== Cast ==
- Jason Scott Lee as TEC Agent Ryan Chang
- Thomas Ian Griffith as Brandon Miller
- Mary Page Keller as "Doc"
- John Beck as Director O'Rourke
- Tava Smiley as TEC Agent Tyler Jeffers
- Josh Hammond as Michael Travis
- Tricia Barry as Sasha Miller
- Wen Yann Shih as Cyndi Chan
- Kenneth Choi as Professor Josh Chan
- Toshi Toda as Sushwel, Japanese Diplomat
- Pete Antico as Frank Knight
- Ken Lally as Schultz
- Peter Dykstra as Tony Banks
- Sven-Ole Thorsen as SS Bodyguard
- Jonathan Klein as Jonathon Hanley
- Neil Dickson as Neil Johnson
- Joe Sabatino as Sergeant O'Hera
- Mike Upton as Douglas
- Marty Murray as Broderick Lynwood
- Izzy Assencas as Jackson
- April Fissell as Rose Anderson / Francis Chan
- Robert Carradine as Jim "Big Jim"

== Reception ==
=== Critical response ===
Writing in Ain't It Cool News, Scott Foy said, "Honestly, I can't decide whether to recommend the movie or not. I swear there are moments in this movie where you want to laugh and bang your head against the wall out of frustration at the same time." BeyondHollywood.com wrote, "So shut off your brain and enjoy the ride. Timecop 2 is definitely better than the first, even if it still doesn’t make a lick of sense."
