= Pentamedia Graphics =

Indian software and digital media company

- Type: Animation
- Industry: Animation
- Fate: Defunct
- Website: www.pentamedia.in

Pentamedia Graphics, formerly known as Pentafour Software, is an Indian software and digital media company based in Chennai, Tamil Nadu. The main activities are projects, products, consultancy and training in software and digital media.

Pandavas: The Five Warriors received the National Film Award for Best Feature Film in English in 2000.Alibaba, Son of Aladdin (released as Mustafa and the Magician), The Legend of Buddha and Gulliver's Travel were submitted for the Academy Award for Best Animated Feature, but were not able to get a nomination.

== Animated feature films ==
Year	Title	Director(s)	Notes
2000	Sinbad: Beyond the Veil of Mists	Alan Jacobs; Evan Ricks	co-produced with Improvision Corporation; First feature length computer animation film created exclusively using Motion Capture
2000	Pandavas: The Five Warriors	Usha Ganesarajah	National Film Award for Best Feature Film in English
2002	Alibaba	Usha Ganesarajah	co-produced with Ivory Films
2003	Son of Alladin	Singeetam Srinivasa Rao	International title Mustafa & the Magician
2004	The Legend of Buddha	Shamboo S. Phalke	co-produced with the Economic Development Board of Singapore
2005	Gulliver's Travel	Anita Udeep	Alternate title Gulliver and the Lilliputs
2008	Jai Vigneshwara	James Cliford	

== Films produced under Media Dreams ==
Media Dreams was set up in 1997 as an Indian entertainment business unit catering to the television, theatre and the internet. It was acquired by Pentamedia Graphics in December 2000. The group's key partners included prominent writer Sujatha as its managing director.

- Bharathi (2000)
- Nila Kaalam (2001)
- Pandavar Bhoomi (2001)
- Krishna Krishna (2001)
- Little John (2001)
- Pammal K. Sambandam (2002)
- Whistle (2003)

== Films produced under Pentamedia ==
- Knock Knock, I'm Looking to Marry (2003) (coproduction with N-Viz Entertainment)

== Special effects in live-action films ==
Year	Film	Language	Notes
1998	Jeans	Tamil	
1999	Monisha En Monalisa	Tamil	
1999	Padayappa	Tamil	
1999	Kadhalar Dhinam	Tamil	
1999	Hindustan Ki Kasam	Hindi	
1999	Mudhalvan	Tamil	
2000	Bharathi	Tamil	
2000	Raju Chacha	Hindi	
2001	Mrugaraju	Telugu	
2001	Nila Kaalam	Tamil	
2001	Little John	Tamil	
2001	Citizen	Tamil	
2001	Pandavar Bhoomi	Tamil	
2001	Nayak: The Real Hero	Hindi	Remake of Mudhalvan
2002	Pammal K. Sambandam	Tamil	
2003	Whistle	Tamil	
2004	Anji	Telugu	
2004	Ghilli	Tamil	
2004	Naani	Telugu	
2004	New	Tamil	
2004	Arjun	Telugu	
2004	M. Kumaran S/O Mahalakshmi	Tamil	
2009	Kulir 100°	Tamil	

== Computer animation in animated films ==
- The King and I (1999)

== See also ==
- Crest Animation Studios, its major Indian competitor
- Future Thought Productions
- Hanuman (2005 film)
- Indian animation industry
- List of Indian animated feature films
