= Charles Evered =

American writer

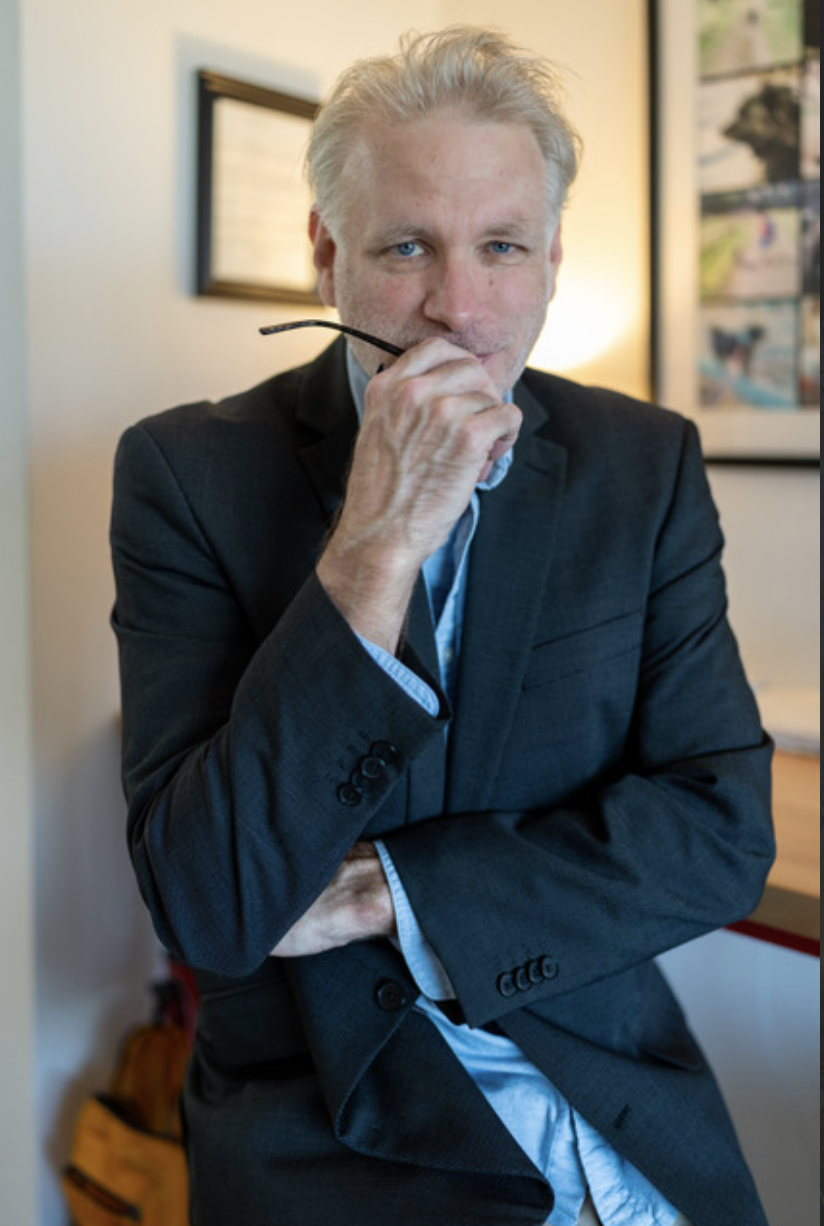
- Charles in London, 2025
- Born: November 12, 1964 (age 61); Passaic, New Jersey, U.S.
- Education: Rutgers University–Newark; Yale University (MFA)
- Occupations: Playwright; Screenwriter; Film Director
- Website: charlesevered.com

Charles Evered (born November 12, 1964) is an American-born playwright, screenwriter and film director.

Born in Passaic, New Jersey, Evered grew up in Rutherford, New Jersey, the fifth child of Marie (née Cole) and Charles J. Evered.

Evered took his undergraduate degree from Rutgers-Newark and an MFA from Yale University, where he studied with director George Roy Hill. He has won several awards for his writing including the Crawford Award, the Berrilla Kerr Award, the Alfred P. Sloan Fellowship at the Manhattan Theatre Club, the Chesterfield/Amblin Fellowship, (Sponsored by Steven Spielberg's Amblin Entertainment), the Edward Albee/William Flanagan Fellowship, the Bert Linder Fellowship and the Lucas Artist Fellowship at the Millay Colony.

His plays include Running Funny, (premiere at Williamstown Theatre Festival featured Paul Giamatti), Billy and Dago, (Actors Studio—NYC) premiere featured Scott Cohen, The Size of the World, (Yale Repertory premiere featured Liev Schreiber, Circle Repertory Company—NYC premiere featured Rita Moreno and Frank Whaley, directed by Austin Pendleton), The Shoreham, (LA premiere featured Eric Stoltz), directed by Matt Shakman, Adopt a Sailor, (Town Hall—NYC premiere featured Sam Waterston, Eli Wallach and Neil Patrick Harris), (subsequently performed in all fifty states), Celadine, (premiere featured Amy Irving) and Class, (premiere featured Thaao Penghlis and Heather Matarazzo). His plays have been published by Broadway Play Publishing, Samuel French and Smith and Kraus among others. Additional plays include: Traces, Wilderness of Mirrors, Bridewell, Ted's Head, Clouds Hill, Looking Again, (“Best Ten Minute Plays 2012”, Smith and Kraus) and Ten.

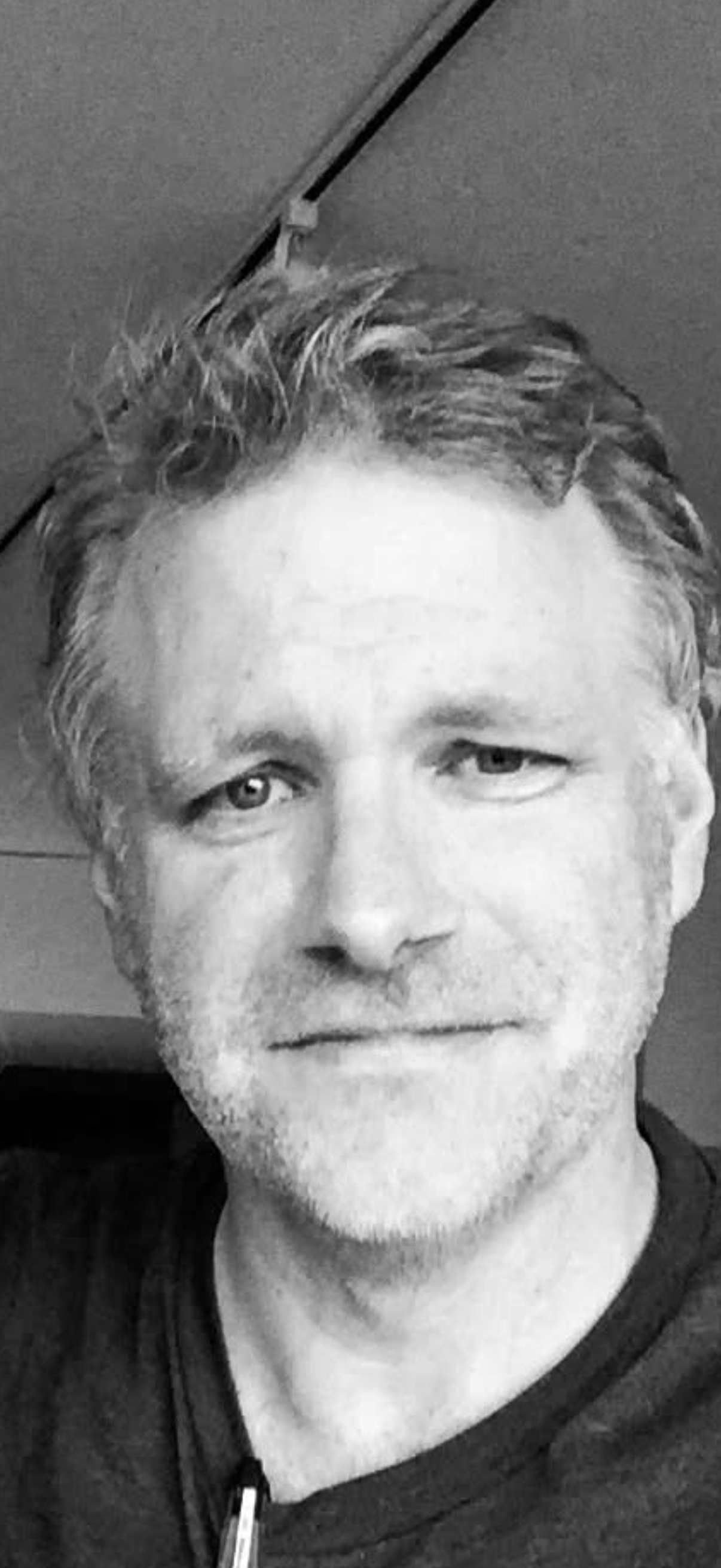
Charles Evered in 2015

He has written screenplays and teleplays for studios and companies such as Arthur Hiller's Golden Quill, Universal Pictures, NBC, Steven Spielberg's DreamWorks Pictures and Paramount Pictures. His produced film and television credits include an episode of Monk entitled “Mr. Monk and the Leper” for USA Network, starring Tony Shalhoub. Evered wrote and directed the feature film Adopt a Sailor, starring Peter Coyote, Bebe Neuwirth and Ethan Peck. Adopt a Sailor was an official selection at more than twenty national and international film festivals, premiering on Showtime. His play Running Funny was also adapted for the screen, directed by Anthony Grippa Jr, and he wrote and directed the short film Visiting, which premiered at the Palm Springs International Film Festival. His second feature film as a director, A Thousand Cuts, starred Michael O'Keefe and was nominated for a Saturn Award by the Academy of Science Fiction, Fantasy and Horror Films. It was distributed by Kino Lorber. Evered's most recent film, Out, starred Gloria LeRoy and had its world premiere at the Newport Beach Film Festival. His play, Knock, Knock, premiered in London at Theatre503 in 2014. His newest play, An Actor's Carol, which he directed, premiered in December 2015 starring Tony winner Hal Linden and was nominated for eight Desert League Awards, winning the Bill Groves Award for “Outstanding Original Writing.” He is a lifetime member of the Writers Guild of America and has taught or guest lectured at Yale University, Carnegie Mellon University, Whitman College, Emerson College and the University of California where he was conferred emeritus status. In 2023, his plays were added to the Permanent Public History Collection at the Massachusetts Historical Society. In 2024, he was named Artist in Residence at the George Washington Birthplace National Monument in Colonial Beach, Virginia. Also in 2024, a collection titled "Charles Evered, Fourteen Short Plays and Monologues," covering forty years of his writing, (1984–2024), was published by Sahara Flight.

In 2025, he was a Research Fellow at the American Revolution Institute at the Society of the Cincinnati in Washington, D.C.

In 2026, he was named Playwright in Residence at the newly formed Ear Out Playhouse in Tribeca, New York City. His play Class will have its Manhattan premiere at the playhouse in November of that year.

Evered served in the United States Navy Reserve for eight years, reaching the rank of Lieutenant. He is a member of the Yale Veterans Association. His play Adopt a Sailor toured to all fifty states in support of the Evered House, a non-profit he formed in honor of his father Charles J. Evered, who served in World War II. He splits his time between Shenandoah, Virginia, and Princeton, New Jersey.

== Plays ==
- Running Funny (with Paul Giamatti and Nick Brooks, 1988)
- Billy and Dago (with William Francis McGuire, Peter Gregory, Scott Cohen, Damian Young, etc., 1989)
- The Size of the World (with Sean Cullen and Liev Schreiber, 1990/1)
- Traces (with Sean Haberle, 1990)
- The Shoreham (with Eric Stoltz, 2001)
- Bridewell (2002)
- Visiting, (2002)
- Adopt a Sailor (ten-minute version, with Sam Waterston, Bebe Neuwirth, Eli Wallach, etc., 2002)
- Wilderness of Mirrors (2003) published by Broadway Play Publishing Inc.
- Clouds Hill (2004) published by Broadway Play Publishing Inc.
- Celadine (with Amy Irving, 2004) published by Broadway Play Publishing Inc.
- Ted's Head (2004)
- Adopt a Sailor (Full length version) (2005) published by Broadway Play Publishing Inc.
- Boston (2008)
- Looking Again (2009)
- Ten (2011)
- Class (2013) published by Broadway Play Publishing Inc.
- Knock Knock (2014) London premiere.
- An Actor's Carol (2015)
- Mel and Stu (2024)
- Walk In (2024)
- Tenure or Bust (2024)

== Publications ==
- The Size of the World and Other Plays, Billings/Morris Ltd. 1997. ISBN 978-1-57502-670-1
- The Shoreham and Other Plays, Blue Moon Press. 2002.
- Wilderness of Mirrors, Broadway Play Publishing, Inc. 2004. ISBN 978-0-88145-233-4
- Clouds Hill, Broadway Play Publishing, Inc. 2004. ISBN 978-0-88145-257-0
- Celadine, Broadway Play Publishing, Inc. 2005. ISBN 978-0-88145-283-9
- Adopt A Sailor, Broadway Play Publishing, Inc. 2007. ISBN 978-0-88145-343-0
- Class, Broadway Play Publishing, Inc. 2010. ISBN 978-0-88145-477-2
- An Actor’s Carol, Broadway Play Publishing, Inc. 2019. ISBN 978-0-88145-827-5
- Fourteen Plays and Monologues, 1984 - 2024, Sahara Flight, 2024. ISBN 978-1-962849-18-0
