= Nancy Archer =

Nancy Archer may refer to:

- Nancy Fowler Archer, a character from the 1958 film Attack of the 50 Foot Woman
- Nancy Cobb Archer, a character in the 1993 film Attack of the 50 Ft. Woman
