= Alan Jacobs (filmmaker) =

American film director

- Born: Tappan, New York, United States
- Occupations: director, screenwriter and producer
- Notable work: Nina Takes a Lover (1994), American Gun (2002), Down for Life (2009).

Alan Jacobs is an American independent film director, screenwriter and producer, best known for his films Nina Takes a Lover (1994) and Down for Life (2009).

Born in Tappan, New York, Jacobs' career began at Apple Inc., where he was the in-house filmmaker. Jacobs is a graduate of Wesleyan University and the Stanford Business School.

In 1994, his first feature, Nina Takes a Lover (1994), was accepted at the Toronto International Film Festival and the Sundance Film Festival, where it was purchased and distributed by Columbia Pictures. His follow-up films included Just One Night (2000), Sinbad: Beyond the Veil of Mists (2000), and American Gun (2002).

In 2021, the US Congressional Hispanic Caucus nominated his 2009 film Down for Life, the story of a Los Angeles teenager seeking to escape gang life, for inclusion in the National Film Registry.

== Early life and career ==
Jacobs was born to Sara and Bernard Jacobs, in Tappan, New York. Sara was an interior designer and Bernard was a cameraman and television editor. Jacobs attended Tappan Zee High School, in Orangeburg, New York. He then studied writing and literature at Wesleyan University and later received an MBA from the Stanford Business School.

After graduation, he began his career at Apple Inc., where he was the in-house filmmaker. Jacobs left Apple in 1991 in his mid-20s, before which he had almost no interest in movies. That year he wrote the screenplays for two movies based in San Francisco, California: Nina Takes a Lover and Just One Night (then titled SFO).

== Nina Takes a Lover (1994) ==
His first feature, Nina Takes a Lover (1994), was an independent film that Jacobs wrote, directed and produced for $600,000. The film features a young woman who retells the story of an affair she had when she felt that the romance had disappeared from her marriage. At the movie's end, the viewer learns that the affair was an elaborate sexual roleplay with her actual husband. Jacobs funded the film in part with help from his former classmates at Stanford's Graduate School of Business.

From the beginning, Jacobs wanted Laura San Giacomo to play the main character, Nina, but his first casting directors refused to pursue her, saying that San Giacomo was too big a star. Jacobs fired them and hired a new casting director, Rick Pagano, who agreed to help. San Giacomo loved the screenplay and agreed to join the movie for the Screen Actors Guild minimum rate. Paul Rhys, Fisher Stevens, and Michael O'Keefe also joined the production, with Rhys playing the eponymous lover of the title.

Both the Sundance Film Festival and the Toronto International Film Festival accepted the film. At Sundance, the film was a nominee for the Grand Jury Prize in the Dramatic category. Columbia Pictures bought the rights to Nina Takes a Lover and distributed it theatrically.

On general release, Nina Takes a Lover received mixed reviews. On Rotten Tomatoes, the film has an approval rating of 50% based on 6 critics' reviews.

Todd McCarthy of Variety called it "a wisp of a film that leaves no indelible impression save a general attractiveness and civilized sensibility." Roger Ebert praised the acting and said the two leads "generate authentic chemistry," but said he "felt vaguely cheated and empty" when the movie concluded. Stephen Holden of The New York Times wrote that the film "aspires to be a gently amused evocation of sexual boredom within marriage. It even offers a novel solution to the problem. But its characters are hopelessly shallow, evasive and charmless, the perfect targets for confirmed yuppie-bashers."

TV Guide said "San Francisco's charm is well used" and the film makes it seem "like the most romantic city on earth." David Armstrong of the San Francisco Chronicle wrote that while the film's twist ending didn't feel convincing, Alan Jacobs "coaxes warm yet wary performances from his actors" and "has a good ear for how lovers talk - the shyly revealed secrets, the shared code words - and a strong sense of the way newly intimate strangers peel away layers of defense, their own and the other person's." Mick LaSalle, also of the San Francisco Chronicle, called it "a nice little picture" that showed a non-tourist side of San Francisco and gave Jacobs "a good track record".

== Early 2000s ==
Following the release of Nina Takes a Lover, the San Francisco Chronicle reported that Jacobs was working on a picture called SFO starring Timothy Hutton, again set in San Francisco. Unlike in Nina Takes a Lover, Jacobs focused on more touristy-y aspects of the city in his shooting, since Hutton's protagonist was from out of town. The picture also included appearances from San Francisco notables Don Novello (a comedian) and Mayor Willie Brown.

In 2000, the picture was released under the title Just One Night. It is a screwball comedy about the crazy exploits of an earnest groom-to-be (Timothy Hutton) who seeks his lost shoe all over the city with the help of an unhappily married woman (Maria Grazia Cucinotta).

Also in 2000, Jacobs co-directed the Indian-US animated co-production Sinbad: Beyond the Veil of Mists with Evan Ricks. It was the first full-length animated movie ever created solely from the motion capture process. The movie tells the story of Sinbad the Sailor, best known from One Thousand and One Nights, as he seeks the ingredients for a magic potion to save the life of a king. The film starred Brendan Fraser as Sinbad, with Leonard Nimoy and Mark Hamill in supporting roles.

Moria Reviews described some of the film's early scenes as "uninvolving" and that the film's limited technology came out "looking like a Pixar test reel." However, the reviewer also praised the film's "conceptual wildness of animation" and the more exciting adventure scenes in its second half, such as a sequence with a giant robotic manta ray. Jeff Vice for Deseret News said that the technology looked "more like a video game than a movie" and disliked the acting and screenplay, though he also praised the "imaginative production design".

In 2002, Miramax Films released Jacob's next film, American Gun (2002), which he wrote and directed. Starring James Coburn, Virginia Madsen, and Barbara Bain, the film tells interwoven stories centering on a fatal shooting. It would be Coburn's final screen appearance. Critics generally praised Coburn's lead role, with Andrew Wright of The Portland Mercury writing, "Coburn is the whole show [here]."

Jacobs' directing and screenplay drew a variety of reactions. David Hunter of The Hollywood Reporter wrote that Jacobs was "getting a lot of quality cinema out of a tight budget" and praised the "risky" storytelling, while David Nusair at Reel Film Reviews called it a "mostly engaging and intriguing character study". However, Chris Hewitt of the St. Paul Pioneer Press criticized the film's "anti-gun message, warm family drama … and its fake-out structure."

== Down for Life (2009) ==
In 2009, Jacobs released his next film, Down for Life, a docudrama chronicling the true story of Lesly Castillo, a Hispanic teenage girl who was a gang leader in South Central Los Angeles. Castillo's story gained nationwide attention in 2005 as the subject of a New York Times story by Michael Winerip, "Essays in Search of Happy Endings".

Inspired by films that had previously used amateur actors "with great success" – such as Roberto Rossellini's Rome, Open City, Vittorio De Sica's Bicycle Thieves, and Fernando Meirelles's City of God – Jacobs took a similarly neorealist approach by seeking an amateur performer for Down for Life's lead role of "Rascal." He told the Los Angeles Times, "I figured it would be easier to teach a street kid to act than to teach a teen actor to play street."

After a casting search that included thousands of teenagers at Los Angeles high schools, he cast Jessica Romero in her film debut and other amateur actors in various roles. Adult cast members include Danny Glover as a supportive teacher, Kate del Castillo, Laz Alonso, Elizabeth Peña, and a cameo by rapper Snoop Dogg. Much of the film was shot on location at Locke High School, which the film's real-life inspiration Lesly Castillo was attending at the time she wrote her essay.

Down for Life premiered at the Toronto International Film Festival in 2009. The Toronto Globe and Mail called it "gritty, wallop-packing... Disturbingly frank, the film assaults its viewers, but in a very effective way." Reed Johnson of The Los Angeles Times described the film as "more authentic and credible than many of the countless other movies that have been made over the decades about L.A. gang life." Erin Oke of Exclaim wrote that "It's well realized and not without some hope, but the unrelenting bleakness and harsh depictions of violence make Down for Life difficult to watch." Peter Brunette of The Hollywood Reporter praised the film's realism and "authenticity", noting, "Jacobs also has a remarkable feel for rhythm".

Down for Life was included in the first film festival at the Simon Wiesenthal Center's Museum of Tolerance in 2010. In 2019, BuzzFeed included it on a list of the 27 most popular Latino movies. In 2021, the US Congressional Hispanic Caucus nominated Down for Life to be included in the National Film Registry as one of 25 "important examples of Latino artistic and cinematic achievement."

== Armadillo United ==
In January 2025, it was announced that Jacobs' next project would be Armadillo United, a "fantastical sports comedy" about a youth soccer team that advances to the World Cup of Youth Soccer. The film's cast includes Rubén Blades, Danny Trejo, Danay Garcia, and Antonio Banderas, with Banderas playing an ice cream vendor who believes himself to be Argentine soccer legend Diego Maradona. The film is being made in coordination with Houston Dynamo of Major League Soccer.

== Other activities ==
Jacobs is the founder and president of Archer Entertainment Group, an integrated media and production company. In 2021, he founded JFI, a non-profit that benefits Arab and Jewish filmmakers in Israel.

== Filmography ==
- Nina Takes a Lover—director, producer, writer
- Mail Bonding—writer, executive producer
- Sinbad: Beyond the Veil of Mists—director
- Just One Night—director, writer
- American Gun—director, writer
- Down for Life—director, writer
