= Sinbad: Beyond the Veil of Mists =

- Theatrical release poster
- Directed by: Alan Jacobs; Evan Ricks
- Written by: Jeff Wolverton
- Based on: Sinbad the Sailor from One Thousand and One Nights
- Produced by: Sriram Rajan
- Starring: Brendan Fraser; Leonard Nimoy; Jennifer Hale; John Rhys-Davies; Mark Hamill
- Edited by: Scott Conrad
- Music by: Chris Desmond
- Production companies: Improvision Corporation; Pentafour Software
- Distributed by: Phaedra Cinema
- Release date: 28 January 2000
- Running time: 82 minutes
- Countries: India; United States
- Language: English
- Budget: $30 million
- Box office: $29,245

Sinbad: Beyond the Veil of Mists is a 2000 Indian-American animated film. It is the first feature-length computer animation film created exclusively using motion capture. While many animators worked on the project, the human characters were entirely animated using motion capture. It was filmed at Raleigh Studios in Los Angeles, over a three-month period in 1997. The film was produced by Pentafour Software, now known as Pentamedia Graphics.

Along with Pandavas: The Five Warriors (2000), this was one of the first full-length computer-graphics-based features made in India.

== Plot ==
Sinbad discovers a mysterious island ruled by King Chandra and his daughter, Princess Serena. Serena is on her voyage beyond the "Veil of Mists". She seeks the help of Sinbad and his crew as they set out in search of the magic potion to save King Chandra from the evil clutches of the mysterious sorcerer Baraka. Their adventures with deep-sea monsters, pre-historic bats and the fish people in the land beyond the Veil of Mists, fills this action packed adventure film.

== Voice cast ==
- Brendan Fraser as Sinbad
- John Rhys-Davies as King Chandra
- Jennifer Hale as Princess Serena
- Leonard Nimoy as Baraka
- Mark Hamill as Captain of the Guards
- Robert Allen Mukes as King's guard / Executioner
- Harry Zinn as Lead guard
- K.W. Miller as Babu
- Clint Carmichael as Guard
- Alice Amter as Bar wench
- Jeff Wolverton as Miscellaneous crew
- Allan Lurie as Baraka's brother
- Jim Cummings as John Rackham
- Nick Jameson as Mook
- Kevin Michael Richardson as Mustafa

== Production ==
Sinbad: Beyond the Veil of Mists was billed as "the first full-length animated feature using the 3-D animated motion capture process". The film used different actors for the motion caption of the main characters based on their particular size and body shape, as well as another set of actors for the facial movements. A couple of hundred animators in Madras, India, worked on the animation, as well as a smaller group in Los Angeles.

Produced by Pentamedia Graphics and Improvision Corporation with assistance of Pentafour Software and Madras. It was purchased by Trimark Pictures for television distribution and had a limited theatrical release in Los Angeles, New York and Chicago. The motion capture technology was provided by the House of Moves Motion Capture Studios in Los Angeles.

== Box office ==
The film grossed $29,245 domestically.

== See also ==
- List of computer-animated films
