= American Gun (2002 film) =

- UK DVD cover
- Directed by: Alan Jacobs
- Written by: Alan Jacobs
- Produced by: Brent Morris
- Starring: James Coburn; Virginia Madsen; Barbara Bain; Alexandra Holden; Walter Jones
- Cinematography: Phil Parmet
- Music by: Anthony Marinelli
- Production companies: Escalon Film Partners; Archer Entertainment Group
- Distributed by: Lightning Entertainment
- Release date: June 13, 2002
- Running time: 89 minutes
- Country: United States
- Language: English

American Gun is a 2002 American independent drama film written and directed by Alan Jacobs. It stars James Coburn (in his final film role), Virginia Madsen, Barbara Bain and Alexandra Holden.

== Plot ==
Martin Tillman (James Coburn), a World War II veteran, is on a cross-country journey to trace the origin of the gun used to kill his daughter Penny (Virginia Madsen). On the way, he seeks his granddaughter Mia (Alexandra Holden).

== Cast ==
- James Coburn as Martin Tillman. This was James Coburn's final film role before his death shortly after the film's release.
  - Ryan Locke as Young Man Martin Tillman
  - Chapin Long as Young Boy Martin Tillman
- Virginia Madsen as Penny Tillman
- Barbara Bain as Anne Tillman
  - Niesha Trout as Young Anne Tillman
- Alexandra Holden as Mia
  - Devin Irish as Young Mia
  - Sarah Michael Ezzo as Baby Mia
- Paula Murad Coburn as Jasmine
- Jesse Pennington as Pastor
- Jason Winther as Mike
- Alex Feldman as McNee
- Martin Kove as Theodore Huntley
- Walter Emanuel Jones as J.B.
- Andrea C. Pearson as Jewel
- Anthony Harrell as Kyle
- Toby Smith as Valerie
- Antoni Corone as Charles Anderson
- Joey Diaz as Gun Smuggler
- Laurie O'Brien as Martin's Mother
- Max Thayer as Martin's Grandfather
- Michael Esper as Burglar

== Production ==
Writer/director Alan Jacobs was inspired by a visit to the Smith & Wesson factory in Massachusetts, where he saw an obituary for a young girl above the workbench where a man was assembling guns. He wondered if the worker had perhaps assembled the gun that killed the girl. "At that moment it clicked," Jacobs said. "I had recently read a book called Lethal Passage by the journalist Erik Larson who tracked down the history of a submachine gun that ended up in the hands of a kid who took it to school one day. That put the idea in my head that a gun could have a history."

The film was shot over a period of 40 days of principal photography which began in December, 2000 in Rutland, Vermont, followed by Los Angeles, California, Las Vegas, Nevada and Miami, Florida. The film was shot by cinematographer Phil Parmet in 35mm Kodak color, black & white, with additional footage on Sony PD150 mini-DV, and the combination of formats won the Modern Digital Cinematography Award at the Seattle Independent Film Festival in 2002.

== Reception ==
On Rotten Tomatoes, the film holds an approval rating of 39% based on 18 reviews. Critics generally praised Coburn's lead role, with Andrew Wright of The Portland Mercury writing, "Coburn is the whole show [here]."

Jacobs' directing and screenplay drew a variety of reactions. David Hunter of The Hollywood Reporter wrote that Jacobs was "getting a lot of quality cinema out of a tight budget" and praised the "risky" storytelling, while David Nusair at Reel Film Reviews called it a "mostly engaging and intriguing character study". However, Chris Hewitt of the St. Paul Pioneer Press criticized the film's "anti-gun message, warm family drama … and its fake-out structure."
