= A Thousand Cuts (2012 film) =

- Directed by: Charles Evered
- Written by: Charles Evered; Eric Barr; Marty James
- Produced by: Audrey Loggia; Kim Waltrip
- Starring: Michael O'Keefe; Michael A. Newcomer
- Cinematography: Shawn Dufraine
- Edited by: Marty James
- Music by: Kevin Saunders Hayes; William Seegers
- Production companies: Kim and Jim Productions; Wonderstar Productions
- Distributed by: Horizon Movies
- Release dates: January 2012 (Palm Springs International Film Festival); January 22, 2013 (DVD)
- Running time: 85 minutes
- Country: United States
- Language: English

A Thousand Cuts is a 2012 American thriller film directed by Charles Evered, starring Michael O'Keefe and Michael A. Newcomer. The story revolves around a father, (O'Keefe), who seeks to take revenge on a Hollywood director whom he believes made a film that inspired the murder of his daughter. The film was a 2013 Nominee for a Saturn Award -- Best DVD/Blu-Ray Release.

== Cast ==
- Michael O'Keefe as Lance
- Michael A. Newcomer as Frank
- Olesya Rulin as Melanie
- James Van Patten as Mark
- David Naughton as Alan
- Madi Goff as Susan Bennett
- Joshua Fardon as Derrick
- Jessie Cantrell as Kathryn
- Charleene Closshey as Katy
- Idrise Wardel as Kenny
- Keila Dolle as Clare
- Kim Waltrip as Mrs. Ross

== Reception ==
Patrick Cooper of Bloody Disgusting wrote that Evered "has crafted an intelligent, relevant thriller that’s driven by two great leads. It takes longer than it should to get going, but once it does it’s thoroughly absorbing – even when predictable."

Adam Tyner of DVD Talk rated the film 1.5 stars out of 5, and called it "competent but only sporadically effective", writing that it is "still too uneven to recommend with anything resembling enthusiasm, and the rough-hewn production doesn't make for high definition eye candy so much."
