= Summer of Fear (1996 film) =

- Based on: Simon Says by Gloria Murphy
- Written by: John Gay
- Directed by: Mike Robe
- Starring: Gregory Harrison; Glynnis O'Connor; Lee Garlington; David Gallagher; Corin Nemec
- Music by: Mark Snow
- Country of origin: United States
- Original language: English

Production
- Executive producers: Mike Robe; Richard Thomas
- Producer: S. Bryan Hickox
- Cinematography: Alan Caso
- Editor: Sabrina Plisco-Morris
- Running time: 100 minutes
- Production companies: Mike Robe Productions; Hallmark Entertainment

Original release
- Network: CBS
- Release: April 3, 1996

Summer of Fear is a 1996 American made-for-television psychological thriller film starring Gregory Harrison, Glynnis O'Connor, Lee Garlington and Corin Nemec. It is directed by Mike Robe based on the novel Simon Says by Gloria Murphy and premiered on CBS on April 3, 1996.

== Plot ==
Lucas Marshall (Gregory Harrison) is a corporate executive who has inherited a summer cottage from his deceased aunt and decides to bring his family there for a summer vacation. En route to the cottage, the Marshalls encounter two evil men who attack the family only to be rescued by Simon (Corin Nemec), a 19-year-old mysterious drifter. Lucas then makes the fatal mistake of welcoming Simon into his family home.

Soon, Simon begins to play psychological games with the family, and Lucas becomes concerned as the young man forces his way into the family by becoming a role model to their son Zack (David Gallagher). Although Simon seems like a good-natured person, Lucas has bad feelings about him and fears that Simon may harbor a dark secret.

== Cast ==
- Gregory Harrison as Lucas Marshall
- Glynnis O'Connor as 'Cat' Marshall
- Lee Garlington as Winnie
- Corin Nemec as Simon
- David Gallagher as Zack
- Natalie Shaw as Haley
- Tom Nowicki as Cooper
- David Jaynes as Earl
- Mike Pniewski as Warren

== Production ==
Summer of Fear was shot entirely on location in Jacksonville, Florida from January 22 to February 14, 1996.

== Home video release ==
Summer of Fear was released on DVD by Platinum Disc on March 8, 2007.
