= Natalie Shaw =

American actress

- Years active: 1988–present
- Television: House, Under Suspicion
- Parents: Susan Damante; Larry Shaw
- Relatives: Vinessa Shaw (sister)

Natalie Shaw is an American actress who played the character Shane Fusco on the television series Under Suspicion, Tally in Just One Night with Timothy Hutton, Rachel Kaplan on the House, M.D. episode "Babies & Bathwater", and more. She was also in a Roman Coppola-directed Levis commercial. She is the daughter of actress Susan Damante and the younger sister of actress Vinessa Shaw.

== Early life ==
Shaw graduated from Sarah Lawrence College.

== Filmography ==
Year	Title	Role	Notes
1994–1995	Under Suspicion	Shane Fusco	Main role
1996	Summer of Fear	Haley	TV movie
1997	413th Hope Street (TV series)	Lilith	Episode: Lost Boys and Gothic Girls
1998	Glory Girl	Cynthia	Short Film
1999	The Caseys	Series Regular	TV movie
2000	Just One Night	Tali	
2005	House	Rachel Kaplan	Episode: Babies & Bathwater
2012	Game Over (TV series)	Green Bird	
2013	From The Woods	Laura Mayfare	Short Film
2013	Touch	Simone	Short Film
2014	Fatal Instinct	Gabby	
2014	April Rain	Alex's Mom	
2014	Land of Fire	Natalie	
2015	Milkshake	Mac	
2016	Tallahassee	TBA	
2017	Sex and Violence! Or: A Brief Review of Simple Physics	Patti	
2018	Whisper	Nina	
