= Cristi Conaway =

American actress (born 1964)

- Born: Cristi Lea Conaway; August 14, 1964 (age 62); Lubbock, Texas, U.S.
- Other name: Christi Conaway
- Occupations: Actress; Fashion designer
- Years active: 1990–2002
- Spouse(s): Salvator Xuereb (1991 - ?); Mark Murphy
- Children: 2
- Website: Cristi Conaway Design (archived)

Cristi Lea Conaway (born August 14, 1964) is an American fashion designer and former actress.

== Early life and education ==
Conaway was raised in Lubbock, Texas. Her father was a car dealer and her mother is a real estate agent. She had attended Southern Methodist University, where she had studied acting.

== Career ==
Conaway moved from Dallas to Los Angeles, California to start acting where she began as a catalog model. She made her television debut on the 1990 television film, Children of the Bride, and her film debut in the 1991 film, Doc Hollywood in a minor role. In 1992, Conaway appeared in the film, Batman Returns, as the Ice Princess. After Batman Returns, she worked in various roles in TV shows and films, including Tales from the Crypt. She also had played the "other woman", Honey Parker in the 1993 remake of Attack of the 50 Ft. Woman. In 1997, she co-starred in the short-lived TV series, Timecop, based on the 1994 film, as Claire Hemmings.

In 2002, Conaway left her acting career to become a fashion designer. She had started with scarves, but later on, she had expanded her line to include sweaters and silk dresses, and in 2004, she had added a men's collection.

== Filmography ==
=== Film ===
- Doc Hollywood (1991) - Receptionist at Halberstrom Clinic
- Batman Returns (1992) - Ice Princess
- Husbands and Wives (1992) - Shawn Grainger
- Nina Takes a Lover (1994) - Friend
- Underworld (1996) - Julianne
- My Brother's War (1997) - Kelly Hall
- Joe Somebody (2001) - Abby Manheim

=== Television ===
- Children of the Bride (1990) - Lydia
- Attack of the 50 Ft. Woman (1993) - Louise "Honey" Parker
- Tales from the Crypt (1995) - Willa Sandelton ("99 & 44/100% Pure Horror")
- Timecop (1997) - Claire Hemmings

=== Video games ===
- Loadstar: The Legend of Tully Bodine (1994) - News Anchor (voice)

== Personal life ==
Conaway is married to Mark Murphy. The couple have two children together and live in Santa Monica, California. She was previously married to actor Salvator Xuereb in 1991.
