= Just One Night (film) =

- Release poster
- Directed by: Alan Jacobs
- Written by: Alan Jacobs
- Starring: Timothy Hutton; Maria Grazia Cucinotta
- Cinematography: John J. Campbell
- Music by: Anthony Marinelli
- Release date: 2000
- Language: English

Just One Night is a 2000 American comedy film written and directed by Alan Jacobs.

== Plot ==
An earnest groom-to-be (Timothy Hutton) seeks his lost shoe all over the city through a series of increasingly crazy exploits, with the help of an unhappily married woman (Maria Grazia Cucinotta).

== Cast ==
- Timothy Hutton: Isaac Alder
- Maria Grazia Cucinotta: Aurora
- Udo Kier: Walter Lert
- Natalie Shaw: Tali
- Michael O'Keefe: Wayne
- Seymour Cassel: Arthur Imperial
- Robert Easton: Drunk Cab Driver
- Don Novello: Italian Drifter
