= The Slugger's Wife =

1985 film by Hal Ashby

- Directed by: Hal Ashby
- Written by: Neil Simon
- Produced by: Ray Stark
- Starring: Michael O'Keefe; Rebecca De Mornay; Martin Ritt; Randy Quaid; Cleavant Derricks
- Cinematography: Caleb Deschanel
- Edited by: Don Brochu; George C. Villaseñor
- Music by: Patrick Williams
- Distributed by: Columbia Pictures
- Release date: March 29, 1985
- Running time: 105 minutes
- Language: English
- Budget: $19 million
- Box office: $1.3 million

The Slugger's Wife is a 1985 romantic comedy film about a baseball star who falls for a singer. Written by Neil Simon, directed by Hal Ashby and produced by Ray Stark, the film stars Michael O'Keefe, Rebecca De Mornay and Randy Quaid. The eighth collaboration between Stark and Simon, the film was distributed by Columbia Pictures and released on March 29, 1985.

== Plot ==
Darryl Palmer is a baseball player for the Atlanta Braves. He enjoys the fame and fringe benefits of bachelor life until he meets rock singer Debby Huston, falls in love, and decides to settle down.

Debby is not ready to put her professional hopes on hold, but from the moment Darryl meets her, his own career takes off. He seeks to break professional baseball's single-season home run record and considers Debby a good-luck charm, wanting her to be there at his games.

Manager Burly DeVito appreciates that Darryl has found a settling influence in his life, but teammates Moose Granger and Manny Alvarado become increasingly aware of how obsessed Darryl is with Debby and how unhappy she has become. She feels smothered by Darryl, who interferes with her career ambitions and goes into a jealous funk whenever she goes on the road.

The couple breaks up, to the detriment of Darryl's game and his pursuit of one of baseball's greatest feats. He begins to fail on a regular basis and the team's playoff chances could be in jeopardy. Burly and his players concoct a plan to have another woman Aline Cooper, hidden by shadows, pretend to be Darryl's wife, telling him everything he wants to hear. It works temporarily, then backfires.

Debby comes back to try to work things out. Darryl does indeed hit his record-breaking home run, but whether the couple's relationship can ever be what it once was remains uncertain.

== Cast ==
- Michael O'Keefe as Darryl Palmer
- Rebecca De Mornay as Debby Huston
- Randy Quaid as Moose Granger
- Cleavant Derricks as Manny Alvarado
- Martin Ritt as Burly DeVito
- Lisa Langlois as Aline Cooper
- Loudon Wainwright III as Gary
- Georgann Johnson as Marie DeVito
- Danny Tucker as Coach O'Brien
- Lynn Whitfield as Tina Alvarado

== Production ==
Neil Simon originally set the script in Houston, but moved the location to Atlanta to give the film a more "Middle America" feeling due to Simon finding it to be a "more eclectic, more contemporary" city. The move was also influenced by the city being the headquarters of Coca-Cola, which owned Columbia Pictures. Rebecca De Mornay performed two weeks worth of scenes with a Southern accent, but the material was reshot after Ashby decided it was not working. Michael O'Keefe spent several weeks in Spring 1984 training with the Atlanta Braves in Florida, while extras included former major league stars such as Mark Fidrych and Bucky Dent. Quincy Jones composed music for the film, which included 6 rock numbers by De Mornay, two of which were released as music videos in Fall 1985.

Scenes were shot in the Fulton County Stadium in Atlanta in June 1984. Due to a lack of extras appearing in the stadium following radio advertisements, Ray Stark offered to randomly give $1,000 to a randomly chosen extra every hour; the number of occupants rose from 1,500 to nearly 10,000 in a day. In some of the stadium sequences, cinematographer Caleb Deschanel of a radio-controlled Skycam.

== Reception ==
The Slugger's Wife was a total critical and commercial failure. The film has a 0% favorable rating on the Rotten Tomatoes web site based on ten reviews. Metacritic, which uses a weighted average, assigned the film a score of 29 out of 100, based on 9 critics, indicating "generally unfavorable" reviews. Audiences polled by CinemaScore gave the film an average grade of "C-" on an A+ to F scale.

A review in The New York Times by Janet Maslin began: "It's a shock to find Neil Simon's name attached to something as resoundingly unfunny as this." Roger Ebert gave the film two stars out of four and wrote that it "has a story that demands to be taken as lighthearted nonsense, and since the screenplay is by Neil Simon, we go in expecting to have a good time. But, no, Simon's not in a lighthearted mood, and so the silliness of the story gets bogged down in all sorts of gloomy neuroses, angry denunciations, and painful self-analysis." Gene Siskel of the Chicago Tribune also awarded two stars out of four and wrote that "we can't help but laugh at the miscasting. Simon's writing should be spoken by adults, not kids. The Slugger's Wife might have worked if the ballplayer were, say, Pete Rose's age, and his wife was Tina Turner's age, but with 20-year-old-looking stars on the screen, we have to shake our heads when listening to them discussing major lifestyle decisions." Variety described the film as "about as affecting as a rock video. Despite some decent tunes and interesting performances, elements never jell." Michael Wilmington of the Los Angeles Times wrote: "A movie directed by Hal Ashby shouldn't seem so frequently tame and predictable; a movie written by Neil Simon shouldn't have such sometimes sparkless dialogue." Paul Attanasio of The Washington Post wrote: "After This Is Spinal Tap and the book Ball Four, you'd hardly think you could make a dull movie about baseball, rock 'n' roll or the two together. But here is a Neil Simon movie with all of his banality, but none of his humor — a sort of The Nod Couple." David Ansen of Newsweek declared: "We might care if we believed in the fateful love of these two people, but this baseball player has the sensitivity of a catcher's mitt, and we only put up with him because O'Keefe is a cute kid. De Mornay is an even cuter kid, but between the two of them there's maybe 40 watts of electricity."

The film was nominated for a Golden Raspberry Award for Worst Original Song for the song "Oh, Jimmy!" at the 6th Golden Raspberry Awards.

According to the web site AllMovie, the film earned $1,300,000 in box-office receipts.

== See also ==
- List of baseball films
