= Children of Paranoia =

2011 novel by Trevor Shane

- Children of Paranoia cover
- Author: Trevor Shane
- Language: English
- Genre: thriller- speculative fiction
- Publisher: Dutton
- Publication date: September 2011
- Pages: 371
- ISBN: 978-0-525-95237-4

Children of Paranoia is a speculative fiction thriller novel written by Trevor Shane and published in September 2011.

== Plot ==
Since the age of eighteen, Joseph has been assassinating people on behalf of a cause that he believes in but doesn't fully understand. The War is ageless, hidden in the shadows, governed by a rigid set of rules, and fought by two distinct sides — one good, one evil. The only unknown is which side is which. Soldiers in the War hide in plain sight, their deeds disguised as accidents or random acts of violence amidst an unsuspecting population ignorant of the brutality that is always inches away.

Killing people is the only life Joseph has ever known, and he's one of the best at it. But when a job goes wrong and he's sent away to complete a punishingly dangerous assignment, Joseph meets a girl named Maria, and for the first time in his life his singleminded, bloody purpose fades away.

Before Maria, Joseph's only responsibility was dealing death to the anonymous targets fingered by his superiors. Now he must run from the people who have fought by his side to save what he loves most in this world.

== Reception ==
Corey Michael Dalton reviewed Children of Paranoia for the Saturday Evening Post stated that "The way in which the characters on one side of the war demonize the characters on the other—even when they don’t really understand why—makes an astute observation about the way humans work in general" and concludes that "Shane’s work here is impressive." Stephen L. Brayton reviewed Children of Paranoia for Suspense Magazine and said "This is a powerful story, one where you ask for an explanation, but after the last chapter, you wind up looking at certain aspects of life and wondering about the point of them." BuzzFocus called Children of Paranoia a "disturbingly good adventure."

== Film adaptation ==
On August 1, 2013 CBS Films has acquired the film rights of the novel. Screenwriter Mark Verheiden is set to adapt the film, Akiva Goldsman will produce the film for the CBC Films. CBS Films has set Afflicted directing team Derek Lee and Clif Prowse to direct the adaptation.
