= Nina Takes a Lover =

- Theatrical release poster
- Directed by: Alan Jacobs
- Written by: Alan Jacobs
- Produced by: Jane Hernandez; Alan Jacobs
- Starring: Laura San Giacomo; Paul Rhys; Michael O'Keefe; Cristi Conaway; Fisher Stevens
- Cinematography: Phil Parmet
- Edited by: John Nutt
- Music by: Todd Boekelheide
- Production companies: Alan Jacobs Productions; Archer Entertainment Group; Sharona Productions
- Distributed by: Triumph Films
- Release dates: January 22, 1994 (Sundance Film Festival); March 3, 1995 (United States)
- Running time: 100 minutes
- Country: United States
- Language: English
- Budget: $600,000

Nina Takes a Lover is a 1994 American romantic comedy film written and directed by Alan Jacobs. The film stars Laura San Giacomo, Paul Rhys, Michael O'Keefe, Cristi Conaway and Fisher Stevens. The film was released on March 3, 1995, by Triumph Films.

== Plot ==
Nina is being interviewed by a San Francisco Chronicle journalist doing a piece on marriage and infidelity. In flashbacks, she provides detailed accounts of an affair she had with a British photographer. Nina, who is starved for romance in her marriage, meets the photographer at a park when she sits next to him on a bench one day. While Nina's husband is away on a business trip for three weeks, Nina enters into an affair with the photographer, who is himself married. The journalist is also shown interviewing the photographer, who admits to his affair with Nina.

At the same time of Nina's liaison, her best friend is having an affair with Paulie, the manager of a coffee shop. Nina allows the couple to rendezvous in her apartment, but she is accused of having an affair with Paulie after he steals a pair of Nina's underwear and leaves it on the seat of his car.

Just as Nina's affair with the photographer blossoms into something more intense, she learns the photographer has been sleeping with other women. As she tells her story to the journalist, she reveals the photographer is actually her husband, and the "affair" was simply an attempt to spice up the marriage. The film ends with Nina and her husband's marriage on solid ground after their ruse.

== Cast ==
- Laura San Giacomo as Nina
- Paul Rhys as Photographer
- Michael O'Keefe as Journalist
- Cristi Conaway as Friend
- Fisher Stevens as Paulie

== Production ==
The film was shot in the San Francisco Bay Area. Locations included the Vallejo and Chavez Streets and the Music Concourse at the Golden Gate Park. Scenes were also filmed at the Pergola at Lake Merritt in Oakland.

== Reception ==
Nina Takes a Lover received mixed reviews. On Rotten Tomatoes, the film has an approval rating of 50% based on 6 critics' reviews.

Todd McCarthy of Variety called it "a wisp of a film that leaves no indelible impression save a general attractiveness and civilized sensibility." Roger Ebert praised the acting and said the two leads "generate authentic chemistry," but said he "felt vaguely cheated and empty" when the movie concluded. Stephen Holden of The New York Times wrote that the film "aspires to be a gently amused evocation of sexual boredom within marriage. It even offers a novel solution to the problem. But its characters are hopelessly shallow, evasive and charmless, the perfect targets for confirmed yuppie-bashers."

TV Guide said "San Francisco's charm is well used" and the film makes it seem "like the most romantic city on earth." David Armstrong of the San Francisco Chronicle wrote that while the film's twist ending didn't feel convincing, Alan Jacobs "coaxes warm yet wary performances from his actors" and "has a good ear for how lovers talk - the shyly revealed secrets, the shared code words - and a strong sense of the way newly intimate strangers peel away layers of defense, their own and the other person's."
