= Timecop (TV series) =

- Genre: Science fiction
- Created by: Mark Verheiden
- Based on: Timecop by: Mike Richardson; Mark Verheiden
- Starring: Ted King; Don Stark; Kurt Fuller; Cristi Conaway
- Theme music composer: Brad Fiedel
- Composer: Ross Levinson
- Country of origin: United States
- Original language: English
- No. of seasons: 1
- No. of episodes: 9

Production
- Running time: 60 minutes
- Production companies: Lawrence Gordon Productions; December 3rd Productions; Dark Horse Entertainment; Universal Television

Original release
- Network: ABC
- Release: September 22, 1997 – July 18, 1998

Related
- Timecop

Timecop is an American science fiction television series. The show was broadcast on the ABC network and first aired in 1997. The series is based on the successful Jean-Claude Van Damme film, Timecop (1994) from Universal Studios, which was in turn inspired by the Dark Horse comic of the same name. Thirteen episodes of the series were ordered, but only nine episodes aired.

The show was broadcast on the ABC network and first aired in 1997, leading off the Monday night lineup at 8 p.m. before Monday Night Football. It did not use any cast from the film and only one character was reused.

== Premise ==
In 2007, time travel is a reality using time sleds to enter the time stream. However, the technology has leaked beyond the United States government. Rogue time sleds built by other parties are sending criminals into the past for a price. The Time Enforcement Commission was formed to retrieve and arrest the criminals, preventing the alteration of history.

== Cast and characters ==
- Ted King as Officer Jack Logan
- Cristi Conaway as Officer Claire Hemmings

Hemmings was originally part of the TEC’s science and research division providing support at headquarters. She eventually accompanies Logan in the field on missions. Originally adversarial, she becomes Logan’s romantic interest.

- Don Stark as Captain Eugene Matuzek

Matuzek is in charge of the TEC and is the only character carried over from the film the show is based on, although recast with Stark replacing Bruce McGill.

- Kurt Fuller as Dr. Dale Easter

The TEC's chief historian, Easter has a range of historical interests and is a film buff who can cite the major historical events in the year any film was released.

== Episodes ==
No.	Title	Directed by	Written by	Original release date	Prod. code
1	"A Rip in Time"	Allan Arkush	Alfred Gough, Miles Millar	September 22, 1997	004
Ian Pascoe, a time traveler from the mid-21st century, kills Jack the Ripper in 1888 and takes his place.
2	"The Heist"	David Grossman	Mark Verheiden	September 29, 1997	005
An infamous jewel thief returns to 1977 New York City to steal $10 million in diamonds that were never recovered when his robbery was foiled. Logan and Detective Langford (William Devane), who originally captured the thief in 1977, return to try to stop him and find the gems. Note: 1977-era Langford is played by Joshua Devane, William's son.
3	"Stalker"	Philip Sgriccia	Elliot Stern	October 6, 1997	006
Ian Pascoe returns to 1956 to stalk and kill a popular Hollywood actress who would eventually give birth to a US President.
4	"Public Enemy"	Chris Long	Alfred Gough, Miles Millar	October 13, 1997	008
Ian Pascoe escapes from his cell and kidnaps Hemmings to ransom for his time watch, demanding that Logan meet him with it in 1928 Chicago, where Al Capone and Eliot Ness also become involved.
5	"Rocket Science"	Robert Singer	Mark Verheiden	October 20, 1997	001
In 1944 Germany, Logan tries to find out who is providing advanced technology to the Nazis to turn the V-2 into a nuclear missile.
6	"Alternate World"	Martha Mitchell	Alfred Gough, Miles Millar	June 20, 1998	009
Logan desperately revisits his own past in 1989 after a disgraced TEC member changes it, turning Logan into a notorious fugitive in 2007, hated by all of his colleagues.
7	"Lost Voyage"	Jim Charleston	Mark Verheiden	June 27, 1998	010
On board the transatlantic cruise liner Empress of the Americas in 1939, Logan and Hemmings battle hijackers from the future seeking to steal her cargo of gold bars. They are aided by Hemmings’s future grandmother (Melora Hardin).
8	"D.O.A."	Philip Sgriccia	Linda McGibney	July 11, 1998	007
After Logan and Matuzek are murdered, Hemmings goes back to earlier that day to warn them so they can try to find and stop the murderer.
9	"The Future, Jack, the Future"	Oz Scott	Art Monterastelli	July 18, 1998	003
In 1990, Logan pursues fellow timecop and best friend Tommy Maddox (Bruce Campbell), who is double-crossing a business mogul who had hired him to sabotage TEC equipment in order to win the next multi-billion dollar contract.

== Development ==
In 1996, the Los Angeles Times reported that ABC ordered a new prime-time series based on the 1994 science-fiction movie Timecop. The pilot was written by series creator Mark Verheiden.

Based on differences in cast, characters, costumes, TEC procedures and technology, episode 5, "Rocket Science," appears to be the original pilot episode and changes were made when the series entered production. Among them:

- Amy Fuller and a young character named Kreutzer are in the historical department whereas Easter is the sole historian appearing in the series. Easter is present as chief historian here but his assistants do the mission research. He also appears to be angry, jaded, unfriendly, cynical and even more sarcastic than the laid-back history nerd of the series. Fuller and Kreutzer are not seen in any other episodes.
- A scene was inserted to try to explain Hemmings' absence wherein Matuzek says Fuller was substituting for Hemmings, but Hemmings' specialty was science and technology, not historical research.
- TEC headquarters is busier, with more personnel and numerous captured time fugitives in period costumes being led through in restraints.
- Matuzek, Easter and other personnel in TEC headquarters were costumed in unconventional business suits suggesting the near future, while in the show, Matuzek reverted to contemporary suits and Easter wore aloha shirts.
- Logan uses a handheld device for data retrieval while on the mission.
- Logan protests being sent on missions, unlike in the rest of the series where he enjoys going on missions.

== Cancellation ==
Due to low ratings and poor advertising, the series was cut short after less than a season, and only nine out of the thirteen episodes were aired.

“ In 20/20 hindsight, I wish the show had been darker and grittier both in terms of the storytelling and stylistically. But we were trying to deliver an 8:00 pm show. That meant doing something 'suitable for children,' so gritty wasn't going to happen. We were just getting our sea-legs, story-wise, with our last episode, which was a sweet story about Don Stark's character Matuzek trying to reconnect with his teenage son. But we were canceled as that episode was wrapping production, and that, as they say, was that."

— Mark Verheiden, about the cancellation of Timecop.

== Novels ==
Daniel Parkinson was hired to write an adventure spin-off trilogy based on the series that continues the adventures of Officer Jack Logan. The trilogy consisted of The Scavenger (August 1998), Viper's Spawn (September 1998) and Blood Ties (March 1999). It was published by Del Rey Books.

== Availability ==
On April 1, 2021, all aired episodes except #2 "The Heist" became available to stream for free at TubiTV. For unexplained reasons (possibly music clearance issues with use of The Sylvers' "Boogie Fever"), that episode was skipped, and episodes 3-9 were renumbered as 2-8. Episode #2 can be found on YouTube.
