= Down for Life (film) =

2009 film directed by Alan Jacobs

- Directed by: Alan Jacobs
- Written by: Alan Jacobs; Trina Calderon
- Based on: "Essays in Search of Happy Endings" by Michael Winerip
- Produced by: Scott Alvarez; Frank Aragon; Laz Alonso
- Starring: Jessica Romero; Danny Glover; Snoop Dogg; Elizabeth Peña; Laz Alonso; Kate del Castillo; Emily Rios; Lil Rob
- Cinematography: Dana Gonzales
- Edited by: Clayton Halsey; Roger Marshall
- Music by: Vito Colapietro; Neely Dinkins
- Release dates: September 12, 2009 (TIFF); October 2010 (United States)
- Country: United States
- Language: English

Down for Life is a 2009 American dramatic film directed by Alan Jacobs based on the true story of a 15-year-old Latina gang leader in Watts, Los Angeles. The story follows one day in her life as she struggles to break away from her gang. Made in cinéma vérité style, the film stars many local teens, with veteran actors such as Danny Glover, Laz Alonso, Kate del Castillo, and Snoop Dogg in supporting roles. Down for Life focuses on the gritty reality of gang life and the racial tension surrounding it. Ultimately, the film's message is one of hope to those in tough circumstances while shedding light on a pressing social issue.

In 2021, the US Congressional Hispanic Caucus nominated the film to be included in the National Film Registry.

== Plot ==
The film spans one day in the life of Anjelica Soto, aka "Rascal", a 15-year-old Latino gang leader in Watts, as she struggles to survive. Surrounded by escalating violence and racial tensions, Rascal realizes her days in the gang are numbered. Encouraged by Mr. Shannon, her English teacher, to apply for a writing program in Iowa, Rascal hopes to use the material from her life to write her way out of Watts.

The forces around Rascal thrust her into a deadly cycle of violence that seems almost impossible to escape. To leave, she will have to make the dangerous decision to renounce her loyalty to the gang.

== Cast ==
- Jessica Romero as "Rascal"
- Danny Glover as Mr. Shannon
- Elizabeth Peña as Mrs. Castro
- Snoop Dogg as Mr. Hightower
- Laz Alonso as Officer Barber
- Kate del Castillo as Esther
- Lil Rob as Manny
- Nicholas Gonzalez as Officer Guttierez
- Emily Rios as Vanessa
- Cesar Garcia as "Flaco"
- Andres Xavier Sanchez as "Sneaky"
- Whitney Gamble as Aisha
- Andrea Valenzuela as "Babygirl"
- Isamar Guijarro as "Troubles"
- Carlos Knight as Extra (uncredited)

== Background ==
Down for Life is based on the actual experiences of Lesly Castillo, born October 4, 1989, in Jalisco, Mexico. The Castillo family moved to Los Angeles from Mexico when Lesly was four years old. Her father worked nights for a demolition company. Her mother was a housewife, raising Lesly and her two younger siblings. Lesly attended Locke High School in South Central Los Angeles, where some of the movie was filmed. Having the reputation as one of the city's lowest performing schools, Locke High School often witnessed "one of the homegirls or homeboys... get shot or killed or just simply put in jail."

In 2001, out of a class of 979, only 322 students graduated. Lesly began skipping school in 8th grade. While Lesly was in the process of repeating the 9th grade, she was required to attend summer school to make up the missing credits and was offered a mercy "D" if she would describe a day in her life.

Lesly has since renounced her gang ties. She currently is enrolled at Los Angeles Southwest College. In September 2007, Locke High School became a charter school operated by Green Dot Public Schools. Despite continued violence at Locke High School, Green Dot Public Schools has subdued hostility, increased parental involvement, and has organized its educational system into six academies.

== Production team ==
The film was shot on location at Locke High School, where the story was based, as well as at other locations in South Central and East Los Angeles. These locations were chosen to "evoke the city in all its stark contrasts of privilege and poverty, hope and despair."

Jessica Romero, Andrea Valenzuela, Isamar Guijarro, Sheila Ochoa, and Ilene Trujillo were discovered at local area high schools. Director Alan Jacobs chose local teenagers with no acting experience to maintain the authenticity of the story. Jacobs believed that using real girls familiar with the types of issues depicted in the film would create an honesty to their performances.

Alan Jacobs, a New York native, directed Down for Life. He and Trina Calderon wrote the screenplay, based on the August 10, 2005 New York Times article "Essays in Search of Happy Endings" by Michael Winerip. The film was produced by Scott Alvarez and Frank Aragon.

Vito Colapietro composed the music for Down for Life. Previously, he worked on the soundtracks for Barbershop (2002) and Four Brothers (2005). He also was the composer for Just Another Day (2009).

== Reception ==
In 2009, Down for Life was screened at both the Toronto International Film Festival and the Los Angeles Latino International Film Festival, where it received critical support. The film was slated for a theatrical release in Fall 2010.

Peter Hammond of The Los Angeles Times says, "Speaking of 2010 Oscar contenders... we're wondering where the next Precious is coming from. Distributors should look no further than a 2009 Toronto Fest entry Down for Life... [The cast] is mostly comprised of L.A.-based non-actors led by Jessica Romero who could become next award season's Gabourey Sidibe."

Reed Johnson, also of The Los Angeles Times says, "The emotional chemistry among...novice performers, in concert with a few seasoned pros such as Danny Glover, Kate del Castillo and Snoop Dogg in secondary roles, is one of the things that makes Down for Life feel more authentic and credible than many of the countless other movies...brings street cred to two of the movie's thorniest topics: urban girl gang bangers, and tensions between L.A. Latinos and African Americans."

Carlos Morales of The Voice, says, "This film breathes life and resurrects what is happening on the streets of not only South Central but in all major suburbs across this country. It focuses a bright beam of light on the social issue that has plagued our country for years...The acting is real, the story is real, and the action is real...It is moving, motivating and a must see!... It's deserving of a distribution deal ...and as an unofficial entry into next year's Oscar race... It's that good..."

Toronto's The Globe and Mail describes the film as a "gritty, wallop-packing Los Angeles-set drama...Unflinching (but not gratuitous) in its depiction of domestic violence and girl-on-girl brutality...Disturbingly frank, the film assaults its viewers, but in a very effective way."

Erin Oke of Exclaim. CA describes the film as "a brutal and uncompromising look at an environment characterized by poverty and desperation...The script does well capturing the contrast between the shockingly commonplace physical and sexual violence of gang life and the moments of light-hearted girlhood...Lead actress Jessica Romero is a fresh and vivid presence in her film debut as Rascal."

In 2021, the US Congressional Hispanic Caucus nominated Down for Life to be included in the National Film Registry as one of 25 "important examples of Latino artistic and cinematic achievement."

== See also ==
- List of hood films
