= The American (comics) =

1987 comic book series

- The American #1

Publication information
- Publisher: Dark Horse Comics
- Format: Comic book
- Publication date: 1987
- No. of issues: 8 regular issues, 1 special, 1 miniseries
- Main character: The American

Creative team
- Created by: Mark Verheiden (writer)

The American is an American comic book series published in 1987 by Dark Horse Comics.

The American continued for eight regular issues, a special, a miniseries, and occasional stories in anthologies, through the mid-1990s. A collection of all the lead character's appearances was published in 2005. It was written by Mark Verheiden.

== Premise ==
Since the 1950s, The American has been a symbol of hope and strength for the American people. When a reporter decides to write a story about this apparently indestructible one man army, he discovers everything is not as it appears.

== Awards ==
It was nominated for the 1988 Eisner Award for "Best New Series".
