= Trevor Shane =

American writer

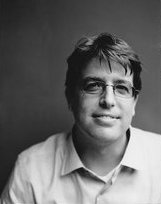
- Shane, April 2011
- Born: Trevor Shane Wiessmann; April 4, 1976 (age 50); New Jersey
- Education: Columbia University (BA); Georgetown University Law Center (JD)
- Occupation: Novelist
- Spouse: Carly strelzik
- Children: van wiessmann and Leo wiessmann
- Writing career
- Genres: thriller, suspense, speculative fiction, dystopian, drama, genre fiction
- Notable work: Children of Paranoia

Trevor Shane (born April 4, 1976) is an American author of contemporary thriller, suspense, speculative fiction, dystopian, drama and genre fiction. His debut novel Children of Paranoia was published in September 2011 by Dutton Books. It is the first book in a trilogy set to be published by Dutton Books.

He graduated from Columbia University and Georgetown University Law Center.
