= Attack of the 50 Ft. Woman (1993 film) =

Television film by Christopher Guest

- DVD cover
- Genre: Science fiction comedy
- Based on: Attack of the 50 Foot Woman; 1958 film by Mark Hanna
- Screenplay by: Joseph Dougherty
- Directed by: Christopher Guest
- Starring: Daryl Hannah; Daniel Baldwin; Frances Fisher
- Music by: Christopher Guest; Michael McKean; Nicholas Pike
- Country of origin: United States
- Original language: English

Production
- Executive producer: Joseph Dougherty
- Producers: Daryl Hannah; Chuck Binder; Debra Hill; Andrew G. La Marca; Dan Mizell
- Production location: Taft, California
- Cinematography: Russell Carpenter
- Editor: Harry Keramidas
- Running time: 90 minutes
- Production companies: HBO Pictures; Warner Bros. Television; Bartleby, Ltd.
- Budget: $7 million

Original release
- Network: HBO
- Release: December 11, 1993

Attack of the 50 Ft. Woman is a 1993 American science fiction comedy television film directed by Christopher Guest. It is a remake of the 1958 film.

The film premiered on HBO on December 11, 1993, and was later released theatrically in the United Kingdom, France and Germany. It stars Daryl Hannah and Daniel Baldwin.

== Plot ==
Nancy Archer's late mother bequeaths her entire estate to her. Nancy's father, Hamilton Cobb, hopes to use the money to gain control over the town they live in. Nancy sees her psychiatrist, Dr. Cushing, about her low self-esteem and bad marriage to Harry Archer. Harry has a mistress, beautician Honey Parker, together with whom he plans to steal the family's business away from Hamilton.

While driving one night out in the desert, she sees a UFO, which shines a bright light at her. She keeps it secret out of concern of becoming a laughing stock. She eventually convinces Harry to accompany her on another night time drive in the desert. The UFO descends from the sky. Getting out of the car for a closer look, Nancy is trapped by a bright light and disappears along with the UFO. Harry quietly returns to town and does not report the kidnapping to the local authorities, Sheriff Denby and Deputy Charlie.

A dazed Nancy is later found atop Honey's salon and is brought home. Hamilton is suspicious that Harry left her out in the desert while Harry denies any wrongdoing. As the two men argue, Nancy loses her temper. To everyone's surprise, she begins to grow; her clothes tear and rip as her head goes smashing through the ceiling into the attic.

The next morning Nancy is relocated to a large stable. There she is introduced to Dr Loeb. He observed a hormonal surge that occurred during Nancy's growth. Scared, Nancy asks that he find a cure, while keeping it a secret. Unable to convince her to move to a "controlled, therapeutic environment", Loeb explains to Harry that Nancy's condition is unique and precarious. The strain of her heart to sustain her new size would make any stress too dangerous for her. This gives Harry an idea to kill her, leaving the family business and its money to him.

As she grows, Nancy becomes more self-confident and strong-willed, empowered by her new strength over everyone else. Eventually, she invites Harry to dinner and discuss her physical, mental and emotional growth. She thinks that it will make their marriage stronger and that she has more ideas.

Harry, pretending to be unhinged by Nancy's suggestions (but carrying out his plan to overload her heart so that she dies), reveals his affair with Honey, as well as earlier flings, deliberately insults and angers her so much that she faints from the stress, crashing into the stable. Escaping to Honey's salon, he celebrates Nancy's apparent death by offering her Nancy's diamond necklace. Nancy wakes up and searches through the town for Harry.

Finding Honey and Harry, she grabs Honey, but spares her, telling her that she does not have to act stupid. Nancy later captures Harry and flees into the desert with National Guard helicopters pursuing her. Stopped by high voltage power lines and confronted by Hamilton and the authorities, she asserts herself and announces her father's ambitions to buy out the town using her money.

Due to a miscommunication from the sheriff, a sniper shoots Nancy. Taking a direct hit, she falls onto the power lines, but is rescued and taken away (with Harry still in her grip) by the UFO, proving that her claims were real. The crowds disperse, with Honey making a business agreement with Hamilton.

Inside the UFO, Harry is forced to undergo therapy with two other men under a tiny dome, watched over by Nancy and two other giantesses. The spaceship flies away into the night. A memorial museum is later dedicated to Nancy Archer.

== Cast ==
- Daryl Hannah as Nancy Cobb Archer
- Daniel Baldwin as Harry Archer
- William Windom as Hamilton Cobb
- Frances Fisher as Dr. Theodora Cushing
- Cristi Conaway as Louise "Honey" Parker
- Paul Benedict as Dr. Victor Loeb
- O'Neal Compton as Sheriff Denby
- Victoria Haas as Deputy Charlotte "Charlie" Spooner
- Lewis Arquette as Mr. Ingersol
- Xander Berkeley as Second Man
- Hamilton Camp as Prospector Eddie
- Kye Benson as Alien Woman #2
- Berta Waagfjord as Alien Woman #1

== Reception ==
Brian Gusse of Rovi wrote, "This made-for-cable remake of the cult favorite 1958 film of the same name is updated with an even more feminist slant and has a more thoughtful (and clever) script".
