= Laz Alonso =

American actor (born 1974)

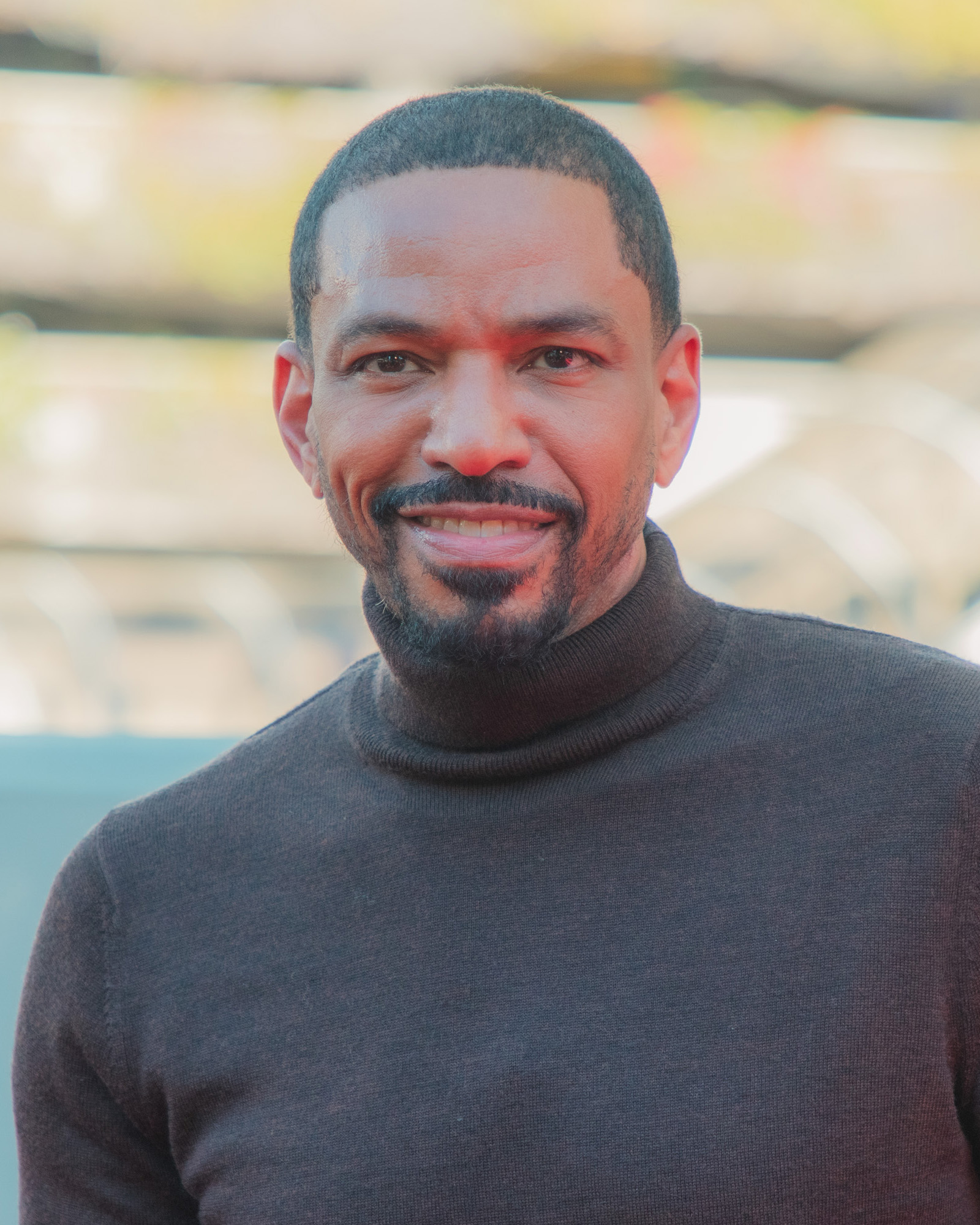
- Alonso in 2026
- Born: Lazaro Alonso; March 25, 1974 (age 52); Washington, D.C., U.S.
- Education: Howard University (BBA)
- Occupation: Actor
- Years active: 2000–present

Lazaro Alonso (born March 25, 1974) is an American actor. He is known for playing Tsu'tey in James Cameron's science fiction film Avatar and Fenix Calderon in the film Fast & Furious. Alonso has had roles in other films such as Jarhead, This Christmas, Miracle at St. Anna and Detroit. From 2019 to 2026, Alonso was part of the main cast of the superhero series The Boys (based on the comic book series of the same name) playing the character known as Marvin T. "MM (Mother's Milk)" Milk.

== Early life and education ==
Alonso was born and raised in Washington, D.C. to Afro-Cuban immigrant parents. He grew up in Mount Pleasant and graduated from St. John's College High School. He is an alumnus of Howard University. After graduating from Howard University with a BBA in marketing, he had a career as an investment banker at Merrill Lynch on Wall Street before making his way into entertainment.

== Career ==
Alonso began his career hosting the television shows A.M. @BET and NYLA. Alonso has also appeared in music videos by recording artists Toni Braxton and Aaliyah.

Alonso has had supporting roles in films such as Stomp the Yard, Down for Life, Jarhead, G, Leprechaun: Back 2 tha Hood, This Christmas and Miracle at St. Anna.

In 2009, he played Fenix Calderon, the main antagonist in the film Fast & Furious, the fourth installment in the Fast & Furious film series. Alonso had a major role as the Na'vi warrior Tsu'tey in James Cameron's science fiction adventure film Avatar.

Alonso played one of the lead characters on the 2011, TV series Breakout Kings during its first season and the first episode of season two.

He has made television guest starring appearances on The Unit, Bones, CSI: Miami, NCIS, The Practice and Eyes.

Alonso was the lead in the 2013, NBC drama Deception.

Alonso also played one of the main characters, Detective Billy Soto, on the NBC series The Mysteries of Laura.

In 2023, he played the protagonist of My Dad the Bounty Hunter, a dad named Terry who secretly works as a bounty hunter named Sabo Brok.

Alonso briefly reprised his role as Tsu'tey with a cameo in the 2025 sequel Avatar: Fire and Ash.

== Personal life ==
Alonso resides in Los Angeles, California. He speaks Spanish fluently and is a Christian.

== Filmography ==
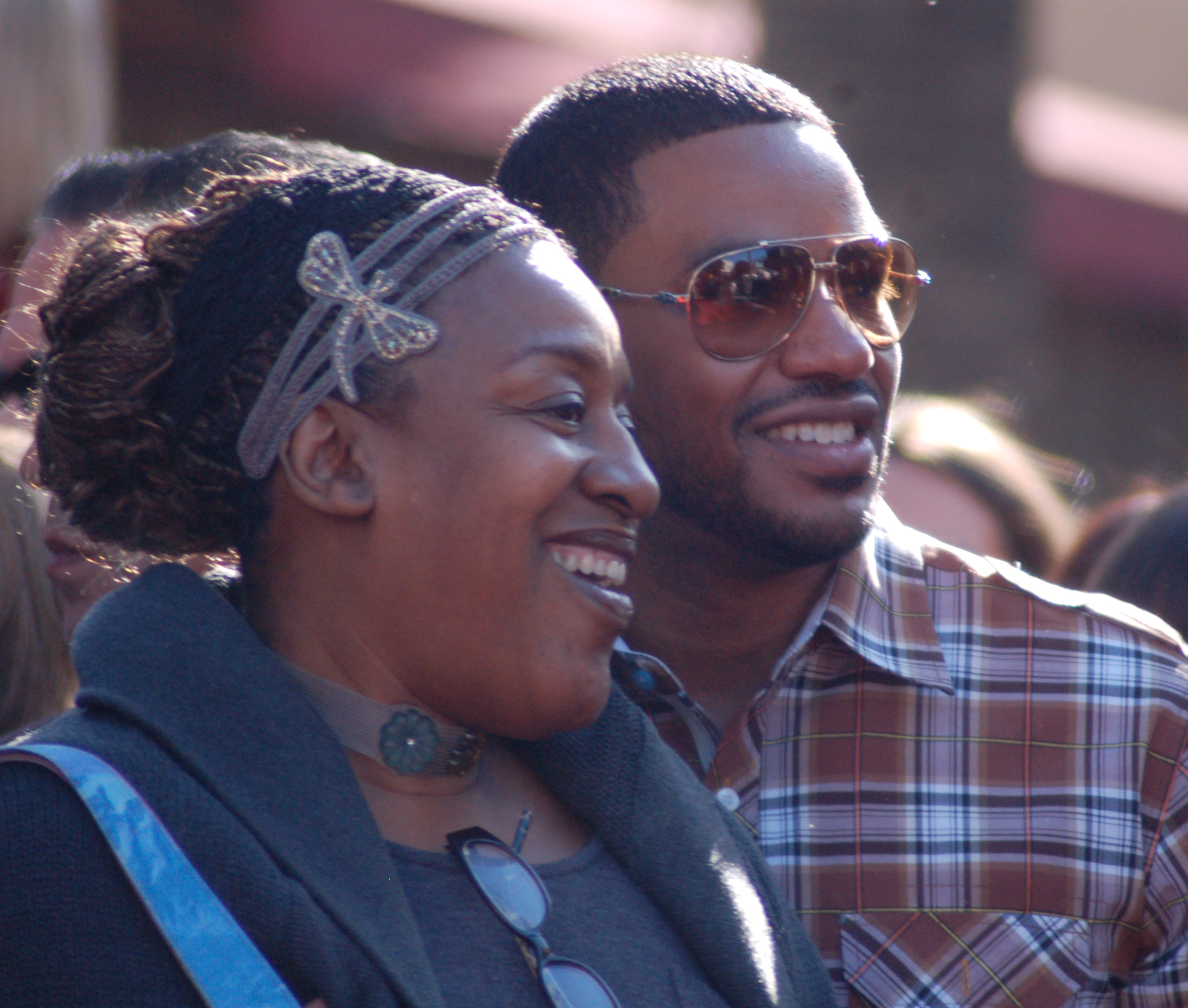
Alonso with CCH Pounder in 2009

=== Film ===
Year	Title	Role	Notes
2000	Disappearing Acts	The Moving Man	TV movie
2001	30 Years to Life	Richard	
2001	Down to Earth	BET Announcer	
2002	Morning Breath	Miguelito	Short
2002	G	Craig Lewis	
2002	All Night Bodega	Angel	
2003	Crime Partners	David Little	
2003	Leprechaun: Back 2 tha Hood	Rory Jackson	
2004	Hittin' It!	Chris B.	
2005	All Souls Day: Dia de los Muertos	Tyler	
2005	Constantine	Morgue Security Guard	
2005	The Tenants	Jacob 32	
2005	Flip the Script	Nelson	
2005	Issues	Damien	
2005	Jarhead	Lance Corporal Ramon Escobar	
2006	The Last Stand	Wesley	
2007	Stomp the Yard	Zeke	
2007	Captivity	Detective Ray Di Santos	
2007	Bunny Whipped	Kenny Kent	
2007	Mano	Angel	Short
2007	This Christmas	Malcolm Moore	
2007	Divine Intervention	Deacon Wells	
2008	Miracle at St. Anna	Corporal Hector Negron	
2009	Fast & Furious	Fenix Calderon	
2009	The Ballad of G.I. Joe	Doc	Short
2009	U.S. Attorney	Henry Williams	TV movie
2009	Columbia Ave.	Max DelGado	Short
2009	Down for Life	Officer Barber	Also executive producer
2009	Avatar	Tsu'tey	
2010	Just Wright	Mark Matthews	
2011	Straw Dogs	Deputy John Burke	
2011	Jumping the Broom	Jason Taylor	
2013	Battle of the Year	Dante Graham	
2013	Fast & Furious 6	Fenix Calderon	Cameo
2017	Detroit	John Conyers	
2018	Traffik	Darren Cole	
2018	Armed	Jessie	
2021	Wrath of Man	Carlos	
2024	Detained	Detective Avery	Also executive producer
2025	Fountain of Youth	Patrick Murphy	
2025	Avatar: Fire and Ash	Tsu'tey	Cameo
TBA	The Kellys †	TBA	Filming

=== Television ===
Year	Title	Role	Notes
2000	A.M. @ BET	Host	TV series
2001	NYLA	Host	TV series
2002	Providence	Eddie	Recurring cast: season 5
2003	La cenicienta	Lazaro	Episode: "La Cenicienta"
2003	The Practice	Derek Mills	Episode: "The Heat of Passion" & "Rape Shield"
2003–2004	One on One	Manny	Recurring cast: season 3
2004	Without a Trace	Dwayne	Episode: "The Line"
2004	Soul Food	Derek	Episode: "Pagan Poetry"
2004	NCIS	Staff Sergeant Steven Washington	Episode: "Split Decision"
2004	CSI: Miami	Dennis "Deuce-Deuce" de Labeque	Episode: "Pro Per"
2005	Entourage	Snoop's Assistant	Episode: "The Abyss"
2005	Bones	George Warren	Episode: "The Man in the Wall"
2005	Eyes	James Gage	Recurring cast
2006	One on One	Trent	Episode: "California Girl"
2006	The Unit	Sergeant Carmichael	Episode: "Natural Selection"
2010–2011	Southland	Detective Gil Puente	Recurring cast: season 2-3
2011–2012	Breakout Kings	Charlie Duchamp	Main cast
2013	Deception	Will Moreno	Main cast
2013	Person of Interest	Paul Carter	Episode: "Endgame" & "The Devil's Share"
2014	Single Ladies	Alec Hansen	Episode: "One Wedding and a Funeral"
2014–2016	The Mysteries of Laura	Billy Soto	Main cast
2018	The Bobby Brown Story	Louil Silas Jr.	Episode: "Part One" & "Part Two"
2019	L.A.'s Finest	Warren Hendrix	Recurring cast: season 1
2019–2026	The Boys	Marvin T. Milk / Mother's Milk / M.M.	Main cast, 38 episodes
2020–2021	Power Book II: Ghost	Detective Sam Santana	Recurring cast: season 1
2021	A Black Lady Sketch Show	Unknown	Episode: "But the Tilapias Are Fine Though, Right?"
2023	My Dad the Bounty Hunter	Terry	Main Character

== Video games ==
Year	Title	Role	Notes
2026	The Boys: Trigger Warning	Marvin T. Milk / Mother's Milk / M.M.	

== See also ==
- List of Afro-Latinos
