= Timecop (video game) =

1995 video game

- Japanese cover art by Ron Randall
- Developer: Cryo Interactive Entertainment
- Publishers: Victor Entertainment; JVC Musical Industries
- Designer: Fabien Fessard
- Artists: Patrice Forsans; Michel Rho; Olivier Venet; Hubert Szymczak; Thierry Roger
- Composer: David Cage
- Platform: Super Nintendo Entertainment System
- Release: JP: February 17, 1995; NA: April 1995
- Genres: Action, platform
- Mode: Single-player

Timecop is a side-scrolling action video game produced by Cryo Interactive for the Super Nintendo Entertainment System in 1995. It is based on the 1994 film of the same title and takes place after the events of the film. Despite the use of digitized actors to portray the characters in the game, Jean-Claude Van Damme was not used to pose as protagonist Max Walker. Levels range from locales in the past (e.g., New York City during the 1920s, the European front of World War II), the present day, and a dystopian Los Angeles of the distant future.

Although the game was only released for the Super NES, a version was also developed for the Sega CD, with a short demo being distributed in May 1995 alongside the European Sega Pro magazine. Despite being fully completed by the developer, JVC pulled off the Sega CD version publishing and it remained unreleased. In 2007, a complete version of the game was eventually released on the Internet by the Sega CD version coder.

== Gameplay ==
The player is in futuristic Los Angeles and is about to fight a punk.

Players must stop the original inventor of time travel, Dr. Hans Kleindast, and must fix all the wrong things that Kleindast does in the game. There are 15 levels in all; most of them are standard platforming levels. Some levels involve the use of a player-controlled vehicle and use of martial arts.

A time limit is in effect for all 15 levels of the game; resulting in instant death and the loss of a life if the timer reaches 0:00.

== Reception ==
On release, Famitsu magazine scored the game a 20 out of 40. GamePro panned the game, citing exaggerated animation, lack of digitized voice, and almost unplayable design. Allgame gave the game a 2.5 out of 5 score.

The game is popular among the Games Done Quick speedrunning community as part of their "Awful Games Done Quick" block, where they provide humorous commentary on various aspects of the video game.
