= Michael O'Keefe =

American actor (born 1955)

- Born: Raymond Peter O'Keefe Jr. April 24, 1955 (age 71); Mount Vernon, New York, U.S.
- Occupation: Actor
- Years active: 1974–present
- Notable work: The Great Santini; Caddyshack
- Spouses: Bonnie Raitt (m. 1991; div. 1999) Emily Donahoe (after 2011)
- Children: 1

Michael O'Keefe (born Raymond Peter O'Keefe Jr.; April 24, 1955) is an American actor known for his roles as Danny Noonan in Caddyshack, Ben Meechum in The Great Santini, for which he received a nomination for the Academy Award for Best Supporting Actor and Darryl Palmer in the Neil Simon movie The Slugger's Wife. He also appeared as Fred on the television sitcom Roseanne from 1993 to 1995.

== Early life ==
Raymond Peter O'Keefe Jr. was born in Mount Vernon, New York, the oldest of seven children in an Irish-American family. He is the son of Stephanie (née Fitzpatrick) and Raymond Peter O'Keefe, who was a law professor at Fordham University and who also taught at St. Thomas University. O'Keefe was raised in Larchmont, New York.

He graduated from Mamaroneck High School. He attended the American Academy of Dramatic Arts and New York University. He holds an MFA in creative writing from Bennington College.

== Career ==
O'Keefe is known for his role as Danny Noonan in the comedy film Caddyshack. He received a Best Supporting Actor Oscar nomination for his role as Ben, the oldest son of a Marine aviator in The Great Santini (1979) starring Robert Duvall, who was also nominated for an Academy Award for the film. He played a Marine in the CBS miniseries A Rumor of War (1980) as the friend of Brad Davis' character, Philip Caputo.

O’Keefe played the lead role in the 1982 film Split Image as a college athlete who is lured into a religious cult by a beautiful girl (Karen Allen). He appeared in the Neil Simon movie The Slugger's Wife (1985) as Darryl Palmer, a baseball player for the Atlanta Braves who enjoys the fame and fringe benefits of bachelor life until he meets rock singer Debby Huston, falls in love, and decides to settle down.

He appeared in the thriller film The Glass House and starred with Tommy Lee Jones in the 1983 pirate adventure Savage Islands. O'Keefe appeared with George Clooney in Michael Clayton. He has appeared twice with Jack Nicholson, as his son in Ironweed and as the father of a murdered girl in The Pledge. He appeared in the film Frozen River. He played the district attorney Calvin Beckett in the film American Violet.

O'Keefe's Broadway theatre credits include Side Man (1998), Mass Appeal (1981), Fifth of July (1980), and Reckless with Mary-Louise Parker (2004). He starred in the play A Few Good Men in 1992 with a national tour as Lt. Jg. Daniel Kaffee.

O'Keefe's highest-profile television role was as Fred, the husband of Jackie Harris (Laurie Metcalf) on the ABC series Roseanne from 1993 to 1995. He played the husband in the series Life's Work from 1996 to 1997. Additional television credits include the lead role of Simon MacHeath in the short-lived Boston-based series Against the Law, which aired on Fox during the 1990–91 season, and the role of Ron Steffey in the 1992 CBS drama Middle Ages.

O'Keefe has guest-starred on Saving Grace, The West Wing, Criminal Minds, The Closer, Law & Order, Law & Order: Special Victims Unit, Law & Order: Criminal Intent, House, M*A*S*H, Ghost Whisperer, Brothers and Sisters, Leverage, Blue Bloods and The Waltons. In 2014, he appeared in a recurring role in Homeland as CIA agent and former interim station chief John Redmond and as Detective Winslow in the Amazon Prime original TV series Sneaky Pete.

== Personal life ==
O'Keefe was married to rock/blues singer Bonnie Raitt from 1991 to 1999, when they divorced.

O'Keefe married actress Emily Donahoe in 2011. O'Keefe and Donahoe have a son.

O'Keefe was a practicing Zen Buddhist between 1986 and 2024. In 2024, he announced that he had renounced his vows as a Buddhist, citing disillusionment with the Zen Peacemakers Order and its founder Bernie Glassman as the reason. In a later interview with Tricycle, O'Keefe expressed interest in Taoism and claimed to have taken vows with the Dragon Gate sect.

== Filmography ==
=== Film ===
Sources: Hollywood.com TCM

Year	Film	Role	Other notes
1978	Gray Lady Down	Harris	
1979	The Great Santini	Ben Meechum	Nominated—Academy Award for Best Supporting Actor; Nominated—Golden Globe Award for New Star of the Year – Actor
1980	Caddyshack	Danny Noonan	
1982	Split Image	Danny "Joshua" Stetson	
1983	Nate and Hayes	Nathaniel Williamson	
1984	Finders Keepers	Michael Rangeloff	
1985	The Slugger's Wife	Darryl Palmer	
1986	The Whoopee Boys	Jake Bateman	
1987	Ironweed	Billy Phelan	
1989	The First Year		
1989	Bridge to Silence	Dan	
1990	Fear	Jack Hays	
1991	Out of the Rain	Frank Reade	
1993	Me and Veronica	Michael	
1994	Kangaroo Court		Short film
1994	Nina Takes a Lover	Journalist	
1995	Three Wishes	Adult Tom	
1996	Edie & Pen	Ken	
1996	Ghosts of Mississippi	Merrida Coxwell	
2000	Just One Night	Wayne	
2001	The Pledge	Duane Larsen	
2001	Herman U. S. A.	Dennis	
2001	The Glass House	Dave Baker	
2001	Prancer Returns	Mr. James Klock	Direct-to-video
2002	The Hot Chick	Richard Spencer	
2003	The Inner Circle	Jack Scott	
2003	Delusion	Magritte	Short film
2007	An American Crime	Reverend Bill Collier	
2007	Cherry Crush	Detective Griffin	
2007	Michael Clayton	Barry Grissom	
2008	Frozen River	State Trooper Finnerty	
2008	Keith	Alan Ascher	
2008	Chasing 3000	Dr. Stuart	
2009	American Violet	Calvin Beckett	
2011	Atlas Shrugged: Part I	Hugh Akston	
2011	Too Big to Fail	Chris Flowers	
2011	Apartment 143	Dr. Helzer	
2012	A Thousand Cuts	Frank	
2013	The Wait	Ben's Dad	
2013	Finding Neighbors	Sam	
2015	Eye in the Sky	Secretary of State Ken Stanitzke	
2018	Instant Family	Jerry	
2021	Things Heard & Seen	Travis Laughton	
2023	One True Loves	Colin	

=== Television ===
Sources: Hollywood.com TCM

Year	Title	Role	Notes
1974	The Texas Wheelers	Jeff	Episode: "X-Rated Movie"
1974	M*A*S*H	Corporal Richard Travis	Episode: "Mad Dogs and Servicemen"
1975	Lucas Tanner	Brad Patterson	Episode: "A Touch of Bribery"
1975	Friendly Persuasion	Josh Birdwell	Television movie
1975	The Blue Knight	N/A	Episode: "Triple Threat"
1975–1977	The Waltons	Chad Marshall	2 episodes
1976	The Lindbergh Kidnapping Case	Terry Long	Television movie
1976	Panache	Horseman	Television movie
1976	33 Hours in the Life of God	Freddie	Unsold TV pilot
1976	Maude	Lee Harrison	Episode: "The Election"
1977	M*A*S*H	Tom	Episode: "War of Nerves"
1978	The Dark Secret of Harvest Home	Worthy Pettinger	2 episodes
1980	A Rumor of War	Lieutenant Walter Cohen	2 episodes
1985	Alfred Hitchcock Presents	Art Toomey	Episode: "The Night Caller"
1985	The Hitchhiker	Richard Shepard	Episode: "Man's Best Friend"
1988	Unholy Matrimony	Dr. Cassius William "Bill" Sander	Television movie
1988	Disaster at Silo 7	Sergeant Mike Fitzgerald	Television movie
1989	Bridge to Silence	Dan	Television movie
1990	Too Young to Die?	Mike Medwicki	Television movie
1990	In the Best Interest of the Child	Walt Colton	Television movie
1990–1991	Against the Law	Simon MacHeath	17 episodes
1992	Middle Ages	Ron Steffey	6 episodes
1993–1995	Roseanne	Fred	35 episodes
1994	Incident at Deception Ridge	Jack Bolder	Television movie
1996	The Outer Limits	Eddie Wexler	Episode: "Beyond the Veil"
1996	The People Next Door	Garrett James	Television movie
1996–1997	Life's Work	Kevin Hunter	18 episodes
1999	Swing Vote	N/A	Television movie
2001; 2026	Law & Order	Cally Lonegan / Professor Donald Lonegan / Archbishop Keane	2 episodes
2001	The West Wing	Will Sawyer	Episode: "War Crimes"
2001	Law & Order: Criminal Intent	Father Michael McShale	Episode: "The Faithful"
2002	Law & Order: Special Victims Unit	Officer Marcosi	Episode: "Counterfeit"
2003	CSI: Crime Scene Investigation	Daniel Easton	Episode: "Got Murder?"
2003	Defending Our Kids: The Julie Posey Story	Mike Harris	Television movie
2004	Law & Order: Special Victims Unit	Ronald McCain	Episode: "Outcry"
2005	Night Stalker	Doug Panero	Episode: "Burning Man"
2006	House	Fletcher Stone	Episode: "Failure to Communicate"
2006	The Closer	Agent Tim Hecht	Episode: "Overkill"
2006	Vanished	Bob Nagel	3 episodes
2007	State of Mind	Petrovsky	Episode: "Pilot"
2007	Law & Order: Criminal Intent	Dr. Eli Rush	Episode: "Seeds"
2007	Saving Grace	Father Lloyd Tierney	Episode: "Bless Me Father, For I Have Sinned"
2007	Criminal Minds	Dr. Stanley Howard	Episode: "Scared to Death"
2008	Numb3rs	Reverend Joseph Ezra	Episode: "Atomic No. 33"
2008	Eleventh Hour	Philip Gifford	Episode: "Resurrection"
2008–2009	Brothers & Sisters	Wally Wandell	3 episodes
2009	Two Dollar Beer	Dad	Unsold TV pilot
2009	Ghost Whisperer	Dr. Byrd	2 episodes
2010	Leverage	Darren Hoffman	Episode: "The Double Blind Job"
2010	Outlaw	Dr. Damon	Episode: "In Re: Tyler Banks"
2011	Burn Notice	Wallace	Episode: "Mind Games"
2012	Daybreak	Professor Aaron Wilkins	Episode: "Chapter 2"
2013	How to Live with Your Parents (For the Rest of Your Life)	Dr. Skrutz	Episode: "How to Be Gifted"
2013	King & Maxwell	FBI Agent Frank Rigby	10 episodes
2014	Royal Pains	Dave	Episode: "Everybody Loves Ray, Man"
2014	Homeland	John Redmond	8 episodes Nominated—Screen Actors Guild Award for Outstanding Performance by an Ensemble in a Drama Series (2014)
2015–2016	Masters of Sex	Harry Eshelman	6 episodes
2015–2016	Sleepy Hollow	Jack Walters	3 episodes
2016	Law & Order: Special Victims Unit	Father Eugene O'Hannigan	2 episodes
2016	Elementary	Harris Waylon Greer	Episode: "A Burden of Blood"
2016	Blue Bloods	Lieutenant Tim Harrison	Episode: "Stomping Grounds"
2016	Falling Water	Mr. Jones	Episode: "Don't Tell Bill"
2017	The Blacklist	Mr. Deavers	Episode: "Lipet's Seafood Company (No. 111)"
2017	Sneaky Pete	Detective Winslow	10 episodes
2019	The Enemy Within	Paul Backus	2 episodes
2022	Winning Time: The Rise of the Lakers Dynasty	Jack Kent Cooke	Episode: "The Swan"
2023	Billions	Eric Scott	Episode: "Winston Dick Energy"
2025–present	Your Friends & Neighbors	Ron Cooper	10 episodes
2026	The Hunting Party	Philip Beaumont	Episode: "Xander Wax"

== Awards and nominations ==
Academy Award

- 1981: Nominated – "Best Actor in a Supporting Role" – The Great Santini

CableACE Award

- 1987: Nominated – "Best Actor in a Dramatic Series" – The Hitchhiker

Golden Globe Award

- 1981: Nominated – "New Male Star of the Year in a Motion Picture" – The Great Santini

Screen Actors Guild Awards

- 2015: Nominated – "Outstanding Performance by an Ensemble in a Drama Series" – Homeland

Capri Hollywood International Film Festival

- 2025: Honoured – "Lifetime Achievement Award"
