= Improvision =

- Company type: Public
- Industry: Life Sciences
- Founded: 1990
- Founder: Ken Salisbury; Andrew Waterfall; John Zeidler
- Headquarters: Coventry, England
- Products: Imaging, Software, Microscopy
- Parent: PerkinElmer
- Website: www.improvision.com

Improvision is a software developer based in Coventry, England. The company is the developer of Confocal, live cell imaging and image analysis software for 2D, 3D and 4D imaging.

== History ==
Improvision was founded in 1990 by Ken Salisbury, Andrew Waterfall and John Zeidler. Improvision was acquired by PerkinElmer on 2 April 2007, in a cash transaction.

The company is based in Coventry, England, and it develops and sells scientific imaging equipment and software including confocal microscopy systems and image analysis software for the Life Sciences industry.

In 2002, it was a winner in the annual Lord Stafford Awards for Innovation.

In April 2000, Improvision received a Queen's Award for Enterprise, the highest honour which can be given to a UK company, in recognition of outstanding achievement in export sales.
