= Mark Verheiden =

American screenwriter

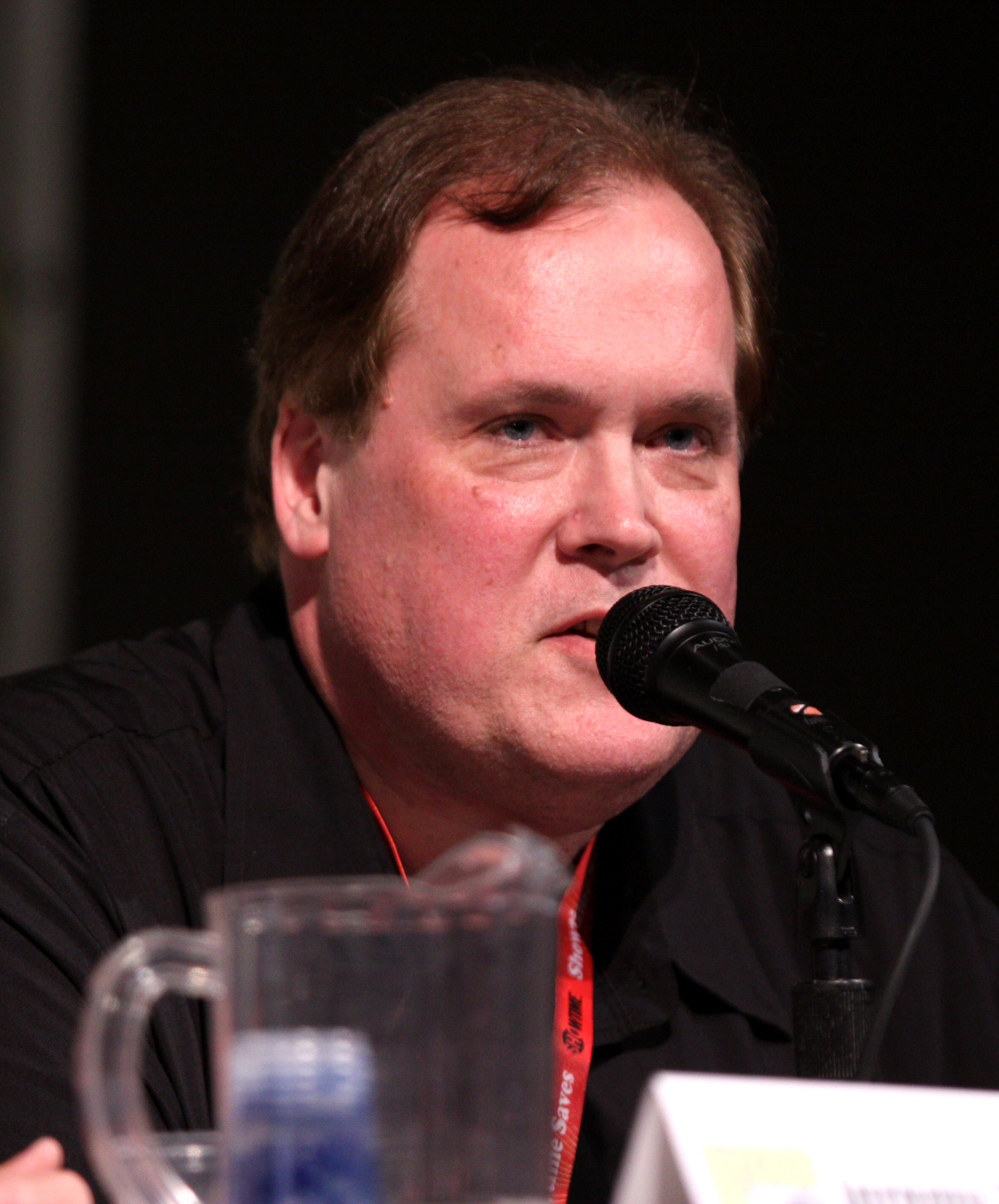
- Verheiden at San Diego Comic-Con in July 2011.
- Born: March 26, 1956 (age 70) United States
- Area: Writer
- Notable works: The American; Aliens; Predator; Evil Dead

Mark Verheiden (born March 26, 1956) is an American television, movie, and comic-book writer. He was a co-executive producer for the television series Falling Skies for DreamWorks Television and the TNT network.

== Career ==
=== Comics and comic-related work ===
Verheiden's introduction into writing comics came in June 1987, when he penned The American, which was published by Dark Horse Comics in its second year of operation. Starting in March of the following year, he wrote what was to be the first of many Verheiden/Dark Horse comics based on the 20th Century Fox film-series Aliens, and comics based on the similarly licensed property Predator soon followed. A character in the 2004 film Alien vs. Predator, involving a crossover conflict between the Aliens and Predators, was named after him.

In January 1989, he wrote the first of several stories featuring Superman for DC Comics' then-weekly title Action Comics, from #635. Verheiden later wrote scripts for the 2001 Smallville television series featuring Clark Kent in his pre-Superman teen years, and was supervising and then co-executive producer for Smallville during its first three seasons. He also wrote for DC's tie-in Smallville comic.

He contributed to the 1989 Harvey and Eisner A1 anthology series.

Commencing in the same year, his Phantom stories featured in a 13-issue maxi-series from DC Comics (following a four-issue Peter David-written miniseries) and took on 'real-world issues', such as poisoning, illegal weapon trading, racism, and toxic dumping. The stories usually took a more psychological approach than the Lee Falk-written comic strips. Luke McDonnell was the regular artist.

He followed this in 1990 as co-writer on Epic Comics' 12-issue series Stalkers.

Verheiden contributed to scripts for the feature films The Mask and Timecop, both based on Dark Horse comics, and the latter based on Verheiden's creation. Verheiden was also the creator/writer and supervising producer on the ABC television series Timecop.

In 2007, Verheiden began work on the live-action screenplay for a Teen Titans film for Warner Bros., as well as an adaptation of his own Ark (written for Dark Horse Presents in the mid-1990s) with Sony Pictures.

In the mid-2000s, Dark Horse Comics gained the Evil Dead comics licence, and from January–April 2008, Verheiden wrote the four-issue miniseries based on the Sam Raimi movie, with art by John Bolton. Verheiden was no stranger to the Evil Dead team, having previously worked with Raimi on Timecop, written a pilot for Rob Tapert and produced the screenplay for Bruce Campbell's My Name is Bruce.

Verheiden was a writer and executive producer on NBC's short-lived 2014–15 series Constantine based on the Vertigo/DC Hellblazer comic.

Verheiden has been a writer for the Netflix and Marvel television series Daredevil since 2016.

In 2018, DC Comics and Warner Bros. named Verheiden executive producer/showrunner for the first season of a live-action Swamp Thing series for the DC Universe streaming service.

In 2020, HBO announced the development of a Hellraiser television series with Verheiden attached as writer and executive producer.

=== Non-comics work ===
Verheiden was consulting producer on the 1999–2000 UPN series The Strip.

Verheiden was a writer and co-executive producer on the television series Battlestar Galactica since season two, and wrote nine episodes of the series. Verheiden wrote "Rebirth", the first regular-series episode of Caprica, the prequel to Battlestar Galactica. The episode aired in January 2010.

Verheiden joined the staff of Heroes as writer and consulting producer in 2008. He wrote two episodes of the season-three "Fugitives" storyline. He returned to Heroes for season four as writer and consulting producer, rejoining the staff with episode 407 and co-writing episodes 410 and 417.

In 2009, DreamWorks announced Verheiden was writing Quatermain, a live-action feature project.

In 2010, Verheiden joined the staff of new TNT television series Falling Skies as writer and co-executive producer.

In 2011, Verheiden was named executive producer and writer for The Dark Tower television series associated with the in-development movie series.

In 2012, Verheiden was named executive producer and writer for Hemlock Grove, a television series produced by Gaumont International Television for Netflix. Verheiden was also executive producer of "The Family", a project developed for the SyFy Network.

In 2013, CBS Films announced that Verheiden was writing the feature screenplay adaptation of Trevor Shane's novel Children of Paranoia, in association with producer Akiva Goldsman and Weed Road Films.

In 2017, Verheiden was named executive producer for season three of Ash vs Evil Dead.

== Selected filmography ==
=== Film ===
Year	Title	Producer	Writer
1987	Terror Squad	No	Story
1994	The Mask	No	Story
1994	Timecop	Yes	Yes
2007	My Name Is Bruce	No	Yes

=== Television ===
Year	Title	Producer	Writer	Creator	Notes
1997	Perversions of Science	No	Yes	No	Episode "Given the Heir"
1997-98	Timecop	Supervising	Yes	Yes	Wrote 3 episodes
1999	Martial Law	No	Yes	No	Episode "Red Storm"
1999-2000	The Strip	Consulting	Yes	No	Wrote 2 episodes
2001	FreakyLinks	No	Yes	No	2 episodes
2001-04	Smallville	Co-Executive	Yes	No	Wrote 9 episodes
2005	Dark Shadows	Executive	Yes	No	TV movie
2005-09	Battlestar Galactica	Co-Executive	Yes	No	Wrote 9 episodes
2007	Battlestar Galactica: Razor	Co-Executive	No	No	TV movie
2007	Battlestar Galactica: Razor Flashbacks	Co-Executive	No	No	Web series
2009-10	Heroes	Consulting	Yes	No	Wrote 4 episodes
2010	Caprica	No	Yes	No	Episode "Rebirth"
2011-12	Falling Skies	Co-Executive	Yes	No	Wrote 4 episodes
2013	Hemlock Grove	Executive	Yes	No	Teleplay for 2 episodes
2014-15	Constantine	Executive	Yes	No	Wrote 2 episodes
2016	Daredevil	Executive	Yes	No	Wrote 2 episodes
2018	Ash vs Evil Dead	Executive	Yes	No	Wrote episode "Family"
2019	Swamp Thing	Executive	Yes	Yes	Wrote episode "Worlds Apart"
