= Timecop =

1994 film by Peter Hyams

- Theatrical release poster
- Directed by: Peter Hyams
- Screenplay by: Mark Verheiden
- Story by: Mike Richardson; Mark Verheiden
- Based on: Timecop by: Mike Richardson; Mark Verheiden
- Produced by: Moshe Diamant; Sam Raimi; Robert Tapert
- Starring: Jean-Claude Van Damme; Ron Silver; Mia Sara
- Cinematography: Peter Hyams
- Edited by: Steven Kemper
- Music by: Mark Isham
- Production companies: Largo Entertainment; Signature Pictures; Renaissance Pictures; Dark Horse Entertainment
- Distributed by: Universal Pictures
- Release date: September 16, 1994
- Running time: 98 minutes
- Country: United States
- Language: English
- Budget: $27–28 million
- Box office: $102 million

Timecop is a 1994 American science fiction action film shot and directed by Peter Hyams and co-written by Mike Richardson and Mark Verheiden. Richardson also served as executive producer. The film is based on Timecop, a story created by Richardson, written by Verheiden, and drawn by Ron Randall, which appeared in the anthology comic Dark Horse Comics, published by Dark Horse Comics. It is the first installment in the Timecop franchise.

The film stars Jean-Claude Van Damme as Max Walker, a police officer in 1994, with time travel having been made possible, and later a U.S. federal agent in 2004. It also stars Ron Silver as corrupt senator Aaron McComb and Mia Sara as Melissa Walker, the agent's wife. The story follows Walker's life as he fights time-travel crime and investigates the politician's plans.

Timecop remains Van Damme's highest-grossing film as a lead actor (his second to break the $100 million barrier worldwide). Although met with mixed reviews, it is generally regarded by critics as one of Van Damme's best films.

== Plot ==
In 1863 Gainesville, Georgia, a time traveler armed with futuristic weapons slaughters five Confederate soldiers and steals their shipment of gold bullion.

By 1994, time travel has been invented by Dr. Hans Kleindast, prompting the U.S. Department of Justice to establish the Time Enforcement Commission (TEC) to prevent alterations to history. Travel to the future is impossible, but changes to the past can create ripples that reshape the present. Senator Aaron McComb volunteers to oversee the TEC, while police Commander Eugene Matuzak becomes its first commissioner. Detective Max Walker is offered a position, but before he can accept, he and his wife, Melissa, are attacked at home by unknown assailants. Walker survives, but Melissa is killed in an explosion.

By 2004, Walker is a veteran TEC agent. He travels to 1929 to apprehend his former partner, Lyle Atwood, who has been exploiting knowledge of the Wall Street Crash for financial gain. Atwood admits he is working for McComb, who is secretly funding his failing presidential campaign through illicit time travel, but refuses to testify for fear McComb will erase his family. Atwood is executed, and Walker grows suspicious of McComb.

After surviving another ambush, Walker is partnered with rookie agent Sarah Fielding. They travel to 1994 to investigate a disturbance and witness the younger McComb about to be bought out of a computer chip company by his partner, Jack Parker. The 2004 McComb arrives, warns his younger self of the chip's future value, and kills Parker. He also cautions his younger counterpart against making physical contact, since two versions of the same matter cannot coexist without mutual destruction. Fielding betrays Walker, revealing she works for McComb, but is gravely wounded in the ensuing gunfight as McComb escapes.

When Walker returns to 2004, he finds history altered: McComb is now a wealthy presidential frontrunner who has shut down the TEC. With Matuzak's help, Walker deduces that McComb is using Kleindast's original prototype and returns to 1994, though Matuzak is killed by McComb's men in the process. McComb concludes that Walker must be erased from history before he joined the TEC.

In 1994, Walker tracks down Fielding in a hospital, hoping to have her testify against McComb, but she is murdered by McComb's assassin while Walker is destroying evidence of her hospital stay. He inadvertently discovers Melissa's records, revealing she was pregnant when she died, and realizes he has returned to the day of her murder. He finds her and convinces her to stop his younger self from leaving home that night.

At the Walker house, McComb's henchmen attack, forcing both versions of Walker and Melissa to fight them off. The 2004 McComb arrives, takes Melissa hostage, and threatens to kill her with explosives. Confident his younger self will rise to power without Walker's interference, he is caught off guard when Walker lures the 1994 McComb to the house. Forcing the two McCombs together, Walker causes them to merge into a grotesque mass that disintegrates, erasing McComb from existence. He rescues Melissa and leaves her beside his unconscious younger self before the house explodes.

Back in 2004, Walker finds history restored: Matuzak and Fielding are alive, McComb vanished without a trace in 1994, and at home, Walker is reunited with Melissa and their young son.

== Cast ==
- Jean-Claude Van Damme as Agent Max Walker
- Mia Sara as Melissa Walker
- Ron Silver as Senator Aaron McComb
- Bruce McGill as Commander Eugene Matuzak
- Gloria Reuben as Agent Sarah Fielding
- Scott Bellis as Ricky
- Jason Schombing as Agent Lyle Atwood
- Scott Lawrence as George Spota
- Kenneth Welsh as Senator Utley
- Brad Loree as Reyes
- Kevin McNulty as Jack Parker
- Gabrielle Rose as Judge Marshall
- Callum Keith Rennie as Stranger
- Steven Lambert as Lansing
- Richard Faraci as Cole
- Veena Sood as Nurse
- Tom Glass as Driver

== Production ==
Mike Richardson wrote a three-part story titled "Time Cop: A Man Out of Time" that was included in the launch of the Dark Horse Comics anthology series in 1992. Richardson developed the story, while the comic was written by Mark Verheiden and drawn by Ron Randall. The comic told a story of Max Walker, a Time Enforcement Commission agent whose wife is implied to be dead (though the circumstances of this are unknown). Max pursues an illegal time traveler robbing a South African diamond mine in the 1930s. After capturing the robber and returning to present time, Walker realizes the timeline has been damaged because the criminal's robotic bodyguard remained in the past and was still active. Walker returns to the 1930s and defeats the robot with the help of a local whom he rewards with a diamond. Returning home, the timeline is largely restored but readers see the local became a political leader who helped end Apartheid.

Richardson and Verheiden then teamed up to write the screenplay for the movie adaptation.

It wasn't at all planned from the beginning that I would make two films with Jean-Claude Van Damme back-to-back. I was approached to do Timecop, and I loved the auspices. [Producer] Larry Gordon was involved with it; Moshe Diamant was a terrific producer; Sam Raimi was involved... It was a really clever story, and I thought it was a chance to make the best movie Van Damme ever made. I said 'yes' and we made it, and it was clear that it was going to be a hit because it previewed through the roof every time. It's still his biggest hit. So Universal and Moshe Diamant wanted to team us again as soon as possible, so they put Sudden Death together. There was never any question [to make a] Timecop 2. I would never have agreed to that. The last thing you want to do is repeat yourself. That would be awful.

— Peter Hyams, Empire Magazine

== Music ==
The musical score of Timecop was composed by Mark Isham and conducted by Ken Kugler.

=== Soundtrack ===
Track listing

1. "Time Cop" – 2:20
2. "Melissa" – 2:41
3. "Blow Up" – 2:12
4. "Lasers and Tasers" – 4:23
5. "Polaroid" – 6:10
6. "Rooftop" – 6:16
7. "C4" – 2:37
8. "Rescue and Return" – 3:22

== Release ==
=== Home media ===
Timecop was first released on VHS on February 21, 1995, LaserDisc on February 28, 1995, and later released on DVD on January 20, 1998. The DVD extras include production notes, a theatrical trailer and notes on the cast and crew.

By 2010, the rights to the film had reverted to Largo successor InterMedia, and Warner Home Video subsequently issued a Blu-ray of the film as a double feature with Bloodsport on September 14 that year. After Shout! Studios acquired distribution rights to all Largo titles, an 4K Ultra HD Blu-ray edition was released on April 29, 2025, featuring a new 4K remaster of the film.

== Reception ==
=== Box office ===
Timecop was released in the U.S. and Canada on September 16, 1994, where it opened at number one with a gross of $12,064,625 from 2,228 theaters, and a $5,415 average per theater gross. In its second week, it took the top spot again with $8,176,615. It finished its run with $54 million in the U.S. In other territories, it grossed about $75 million, for a total worldwide gross of $129 million. This makes it Van Damme's highest-grossing film in which he played the leading role, and his third to make over $100 million overall worldwide (after Double Impact (1991) and Universal Soldier).

=== Critical response ===
Critics were mixed on Timecop, citing its various plot holes and inconsistencies. On the review aggregator website Rotten Tomatoes, 43% of 44 critics' reviews are positive, with an average rating of 5.2/10. The website's consensus reads: "It's no Terminator, but for those willing to suspend disbelief and rational thought, Timecop provides limited sci-fi action rewards." Metacritic, which uses a weighted average, assigned the film a score of 48 out of 100, based on 17 critics, indicating "mixed or average" reviews. Audiences polled by CinemaScore gave the film an average grade of "B+" on an A+ to F scale.

Roger Ebert called Timecop a low-rent Terminator.

Richard Harrington of The Washington Post said, "For once, Van Damme's accent is easier to understand than the plot."

David Richards of The New York Times disparaged Van Damme's acting and previous films but called Timecop "his classiest effort to date".

The film made Entertainment Weekly's "Underrated Films" list in November 2010, mostly because of Van Damme's acting.

== Franchise ==
=== Television series ===
The film was followed by a TV series of the same name, running for nine episodes in 1997 on ABC. It starred T. W. King as Jack Logan and Cristi Conaway as Claire Hemmings.

=== Sequel ===
A direct-to-DVD sequel, Timecop 2: The Berlin Decision, was released in 2003, starring Jason Scott Lee and Thomas Ian Griffith, and directed by Steve Boyum. In 2010, Universal Pictures announced a remake of the film, to be written by Mark and Brian Gunn, but it was never made.

== Other media ==
=== Comic book ===
The film, which was originally based on a comic, was adapted into a two-issue comic book series of the same name.

=== Video game ===
A game based on the movie was developed by Cryo Interactive and released on the SNES in 1995.

=== Novelizations ===
In September 1994, a novelization of the film was written by author S. D. Perry and published by Penguin. Additionally, a series of tie-in novels by author Dan Parkinson published in 1997–1999 featured the Jack Logan character from the television series.
