= Timecop (comics) =

1992 comic published by Dark Horse

- Issue 2 of 2 of the movie adaptation, cover art by Denis Beauvais.

Publication information
- Publisher: Dark Horse Comics
- Format: Limited series
- Genre: Science fiction
- Publication date: August–October 1992

Creative team
- Created by: Mike Richardson
- Written by: Mark Verheiden
- Artist: Ron Randall

Timecop was originally published as a three-part story, "Time Cop: A Man Out of Time", in the anthology comic Dark Horse Comics (August–October 1992) and spawned the successful film Timecop.

After the film reached #1 at the box office, it managed to spin off into a video game for SNES, a short-lived TV show on ABC, a series of novels and a direct-to-video sequel in 2003.

== Development ==
Mike Richardson wrote a three-part story titled "Time Cop: A Man Out of Time", that was included in the launch of the Dark Horse Comics anthology series in 1992. Richardson developed the story, but the comic was written by Mark Verheiden and drawn by Ron Randall for issues #1-3.

Richardson and Verheiden then teamed up to write the screenplay for the movie adaptation. They followed it with a two-issue comic book adaptation of the film, published along with the film's release in 1994.

== Plot synopsis ==
=== The Man Out of Time ===
The plot of "The Man Out of Time" comic book story and the Timecop film are very different, but share the same protagonist: Max Walker.

In the three-part comic book story, Walker is an operative of the Time Enforcement Commission (TEC), which operates in 2007 and polices changes to history being made by unlawful time travelers. The sarcastic and ill-tempered Walker was once married and the thought of his wife can bring him to tears, but her fate is not made clear. A TEC monitor called the Time Pool represents alterations to history as ripples or great waves. A TEC agent is sent back in time by being launched in a personal pod that shields them from the forces involved in time travel and acts like a protective cocoon if they materialize in the middle of a wall or over a body of water or into a hostile environment. Once the TEC agent arrives and leaves the pod, it automatically returns to the future and the agent may do so as well by simply activating a small device on their person. It is explained that time is "like gravity," so journeying to another time is difficult and requires a launch pod but returning a person to their native time period is easier because reality is ready to pull them back home.

"The Man Out of Time" features Walker in pursuit of John Adam Packer, a criminal who travels to 1933 to rob a South African mine of a huge diamond. When Walker arrives, he is surprised to find that Packer has brought a RamCo hunter/killer robot for security. With the robot buried beneath cave rubble, Walker retrieves Packer with the help of a local named Joseph M'Boto. Walker gives M'Boto the diamond as a thank you before leaving with Packer.

Returning to 2007, Walker is told that his trip caused a greater change to history than Packer's original journey and he realizes the robot must have still been operational, causing havoc to history with its later actions. To restore order, Walker returns to the mine and stops the machine's rampage, again with M'Boto's help. On his return to 2007, he learns that history is now back on track with only one minor ripple left as a result of his trip, nothing that would concern the TEC. Readers realize that Walker's presence allowed M'Boto to become wealthy and become a political activist who helped lead an earlier end of Apartheid in South Africa in the 1950s.

=== Movie adaptation ===
The movie tie-in story is about a "time enforcement" officer who attempts to bring a rogue politician to justice who is using time travel to fund his presidential campaign. During the course of the film the officer discovers that the politician is also responsible for the earlier death of his wife, and numerous other previously unconnected crimes.
