= Jaws (franchise) =

American film franchise

- Official logo
- Created by: Peter Benchley
- Original work: Jaws (1975)
- Owner: Universal Pictures
- Years: 1975–1987
- Based on: Jaws by Peter Benchley

Print publications
- Novel: Jaws

Films and television
- Film: Jaws; Jaws 2 Jaws 3-D; Jaws: The Revenge

Games
- Video game: Jaws Unleashed

Audio
- Soundtrack: Jaws: Original Motion Picture Soundtrack

Miscellaneous
- Theme park attraction: Jaws (1990-2012, 2001-present)

Jaws is an American media franchise series that started with the 1975 film of the same name that expanded into three sequels, a theme park ride, and other tie-in merchandise, based on the 1974 novel Jaws. The main subject of the saga is a great white shark and its attacks on people in specific areas of the United States and The Bahamas. The Brody family is featured in all of the films as the primary antithesis to the shark. The 1975 film was based on the novel written by Peter Benchley, which itself was inspired by the Jersey Shore shark attacks of 1916. Benchley adapted his novel, along with help from Carl Gottlieb and Howard Sackler, into the film, which was directed by Steven Spielberg. Although Gottlieb went on to pen two of the three sequels, neither Benchley nor Spielberg returned to the film series in any capacity.

The first film was regarded as a watershed film in motion picture history; it became the father of the summer blockbuster movies and one of the first "high-concept" films. The film is also known for the introduction of John Williams' famous theme music, which was a simple alternating pattern of the E and F notes of a piano. Williams' musical score won an Academy Award. The film won two other Academy Awards, and was nominated for Best Picture.

The success of Jaws led to three sequels, and the four films together have earned over US$800 million worldwide in box office gross. The franchise has also inspired the release of various soundtrack albums, additional novelizations based on the sequels, trading cards, theme park rides at Universal Studios Florida and Universal Studios Japan, multiple video games, and a musical that premiered in 2004. Although the first film was popular with critics when it was originally released, critical and commercial reception went downhill with each sequel. This reception has spread to the merchandise, with video games seen as poor imitations of the original concept. Nevertheless, the original 1975 film has generally been regarded as one of the greatest films ever, and frequently appears in the top 100 of various American Film Institute rankings.

Benchley would come to regret that he ever wrote the original book, considering it encouraged a widespread public fear of sharks. As such, he spent most of his later life promoting the cause of ocean conservation.

== Background ==
Peter Benchley had been thinking for years "about a story about a shark that attacks people and what would happen if it came in and wouldn't go away". Doubleday editor Tom Congdon was interested in Benchley's idea of a novel about a great white shark terrorizing a beach resort. After various revisions and rewrites, Benchley delivered his final draft in January 1973. The title was not decided until shortly before the book went to print. Benchley says that he had spent months thinking of titles, many of which he calls "pretentious", such as The Stillness in the Water and Leviathan Rising. Benchley regarded other ideas, such as The Jaws of Death and The Jaws of Leviathan, as "melodramatic, weird, or pretentious". According to Benchley, the novel still did not have a title until twenty minutes before production of the book.

The Book of the Month Club made the novel an "A book", qualifying it for its main selection, then the Reader's Digest also selected it. The publication date was moved back to allow a carefully orchestrated release. It was released first in hardcover in February 1974, then in the book clubs, followed by a national campaign for the paperback release. Bantam bought the paperback rights for $575,000.

Richard D. Zanuck and David Brown, film producers at Universal Pictures, heard about the book at identical times at different locations. Brown heard about it in the fiction department of Cosmopolitan, a lifestyle magazine then edited by his wife, Helen Gurley Brown. A small card gave a detailed description of the plot concluding with the comment "might make a good movie". The producers each read it overnight and agreed that it was "the most exciting thing that they had ever read" and that, although they were unsure how they would accomplish it, they had to produce the film. Brown says that had they read the book twice they would have never made the film because of the difficulties in executing some of the sequences. However, he says that "we just loved the book. We thought it would make a very good movie."

== Films ==
Film	U.S. release date	Director(s)	Screenwriter(s)	Producer(s)
Jaws	June 20, 1975	Steven Spielberg	Carl Gottlieb & Peter Benchley	David Brown & Richard D. Zanuck
Jaws 2	June 16, 1978	Jeannot Szwarc	Carl Gottlieb & Howard Sackler	David Brown & Richard D. Zanuck
Jaws 3-D	July 22, 1983	Joe Alves	Carl Gottlieb & Richard Matheson	Rupert Hitzig & Alan Landsburg
Jaws: The Revenge	July 17, 1987	Joseph Sargent	Michael de Guzman	Joseph Sargent

=== Jaws (1975) ===
The original Jaws, directed by Steven Spielberg, is based on Peter Benchley's novel of the same name. It tells the story of Police Chief Martin Brody (portrayed by Roy Scheider) of Amity Island (a fictional summer resort town) and his quest to protect beachgoers from a great white shark by closing the beach. This is overruled by the town council, headed by the mayor Larry Vaughan (Murray Hamilton), which wants the beach to remain open in order to sustain the local tourist economy. After several attacks, the police chief enlists the help of marine biologist Matt Hooper (Richard Dreyfuss) and a professional shark hunter, Quint (Robert Shaw). The three voyage out onto the ocean in Quint's boat – the Orca. The shark kills Quint, but Brody manages to destroy it by shooting at a highly pressurized air tank that he has wedged in its mouth. In the end, Brody and Hooper are seen swimming away from the sinking Orca, having both managed to survive the shark attack on the boat uninjured.

=== Jaws 2 (1978) ===
The first sequel, Jaws 2, depicts the same town four years after the events of the original film when another great white shark arrives on the shores of the fictional seaside resort of Amity Island. Directed by Jeannot Szwarc and starring Roy Scheider again as Police Chief Martin Brody, who, after a series of deaths and disappearances, suspects that the culprit is another shark. However, he has trouble convincing the town's selectmen. Once fired, he has to act alone to save a group of teenagers, including his two sons, who encounter the shark whilst out sailing. Brody then manages to kill the shark at Cable Junction upon pulling up one of the underwater cables.

Steven Spielberg was asked to direct Jaws 2, but he said he would only make another Jaws film if it were a prequel focusing on the sinking of the USS Indianapolis.

=== Jaws 3-D (1983) ===
The plot of Jaws 3-D moves away from Amity Island to SeaWorld in Florida, a water themed-park with underwater tunnels and lagoons. As the park prepares to open, it is infiltrated by a baby great white shark which attacks and kills water-skiers and park employees. Once the baby shark is captured, it becomes apparent that a much larger shark, the mother, is present. The characters of Martin's sons from the first two films are developed further in this film: Michael Brody (Dennis Quaid) is the chief engineer of the park and his younger brother, Sean (John Putch), arrives at the resort to visit him. The events of the earlier films are implied through Sean's dislike of the water because of "something that happened when he was a kid." According to the press statements for Jaws: The Revenge, the events and character development from Jaws 3-D are independent from the rest of the series.

=== Jaws: The Revenge (1987) ===
The fourth and final film, Jaws: The Revenge, sees the storyline returning to Amity Island, but ignores all plot elements introduced in Jaws 3-D. No mention is made to Michael's girlfriend from the previous film, Kathryn Morgan (Bess Armstrong), or his career change from an engineer at SeaWorld to a marine biologist. In fact, one of the Universal Studios press releases for Jaws: The Revenge omits Jaws 3-D entirely by referring to Jaws: The Revenge as the "third film of the remarkable Jaws trilogy." By the start of the film, Martin Brody had died of a heart attack, although his wife, Ellen Brody (Lorraine Gary), claims that he died through fear of the shark. Her youngest son, Sean (Mitchell Anderson), now working as a police deputy in Amity, is dispatched to clear a log from a buoy. As he does so, he is attacked and killed by a shark. Ellen becomes convinced that a shark is deliberately victimizing her family for the deaths of the first two sharks. Michael (Lance Guest) convinces her to spend some time with his family in The Bahamas. However, as his job involves a lot of time on and in the sea, Ellen fears that he will be the shark's next victim. When her granddaughter, Thea (Judith Barsi), narrowly avoids being attacked by a shark, Ellen takes a boat in order to kill her family's alleged stalker. Hoagie (Michael Caine), Michael, and his friend Jake (Mario Van Peebles) find Ellen and then proceed to electrocute the shark, driving it out of the water and impaling it on the prow of Ellen's boat.

== Cast and crew ==
List indicators
- A dark gray cell indicates the character was not featured in the film.
- An ^{A} indicates an appearance through previously recorded material.
- A ^{U} indicates an actor or actress was uncredited for their role.

=== Principal cast ===
Characters	Films			
Characters	Jaws	Jaws 2	Jaws 3-D	Jaws: The Revenge
Chief Martin Brody	Roy Scheider	Roy Scheider	Mentioned	Roy Scheider^{A}
Ellen Brody	Lorraine Gary	Lorraine Gary	Mentioned	Lorraine Gary
Michael "Mike" Brody	Chris Rebello	Mark Gruner	Dennis Quaid	Lance Guest
Sean Brody	Jay Mello	Marc Gilpin	John Putch	Mitchell Anderson Jay Mello^{A}
Mayor Larry Vaughn	Murray Hamilton	Murray Hamilton		
Mr. Posner	Cyprian R. Dube	Cyprian R. Dube		Cyprian R. Dube
Deputy Hendricks	Jeffrey Kramer	Jeffrey Kramer		
Mrs. Taft	Fritzi Jane Courtney	Fritzi Jane Courtney		Fritzi Jane Courtney
Harry Wiseman	Al Wilde^{U}	Al Wilde		
Matt Hooper	Richard Dreyfuss			
Quint	Robert Shaw			
Mrs. Kintner	Lee Fierro			Lee Fierro
Harry Meadows	Carl Gottlieb			
Polly	Peggy Scott			Edna Billotto
Alex Kintner	Jeffrey Voorhees			
Tom Cassidy	Jonathan Filley			
Chrissie Watkins	Susan Backlinie			
Leonard "Len" Peterson		Joseph Mascolo		
Dr. Lureen Elkins		Colin Wilcox		
Tina Wilcox		Ann Dusenberry		
Eddie Marchand		Gary Dubin		
Larry Vaughn Jr.		David Elliott		
Tom Andrews		Barry Coe		
Grace Witherspoon		Susan French		
Andy Williams		Gary Springer		
Jackie Peters		Donna Wilkes		
Brooke Peters		Gigi Vorgan		
Marge		Martha Swatek		
Timmy Weldon		G. Thomas Dunlop		
Doug Fetterman		Keith Gordon		
Paul "Polo" Loman		John Dukakis		
Bob Burnside		Billy Van Zandt		
Patrick		Ben Marley		
Lucy		Cynthia Grover		
Kathryn "Kay" Morgan			Bess Armstrong	
Kelly Ann Bukowski			Lea Thompson	
Calvin Bouchard			Louis Gossett Jr.	
Philip FitzRoyce			Simon MacCorkindale	
Jack Tate			P. H. Moriarty	
Carla Brody				Karen Young
Thea Brody				Judith Barsi
Hoagie Newcombe				Michael Caine
Jake				Mario Van Peebles
Louisa				Lynn Whitfield

=== Additional crew ===
Role	Film			
Role	Jaws	Jaws 2	Jaws 3-D	Jaws: The Revenge
Role	1975	1978	1983	1987
Director(s)	Steven Spielberg	Jeannot Szwarc	Joe Alves	Joseph Sargent
Producer(s)	David Brown; Richard D. Zanuck	David Brown; Richard D. Zanuck	Rupert Hitzig; Alan Landsburg	Joseph Sargent
Writer(s)	Carl Gottlieb; Peter Benchley	Carl Gottlieb; Howard Sackler	Screenplay by: Carl Gottlieb; Richard Matheson; Story by: Guerdon Trueblood	Michael de Guzman
Composer(s)	John Williams	John Williams	Alan Parker	Michael Small
Cinematographer(s)	Bill Butler	Michael Butler	Chris Condon; Austin McKinney; James A. Contner	John McPherson
Editor(s)	Verna Fields	Neil Travis; Steve Potter; Arthur Schmidt	Corky Ehlers; Randy Roberts	Michael Brown
Runtime	124 minutes	116 minutes	98 minutes	90 minutes
Production companies	Universal Pictures, Zanuck/Brown Company	Universal Pictures, Zanuck/Brown Company	Universal Pictures, Alan Landsburg Productions, MCA Theatricals	Universal Pictures
Distributor	Universal Pictures	Universal Pictures	Universal Pictures	Universal Pictures

== Production ==
=== Development ===
==== Jaws (1975) ====
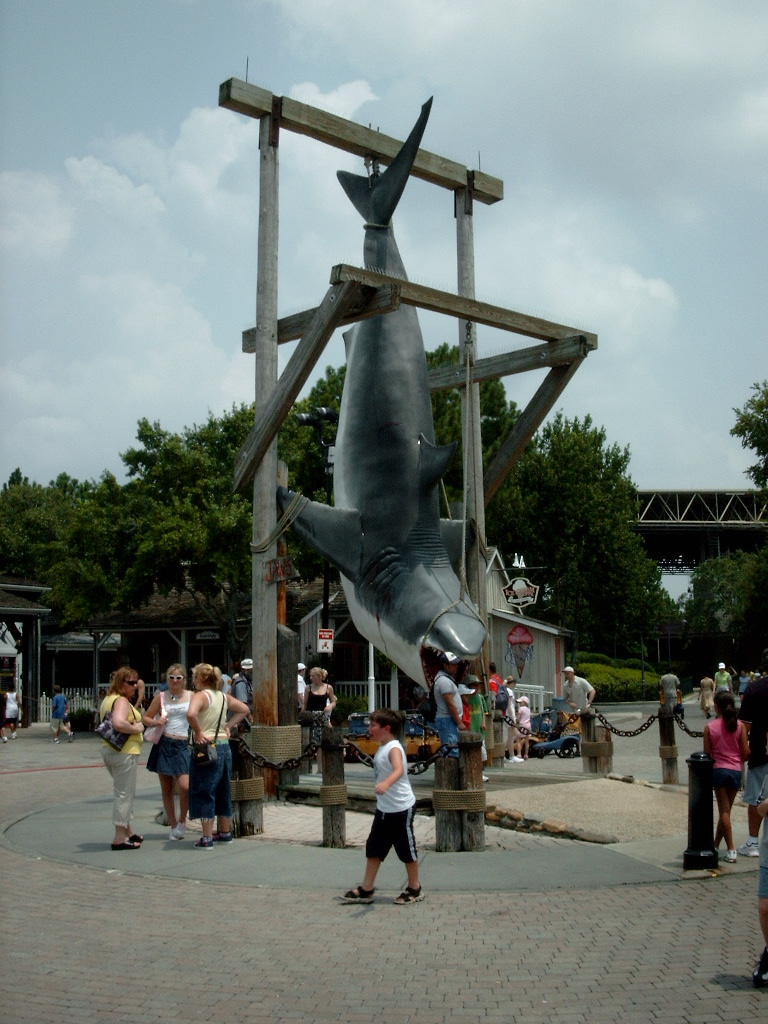
Jaws shark at Universal Studios Florida.

Zanuck and Brown had originally planned to hire John Sturges to direct the film, before considering Dick Richards. However, they grew irritated by Richards' vision of continually calling the shark "the whale"; Richards was subsequently dropped from the project. Zanuck and Brown then signed Spielberg in June 1973 to direct before the release of his first theatrical film, The Sugarland Express. Spielberg wanted to take the novel's basic concept, removing Benchley's many subplots. Zanuck, Brown and Spielberg removed the novel's adulterous affair between Ellen Brody and Matt Hooper because it would compromise the camaraderie between the men when they went out on the Orca.

Peter Benchley wrote three drafts of the screenplay before deciding to bow out of the project. Tony and Pulitzer Prize-winning playwright Howard Sackler happened to be in Los Angeles when the filmmakers began looking for another writer and offered to do an uncredited rewrite, and since the producers and Spielberg were unhappy with Benchley's drafts, they quickly accepted his offer. Spielberg sent the script to Carl Gottlieb, asking for advice. Gottlieb rewrote most scenes during principal photography, and John Milius contributed dialogue polishes. Spielberg has claimed that he prepared his own draft. The authorship of Quint's monologue about the fate of the cruiser USS Indianapolis has caused substantial controversy as to who deserves the most credit for the speech. Spielberg described it as a collaboration among John Milius, Howard Sackler, and actor Robert Shaw. Gottlieb gives primary credit to Shaw, downplaying Milius' contribution.

Three mechanical sharks were made for the production: a full version for underwater shots, one that moved from the camera left to right (with its hidden side completely exposing the internal machinery), and an opposite model with its right flank uncovered. Their construction was supervised by production designer Joe Alves and special effects artist Robert A. Mattey. After the sharks were completed, they were shipped to the shooting location, but had not been tested in water and when placed in the ocean the full model sank to the ocean floor, forcing a team of divers to retrieve it. Location shooting occurred on the island of Martha's Vineyard, Massachusetts, chosen because the ocean had a sandy bottom while 12 miles (19 km) out at sea. This helped the mechanical sharks to operate smoothly and still provide a realistic location. The film nonetheless had a notoriously troubled shoot and went considerably over budget. David Brown said that the budget "was $4 million and the picture wound up costing $9 million". Shooting at sea led to many delays: unwanted sailboats drifted into frame, cameras were soaked, and the Orca once began to sink with the actors on board. The mechanical shark frequently malfunctioned, due to the hydraulic innards being corroded by salt water. The three mechanical sharks were collectively nicknamed "Bruce" by the production team after Spielberg's lawyer. To some degree, the delays in the production proved serendipitous. The script was refined during production, and the unreliable mechanical sharks forced Spielberg to shoot most of the scenes with the shark only hinted at. For example, for much of the shark hunt, its location is represented by the floating yellow barrels. Spielberg also included multiple shots of just the dorsal fin due to its ease of filming. This forced restraint is widely thought to have increased the suspense of these scenes, giving it a Hitchcockian tone.

The studio ordered a sequel early into the success of Jaws. The success of The Godfather Part II and other sequels meant that the producers were under pressure to deliver a bigger and better shark. They realized that someone else would produce the film if they didn't, and they preferred to be in charge of the project themselves. Spielberg declined to be involved in the sequel.

==== Jaws 2 (1978) ====
Like the first film, the production of Jaws 2 was troubled. The original director, John D. Hancock, proved to be unsuitable for an action film and was replaced by Jeannot Szwarc. Scheider, who only reprised his role to end a contractual issue with Universal, was also unhappy during production and had several heated exchanges with Szwarc. Martha's Vineyard was again used as the location for the town scenes. Although some residents guarded their privacy, many islanders welcomed the money that the company was bringing. The majority of filming was at Navarre Beach, Florida, because of the warm weather and the water's depth being appropriate for the shark platform. Like the first film, shooting on water proved challenging. After spending hours anchoring the sailboats, the wind would change as they were ready to shoot, blowing the sails in the wrong direction. The corrosive effect of the saltwater damaged some equipment, including the metal parts in the sharks. As with the first film, footage of real sharks filmed by Australian divers Ron and Valerie Taylor was used for movement shots that could not be convincingly achieved using the mechanical sharks.

The producers of the first two films originally pitched the second Jaws sequel as a spoof named Jaws 3, People 0. National Lampoon writers John Hughes and Todd Carroll were commissioned to write a script. The project was abandoned due to conflicts with Universal Studios.

==== Jaws 3-D (1983) ====
Alan Landsburg and Rupert Hitzig produced the third film. The second sequel capitalized upon the revived interest of 3-D film in the 1980s, amongst other horror films such as Friday the 13th Part III and Amityville 3-D that also made dual use of the number three. As it was Joe Alves' first film as director, having been the production designer for the first two films, he thought that 3-D would "give him an edge". Cinema audiences could wear disposable cardboard polarized glasses to create the illusion that elements penetrate the screen. Richard Matheson worked on the story and script, although many of his contributions were unused: the writer is unhappy with the finished film. Carl Gottlieb, who had also revised the screenplays for the first two Jaws films, was credited for the script alongside Matheson.

==== Jaws: The Revenge (1987) ====
Joseph Sargent produced and directed the fourth film in the series. Jaws: The Revenge was filmed on location in New England and in the Caribbean, and completed on the Universal lot. Like the first two films of the series, Martha's Vineyard was the location of the fictional Amity Island for the opening scenes of the film. Principal photography moved to Nassau in The Bahamas, but the location did not offer the "perfect world" that the 38-day shoot required. The cast and crew encountered many problems with varying weather conditions.

== Reception ==
=== Box office performance ===
Film	U.S. release date	Box office revenue			Budget	Reference
Film	U.S. release date	United States	International	Worldwide	Budget	Reference
Jaws	June 20, 1975	$281,033,300	$216,117,330	$497,150,630	$9,000,000	
Jaws 2	June 16, 1978	$102,922,376	$105,978,000	$208,900,376	$20,000,000	
Jaws 3-D	July 22, 1983	$45,517,055	$42,470,000	$87,987,055	$18,000,000	
Jaws: The Revenge	July 17, 1987	$20,763,013	$31,118,000	$51,881,013	$23,000,000	
Total		$450,235,744	$395,683,330	$845,919,074	$70,000,000	

Jaws was the first film to use "wide release" as a distribution pattern. As such, it is an important film in the history of film distribution and marketing. Prior to the release of Jaws, films typically opened slowly, usually in a few theaters in major cities, which allowed for a series of "premieres." As the success of a film increased, and word of mouth grew, distributors would forward the prints to additional cities across the country. The film became the first to use extensive television advertising. Universal executive Sidney Sheinberg's rationale was that nationwide marketing costs would be amortized at a more favorable rate per print than if a slow, scaled release were carried out. Scheinberg's gamble paid off, with Jaws becoming a box office smash hit and the father of the summer blockbuster.

When Jaws was released on June 20, 1975, it opened at 464 theaters. The release was subsequently expanded on July 25 to a total of 675 theaters, the largest simultaneous distribution of a film in motion picture history at the time. During the first weekend of wide release, Jaws grossed more than $7 million, and was the top grosser for the following five weeks. During its run in theaters, the film became the first to reach more than $100 million in U.S. box office receipts. Jaws eventually grossed more than $470 million worldwide ($1.9 billion in 2010 dollars) and was the highest grossing box office film until Star Wars debuted two years later.

Jaws 2 was the most expensive film that Universal had produced up until that point, costing the studio almost $30 million. According to David Brown, the film made 40% gross of the original. This was attractive to the studio because it reduced market risk. The film became the highest-grossing sequel in history, succeeded by the release of Rocky II in 1979. It opened in 640 theaters, making $9,866,023 in its opening weekend. The final domestic gross for Jaws 2 was $102,922,376, making it the sixth highest domestic grossing film of 1978. Jaws 2 grossed $208 million worldwide.

Jaws 3-D grossed $13,422,500 on its opening weekend, playing at 1,311 theaters at its widest release. It had achieved a total lifetime worldwide gross of $87,987,055. Despite being #1 at the box office, this illustrates the series' diminishing returns, since Jaws 3-D has earned nearly $100,000,000 less than the total lifetime gross of its predecessor and $300,000,000 less than the original film.

The third sequel would attract an even lower income, with around two thirds of Jaws 3-D's total lifetime gross. Jaws: The Revenge received largely negative reviews from critics, and earned the lowest amount of money from the series. It is considered one of the worst movies ever made. The film was a commercial failure, with a worldwide box office take of $51,881,013 and continued the series' diminishing returns. It only grossed $7,154,890 in its opening weekend, when it opened at 1,606 screens. This was around $5 million less than its predecessor. It had also achieved the lowest total lifetime gross of the series.

Jaws, when compared to other top-grossing American horror franchises—Alien vs. Predator, Candyman, Child's Play, The Conjuring, The Exorcist, The Evil Dead, Final Destination, Friday the 13th, Godzilla, Halloween, Hannibal Lecter, Hellraiser, I Know What You Did Last Summer, A Nightmare on Elm Street, The Omen, Paranormal Activity, Psycho, The Purge, Saw, Scream, and The Texas Chainsaw Massacre—is one of the highest grossing horror film franchises in North America.

=== Critical and public response ===
Film	Critical		Public
Film	Rotten Tomatoes	Metacritic	CinemaScore
Jaws	97% (148 reviews)	87 (21 reviews)	—N/a
Jaws 2	56% (43 reviews)	51 (12 reviews)	—N/a
Jaws 3-D	10% (40 reviews)	27 (9 reviews)	D+
Jaws: The Revenge	2% (45 reviews)	15 (15 reviews)	C−

Jaws is regarded as a watershed film in motion picture history, the father of the summer blockbuster movie and one of the first "high concept" films. Due to the film's success in advance screenings, studio executives decided to distribute it in a much wider release than ever before. The Omen followed suit in the summer of 1976 and then Star Wars one year later in 1977, cementing the notion for movie studios to distribute their big-release action and adventure pictures (commonly referred to as tentpole pictures) during the summer. Jaws is widely regarded as one of the greatest films of all time. Jaws was number 48 on American Film Institute's 100 Years... 100 Movies, a list of the greatest American films of all time, dropping down to number 56 on the 10 Year Anniversary list. It was ranked second on a similar list for thrillers, 100 Years... 100 Thrills.

The sequels are not held in such high regard. The reception of Jaws 2 was mixed. While the performances of Scheider, Gary, and Hamilton, the soundtrack by John Williams, were praised. However, the teenagers, who are "irritating and incessantly screaming... don't make for very sympathetic victims." Many reviewers criticized Jaws 2 director Jeannot Szwarc for showing more of the shark than the first film had, reducing the Hitchcockian notion "that the greatest suspense derives from the unseen and the unknown, and that the imagination is capable of conceiving far worse than the materialization of a mere mechanical monster." In retrospect, Jaws 2 had nonetheless been considered to be the best of the three Jaws sequels.

Reception for Jaws 3-D was generally poor. Variety calls it "tepid" and suggests that Alves "fails to linger long enough on the Great White." On Rotten Tomatoes it has an approval rating of 10% based on reviews from 39 critics. The 3-D was criticized as being a gimmick to attract audiences to the aging series and for being ineffective. Derek Winnert says that "with Richard Matheson's name on the script you'd expect a better yarn" although he continues to say that the film "is entirely watchable with a big pack of popcorn."

Jaws: The Revenge attracted the poorest critical reception of the series and was nominated for Worst Picture in the 1987 Golden Raspberry Awards. It was rated by Entertainment Weekly as one of "The 25 Worst Sequels Ever Made." Roger Ebert said that it "is not simply a bad movie, but also a stupid and incompetent one." He lists several elements that he finds unbelievable including that Ellen is "haunted by flashbacks to events where she was not present." Ebert also laments that Michael Caine could not attend the ceremony to collect his Academy Award for Best Supporting Actor earned for Hannah and Her Sisters because of his shooting commitments on this film.

In an era in which documentaries were attempting responsible, accurate reporting about the natural world, ecocriticism says that Hollywood continued to produce films that exploited the fear of animals. Scholar Greg Garrard cites David Ingram's suggestion that the Jaws series "represents a backlash against conservationist ideas in which an 'evil, threatening nature is eventually mastered through male heroism, technology and the blood sacrifice of the wild animal.'" Greg Garrard observes in Jaws: The Revenge that "the marine biologist Mike Brody's environmentalist concerns are effectively ridiculed as his colleague is eaten by the enraged fish; he joins the hunt for it and the shark in turn hunts him down."

=== Accolades ===
Awards and nominations received by the Jaws film series
Award	Category	Film			
Award	Category	Jaws	Jaws 2	Jaws 3-D	Jaws: The Revenge
Academy Awards	Best Picture	Nominated	—	—	—
Academy Awards	Best Original Score	Won	—	—	—
Academy Awards	Best Film Editing	Won	—	—	—
Academy Awards	Best Sound	Won	—	—	—
BAFTA Awards	Best Film	Nominated	—	—	—
BAFTA Awards	Best Direction	Nominated	—	—	—
BAFTA Awards	Best Actor	Nominated	—	—	—
BAFTA Awards	Best Screenplay	Nominated	—	—	—
BAFTA Awards	Anthony Asquith Award for Original Film Music	Won	—	—	—
BAFTA Awards	Best Editing	Nominated	—	—	—
BAFTA Awards	Best Sound	Nominated	—	—	—
Directors Guild of America Awards	Outstanding Directorial Achievement in Motion Pictures	Nominated	—	—	—
Golden Globe Awards	Best Motion Picture – Drama	Nominated	—	—	—
Golden Globe Awards	Best Director	Nominated	—	—	—
Golden Globe Awards	Best Screenplay	Nominated	—	—	—
Golden Globe Awards	Best Original Score	Won	—	—	—
Grammy Awards	Album of Best Original Score Written for a Motion Picture or Television Special	Won	—	—	—
Writers Guild of America Awards	Best Drama Adapted from Another Medium	Nominated	—	—	—

== Music ==
=== Soundtracks ===
Title	U.S. release date	Length	Composer(s)	Label
Jaws: Original Motion Picture Soundtrack	1975	35:12	John Williams	MCA Records
Jaws 2: Original Motion Picture Soundtrack	1978	41:19 (original release), 101:48 (expansion)	John Williams	MCA Records, Intrada Records (expansion)
Jaws 3-D: Original Motion Picture Soundtrack	1983	35:43	Alan Parker	MCA Records, Intrada Records (expansion)
Jaws: The Revenge (Original Motion Picture Soundtrack)	1987	27:20 (promotional), 51:13 (commercial)	Michael Small	N/A (promotional), Intrada Records (commercial)

John Williams composed and conducted the score for the first two films. The main "shark" theme, a simple alternating pattern of two notes, E and F, became a classic piece of suspense music, synonymous with approaching danger. Williams described the theme as having the "effect of grinding away at you, just as a shark would do, instinctual, relentless, unstoppable." When the piece was first played for Spielberg, he was said to have laughed at Williams, thinking that it was a joke. Spielberg later said that without Williams' score the film would have been only half as successful, and Williams acknowledges that the score jumpstarted his career. Williams won an Academy Award for Original Music Score for his work on the first film.

The shark theme is used in all three sequels, a continuity that Williams compares to "the great tradition" for repeating musical themes in Hollywood serials such as Roy Rogers and The Lone Ranger. Alan Parker composed and conducted the score for Jaws 3-D, while the final film was scored by Michael Small. The latter was particularly praised for his work, which many critics considered superior to the film.

== Other media ==
=== Unofficial sequels and rip-offs ===
Many films based on man-eating animals & monsters (usually aquatic) were released throughout the 1970s and the 1980s such as: Son of Blob (also known as Beware! The Blob), Grizzly, Mako: The Jaws of Death, Death Bed: The Bed That Eats, Day of the Animals, Claws, Orca (also known as Orca: The Killer Whale), Eaten Alive, The Pack, Snowbeast, Piranha II: The Spawning, Barracuda, Nightwing, Up from the Depths, Humanoids from the Deep (also known as Monster), Alligator, Blood Beach, Blades, Creature, the Italian-American Tentacles, the Mexican Tintorera (also known as Tintorera: Killer Shark), the French-Italian Killer Fish, the Italian Monster Shark (also known as Devil Fish). The better of these are often considered to be Piranha, as a rip-off, Deep Blood and Great White (also known as The Last Shark), as an unofficial sequel. In 1995, there was also another sequel/rip-off film Cruel Jaws a.k.a. The Beast, which was marketed in some countries as Jaws 5: Cruel Jaws became infamous for illegally incorporated stock footage from the first three official Jaws films into its runtime.

=== Documentaries ===
The Shark Is Still Working is a feature-length documentary film on the impact and legacy of Jaws. It features interviews with a range of cast and crew from the film. It was narrated by the late Roy Scheider and dedicated to the late Peter Benchley.

The documentary was produced by Jaws fans over a seven-year period, building on Laurent Bouzereau's 1995 documentary, The Making of Jaws, that has been included on some laserdisc and DVD releases. Throughout other documentaries over the years, such as Bouzereau's and the BBC's 1997 documentary In the Teeth of Jaws, actor Richard Dreyfuss has recounted tales about the troubled production of Jaws and the quote “The shark is NOT working” which Dreyfuss would hear constantly from members of the crew. Eventually, upon successful attempts to fix the malfunctioning sea monster, Dreyfuss would regularly hear the quote “The shark is working."

The Shark Is Still Working won Best Documentary Feature at the 2010 DocMiami Film Festival. The documentary was released on home video as a special feature on the 2012 Blu-ray edition of Jaws.

Some of the interviews were filmed in 4:3 Academy ratio, typical of TV documentaries of the time. As the production went on, 16:9 became the TV shape standard and so the documentary crops the top and bottom of the image to reshape it to 16:9. There is no anamorphic enhancement of the documentary on the Jaws Blu-ray.

Bouzereau later made the documentary film Jaws @ 50: The Definitive Inside Story, which was released as a bonus feature on the 50th anniversary 4K Blu-ray edition of Jaws.

=== Toys and merchandise ===
A small selection of merchandise from Jaws 2.

Universal "devised and co-ordinated a highly innovative plan" for the first film's distribution and exhibition. The studio and publisher Bantam designed a logo which would appear on both the paperback and on all film advertising. "Both publisher and distributor recognized the mutual benefits that a joint promotion strategy would bring." Producers Zanuck and Brown toured six cities to promote the paperback and the film. Once the film was released, more merchandising was created, including shark-illustrated swimming towels and T-shirts, plastic shark fins for swimmers to wear, and shark-shaped inflatables for them to float on. The Ideal Toy Company produced a game where the player had to use a hook to fish out items from the shark's mouth before the jaws closed. Carl Gottlieb’s 1975 book, The Jaws Log, account of the film's production was also released.

Jaws 2 inspired much more merchandising and sponsors than the first film. Products included sets of trading cards from Topps and Baker's bread, paper cups from Coca-Cola, beach towels, a souvenir program, shark tooth necklaces, coloring and activity books, and a model kit of Brody's truck. A novelization by Hank Searls, based on an earlier draft of the screenplay by Howard Sackler and Dorothy Tristan, was released, as well as Ray Loynd's The Jaws 2 Log, an account of the film's production. Searls also wrote the novelization of Jaws: The Revenge based on an earlier draft of the screenplay by Michael De Guzman.

Lego released a set based on the scene where Bruce attacks the Orca with Chief Martin Brody, Matt Hooper, and Quint. The set was released in August 2024 and features 1,500 pieces.

=== Video games and themed attractions ===
There have been a number of video game releases based upon the franchise. The first, titled Jaws, was released for the Nintendo Entertainment System (NES) in 1987. There was a separate computer adaptation of the original Jaws movie called Jaws: The Computer Game, released in 1989 by Screen 7 for the Amiga and other computers; another unrelated Jaws for the Commodore 64 and other computers was released by Box Office Software the same year. A Jaws level was included in the 2001 game Universal Studios Theme Parks Adventure by Kemco for the GameCube. Jaws Unleashed, developed by Appaloosa Interactive, was released in 2006 for the PlayStation 2, Xbox, and Microsoft Windows. An officially licensed iPhone game based on the original film was released by Bytemark Games and Universal Partnerships & Licensing in 2010, while in 2011 Universal licensed a follow-up game (in the form of an App) called Jaws Revenge. This game was made by Fuse Powered Inc. A game titled Jaws: Ultimate Predator was released on the Wii and Nintendo 3DS in 2011. A virtual pinball game from Zen Studios for Pinball FX 3 was released as well. Stern Pinball also published a Jaws themed pinball cabinet in 2024. A mobile game titled Jaws.io was released on February 14, 2019 for iPhone and Android devices and was published by Universal Studios Interactive Entertainment LLC.

A themed attraction based on the series was opened at Universal Studios Florida in 1990, with a sister attraction opening with Universal Studios Japan in 2001. A similar themed experience featuring the shark from the film was made a permanent part of Universal Studios Hollywood's Studio Tour in 1976. The Florida attraction closed permanently in 2012 while the Japan attraction is still operational.

=== Jaws 19 ===
Jaws 19 is a joke movie that is shown being advertised in the 1989 film Back to the Future Part II. Set in 2015, a movie theatre in Hill Valley features a huge holographic poster of Jaws 19, directed by Max Spielberg (Steven Spielberg's real-life son) that "swallows" Marty McFly, who comments that the shark still looks fake. In 2015, Universal made a poster and trailer for the fictional movie that came with the Back to the Future 30th Anniversary Box-Set.

On 16 September 2015 the fan film named Jaws 19 was released in Russia.
