= Exterminators of the Year 3000 =

1983 film by Giuliano Carnimeo

- Directed by: Giuliano Carnimeo
- Written by: Dardano Sacchetti; Elisa Briganti; Jose Truchado Reyes
- Produced by: Camillo Teti
- Starring: Robert Iannucci; Alicia Moro; Eduardo Fajardo
- Cinematography: Alejandro Ulloa
- Edited by: Adriano Tagliavia; Gianfranco Amicucci
- Music by: Detto Mariano
- Release date: 1983
- Running time: 103 minutes
- Countries: Italy; Spain
- Languages: Italian; English

Exterminators of the Year 3000 (Italian: Il Giustiziere della Strada) is a 1983 Italian-Spanish science fiction action film directed by Giuliano Carmineo. The film is set in a post-apocalyptic future where water is considered a precious substance. A group of people turn towards a stranger to battle a motorcycle gang over an outpost where water is located.

The film has received poor reviews, with TV Guide and The Dissolve describing the film as a Mad Max 2 derivative.

== Cast ==
- Robert Iannucci as Alien
- Alicia Moro as Trash
- Alan Collins as Papillon
- Eduardo Fajardo as Senator
- Fred Harris as Crazy Bull
- Beryl Cunningham as Shadow
- Luca Venantini as Tommy
- Anna Orso as Linda
- Venantino Venantini as John

== Production ==
Exterminators of the Year 3000 was shot in Italy and Spain by director Giuliano Carnimeo who is credited under the name Jules Harrison. Actor Robert Iannucci had stated that the writers and director had limited command of English, but would not let the actors change their lines to make them sound more realistic.

== Release ==
The film was initially released in 1983.

=== Home video ===
Code Red released the film on DVD on September 21, 2010. This DVD included an interview and audio commentary from Robert Iannucci. The film was released later on Blu-ray by Shout! Factory with the previously mentioned bonus features. Shout! Factory initially were going to release the film as a double feature with the film Cruel Jaws, but after finding that the film utilized footage from the Jaws series and other films, Exterminators of the Year 3000 was released as a standalone film.

== Reception ==
AllMovie gave the film one and a half stars out of five, referring to it as a "feeble sci-fi road film has gangs on motorbikes or driving 1,000-year-old cars from the 1970s in perfect running order, at war for water, a rare commodity." TV Guide gave the film one star out of five, referring to it as "another idiotic Road Warrior rip-off" that was "dubbed badly into English".

The Dissolve gave the film a two out of five rating, referring to it as a "mostly a mediocre Road Warrior copy" stating that "In the Mad Max movies, this premise had sociopolitical connotations, and shaped a hero with a tragic backstory. In Exterminators, Alien has no real character arc. The breakdown of society is just another occasion for violence." The review went on to note that a third of the film's "appeal derives from its cheesiness", while "another third comes some of the more eye-popping stunts" and that "The rest of what makes Exterminators Of The Year 3000 watchable is its dogged adherence to its era's trends. From the subterranean cities to the tricked-out vehicles racing through flatlands, Exterminators is a compendium of what B-movie producers thought was nifty and/or potentially popular in the early 1980s." and that "In the end, it’s not that the movie is “so bad it’s good,” so much as that it's so derivative, it's fascinating."

== See also ==
- List of Italian films of 1983
- Mad Max series legacy and influence in popular culture
