= A Little Game =

A Little Game may refer to:

- A Little Game (1971 film)
- A Little Game (2014 film)
