= Cruel Jaws =

1995 Italian horror film

- Promotional release poster
- Directed by: Bruno Mattei
- Screenplay by: Robert Feen; Bruno Mattei; Linda Morrison
- Produced by: John Kent
- Starring: David Luther; George Barnes, Jr.; Scott Silveria; Kristen Urso; Richard Dew; Sky Palma; Norma-Jean Nesheim
- Cinematography: Luigi Ciccarese; Ben Jackson
- Edited by: Bruno Mattei
- Music by: Michael Morahan
- Distributed by: VPS Video (Germany); Beam Entertainment (Japan); Teliwa (Malaysia); DMEG (Sweden); Severin Films (USA)
- Release date: September 26, 1995
- Running time: 93 minutes (USA); 96 minutes (Japan)
- Country: Italy
- Language: English

Cruel Jaws (also known as Jaws 5 and The Beast) is a 1995 English-language Italian horror film directed by Bruno Mattei (under the pseudonym ‘William Snyder’). The film utilizes unauthorized footage from the Jaws film series and the 1981 Italian knockoff The Last Shark, as well as the 1989 Italian knockoff Deep Blood, and was marketed in some regions as a sequel, though it has no official or narrative connections to the franchise.

The film was shot in Florida, including at the Theater of the Sea marine theme park in Islamorada. It was released direct-to-video on VHS and DVD in relative obscurity, mostly outside of the United States.

== Plot ==
When a military ship named the Cleveland crashes, two divers named Paco and Jose search it and are killed by a large tiger shark. The shark also kills their captain, Ramone.

Meanwhile in Hampton Bay, Florida, aquarist Dag Soerenson, who runs an aquarium alongside his sons Bob and Larry, is trying to stop bigwig Samuel Lewis from shutting things down due to months of unpaid rent. On the beach, the body of one of the Cleveland divers is discovered. Police chief Francis Berger and fish expert Bill Morrison bring it in to perform an autopsy where they determine that a large shark indeed attacked the diver, but Lewis and the Mayor Godfrey disagree and don’t bother to postpone the upcoming Regatta. One night, at Old Beach, a woman, Katie Adams, and her boyfriend Dan go swimming and Katie is killed by the shark. Berger tries to reason with the mayor but he still refuses.

A few shark proof gates are placed and the shark is apparently killed but Bill doesn’t agree. Even when Ramone’s broken boat shows up they still go on with the Regatta. The shark breaks through and kills many surfers. When the shark breaks the pier, it kills nearly everyone who falls in the water. It also causes Dag’s daughter Susy, a wheelchair user, to fall in the ocean. Bill’s girlfriend Vanessa jumps in to save her and is devoured. Lewis offers up a reward and is revealed to be working with the Mafia. His son Ronnie goes out and tries to kill the shark but is terrified when it appears, this causes him to fall in the water and the shark devours him. His friends die by blowing up the boat by accident. Berger goes out to kill the shark but the shark is revealed to be too large to kill using the helicopter. The shark takes the helicopter out of the sky and devours Berger and the pilot. Bill explains that the Cleveland, that crashed in an area called Cape Farrows, was carrying the shark which was trained as top-secret Navy material to attack the enemy. The Mafia boss sends two thugs out to kill the shark, but they go to Cape Farrows to explore the Cleveland when they steal Bill’s map to the wreck’s location. During this, they are both devoured.

Dag, Bill, Bob and Larry sail to the Cleveland where they load the wreck with dynamite and blow it up which kills the shark. Dag wins the reward which allows him to pay rent for the aquarium.

== Cast ==
- Richard Dew as Dag Soerensen
- David Luther as Francis Berger
- George Barnes, Jr. as Samuel Lewis
- Scott Silveria as Bob Soerensen
- Kristen Urso as Susy Soerensen
- Sky Palma as Glenda
- Norma J. Nesheim as Vanessa
- Gregg Hood as Bill Morrison
- Carter Collins as Ronnie Lewis
- Natasha Etzer as Gloria Lewis
- Larry Zience as Larry
- Jay Colligan as Tommy

== Production ==
Due to the low budget, the movie heavily utilizes footage from all four movies of the Jaws film series, as well as the Italian films Deep Blood (basically the entire climax of the movie) and Great White.

Even though Michael Morahan is the credited composer, the movie’s soundtrack consists entirely of stock music. One piece, Excellence by Wolfgang Kafer, notoriously utilises the theme from Star Wars. One of the shark’s motifs is the soundtrack of the movie Curse II: The Bite. Coincidentally, that movie’s composer Carlo Maria Cordio scored Deep Blood.

== Reception ==
Dread Central wrote: "Releasing this as Jaws 5 in some territories was fitting because that series was all about diminishing returns and I can safely say Jaws 4: The Revenge (1987) looks like a masterpiece next to this."

== Home media ==
The film was released on DVD in Europe in 2009. A Blu-ray release from Scream Factory was planned (packaged as a double feature with Exterminators of the Year 3000), but ultimately cancelled due to the film's unauthorized use of footage from the Jaws franchise and other shark movies. The film was officially released on Blu-ray and DVD in the US on September 29, 2020 by Severin Films.

== Documentary ==
In 2024, a documentary about the film was announced, titled Twilight Jaws. It features interviews with the original cast and focuses on the film's cult status and its numerous legal issues.

== See also ==
- List of killer shark films

== Other sources ==
- "El Portal lends aura to Cruel Jaws crew: Shady hamlet is thriller's backdrop". The Miami Herald. The McClatchy Company. December 4, 1994. p. 2 (Neighbors).
