= Lee Fierro =

American actress (1929–2020)

- Born: Elizabeth Lee Beers; February 13, 1929; New York City, U.S.
- Died: April 5, 2020 (aged 91); Aurora, Ohio, U.S.
- Occupation: Actress
- Years active: 1975–2016
- Known for: Mrs. Kintner in Jaws

Elizabeth Lee Fierro (February 13, 1929 – April 5, 2020) was an American actress and theater promoter best known for playing Mrs. Kintner in the Jaws film franchise.

== Personal life and career ==
She was born in 1929 in New York as Elizabeth Lee Beers. Her father was an architect.

In 1949, she married the actor Marvin Stephens. The marriage produced four children. The family moved to Pennsylvania, where she joined the ensemble of the Hedgerow Repertory Theatre in Rose Valley. As she had little time for theatre performances as a mother, she began to give acting lessons. Occasionally, she also directed theatre productions.

After her divorce from Stephens, she married Bernard Fierro, with whom she had another child. She first visited Martha's Vineyard in 1965 and settled there with her family in 1969, by which time she was no longer acting and was mainly working as a childbirth educator.

Although Fierro had only training as an actress in theater but not as a screen actress, she was cast as Mrs. Kintner in Steven Spielberg's 1975 film Jaws. In a now famous scene she slaps the police chief, played by Roy Scheider. The scene required several takes. Fierro recalled slapping the actor playing the police chief 17 times, saying "I slapped him hard with a loose wrist, which was what I was taught in acting school." Fierro reportedly had also "objected to the profanity" of the scene's dialogue as originally drafted, and the director, Steven Spielberg, wanted dialogue that accorded with Fierro's "everywoman looks," so the scene's dialogue was rewritten the day before it was filmed.

From 1974 to 2017 Fierro was artistic director of the Island Theatre Workshop in Martha's Vineyard, where she mentored hundreds of aspiring actors. Kevin Ryan, the Theater's board president in 2020, who had worked with her for 30 years, estimated that Fierro had mentored and taught theater to more than 1,000 children, and recalled Fierro as "fiercely dedicated to the mission of teaching. She, no matter what it was, would stay at it and get the job done."

In 2013, Fierro received a "Woman of the Year" award by Women Empowered to Make Healthy Choices for her local theater workshop.

In mid-2017, Fierro moved to Aurora, Ohio, to an assisted living facility, to be closer to her family.

Fierro died from COVID-19 on April 5, 2020, aged 91.

== Filmography ==
Film
Year	Title	Role	Notes
1975	Jaws	Mrs. Kintner	
1987	Jaws: The Revenge	Mrs. Kintner	misspelled as "Mrs. Kitner" in credits
2016	The Mistover Tale	Priscilla Goodrich	(final film role)
