= Fritzi Jane Courtney =

American actress

- Born: Freda Jassem; February 15, 1923; Harlem, New York
- Died: August 7, 2012 (aged 89); Portland, Maine
- Other names: Freda Cohen
- Occupation: Actress
- Spouse: Robert 'Bob' Cohen
- Children: 1
- Parents: Joseph Jassem (father); Rose Jassem (mother)

Fritzi Jane Courtney (February 15, 1923 – August 7, 2012) was an American actress.

The only daughter of Joseph and Rose Jassem, she was born in Harlem and was raised in Brooklyn. She graduated from Brooklyn College. While attending drama school, she was employed by a tie company in New York City.

She met her future husband, Robert Cohen at a USO during World War II. In 1946, the couple moved to Maine. They were the parents of one daughter, Jill S. Cohen.

While working for NBC affiliate, Channel 6, Fritzi became the first woman on-air drama critic in New England, reviewing theatrical productions.

She is best known for playing Mrs. Taft, the hotel owner, in three Jaws films. She played Mrs. Taft in Jaws (1975), then reprised her role in two sequels – Jaws 2 (1978) and again in Jaws: The Revenge (1987).

On August 7, 2012, Fritzi died at her residence in Portland, Maine. She was 89 years old.

== Filmography ==
- Route 66 (1963, TV Series) as Librarian (uncredited)
- Jaws (1975) as Mrs. Taft (uncredited)
- Jaws 2 (1978) as Mrs. Taft
- Spraggue (1984, TV Movie) as Judge
- Jaws: The Revenge (1987) as Mrs. Taft
