= Jaws 2 =

1978 American thriller film by Jeannot Szwarc

- Theatrical release poster by Lou Feck
- Directed by: Jeannot Szwarc
- Written by: Carl Gottlieb; Howard Sackler
- Based on: Characters by Peter Benchley
- Produced by: Richard D. Zanuck; David Brown
- Starring: Roy Scheider; Lorraine Gary; Murray Hamilton
- Cinematography: Michael Butler
- Edited by: Neil Travis; Steve Potter; Arthur Schmidt
- Music by: John Williams
- Production companies: Zanuck/Brown Company; Universal Pictures
- Distributed by: Universal Pictures
- Release date: June 16, 1978
- Running time: 116 minutes
- Country: United States
- Language: English
- Budget: $20 million
- Box office: $208.9 million

Jaws 2 is a 1978 American thriller film directed by Jeannot Szwarc and written by Howard Sackler and Carl Gottlieb. It is the sequel to Steven Spielberg's Jaws (1975), and the second installment in the Jaws franchise. The film stars Roy Scheider as Police Chief Martin Brody, with Lorraine Gary, Murray Hamilton and Jeffrey Kramer reprising their respective roles as Martin's wife Ellen Brody, mayor Larry Vaughn and Deputy Hendricks. It also stars Joseph Mascolo, Collin Wilcox, Ann Dusenberry, Mark Gruner, Susan French, Barry Coe, Donna Wilkes, Gary Springer, and Keith Gordon in his first feature film role. The plot concerns Police Chief Martin Brody suspecting another great white shark is terrorizing the fictional seaside resort community of Amity Island, following a series of incidents and disappearances, and his suspicions are eventually proven true.

Like the production of the original film, the production of Jaws 2 was troubled. The first director for the film, John D. Hancock, proved to be unsuitable for directing an action film and was replaced by Szwarc. Scheider agreed to reprise his role only to settle a contractual issue with Universal Pictures, was unhappy during production and had several heated exchanges with Szwarc.

The film was released on June 16, 1978, to mixed reviews. While the performances of Scheider, Gary and Hamilton, the special effects, and John Williams' musical score were praised, it received criticism for essentially duplicating the formula of the first film. However, in retrospect, the film is generally regarded as the best of the three Jaws sequels. It was briefly the highest-grossing sequel in history until Rocky II was released in 1979. The film's tagline, "Just when you thought it was safe to go back in the water..." has become one of the most famous in film history and has been parodied and homaged several times. It was followed by Jaws 3-D in 1983.

== Plot ==
Four years after the killing of the shark in the first film, another great white shark kills two scuba divers photographing the wreckage of the Orca. Their camera and exposed film is later recovered by Deputy Jeff Hendricks. The shark next kills a water skier and the pilot of the boat, who uses a flare gun in self-defense; however, the boat explodes, killing the pilot and severely burning the shark's face.

When an orca carcass is found on the beach, Police Chief Martin Brody believes that a shark is responsible. Brody is attempts to contact oceanographer Matt Hooper, and Mayor Larry Vaughn urges him not to press the issue, concerned about Brody's mental state and worried about jeopardizing the island's tourism and new development plans. Concerned for his family's safety, Brody forbids his 17-year-old son Mike from going on the water. Brody watches the beach from an observation tower and causes a panic after mistaking a school of bluefish for a shark and shooting at it. When photos from the diver's camera are processed, and one of them shows a closeup of the shark's face, he presents the photo evidence to the Amity Town Council. Developer Len Peterson dismisses his concerns, and the council votes to remove Brody as police chief.

Mike defies his father's orders and goes sailing with his 9-year-old brother Sean, Marge, another teen, and a group of friends. They head out on six boats past a team of divers led by instructor Tom Andrews. Shortly after submerging, Andrews encounters the shark in a kelp forest. Panicking, he rushes to the surface, causing a bends attack and an embolism. The shark hits the boat of teenage couple Eddie Marchand and Tina Wilcox, who separate themselves from the main group, and the shark kills Eddie.

Brody and his wife Ellen witness Tom's evacuation by ambulance and learn the other divers suspect something scared him into ascending too fast. Hendricks, Brody's replacement as police chief, tells them Mike is still on the water with his friends. Brody and Ellen commandeer the police boat, aided by Hendricks, to rescue them. They come across Tina's boat, where she tearfully confirms the shark's presence. Brody hails a passing boat to take Hendricks, Ellen, and Tina back to shore while he searches for the others.

The shark attacks the group's boats, which collide and capsize. Mike is knocked into the water unconscious. The only seaworthy boat left retrieves Mike and leave the others to take him ashore. A Harbor Patrol helicopter Brody summoned arrives to tow them to Cable Junction, a small rocky island which houses an electrical relay station supplying power to Amity. The shark surfaces and latches onto the chopper's pontoons, capsizing it and drowning the pilot. The shark knocks Sean into the water, and kills Marge.

Brody sends Mike to safety and finds the others at Cable Junction. Their cheering and jumping attracts the shark, and Brody crashed the police boat on the rocks. Using an inflatable raft, he taps an underwater power cable with an oar to lure the shark toward him. The shark bites the cable and is electrocuted. Brody and the other survivors gather on Cable Junction to await rescue.

== Cast ==
- Roy Scheider as Police Chief Martin Brody
- Lorraine Gary as Ellen Brody
- Murray Hamilton as Mayor Larry Vaughn
- Joseph Mascolo as Len Peterson
- Jeffrey Kramer as Deputy Jeff Hendricks
- Collin Wilcox as Dr. Elkins
- Ann Dusenberry as Tina Wilcox
- Mark Gruner as Michael "Mike" Brody
- Susan French as Elderly Woman
- Barry Coe as Thomas "Tom" Andrews
- Gary Springer as Andy Nicholas
- Donna Wilkes as Jackie Peters
- Gary Dubin as Eddie Marchand
- John Dukakis as Paul 'Polo' Loman
- G. Thomas Dunlop as Timmy Weldon
- David Elliott as Larry Vaughn, Jr.
- Marc Gilpin as Sean Brody
- Keith Gordon as Doug Fetterman
- Cynthia Grover as Lucy
- Ben Marley as Patrick
- Martha Swatek as Marge
- Billy Van Zandt as Bob
- Gigi Vorgan as Brooke Peters
- Fritzi Jane Courtney as Mrs. Taft
- Coll Red McLean as Red
- Al Wilde as Harry Wiseman
- Cyprian R. Dube as Mr. Posner
- Jerry M. Baxter as helicopter pilot
- Jean Coulter as ski boat driver
- Christine Freeman as water skier
- Herb Muller as Phil Fogerty
- David Owsley McMillan as Donnie
- Susan Owsley McMillan as Denise
- April Gilpin as Renee

== Production ==
=== Development and writing ===
Universal wanted a sequel to Jaws early into the success of the original film. Producers David Brown and Richard D. Zanuck realized that someone else would produce the film if they did not, and preferred to be in charge of the project themselves.

In October 1975, Steven Spielberg told the San Francisco Film Festival that "making a sequel to anything is just a cheap carny trick" and that he did not even respond to the producers when they asked him to direct Jaws 2. He claimed that the planned plot was to involve the sons of Quint (Robert Shaw) and Martin Brody (Roy Scheider) hunting a new shark. Brown said that Spielberg did not want to direct the sequel because he felt that he had done the "definitive shark movie". The director later added that his decision was influenced by the problems the Jaws production faced – "I would have done the sequel if I hadn't had such a horrible time at sea on the first film."

Despite Spielberg's rejection, the studio went ahead with plans to make the sequel, leading to an arduous 18-month pre-production process. Howard Sackler, who had contributed to the first film's script but chose not to be credited, was charged with writing the first draft. He originally proposed a prequel based on the sinking of the USS Indianapolis, the story relayed by Quint in the first film. Although Universal president Sidney Sheinberg thought Sackler's treatment for the film was intriguing, he rejected the idea. On Sackler's recommendation, theatre and film director John D. Hancock was chosen to helm the picture.

Hancock began filming in June 1977. However, after nearly a month of filming, Universal and MCA executives disliked the dark, subtle tone that the film was taking and wanted a more lighthearted and action-oriented story. Additionally, Hancock ran into trouble with Sheinberg, who suggested to Hancock and Tristan that his (Sheinberg's) wife, actress Lorraine Gary (Ellen Brody), "should go out on a boat and help to rescue the kids." When told of the idea, Zanuck replied, "Over my dead body." The next draft of the film's screenplay was turned in with Gary not going out to sea. Hancock says that this, and his later firing of another actress who turned out to be a Universal executive's girlfriend, contributed to his own dismissal from the film.

Hancock began to feel the pressure of directing his first epic adventure film "with only three film credits, and all small-scale dramas". The producers were unhappy with his material, and on a Saturday evening in June 1977, after a meeting with the producers and Universal executives, the director was fired. He and his wife Dorothy Tristan left for Rome and production was shut down for a few weeks. The couple had been involved in the film for eighteen months. Hancock blamed his departure on the mechanical shark, telling a newspaper that it still could not swim or bite after a year and a half: "You get a couple of shots, and [the shark] breaks." Echoing the first film's production, Carl Gottlieb was enlisted to further revise the script, adding humor and reducing some of the violence. Gottlieb wrote on location at Fort Walton Beach, Florida. It cost the producers more money to hire Gottlieb to do the rewrite than it would have if they had hired him in the first place.

At this point, Spielberg considered returning to direct the sequel. Over the Bicentennial weekend in 1976, Spielberg had hammered out a screenplay based on Quint's Indianapolis speech. Because of his contract for Close Encounters of the Third Kind, however, Spielberg would not be able to work on the film for a further year and the producers could not wait for him to be free. Production designer Joe Alves (who would direct Jaws 3-D) and Verna Fields (who had been promoted to vice-president at Universal after her acclaimed editing on the first film) proposed that they co-direct it. The request was declined by the Directors Guild of America, partly because they would not allow a DGA member to be replaced by someone who was not one of its members, and partly because they, in the wake of events on the set of The Outlaw Josey Wales, had instituted a ban on any cast or crew members taking over as director during a film's production. The reins were eventually handed to Jeannot Szwarc, best known for the film Bug and whom Alves knew from working on the TV series Night Gallery. Szwarc recommenced production by filming the complicated water skiing scene, giving Gottlieb some time to complete the script. He reinstated the character of Deputy Jeff Hendricks, played by Jeffrey Kramer, who had been missing from the earlier script. Many of the teenagers were sacked, with the remaining roles developed.

Three new mechanical sharks were constructed for the film. The first was the "platform shark", also referred to as the "luxurious shark". Special mechanical effects supervisor Robert Mattey and Roy Arbogast used the same body mold used for the shark in the first film. The production had planned to refurbish and use the sharks from the original film, but it was discovered they had rusted and rotted away after having been stored behind sheds on the lower lot of Universal Studios in the intervening years. The only pieces that were salvageable were the bare frames, made from chromoly tubing. Mattey's design was much more complicated and ambitious than the first film. The same (male) body was used, but a brand new head was made by sculptor Chris Mueller which made use of an all-new mouth mechanism, one which incorporated jowls to disguise the pinching of the cheeks that had proven to be a problem with the shark in the original film. The sharks for Jaws 2 were known as "Bruce Two" (the sharks for the original film had been nicknamed "Bruce", after Spielberg's lawyer Bruce Ramer), but on set they were referred to as "Fidel" and "Harold", the latter after David Brown's Beverly Hills lawyer. The other shark props used were a fin and a full shark, both of which could be pulled by boats. "Cable Junction", the island shown in the film's climax, was actually a floating barge covered with fiber-glass rocks. This was created in order to enable the shark platform to be positioned to it as close as possible (a real island would have hindered this due to the upward slope of the seabed making the shark platform visible). Like the first film, footage of real sharks filmed by Australian divers Ron and Valerie Taylor was used for movement shots that could not be convincingly achieved using the mechanical sharks.

Although the first film was commended for leaving the shark to the imagination until two thirds of the way through, Szwarc felt that they should show it as much as possible because the dramatic "first image of it coming out of the water" in the first film could never be repeated. Szwarc believed that the reduction of the first film's Hitchcockian suspense was inevitable because the audience already knew what the shark looked like from the first film. Reviewers have since commented that there was no way that they were ever going to duplicate the original's effectiveness. The filmmakers gave the new shark a more menacing look by scarring it in the early boat explosion.

Like the previous film, filming on the ocean proved challenging. Scheider said that they were "always contending with tides, surf and winds ... jellyfish, sharks, waterspouts and hurricane warnings." After spending hours anchoring the sailboats, the wind would change as they were ready to shoot, blowing the sails in the wrong direction. As in the first film, the saltwater's corrosive effect damaged the metal parts in the mechanical sharks, and some other equipment.

Susan Ford, daughter of U.S. President Gerald Ford, was hired to shoot publicity photographs. Many of these photos appeared in Ray Loynd's Jaws 2 Log, which documented the film's production, similar to the Jaws Log, a best-selling book written by Carl Gottlieb covering production of the first film.

=== Location ===
Martha's Vineyard was again used as the location for the town scenes and Navarre Beach, FL was included for the opening scenes with the Gulf Breeze High School band playing for the ribbon cutting scene. Although some residents guarded their privacy, many islanders welcomed the money that the company was bringing. Shortly after the production arrived in June 1977, local newspaper the Grapevine wrote:

The Jaws people are back among us, more efficient, more organized and more moneyed. Gone are the happy-go-lucky days of the first Jaws, where the big trucks roved about the Island from day to day, always highly visible with miles of cables snaking here and there over roads and lawns. Gone are the acrimonious wrangles and Select persons over noise and zoning regulations and this and that. What is still here is money—about $2 million of it.

Many residents enjoyed being cast as extras. Some people, however, were less pleased by the film crew's presence and refused to cooperate. Only one drugstore allowed its windows to be boarded up for the moody look that Hancock wanted. "Universal Go Home" T-shirts began appearing on the streets in mid-June 1977.

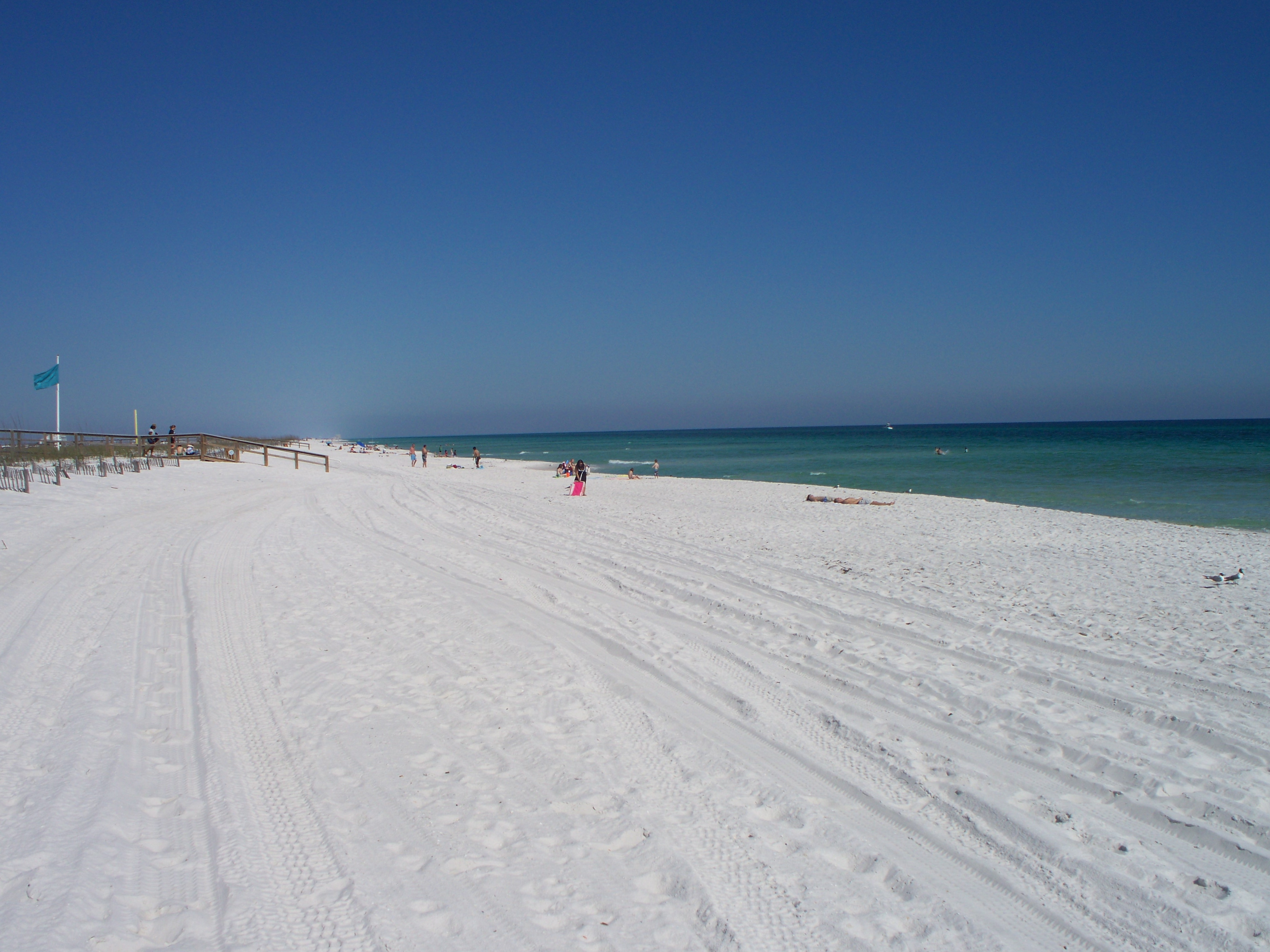
The majority of filming was at Navarre Beach in Florida

When Szwarc took over, the majority of the film was shot at Navarre Beach in Florida, because the weather was warm and the water was deep enough for the shark platform. The company was at this location from August 1 until December 22, 1977. The production "was a boost to the local economy because local boaters, extras and stand-ins or doubles were hired. Universal brought in actors, directors, producers and their wives, camera and crew people who needed housing, food and clothing for the movie. Services were needed for laundry, dry-cleaning and recreation." Navarre's Holiday Inn "Holidome" was used as the film's headquarters, with the ground floor converted into production offices, and some of the Gulf-front suites remodeled for David Brown and Roy Scheider. Universal rented 100 of the hotel's 200 rooms, spending $1 million. The Holiday Inn was destroyed in the 2004 Atlantic hurricane season. Boats and parts for their maintenance were purchased from local businesses. One proprietor said that he sold "Universal approximately $400,000 worth of boats and equipment".

On one occasion, the Cable Junction Island set, which was built on a barge, broke loose from its anchorage and had to be rescued. Szwarc was contacted one night and told that his island was drifting towards Cuba. Real hammerhead sharks circled the teen actors during the filming of one shot. Because the characters they were playing were meant to be in distress, the crew (filming from a distance) did not realize that the actors were genuinely calling for help.

The interior shots of the teen hang-out where they play pinball were filmed in the original location of the Hog's Breath Saloon on Okaloosa Island. This restaurant later relocated to Destin, Florida as its original building was susceptible to hurricane damage. The production company had to seek dredge and fill permits from Florida's Department of Environmental Regulation to sink the revised platform that controlled the shark on the sea bottom.

Principal photography ended three days before Christmas 1977, on the Choctawhatchee Bay, near Destin, Florida. The actors had to put ice cubes in their mouths to prevent their breath showing on camera. The final sequence to be filmed was the shark being electrocuted on the cable. In mid-January, the crew reconvened in Hollywood with some of the teenage actors for five weeks of post-production photography.

Jaws 2 cost $30 million to produce, over three times more than the original. David Brown says that they did not budget the film "because Universal would never have given a green light to a $30 million budget in those days." The Marine Division Head for Universal on location, Philip Kingry, says that "It cost approximately $80,000 per day to make that movie." When Kingry asked Brown what his budget was, the producer responded, "We're not wasteful, but we're spending the profit from Jaws, and it will take what it takes."

=== Casting ===
Roy Scheider reluctantly returned to reprise his role as Martin Brody. In 1977, he had quit the role of Michael Vronsky in The Deer Hunter two weeks before the start of filming because of "creative differences". Scheider was contracted to Universal at the time for a three-picture deal, but the studio offered to forgive his failure to fulfill his contractual obligation if he agreed to appear in Jaws 2. The actor heavily resisted the film, claiming that there was nothing new to create and that people would be watching the film to see the shark, not him. According to his biographer, Scheider was so desperate to be relieved from the role that he "pleaded insanity and went crazy in The Beverly Hills Hotel". However, he was given an attractive financial package for appearing in Jaws 2; he quadrupled his base salary from the first film, and negotiated points (a percentage of the film's net profits). The Star newspaper reported that Scheider received $500,000 for 12 weeks’ work, plus $35,000 for each additional week that the schedule ran over.

Despite his reluctance, Scheider pledged to do the best job that he could, wanting to make Brody believable. Scheider is quoted in Ray Loynd's book The Jaws 2 Log, saying, "When Conan Doyle wrote the first Sherlock Holmes and everyone screamed for more, I don’t think he felt like a professional hack. I see nothing wrong with bringing back a story that gives people a terrific time".

The atmosphere was tense on the set, and Scheider often argued with Szwarc. On one occasion, Scheider complained (in front of extras) that Szwarc was wasting time with technical issues and the extras while ignoring the principal actors. A meeting was called with the two, David Brown and Verna Fields, in which Scheider and Szwarc were encouraged to settle their differences. The discussion became heated and a physical fight broke out, which Brown and Fields broke up. The rift was also articulated in written correspondence. In a letter to Szwarc, Scheider wrote that "working with Jeannot Szwarc is knowing he will never say he is sorry or ever admitting he overlooked something. Well, enough of that shit for me!" He requested an apology from the director for not consulting him. Szwarc's reply focused upon completing the film to the "best possible" standard:

Time and pressure are part of my reality and priorities something I must deal with.

You have been consulted and your suggestions made part of my scenes many times, whenever they did not contradict the overall concept of the picture.

If you have to be offended, I deplore it, for no offense was meant. At this point in the game, your feelings or my feelings are immaterial and irrelevant, the picture is all that matters.

Sincerely, Jeannot

Richard Dreyfuss, who played Matt Hooper in Jaws, said he chose not to return in Jaws 2 because Spielberg was not directing.

Many extras were recruited from Gulf Breeze High School. The students were paid $3 per hour, well above the minimum wage at the time ($2.30/hr), and reveled in being able to miss classes. Casting director Shari Rhodes requested members of the Gulf Breeze band perform as the Amity High School Band, seen in an early scene in the film showing the opening of the Holiday Inn Amity Shores "Amity Scholarship Fund Benefit". "The GBHS band consisted of approximately 100 members, and band director John Henley chose 28 student musicians, including the band's section known as Henley's Honkers." Universal scheduled their involvement for mid-afternoons to prevent their missing too much time in school. Universal made a contribution of $3,500 to the school and the band for their part in the film. Several other GBHS students were hired as stand-ins or doubles for the teenage actors to appear in the water scenes and to maintain and sail the boats.

== Music ==
Jaws 2: Original Motion Picture Soundtrack

Film score by John Williams
- Released: 1978, 2015 (expansion)
- Recorded: 20th Century Fox Studios, Stage One
- Genres: Film score, Classical
- Length: 41:19 (original release), 101:48 (expansion)
- Labels: MCA Records (original release), Varèse Sarabande (CD release), Intrada Records (expansion)
- Producer: John Williams

John Williams chronology
Close Encounters of the Third Kind (1977)	Jaws 2: Original Motion Picture Soundtrack (1978)	Superman (1978)

Professional ratings
Review scores
Source	Rating
AllMusic	4/5 stars
Filmtracks	4/5 stars
Music from the Movies	4/5 stars

John Williams returned to score Jaws 2 after winning an Academy Award for Best Original Score for his work on the first film. Williams says that it was assumed by everyone that "the music would come back also and be part of the cast ... it would require new music, certainly, but the signature music of Jaws should be used as well". He compares this to "the great tradition" for repeating musical themes in Hollywood serials such as Roy Rogers and The Lone Ranger. In addition to the familiar themes, Szwarc says Williams also composed a "youthful counterpoint to the shark that is always around when the kids are sailing or going out to sea. It was very inventive".

Szwarc said that the sequel's music should be "more complex because it was a more complex film". Williams says that this score is broader, allowing him to make more use of the orchestra, and use longer notes, and "fill the space" created by the director. Williams used a larger ensemble than for the first film, and "the orchestral palette may have been broader or had longer notes". Delays in shooting meant that Williams was forced to start working on the score before the film was completed. Szwarc discussed the film with the composer, showing him edited sequences and storyboards. The director praises Williams in being able to work under such difficult conditions. Critic Mike Beek suggests these time constraints enabled Williams "to create themes based on ideas and suggestions, rather than a locked down print."

Critics have praised Williams' score, comparing it favorably to the original. Williams "uses a few basic elements of the original—the obligatory shark motif, for one—and takes the music off in some new and interesting directions." The score is "more disturbing in places" than the original, and "Williams fashion [sic] some new and hugely memorable out to sea adventure music." Because Jaws 2 "isn't a film that requires subtlety ... Williams pulls out all the stops to make it as exciting and hair raising as possible." Comparing the sequel to the original, Fanfare's Arthur Lintgen writes: "Jaws 2 is a more expansive, softer edged, Romantic, even Impressionistic score emphasizing the sea as a pictorial backdrop. Both scores are masterpieces in their own separate ways."

According to the liner notes on the soundtrack album, Williams' "sense of the dramatic, coupled with his exquisite musical taste and knowledge of the orchestra definitely stamp this score as truly one of his best." It is "brilliantly performed by a mini-symphony made up of the finest instrumentalists to be found anywhere." Mike Beek makes positive comments about the film, saying that "the music certainly elevates it to a level it would otherwise never have achieved."

In 2015, Intrada Records issued a two-disc edition with Williams' complete score in chronological order on the first disc and the original 1978 soundtrack album on the second. A remaster of this album released in 2026.

== Release ==
=== Theatrical ===
Jaws 2 had sneak previews at 31 theaters across the United States on June 2, 1978, including at Loew's State II in New York City, before opening June 16.

=== Home media ===
In 1980, MCA Home Video (then known as MCA Videocassette Inc.) released Jaws 2 on VHS, Betamax and LaserDisc, following its 1980 theatrical re-release. In the 1990s, MCA-Universal Home Video reissued it on VHS and LaserDisc.

The film was released on DVD in 2001. Many reviewers praised it for the quantity of special features, with DVD Authority asserting that it had "more than a lot of titles labeled as 'special edition' discs". It includes a 45-minute "Making of Jaws 2" documentary produced by Laurent Bouzereau, who is responsible for many of the documentaries about Universal's films. Other features include an 8-minute featurette in which actor Keith Gordon reminisces about his time making the film, a 7-minute featurette about composer John Williams, and a brief featurette in which Szwarc explains the phonetic problem with the film's original French title, Les Dents de la mer 2, as it sounded like it ended with the expletive merde (mer deux). This was combated by using the suffix Part 2. The disc also contains a gallery of storyboards, a gallery of almost 100 photos featuring cast, production, and promotional photos, four trailers (the original Jaws 2 trailer, the 1979 re-release trailer, and trailers for Jaws 3 and Jaws: The Revenge), and a selection of deleted scenes. These scenes show the animosity between Brody and Ellen's boss, Len Peterson (Joseph Mascolo), Brody explaining to Ellen that he is not about to take any chances letting Mike (Mark Gruner) go sailing, saying that the "smell of death" is the same in Amity as it is in New York, and the town's selectmen voting to fire Brody with Mayor Larry Vaughn (Murray Hamilton) being the only person to vote to save him. These scenes were cut because they were deemed to be slowing the film's pace. Also included is footage of the shark attacking the coast guard pilot underwater after his helicopter had capsized. This scene was cut because of the struggle with the ratings board to acquire a PG certificate.

The Region 1 DVD release also included several text-based features, such as Production Notes, Cast and Crew details, and an educational "Shark Facts" feature, but these were not included in all regions.

Although the audio was presented in Dolby Digital 2.0 mono, a reviewer for Film Freak Central comments that "Williams' score often sounds deceptively stereophonic". The BBC, though, suggest that the mix "really demands the added bass that a 5.1 effort could have lent it".

Universal Studios released Jaws 2 on Blu-ray in 2016 and on 4K Ultra HD Blu-ray in 2023. The Blu-ray contains most of the bonus materials from the 2001 DVD release, with the exception of the photo galleries, the text-based features, and the trailers for Jaws 3 and Jaws: The Revenge.

== Reception ==
=== Box office ===
Jaws 2 was the most expensive film that Universal had produced up until that point, costing the studio $30 million.

It opened to a gross of $9,866,023 in 640 theaters across the United States and Canada, ranking first and giving it the highest grossing opening weekend of all time up to that point as well as the single-day record of $3.5 million despite opening on the same day as Grease, which grossed $9 million the same weekend, which was greater than any film released prior to that weekend. It was the first time that there had been two day-and-date releases grossing such high amounts. The opening weekend led it to set a record weekly total of $16,654,000. It went on to earn $77,737,272 domestically during its initial release, making it the #6 highest-grossing film in 1978. It eventually surpassed $100 million with reissues, ultimately earning $102,922,376 domestically, and $208,900,376 worldwide.

=== Merchandising ===
A selection of merchandise from Jaws 2. Top: Movie Program; Soundtrack LP Album, Middle: The Jaws 2 Log by Ray Loynd; Jaws 2 novelization by Hank Searls, Bottom: A selection of trading cards

Jaws 2 inspired much more merchandising and sponsors than the first film. Products included sets of trading cards from Topps and Baker's bread, paper cups from Coca-Cola, beach towels, a souvenir program, shark tooth necklaces, coloring and activity books, and a model kit of Brody's truck. A novelization was written by Hank Searls based on an earlier draft of the screenplay by Sackler and Tristan; this, as Sight & Sound would say, bears "virtually no resemblance to the [screenplay] ultimately used." The first chapter of the novelization was printed in advance of the film's release in 15 U.S. newspapers, including the Los Angeles Times, the New York Post, Chicago Tribune and The Washington Post, and a condensed version of the novelization was published in Reader's Digest. Marvel Comics published a comic book adaptation of the film by writer Rick Marschall and artists Gene Colan and Tom Palmer in Marvel Super Special #6 (also based on the earlier script). Following the success of Carl Gottlieb's making-of book about the first film, Ray Loynd wrote The Jaws 2 Log, giving an account of the film's production.

=== Critical response ===
Throughout the years, the film has received mixed reviews, though it is widely regarded as the best of the three Jaws sequels. The review aggregator website Rotten Tomatoes reports an approval rating of 56% based on 43 reviews. The site's critics' consensus reads: "Jaws 2 never approaches the lingering thrills of its classic predecessor, but it's reasonably entertaining for a sequel that has no reason to exist." With a weighted average, Metacritic gave the film a score of 51 out of 100 based on 12 reviews, indicating "mixed or average" reviews. Critic John Kenneth Muir comments that opinions towards Jaws 2 depend upon which side of the series it is being compared. Against Spielberg's original, "it is an inferior sequel to a classic", but comparison with the subsequent films Jaws 3-D and Jaws: The Revenge shows Szwarc's film to be "a decent sequel, and one produced before the franchise hit troubled waters." Jaws 2, he says, is "at the deep end of the pool, better than its two shallow follow ups, and there is enough of Jaws' lingering greatness floating about to make it an entertaining and exciting two hours." Variety labelled it an "excellent sequel". DVD Authority says "After this one, the other Jaws movies seemed to just not be as good." One review says: "it's obviously not a patch on Spielberg's classic, but it's about as good as could be hoped for, with some excellent sequences, almost worthy of the original, several genuine shocks, a different enough story and some pretty decent characters." The performances of Scheider, Gary and Hamilton have been particularly praised.

Among contemporary reviews, Roger Ebert described the film as "pure trash". Gene Siskel gave it two-and-a-half stars out of four in his print review, writing that the film "is worth watching only when its leading player is on camera" and that when the teenage characters were not being attacked, Jaws 2 offers teenage action even less inspired than Beach Blanket Bingo". Vincent Canby of The New York Times wrote, "Some of the action sequences have been well staged, but they've been dropped into the film so indiscriminately that Jaws 2 never builds to a particular climax. It simply drones on and on, like a television movie. Someone also made a mistake in showing us so much of the mechanical shark so early in the film." Charles Champlin of the Los Angeles Times stated, "Maybe because familiarity breeds indifference the more you see of the shark this time the more it seems to have wandered away from the Universal Studios Tour, manmade and mechanical." Tom Pulleine of The Monthly Film Bulletin wrote, "Less a sequel than a remake, Jaws 2 is a tiresomely foregone conclusion to anyone who has seen Spielberg's film ... Even worse, since the events of the first film are acknowledged in this one, the refusal of the mayor and council to act on Brody's warning a second time round makes them appear idiotic to a degree that effectively sabotages any halfway serious dramatic interest."

George Morris for the Texas Monthly preferred Jaws 2 over the original because it is "less insidious in its methods of manipulation" and "because director Jeannot Szwarc streamlines the terror ... By crosscutting among the teenagers, Scheider, and the officials' efforts to rescue them, Szwarc works up enough suspense to keep the adrenaline going." However, Morris' review is not entirely complimentary. He would have preferred the shark to have been seen less, positing "producers and audiences alike seem to have forgotten that the greatest suspense derives from the unseen and the unknown, and that the imagination is capable of conceiving far worse than the materialization of a mere mechanical monster." Similarly, John Simon felt that the "shark's waning is caused by a decline in direction: Jeannot Szwarc has none of Steven Spielberg's manipulative cleverness. For one thing, he allows us close and disarming close-ups of the shark almost immediately ..." A reviewer for the BBC complained that the additional screen time awarded to the shark makes it "seems far less terrifying than its almost mystical contemporary". David Parkinson of Radio Times awarded it two stars out of five, calling it a "pale imitation of the classic original" and stating that "the suspense comes unglued because the film floats in all-too-familiar waters. You just know how everyone is going to react — from the stars to the director, and even the mechanical shark."

Although many critics identify some flaws, often comparing Szwarc negatively to Spielberg, DVD.net states that "this sequel does have some redeeming qualities going for it that make it a good movie in its own right". Richard Dreyfuss and Robert Shaw are missed, especially since the teenage characters are labeled "largely annoying 'Afterschool Special' archetypes" who are "irritating and incessantly screaming" and "don't make for very sympathetic victims". Because of its emphasis upon the teenage cast, some critics have compared the film to the popular slasher films that would soon follow. Also comparing the film's "interchangeable" teens to slasher films, particularly the Friday the 13th franchise, Muir says that "it feels wrong for a Jaws film to dwell in that shallow domain." However, the critic also commends the teen characters' comradeship and heroism, citing the character Marge (Martha Swatek), who is killed when saving Sean Brody (Marc Gilpin) from the shark.

The film's tagline, "Just when you thought it was safe to go back in the water ...", has become one of the most famous in film history. Andrew J. Kuehn, who developed the first film's trailer, is credited with coining the phrase. It has been parodied in numerous films, notably the tagline of the 1996 feature film adaptation of the television series, Flipper: "This summer, it's finally safe to go back in the water."

== See also ==
- List of killer shark films

== Bibliography ==
- Baxter, John (1997). Steven Spielberg: The Unauthorised Biography. London: Harper Collins. ISBN 0-00-638444-7.
- Ford, Luke (2004), The Producers: Profiles in Frustration, iUniverse, ISBN 0-595-32016-3
- Hall, Sheldon; Neale, Steve (2010). Epics, Spectacles and Blockbusters: A Hollywood History. Detroit, Michigan, USA: Wayne State University Press. ISBN 9780814330081.
- Kachmar, Diane C. (2002). Roy Scheider: a film biography. McFarland. ISBN 0-7864-1201-1.
- Gottlieb, Carl (2010), The Jaws Log: 30th Anniversary Edition, ReadHowYouWant.com, ISBN 978-1458720009
- Lintgen, Arthur (2016). "WILLIAMS: Jaws/WILLIAMS: Jaws 2". Fanfare. 39 (5). Tenafly: 461–462.
- Loock, Kathleen (2020). "'Just when you thought it was safe...' The Jaws sequels". In Hunter, I.Q.; Melia, Matthew (eds.). The Jaws Book. New York, NY: Bloomsbury Academic. ISBN 978-1-5013-7386-2.
- Loynd, Ray (1978). The Jaws 2 Log. London: W.H. Allen. ISBN 0-426-18868-3.
- Morris, George (August 1978), "With Its Teeth, Dear", Texas Monthly, 6 (8), Emmis Communications: 128
- Muir, John Kenneth (2007). Horror Films of the 1970s, Volume 2. Jefferson, North Carolina: McFarland. ISBN 978-0-7864-3104-5.
- Priggé, Steven (2004). Movie Moguls Speak: Interviews with Top Film Producers. McFarland. ISBN 0-7864-1929-6.
- Rosenfield, Paul (July 13, 1982), "Women in Hollywood", Los Angeles Times
- Smith, Michael A. (2018). Jaws 2: The Making of the Hollywood Sequel. with Louis R. Pisano (Updated and Expanded ed.). BearManor Media. ISBN 978-1629333281.
- Stevens, Brad (September 2021). "Coming soon to a bookstore near you: on novelisations". Sight & Sound. 31 (7). London: BFI: 103.
- Williams, Linda Ruth; Hammond, Michael (2006). American Contemporary Cinema. Berkshire, UK: Open University Press. ISBN 9780335218318.
