= Mick McGinty =

American artist (1952–2021)

- Born: December 7, 1952; Sioux City, Iowa, U.S.
- Died: September 18, 2021 (aged 68); Gilbert, Arizona, U.S.
- Education: Art Center College of Design
- Occupation: Artist

Mick McGinty (December 7, 1952 – September 18, 2021) was an American artist who specialized in airbrush, digital, and fine art oil painting.

He graduated from Art Center College of Design in Pasadena, California, in 1979, and went to work for the design studio, Willardson + White, which was headed by airbrush illustrators Charlie White III and Dave Willardson. After three years, he began a successful career as a freelance illustrator, working as an airbrush illustrator for the next 15 years before switching to digital media. Later in his career he entered into semi-retirement spending his time as a fine art painter and switching exclusively to oil painting, both in the studio as well as plein air painting.

== Early life, education, and career ==
McGinty was born on December 7, 1952, in Sioux City, Iowa, to Mike McGinty and Dorothy "Mudge" McGinty (née Love). His father was an over-the-road truck driver and his mother worked for the local beef packing plant, IBP. He was raised over the border in neighboring South Sioux City, Nebraska. He attended South Sioux City High School and graduated in 1971.

After high school, he enlisted in the Army where he served two years. He then moved to California and began working at Knott's Berry Farm as a pastel portrait artist while attending Fullerton College. He eventually attended the Art Center College of Design in Pasadena, California, where he excelled and graduated with Great Distinction with a Bachelor of Fine Arts degree in 1979. Upon graduating, he began to work at the design studio of Willardson + White in Hollywood, spending four years there, before branching out on his own as a freelance illustrator.

== Illustration work ==
McGinty quickly became a sought after illustrator and landed many high profile jobs early in his career. Some of the movies he worked on include Field of Dreams, Rambo: First Blood Part II, The Addams Family, Almost an Angel, Batman (1989), Dragnet, Flubber, The Fly, Ghostbusters II, Harry and the Hendersons, Hook, Jaws: The Revenge, Labyrinth, Little Shop of Horrors, Moving, Peggy Sue Got Married, Robin Hood: Prince of Thieves, RoboCop 2, Shock Treatment, Spaceballs, Spaced Invaders, Tales from the Darkside, and Who Framed Roger Rabbit.

He painted prolifically for the Universal Studios theme parks, creating billboards and ads for their attractions, including backlot attractions King Kong, Earthquake, Jaws, and Jurassic Park: The Ride.

He is most known as the illustrator for many iconic video games from the 1990s, including Street Fighter II, Kid Chameleon, and Streets of Rage II, among many other video games.

McGinty painted a number of album covers for various artists, doing work for such names as Megadeth, The Police, Earth, Wind & Fire, Whitesnake, and .38 Special.

He also painted covers for magazines such as Time and MAD Magazine, as well as many advertisements for other high profile companies such as Reebok, MTV, Levi's Jeans, California Raisins, C&H Sugar, Warner Brothers, and others.

== Fine art work ==
In 2007, McGinty relocated to Arizona. He continued to work on commercial illustrations, however his move to the southwest opened up both opportunity and passion for a transition into fine art. He had begun oil painting while still living in the Sioux City area, however the landscapes of the southwest gave him greater ability to spend time outdoors plein air painting landscapes that intrigued him. He painted prolifically in Monument Valley and Sedona, and also painted on trips to Yosemite, the Pacific Northwest, San Diego beaches, and scenes from trips to New York City. Above all of those, however, his greatest passion was painting the Grand Canyon, and he regularly participated in the Grand Canyon Celebration of Art.

== Personal life ==
McGinty married his wife, Kerry, in 1976. He was Kerry's first date when she was in her sophomore year of high school. After graduating high school, McGinty joined the Army and served two years. He later relocated to the Los Angeles area, where eventually he and Kerry would get married. They continued to live there for the next 17 years until moving to Dakota Dunes, South Dakota, a community just outside of their hometown near Sioux City, Iowa. Fourteen years later, in 2007, they would move to Gilbert, Arizona, to be closer to their children as well as other extended family.

Aside from painting, McGinty loved to golf, was a fan of his home state Nebraska Cornhuskers football team, and was a fan of the Los Angeles Dodgers.

Mick and Kerry were married for almost 45 years when he was diagnosed with Stage IV lung cancer in August 2021. Mick died six weeks later on 18 September 2021. His last six weeks have been chronicled in detail on his website.
