= The Silence (1975 film) =

1975 movie about a West Point cadet charged with cheating on an exam

- Genre: Drama
- Written by: Stanley R. Greenberg
- Directed by: Joseph Hardy
- Starring: Richard Thomas; Cliff Gorman; George Hearn
- Music by: Maurice Jarre
- Country of origin: United States
- Original language: English

Production
- Executive producer: Edgar J. Scherick
- Producer: Bridget Potter
- Cinematography: Jack Priestley
- Editor: Alan Heim
- Running time: 74 min.
- Production company: Palomar Pictures

Original release
- Network: NBC
- Release: November 6, 1975

The Silence is a 1975 made-for-TV movie about James Pelosi, a West Point cadet who was charged in 1971 with cheating on an exam. He remained at West Point but was subjected to "The Silence", a policy that ostracized cadets who broke the Cadet Honor Code.

== Alleged cheating incident ==
During his junior year at the United States Military Academy at West Point, Cadet Pelosi was accused of cheating on an exam. He was found guilty by the cadet honor committee. Although the officers’ review board's committee exonerated him, his fellow cadets imposed "The Silence" anyway. At the time, West Point's "Honor Instruction" stated that a cadet who broke the Honor Code and did not leave the academy "will not be allowed to have roommates. He will eat at a separate table. He will be addressed only on official business and then as Mister." Pelosi endured "The Silence" for 19 months until he graduated from West Point in 1973.

== Television dramatization ==
A television dramatization was first shown on NBC on November 6, 1975. The dramatization does not judge Pelosi's guilt or innocence. Rather, it depicts his version of the incident and the systematic ostracism that followed his decision not to resign from the academy. Scriptwriter Stanley R. Greenberg based the drama on interviews he had with Pelosi.

== Aftermath ==
"The Silence" was abolished by the Corps of Cadets in 1973. Many attribute that decision to Pelosi's experience. Pelosi went on to serve in the U.S. Army as a first lieutenant in Army's Berlin Brigade's Special Troops Unit, he received a medal for a May 17, 1975, incident for heroism in rescuing wounded civilians in a nonmilitary traffic accident.

General Benjamin O. Davis Jr., a 1936 West Point graduate, also endured "The Silence" from his arrival to the academy to his graduation because he was one of the first African-American cadets.

== Cast ==
- Richard Thomas as Cadet James Pelosi
- George Hearn as Captain Nichols
- Percy Granger as Captain Harris
- John Kellogg as Court President
- Cliff Gorman as Stanley R. Greenberg
- James Mitchell as Colonel Mack
- Charles Frank as Cadet Captain
- Andrew Duncan as Mr. Pelosi
- Malcolm Groome as Andy
- Peter Weller as "Red Sash"
- Michael Cooke as Tom Thorne
- John Carpenter as Mr. Keene
- Cynthia Grover as Elaine
- Polly Holliday as Mrs. Watson
- Elaine Hyman as Mrs. Pelasi
- Lionel Pina as Pete
- Richard Shoberg as Chuck
- Craig Wasson as Hal
