= Jaws.io =

2019 video game

- Developer: SRG Studios
- Publisher: Universal Studios Interactive Entertainment LLC
- Series: Jaws
- Platforms: iOS, Android
- Release: February 14, 2019
- Genre: Action

Jaws.io was an action video game based on the 1975 American horror film Jaws. It was developed by Puerto Rican company SRG Studios and published by Universal Studios Interactive Entertainment LLC for iOS and Android devices, and was released on February 14, 2019. The game's servers were shut down on October 31 the same year and is no longer available for download.

== Gameplay ==
Inspired by Agar.io, Jaws.io is a multiplayer game where the goal is pick up or eat (depending on whether the player is controlling a ship or a shark) as much as possible, in order to obtain the highest score in time-limited matches. Players would take on the role as the captain of a boat rescuing civilians of Amity Island stranded out at sea. As players sailed around picking up civilians, they were to use power-ups to combat against other boats as well as the titular Jaws. Players would also be given the opportunity to transform into Jaws for a short period in the match to wreak havoc against other opponents. The gameplay used touch controls to maneuver around in a manner similar to that of games found in the .io game genre with comparisons drawn towards Slither.io and Agar.io.

The players were able to receive rewards for logging in each day, and coins collected in each play could have been used for certain shark upgrades.
