= Marc Gilpin =

American actor (1966–2023)

- Born: September 26, 1966; Austin, Texas, U.S.
- Died: July 29, 2023 (aged 56); Dallas, Texas, U.S.
- Occupation: Actor
- Years active: 1977–1989
- Spouse: Kaki
- Children: 2
- Relatives: Peri Gilpin (sister)

Marc Gilpin (September 26, 1966 – July 29, 2023) was an American actor.

== Early life ==
Gilpin was born on September 26, 1966, to Wes Gilpin and Barbara Bushway. After his parents' divorce, his father married an old childhood friend, Sandra Jo Hauck, herself a divorcee with two daughters, one being Peri Gilpin, who later became famous for playing Roz Doyle on Frasier.

== Career ==
Gilpin played Sean Brody along with Roy Scheider, Lorraine Gary, and his sister, April, in Jaws 2 (1978), by Jeannot Szwarc; Willie along with Henry Darrow and Kate Woodville in Where's Willie? (1978); and Dalem along with Christopher Connelly, Meredith MacRae, Elissa Leeds and Joseph Campanella in Earthbound (1981), by James L. Conway. He also appeared in The Legend of the Lone Ranger (1981).

== Personal life ==
Gilpin quit acting in 1989 and became a self-taught software engineer, earning several software patents. He married Kaki in 1999 and they had two sons, Spencer and Presley.

== Death ==
Gilpin died in Dallas of glioblastoma on July 29, 2023, at the age of 56.

== Filmography ==
- Thunder (1977)
- Where's Willie? (1978) as Willie Wade
- Jaws 2 (1978) as Sean Brody
- CHiPs (1979) as Timmy Getraer
- Fantasy Island (1979) as Bobby
- Flying High (1979) as Bobby Stacy
- Earthbound (1981) as Dalem
- The Legend of the Lone Ranger (1981) as Young John Reid
- CBS Afternoon Playhouse (1982) as Rick
- License to Kill (1984) as Larry Chernoff
- Surviving (1985) as Bobby
- Right to Kill? (1985) as Billy
- Silver Spoons (1985) as William Dasher
- China Beach (1988) as Sammy Coy
- She's Out of Control (1989) as Parking Attendant
