= Mark Gruner =

American actor (born 1958)

- Born: December 29, 1958 (age 67); Fort Leonard Wood, Missouri
- Occupation: Actor
- Years active: 1970–1978
- Relatives: David Gruner (brother)

Mark Gruner (born December 29, 1958) is an American former actor.

He played Robert Mueller in A Little Game (1971), by Paul Wendkos, and Perron in The Tribe (1974), by Richard A. Colla. His final and most notable role was Mike Brody in Jaws 2 (1978). His late brother, David Gruner (1957–2009), was also an actor.

== Filmography ==
- The Brady Bunch (1970) as Clark Tyson
- Dan August (1970) as Jimmy Eberson
- A Little Game (1971) as Robert Mueller
- Fantastic Planet (1973) as Terr
- The Tribe (1974) as Perron
- Jaws 2 (1978) as Mike Brody
