= Cindy Grover =

American actress (born 1958)

- Born: October 15, 1958 (age 67); United States
- Other name: Cynthia Grover
- Occupation: Actress
- Known for: Jaws 2; The Silence; Network; Love of Life

Cynthia Grover (born October 15, 1958) is an American actress.

She played Lucy in Jaws 2 (1978), and Elaine in The Silence (1975). She played Eve in the TV episode 'A Puzzle for Prophets', from Mrs. Columbo (1979) along Francine Tacker, Joe Ruskin, and Richard Altman; and Linda in Family alongside Cliff De Young and Louise Foley.

== Filmography ==
- The Choice (1981) as Joan
- Family (1980) as Linda Robertson
- Hart to Hart (1980) as Ella Greber
- Mrs. Columbo (1979) as Eve
- Married: The First Year (1979) as Joanna Huffman Baker
- Jaws 2 (1978) as Lucy
- Network (1976) as Caroline Schumacher
- The Silence (1975) as Elaine
- Love of Life (1971–72) as Stacy Corby
- Andy (1965)
