= A Little Game (1971 film) =

- Print ad
- Written by: Carol Sobieski
- Story by: Fielden Farrington
- Directed by: Paul Wendkos
- Starring: Diane Baker; Ed Nelson; Howard Duff; Katy Jurado
- Music by: Robert Prince
- Country of origin: United States
- Original language: English

Production
- Producers: George Eckstein; Richard Irving
- Cinematography: Harry L. Wolf
- Editor: Michael Economou
- Running time: 73 minutes

Original release
- Network: ABC
- Release: October 30, 1971

A Little Game is a 1971 ABC Movie of the Week that was first broadcast on October 30, 1971, starring Mark Gruner as a young boy who will do anything to get what he wants. In the movie, the plot suggests that he might be responsible for the death of a fellow student at the military academy he attends, yet his mother (Diane Baker) refuses to believe that he could be guilty of anything. His stepfather (Ed Nelson) begins to wonder if the boy wants to get rid of him. It was based on the 1968 novel of the same name by Fielden Farrington, who also wrote the screenplay. The film was directed by Paul Wendkos, who would film another of Farrington's novels for television the following year (The Strangers in 7A).

== Cast ==
- Diane Baker as Elaine Hamilton
- Ed Nelson as Paul Hamilton
- Howard Duff as Dunlap
- Katy Jurado as Laura
- Mark Gruner as Robert Mueller
- Christopher Shea as Stu Parker
- Helen Kleeb as Secretary
- Jason Fithian as Clubber

== See also ==
- List of American films of 1971
