= Lorraine Gary =

American actress (born 1937)

- Born: Lorraine Gottfried; August 16, 1937 (age 89); Forest Hills, New York, U.S.
- Other name: Lorraine Sheinberg
- Education: Columbia University
- Occupation: Actress
- Years active: 1967–1979, 1987
- Known for: Jaws; Jaws 2; 1941
- Spouse: Sidney Sheinberg (m. 1956; died 2019)
- Children: 2

Lorraine Gottfried (born August 16, 1937), better known by her stage name Lorraine Gary, is a retired American actress, best known for her role as Ellen Brody in the Jaws film series. She also appeared in 1941 and Car Wash.

== Early life ==
Gary was born as Lorraine Gottfried in Forest Hills, Queens, to Belle and George Gottfried, an entertainment business manager.

At an early age, she moved with her family to Los Angeles, California, where she was raised. At age 16, she won a best actress award in a competition at the prestigious Pasadena Playhouse. She was offered a scholarship to enroll at the Pasadena Playhouse, but declined and attended Columbia University as a political science major instead.

== Career ==
A life member of the Actors Studio, Gary began her acting career in the late 1960s doing guest appearances on several popular TV shows. These include Night Gallery, Dragnet 1968, in an episode entitled "The Big Shipment", McCloud, The Marcus-Nelson Murders (the pilot for Kojak), and The F.B.I.. She began her first major acting role when she was a guest star on seven episodes of the TV series Ironside, among them "Tom Dayton Is Loose Among Us", in which she played the substitute librarian Miss Kirk, who pushes the unstable Tom Dayton too hard, and "In Search of an Artist", as a woman with a drinking problem who may have been involved in a murder.

She portrayed matriarch Ellen Brody in Jaws, Jaws 2, and Jaws: The Revenge. Her performance in Jaws: The Revenge garnered Gary a Saturn Award nomination for Best Actress, and made her the actor with the most appearances in the film series.

Her film roles outside the Jaws franchise include I Never Promised You a Rose Garden, Just You and Me, Kid, and Zero to Sixty.

In addition to her work as an actress, Gary owned New Hope Productions, a company that produced television programs.

In 2026 she agreed to participate in the documentary The Shark that Roared, a retrospective film regarding the making and pop cultural impact of Jaws: The Revenge.

== Civic activities ==
Gary is a member of the Human Rights Watch Women's Rights Advisory Committee, for whom she produced and directed a series of fourteen educational videotapes, and an Advisory Board Member of Ms. Magazine and Girls Learn International.

In 1995, together with her husband, Gary received the Simon Wiesenthal Center's Humanitarian Award.

== Personal life ==
Gary married entertainment industry executive Sidney Sheinberg on August 19, 1956, at the age of 19, with whom she has two sons.

Gary retired from acting after her appearance in the film 1941 (1979), only briefly returning to reprise the role of Ellen Brody in Jaws: The Revenge (1987). Her sons, Bill Sheinberg and Jonathan Sheinberg, are both film producers.

== Filmography ==
=== Film ===
Year	Title	Role	Notes
1975	Jaws	Ellen Brody	
1976	Car Wash	Hysterical Lady	
1977	I Never Promised You a Rose Garden	Esther Blake	
1978	Zero to Sixty	Billy-Jon	
1978	Jaws 2	Ellen Brody	
1979	Just You and Me, Kid	Shirley	
1979	1941	Joan Douglas	
1987	Jaws: The Revenge	Ellen Brody	Final film role

=== Television ===
Year	Title	Role	Notes
1967	Dragnet	Mrs. Frank	"The Big Shipment"
1967	The Virginian	Martha Young	"Without Mercy"
1968	Ironside	Nancy Lewin / Nurse Green	"All in a Day's Work", "Split Second to an Epitaph: Parts 1 & 2"
1969	Ironside	Leona Stuart	"In Search of an Artist"
1969	The Virginian	Laura	"The Stranger"
1969	The Name of the Game	Carla Frazier	"Breakout to a Fast Buck"
1969	The Bold Ones: The Protectors	Margaret Sheehan	"A Case of Good Whiskey at Christmas Time"
1970	The Bold Ones: The New Doctors	Dr. Marion Lester	"If I Can't Sing, I'll Listen"
1970	McCloud	Joan Stanford	"Horse Stealing on Fifth Avenue"
1970	San Francisco International Airport	Janie	"The High Cost of Nightmares"
1970	The Men from Shiloh	Mrs. Nelson	"Hannah"
1970	Ironside	Patricia Kirk / Elaine Potter	"Tom Dayton Is Loose Among Us", "Noel's Gonna Fly"
1971	The City	Victoria Ulysses	TV film
1971	O'Hara, U.S. Treasury	Mrs. Madrid	"Operation: Crystal Springs"
1971	Owen Marshall, Counselor at Law	Norma Pruitt	"A Lonely Stretch of Beach"
1971	McMillan & Wife	Connie	"Husbands, Wives, and Killers"
1972	McMillan & Wife	Monica Fontaine	"Cop of the Year"
1972	Hec Ramsey	Bella Grant	"Mystery of the Green Feather"
1972	Night Gallery	Barbara Morgan	"She'll be Company for You"
1973	Owen Marshall, Counselor at Law	Annie Harker	"They've Got to Blame Somebody"
1973	Partners in Crime	Margery Jordan	TV film
1973	ABC's Wide World of Entertainment	Liz Elliott	"A Prowler in the Heart"
1973	Ironside	Ellen Wills	"Fragile Is the House of Cards"
1973	The F.B.I.	Angela Norton	"The Confession"
1973-74	Kojak	Ruth Gardner	"The Marcus-Nelson Murders", "Marker to a Dead Bookie"
1974	Pray for the Wildcats	Lila Summerfield	TV film
1974	Marcus Welby, M.D.	Jean Wainwright	"The Mugging"
1974	The Rookies	Lynn Corey	"Rolling Thunder"
1975	Man on the Outside		TV film
1976	Lanigan's Rabbi	Myra Galen	"Friday the Rabbi Slept Late"
1978	Crash	Emily Mulwray	TV film
