= Judith Barsi =

American child actress (1978–1988)

- Barsi on an episode of Punky Brewster in 1986
- Born: Judith Eva Barsi; June 6, 1978; Los Angeles, California, U.S.
- Died: July 25, 1988 (aged 10); Los Angeles, California, U.S.
- Cause of death: Homicide by gunshot
- Resting place: Forest Lawn Memorial Park, Hollywood Hills, California, U.S.
- Occupation: Actor
- Years active: 1984–1988

Judith Eva Barsi (June 6, 1978 – July 25, 1988) was an American child actress. She began her career in television, making appearances in commercials and television series, as well as the 1987 film Jaws: The Revenge. She also provided the voices of Ducky in The Land Before Time and Anne-Marie in All Dogs Go to Heaven, both released after her death. She and her mother, Maria, were killed in July 1988 in a double murder–suicide committed in their home by her father, József Barsi.

== Early life ==
Judith Eva Barsi was born in Los Angeles County, California, on June 6, 1978, the daughter of József Istvan and Maria Barsi.

== Career ==
Maria Barsi began preparing her daughter to become an actress when Judith was five. Barsi's first role was in Fatal Vision (1984), playing Kimberley MacDonald. She went on to appear in more than seventy commercials and guest roles on television. As well as her career in television, she appeared in the film Jaws: The Revenge (1987). She provided the voices of Ducky in The Land Before Time (1988), and Anne-Marie in All Dogs Go to Heaven (1989).

By the time she began fourth grade, Barsi was earning an estimated $100,000 per year (equivalent to $272,000 in 2025) allowing her family to buy a three-bedroom house in West Hills, Los Angeles. As she was short for her age—3 ft 8 in (112 cm) at age 10—she began receiving hormone injections at UCLA to encourage her growth. Her petiteness led casting directors to cast her in roles as children who were younger than her actual age. Her agent Ruth Hansen was quoted in the Los Angeles Times as saying that when she was ten, "she was still playing 7, 8 (years of age)."

== Abuse and death ==
As Barsi's career success increased, her father József, an alcoholic, became increasingly angry, and repeatedly threatened to kill himself, his wife, and his daughter. He was arrested three times for drunk driving. Before Judith left to film Jaws: The Revenge, József reportedly held a knife to her throat and threatened to kill her if she did not return. In December 1986, Maria reported his threats and physical violence against her to the police. After the police found no physical signs of abuse, she decided not to press charges against him.

After the incident with the police, József reportedly stopped drinking, but continued to threaten Maria and Judith with violence, including threats to burn down the house. He also reportedly hid a telegram informing Maria that a relative in Hungary had died, hoping to prevent her from leaving the United States with Judith. The physical violence continued, with Barsi telling a friend that her father threw pots and pans at her, resulting in a nosebleed. As a result of being abused, Judith began gaining weight and developed compulsive behaviors, such as plucking out her eyelashes and pulling out her cat's whiskers. In May 1988, after breaking down in front of her agent, Ruth Hansen, Judith was taken by Maria to a child psychologist, who identified severe physical and emotional abuse and reported her findings to child protective services.

The investigation was dropped after Maria assured the case worker that she intended to begin divorce proceedings against József and that she and Judith were going to move into a Panorama City apartment she had recently rented as a daytime haven from him. Maria's friends urged her to follow through on the plan, but she hesitated for fear of losing the family home and belongings.

Months before her murder, Barsi had reportedly told friends, "I'm afraid to go home ... My daddy is miserable. My daddy is drunk every day and I know he wants to kill my mother."

On July 28, 1988, the Los Angeles Times reported that three people had been found dead in an apparent murder–suicide and that the bodies were believed to be those of Barsi, her mother Maria, and her father József. József shot Maria in the hallway of their home and Judith in her bed. The article quoted Police Lt. Warren Knowles as saying that a flammable liquid, presumably gasoline, had been poured on the bodies of Maria and Judith by József. József's body was found in the garage; he had died from what was determined to be a self-inflicted gunshot wound. Neighbor Eunice Daly said that she had heard a gunshot around 8:30 a.m. on July 27, prompting her to call the police. Barsi and her mother were buried in Forest Lawn Memorial Park in adjoining plots.

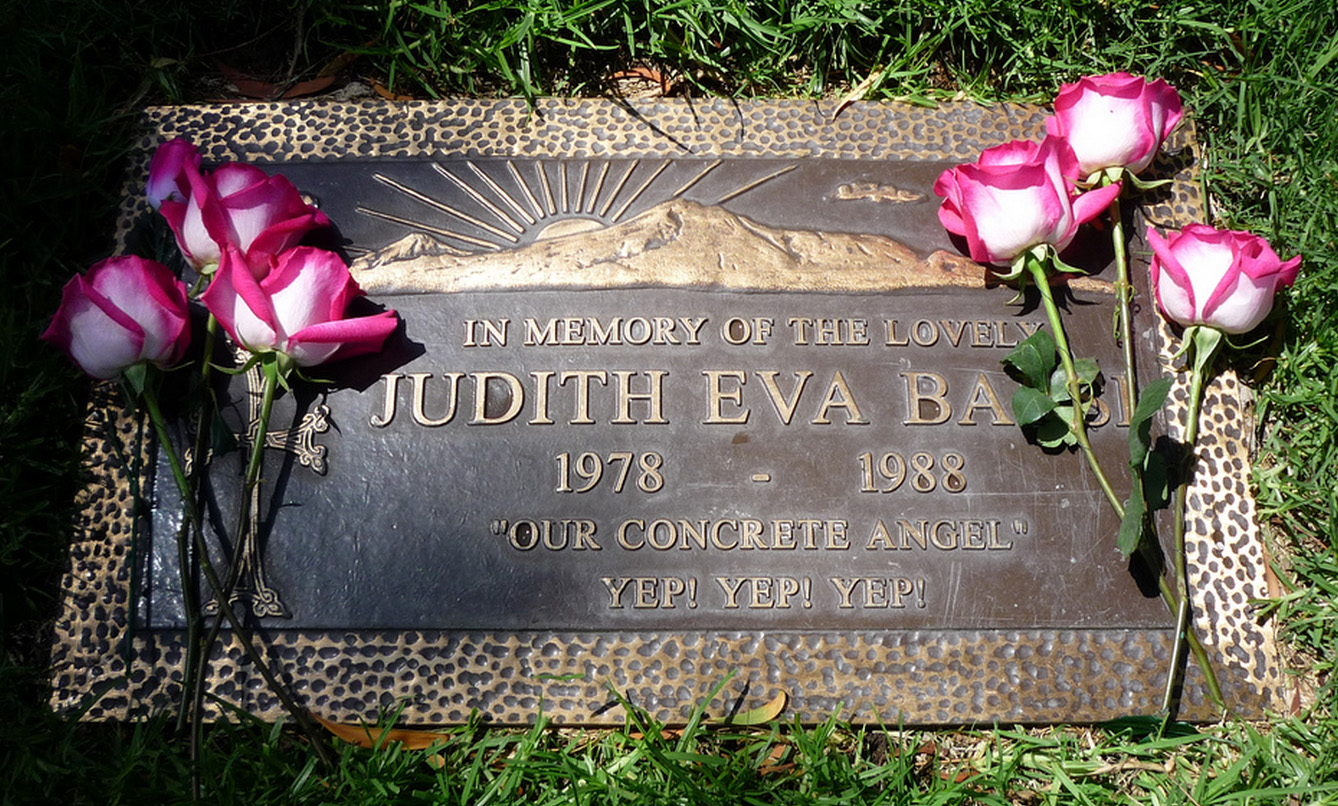
Barsi's gravestone, paid for by fan subscription in 2004; It contains her Land Before Time catchphrase ("Yep! Yep! Yep!") and an allusion to the Martina McBride song "Concrete Angel".

== Final films ==
Barsi was featured as a voice actress in two films following her death: The Land Before Time (1988) and All Dogs Go to Heaven (1989). Don Bluth, the director of both films, praised her as being "absolutely astonishing" and said that he and his crew had been "nearly paralyzed" by the news of her death. Bluth had intended to continue to feature her extensively in his future productions and dedicated the song "Love Survives" from the end credits of All Dogs Go To Heaven to her memory.

== Filmography ==
Film and television work by Judith Barsi
Year	Title	Role	Notes
1984	Fatal Vision	Kimberly MacDonald (age three)	Miniseries
1984	Jessie	Katie	Episode: "Valerie's Turn"
1985	Kids Don't Tell	Jennifer Ryan	TV movie
1985	Do You Remember Love	Kathleen	TV movie
1985	Knots Landing	Bratty Girl	Episode: "#14 with a Bullet"
1985	The Twilight Zone	Bertie	Segment: "A Little Peace and Quiet"
1985	There Were Times, Dear	Molly Reed	TV movie
1985	The Fall Guy	Little Girl	Episode: "Escape Claus"
1986	Remington Steele	Laurie Beth Piper	Episode: "Suburban Steele"
1986	Punky Brewster	Anna	2 episodes
1986	Trapper John, M.D.	Lindsay Christmas	Episode: "Life, Death and Dr. Christmas"
1986	Cheers	Child #1	Episode: "Relief Bartender"
1986	Cagney & Lacey	Shauna Bard	Episode: "Disenfranchised"
1986	The New Gidget	Little Girl	Episode: "It's Only Rock & Roll"
1986	Eye of the Tiger	Jennifer Matthews	
1986	The Love Boat	Christmas Angel	Episode: "The Christmas Cruise: Part 2"
1987	Destination America	Amy	TV movie
1987	Slam Dance	Bean	
1987	Jaws: The Revenge	Thea Brody	
1987–1988	The Tracey Ullman Show	Little Girl / Karen	2 episodes
1988	St. Elsewhere	Debbie Oppenheimer	Episode: "The Abby Singer Show"
1988	Growing Pains	Young Carol	Episodes: "Graduation Day" "The Last Picture Show: Part 2" (archive footage from "Graduation Day")
1988	ABC Afterschool Special	Billie Foster	Episode: "A Family Again"; released posthumously
1988	The Land Before Time	Ducky (voice)	Released posthumously
1989	All Dogs Go to Heaven	Anne-Marie (voice)	Released posthumously
