= Jaws: The Revenge =

1987 film by Joseph Sargent

- Theatrical release poster by Mick McGinty
- Directed by: Joseph Sargent
- Written by: Michael de Guzman
- Based on: Characters by Peter Benchley
- Produced by: Joseph Sargent
- Starring: Lorraine Gary; Lance Guest; Mario Van Peebles; Karen Young; Michael Caine
- Cinematography: John McPherson
- Edited by: Michael Brown
- Music by: Michael Small
- Production company: Universal Pictures
- Distributed by: Universal Pictures
- Release date: July 17, 1987
- Running time: 90 minutes
- Country: United States
- Language: English
- Budget: $23 million
- Box office: $51.9 million

Jaws: The Revenge is a 1987 American thriller film produced and directed by Joseph Sargent. The fourth and final film in the Jaws franchise, it stars Lorraine Gary, who came out of retirement to reprise her role from the first two films, along with new cast members Lance Guest, Mario Van Peebles, Karen Young and Michael Caine. Acting as a direct sequel to Jaws 2 (retroactively ignoring the events of Jaws 3-D), the film focuses on a now-widowed Ellen Brody (Gary) and her conviction that a great white shark is seeking revenge on her family, particularly when it kills her younger son Sean, and follows her to the Bahamas.

The film was made in less than nine months, with production commencing in September 1986 so that the film could be released the following summer. The film was shot on location in New England and in the Bahamas and completed on the Universal lot. As with the first two films, Martha's Vineyard was the location of the fictional Amity Island for the opening scenes. Delays caused by the mechanical sharks and the weather led to concerns about whether the release date would be met. Many critics suggested that the rushed production compromised the quality of the film. The film was marketed with the now infamous tagline "This time, it's personal."

Jaws: The Revenge was the lowest-grossing film of the franchise, with $51.9 million total gross on a $23 million budget, barely breaking even. It received largely negative reviews from critics and audiences alike, who felt that the franchise had run its course, and some called it one of the worst films of all time.

== Plot ==
On Amity Island, Martin Brody, famous for his deeds as the police chief, has died from a heart attack. Martin's widow, Ellen, still lives in Amity, close to her younger son, Sean, and his fiancée, Tiffany. Sean works as a police deputy, and when he is dispatched to clear a log from a buoy a few days before Christmas, a great white shark appears and kills him.

Martin's older son, Michael, his wife, Carla, and their five-year-old daughter, Thea, come to Amity for the funeral. Michael works in the Bahamas as a marine biologist, and on his arrival, Ellen demands he stop his work. Having just received his first grant, Michael refuses. Thea convinces Ellen to return to the Bahamas with them.

The pilot of their small plane, Hoagie Newcombe, takes an interest in Ellen. Ellen begins spending time with him. Michael introduces his mother to his colleague Jake McCay and his wife Louisa, and they spend Christmas and New Year's together.

A few days later, Michael, Jake and their crew encounter the shark, which followed the family from Amity. Jake is eager to research it because great white sharks have never been seen in the Bahamas due to the warm water. Michael asks him not to mention the shark to his family. Ellen has nightmares of being attacked by the shark. She is able to sense when the shark is about to attack.

Jake decides to attach a device to the shark that can track it through its heartbeat. Using chum to attract it, Jake stabs the device's tracking pole into the shark's side. The next day, the shark ambushes and chases Michael through a sunken ship, and he narrowly escapes.

Thea goes on an inflatable banana boat, and the shark attacks the back of the boat killing another passenger. Witnessing this attack, Ellen boards Jake's boat to track down the shark, intending to kill it. After hearing about what happened, Michael confesses he knew about the shark, infuriating Carla.

Michael and Jake are flown by Hoagie to search for Ellen and find the shark in pursuit of their boat. During the search, Hoagie explains to Michael about Ellen's belief that the shark that killed Sean is hunting her family. When they find her, Hoagie lands the plane on the water, ordering Michael and Jake to swim to the boat as the shark drags the plane and Hoagie underwater. Hoagie escapes from the shark, and Jake and Michael hastily put together a device that emits electrical impulses. Jake is then mauled by the shark, but manages to get the device into the shark's mouth before being dragged underwater. Michael begins blasting the shark with the impulses. It repeatedly jumps out of the water, roaring in pain.

Ellen steers the sailboat towards the shark, while thinking back to the shark's attack on Thea and also imagining Sean's death, and Martin defeating the first shark. As the shark is rearing up, she rams the broken bowsprit of the boat into it.

In the original version of the film that was screened in the U.S., the shark bleeds out and dies after being impaled. In the revised ending (for international theaters and DVD release), the impaling causes the shark to immediately explode, and its corpse sinks to the bottom of the ocean (footage from the ending of the first film is used to show this). Jake dies in the original cut, but in the revised ending, Michael hears Jake calling for help, seriously injured but still alive. A short time later, Hoagie flies Ellen back to Amity Island.

== Cast ==
- Lorraine Gary as Ellen Brody
- Lance Guest as Michael "Mike" Brody
- Mario Van Peebles as Jake
- Michael Caine as Hoagie
- Karen Young as Carla Brody
- Judith Barsi as Thea Brody
- Lynn Whitfield as Louisa McCay
- Cedric Scott as Clarence
- Charles Bowleg as William
- Melvin Van Peebles as Mr. Witherspoon
- Mary Smith as Tiffany
- Edna Billotto as Polly
- Fritzi Jane Courtney as Mrs. Taft
- Cyprian R. Dube as Mayor Jim
- Lee Fierro as Mrs. Kintner
- William E. Marks as Deputy Lenny
- Diane Hetfield as Mrs. Ferguson
- Mitchell Anderson as Sean Brody
- Roy Scheider as Police Chief Martin Brody (via archive footage from the original 1975 film, uncredited)

== Production ==
=== Development ===
As MCA Universal was going through a difficult period, its CEO Sidney Sheinberg saw that a third sequel to Jaws was likely to make a good profit, following the commercial success of Jaws 3-D, despite generally attracting negative reviews. Sheinberg also saw an opportunity to promote the Jaws ride at Universal Studios.

The studio fast-tracked Jaws: The Revenge into production in September 1986 so that it could be released the following summer. Steve De Jarnatt had been approached by Universal's Head of Production Frank Price about writing the script for Jaws IV, as it was then known. De Jarnatt's script, however, was shelved when Price resigned in September 1986 following the disappointing performance of Howard the Duck. Around this time, Sheinberg approached Joseph Sargent about directing the film. Sargent had worked with Lorraine Gary in 1973's The Marcus-Nelson Murders, for which he won a Directors Guild of America Award for Outstanding Directorial Achievement in Miniseries or Movies for Television, his first. Steven Spielberg cites this television film, which later spawned Kojak, as motivation for casting Gary as Ellen Brody in the original Jaws film, in addition to the fact she was the wife of the studio's chief executive Sheinberg at that time. Regarding Revenge, Gary remarked in an interview: "I made a good deal on this film, but I didn't make as good a deal as I would have if I weren't married to Sid."

In an interview with the Boston Herald, Sargent called Revenge "a ticking bomb waiting to go off", saying that MCA Inc. president Sheinberg "expects a miracle." Sheinberg asked Sargent to direct the film in late September 1986. According to Sargent, Sheinberg "cut through all the slow lanes and got Jaws: The Revenge off and running." In a 2006 interview, Sargent stated that the premise was born "out of a little bit of desperation to find something fresh to do with the shark. We thought that maybe if we take a mystical point of view, and go for a little bit of ... magic, we might be able to find something interesting enough to sit through."

Sargent hired Michael de Guzman to write a script, within five weeks, with the shooting script being completed during production. According to the writer, they had the "bare bones of a story" by October 1986, and by November 2, 1986 they had a workable outline for the production team. The first draft was completed in mid-December, and the final draft of the screenplay was dated January 23, 1987, just nine days before filming began in Edgartown.

The film was developed under the working title Jaws '87, but by February 1987, the title Jaws: The Revenge was being used. The colon within the title is used by some sources although the colon is not included in the film's opening credits, or on the poster.

The film has no continuity with Jaws 3-D. In its predecessor, Mike Brody (played by Dennis Quaid) is an engineer for SeaWorld, whereas in Jaws: The Revenge, he is a marine research scientist. One of the Universal press releases for Jaws: The Revenge refers to this fourth film in the series as the "third film of the remarkable Jaws trilogy." de Guzman's script featured an appearance by Matt Hooper, while the producers still hoped to recruit Richard Dreyfuss to reprise his role as Hooper for the project.

It was proposed that Martin Brody was to be the shark's first victim. When Roy Scheider declined to appear, Sargent reports that the character of Brody had been dead for 18 months "when we enter the story... and deal with Ellen Brody's emotional problem--her obsession with the death of another member of her family." For de Guzman, it "is a story of obsession and fear. Whether what Ellen Brody has in her mind is true or not will be left up to the audience to decide. No statement is being made in that regard... but it's about any kind of fear so great and so strong that it begins to take control of a human being's life."

de Guzman and Sargent were inspired by the first film's "less is more" approach. Replicating the idea of the yellow barrels in the original, they believed that having the shark swallow meat attached to a sonar device, emitting the sound of the shark's heartbeat, would create tension and be more effective than constantly seeing the shark or people being eaten. de Guzman asserts that the strongest characters in drama are often those off-screen, another justification for not showing the shark too often. Sargent expected the audience to appreciate what they tried to do, and had ambitions that it would not be seen as "a tired version of the first one."

=== Casting ===
Lorraine Gary portrayed Ellen Brody in the first two films. In a press release, Gary says Jaws: The Revenge is "also about relationships which ... makes it much more like the first Jaws." This was Gary's first film role since she had appeared in Spielberg's 1941 eight years earlier, as well as being her final film role. The press release proposes that the character "had much more depth and texture than either of the other films was able to explore. The promise of further developing this multi-dimensional woman under the extraordinary circumstances ... intrigued Gary enough to lure her back to the screen after a lengthy hiatus."

Gary is the only principal cast member from the original film who returned. Roy Scheider and Richard Dreyfuss refused to participate. Scheider had other commitments, and also had clearly expressed a desire not to play the character again. Lee Fierro made a brief cameo as Mrs. Kintner, the mother of Alex Kintner (Jeffrey Voorhees) who was killed in Jaws, as did Fritzi Jane Courtney, who played Mrs. Taft, one of the Amity town council members in both Jaws and Jaws 2. Cyprian R. Dube, who played Amity Selectman Mr. Posner in both Jaws and Jaws 2, is upgraded to mayor following the death of Murray Hamilton, who played Amity Mayor Larry Vaughan, in the first two Jaws films.

Gary states that one of the reasons she was attracted to the film was the idea of an on-screen romance with future Academy Award winner Michael Caine.

The first day we were to work together I was nervous as a schoolgirl. We were shooting a Junkanoo Festival with noisy drums and hundreds of extras. But he never faltered in his concentration and he put me completely at ease. It was all so natural. He's an extraordinary actor – and just a nice human being.

Caine had mixed feelings about both the production and the final version. He thinks that it was a first for him to be involved with someone his own age in a film. He compares the relationship between two middle-aged people to the romance between two teenagers. Although disappointed not to be able to collect his Academy Award for Best Supporting Actor at the 59th Academy Awards because of filming in the Bahamas, he was glad to be involved in the film. In the press release, he explains that "it is part of movie history ... the original was one of the great all-time thrillers. I thought it might be nice to be mixed up with that. I liked the script very much." However, Caine later claimed: "I have never seen it [the film], but by all accounts it is terrible. However, I have seen the house that it built, and it is terrific!" In his 1992 autobiography What's it All About?, he says that the film "will go down in my memory as the time when I won an Oscar, paid for a house and had a great holiday. Not bad for a flop movie."

Lance Guest played Ellen's elder son Mike. Guest had dropped out of his sophomore year at UCLA (1981) to appear in another sequel to a horror classic; Halloween II. Karen Young played his wife Carla. She commended the director's emphasis upon characterization.

Mario Van Peebles played Jake McCay, Michael's colleague. His father, Melvin Van Peebles, has a cameo in the film as Nassau's mayor Jason Witherspoon. Mitchell Anderson appeared as Ellen's youngest son, Sean. Lynn Whitfield played Louisa, and stunt performer Diane Hetfield played Mrs. Ferguson, the victim of the banana boat attack.

In addition to the 124 cast and crew members, 250 local extras were also hired. The majority of the extras were used as members of the local high school band, chorus and dramatic society that can be seen as the Brodys walk through the town, and during Sean's attack. A local gravestone maker produced 51 slabs for the mock graveyard used for Sean's funeral.

=== Filming ===
Principal photography for Jaws: The Revenge took place on location in New England and in the Bahamas, and completed on the Universal lot. Like the first two films of the series, Martha's Vineyard was the location of the fictional Amity Island for the film's opening scenes. Edgartown welcomed the production because it brought more business to the tourist town, which was usually very quiet in February. Production commenced on February 2, 1987, by which time "snowstorms had blanketed" the island for almost a month, "providing a frosty backdrop for the opening scenes." Cinematographer John McPherson recalls that filming in the Vineyard was very cold, and required seven generators and lots of equipment. He says the six-day shoot covered 22 pages of the script.

The cast and crew moved to Nassau in the Bahamas on February 9, beginning principal photography there the next day. Like the production of the first two films, they encountered many problems with varying weather conditions. The location did not offer the "perfect world" that the 38-day shoot required. Cover shots were filmed on shore and in interior sets. Cinematographer McPherson reports that some scenes had to be filmed across several days, presenting challenges for matching the weather.

The underwater sequences were coordinated from an 85-foot (26 m) boat called Moby II. Second unit director Jordan Klein says that it was initially challenging for the actors to get used to the "foreign environment" of performing underwater. Stunt performer Gavin McKinney stood in for Lance Guest in the scene with the moray eel because it was potentially dangerous.

Principal photography completed in Nassau on May 26, although the special effects team continued working until June 4. Production then moved to the two sets which had been constructed at Universal Studios for the Neptune's Folly sequences, and also some reshoots of Sean's death. A tank had been painted to replicate Nassau's seabed, and a huge backdrop was painted to look like the Bahamas sky. However, as John McPherson points out, the backdrop looked rather artificial, which the production had no remaining time to resolve.

The film was shot in the Super 35 format, with Arriflex cameras equipped with Zeiss Superspeed lenses for underwater sequences. Cinematographer John McPherson also supervised the underwater unit, which was headed by Pete Romano. Whereas underwater photography was normally filmed with an anamorphic lens, requiring overhead lighting, Romano filmed these "sequences with Zeiss, a 35 mm super-speed lens, which allows the natural ambiance to come through on film."

A frame from the sequence where the shark is destroyed, showing a shark model. Henry Millar was awarded for "Worst Visual Effects" at the 1987 Golden Raspberry Awards.

The special effects team, headed by Henry Millar, had arrived at South Beach, Nassau on January 12, 1987, almost a month before principal photography commenced there. In the official press release, Millar says that when he became involved "we didn't even have a script ... but as the story developed and they started telling us all what they wanted ... I knew this wasn't going to be like any other shark anyone had ever seen."

The shark was to be launched from atop an 88-foot (27 m) long platform, made from the trussed turret of a 30-foot (9.1 m) crane, and floated out into Clifton Bay. While the sharks for the first two Jaws films were pneumatically operated, the larger shark used in Revenge and the need for more precise movements led to a decision to power this shark hydraulically. According to Hydraulics & Pneumatics magazine, "the articulated shark was mounted on top of a hydraulically operated scissor lift ... which raised and lowered the shark so it would appear that he had surfaced or submerged." The carriage was capable of propelling "the shark through the water at speeds to 7 [knots]" (8.1 mph; 13 km/h). Seven sharks, or segments, were constructed from a combination of fibreglass, a metal frame and latex skin. The models were operated from a platform capable of rotating 180 degrees underwater, with a hydraulic arm operating the sharks.

Two models were fully articulated, two were made for jumping, one for ramming, one was a half shark (the top half), and one was just a fin. The two fully articulated models each had 22 sectioned ribs and movable jaws covered by a flexible water-based latex skin, measured 25 feet (7.6 m) in length and weighed 2,500 pounds (1,100 kg). Each tooth was half-a-foot long and as sharp as it looked. All models were housed under cover ... in a secret location on the island.

Universal had originally considered tasking Industrial Light & Magic to create a miniature free-swimming shark akin to the whale in Star Trek IV: The Voyage Home. The whale's designer suggested that the model could be easily converted into a shark, but its scale would be too problematic, and the proposal was aborted.

Instead, Ted Rae, who had worked on Jaws 3-D, was commissioned to create a stop-motion shark for Jaws: The Revenge. When designing and sculpturing the models, Rae tried to strike a balance between matching the full-scale sharks built by Millar, and the live action footage. Rae criticized the full-scale models, saying they "looked like a concrete log with teeth... and doesn't look as good as the shark in the first film." The animatronic puppets would subsequently appear in three or four shots in the completed film. Rae also constructed a shark and miniature boat for the climactic sequences; however, Sargent didn't like Rae's footage, and took the models to Universal for completion there.

The film company returned to Universal to finish shooting on April 2. Additional underwater photography was completed in a water tank, measuring 50 feet (15 m) by 100 feet (30 m) across, and 17 feet (5.2 m) in depth, in Universal Studio's Stage 27. Also, a replica of Nassau's Clifton Bay and its skyline was created on the man-made Falls Lake on the studio backlot. Principal photography was completed in Los Angeles on May 26. Millar's special effects team, however, remained in Nassau, completing second unit photography on June 4.

Adverse weather conditions and problems with the mechanical sharks meant that the product was delayed and exceeded its $23 million budget. Despite this, the production was hurried in order to meet the July 1987 release date. According to associate producer and production manager Frank Baur during the sequel's filming, "This [Revenge] will be the fastest I have ever seen a major film planned and executed in all of my 35 years as a production manager."

A television documentary, Behind the Scenes with Jaws: The Revenge, was broadcast in the U.S. on July 10, 1987. Twenty-two minutes in length, it was written and directed by William Rus for Zaloom Mayfield Productions.

=== Ending changes ===
In the ending of the original US theatrical version, Ellen rammed Neptune's Folly into the shark, impaling it on the prow of the boat, mortally wounding it. The shark then causes the boat to break apart with its death contortions, forcing the people on the boat to jump off to avoid going down with it. American audiences disapproved of this ending. Sid Sheinberg says that the impact of the shark and Jake dying "was too much for the audience in one finale". Following this, additional footage was filmed to portray Jake's survival, and special effects shots using miniatures which, Downey says, "saw the shark inexplicably explode after being speared by the boat". Universal used this ending on home media releases. The re-shot ending reportedly began filming only five days after the film was released in the United States. The original ending can be seen on cable broadcasts. In his review of the film, Roger Ebert said that he could not believe "[t]hat the director, Joseph Sargent, would film this final climactic scene so incompetently that there is not even an establishing shot, so we have to figure out what happened on the basis of empirical evidence."

Re-shooting the ending prevented Michael Caine from collecting his Academy Award for Best Supporting Actor for Hannah and Her Sisters in person. In a 2010 interview with Time.com, Caine said that he had asked Universal to reschedule filming, but it was not possible due to the logistics of all of the boats and equipment that was involved.

== Music ==
Jaws: The Revenge (Original Motion Picture Soundtrack)

Soundtrack album by Michael Small
- Released: 2000 (promotional); 2015 (Intrada)
- Recorded: June 3–4, 18–19 1987
- Studios: The Burbank Studios, California.
- Genre: Orchestral
- Length: 27:20 (promotional); 51:13 (Intrada)
- Label: Intrada (2015)
- Producer: Douglass Fake (2015)

Professional ratings
Review scores
Source	Rating
filmscoremonthly.com	3 stars
soundtrack.net	2.5 stars

The score was composed and conducted by Michael Small, who had previously provided music for Klute, Marathon Man (both of which featured Jaws star Roy Scheider) and The Parallax View. John Williams' original shark motif is integrated into the score which, soundtrack producer Douglass Fake says, reflects the fourth film's return to "original characters and story threads". The music for the film was recorded and mixed in June 1987 at The Burbank Studios in California.

However, much of Small's music was unused in the final film. Some phrases were "dialed out" early, some were dropped entirely, and some cues were used in scenes other than they had been written for. The changes to the film's ending also required edits to the music during post-production.

Soundtrack.net says that "Small's score is generally tense, and he comes up with a few new themes of his own." The film also contained the songs "Nail it to the Wall", performed by Stacy Lattisaw, and the 1986 hit "You Got It All", performed by The Jets. A soundtrack album was announced by MCA Records when the film opened; however, the release was cancelled following the film's disappointing performance at the box office. A promotional version of the album was released in 2000 on CD and cassette. Reviews for the soundtrack album were more positive than for the film. Indeed, writing for Film Score Monthly, AK Benjamin says that "on a CD, Small's material fares better since it's not accompanied by the film." Dismissing the film as "engagingly unwatchable", he says that "Small certainly gave Revenge a lot more than it deserved – and this a much better score than Deep Blue Sea ... whatever that means." Benjamin portrays Small as 'knowing' and his work as being superior to the film.

The hysterical coda tacked onto the end of "Revenge and Finale" is almost worth the price of the disc, as it no doubt sums up Small's opinion of the film. It's sad that the great Michael Small was delegated utter crap like Jaws the Revenge in the late '80s – and even worse that he never found his way back to the material that he deserves.

Upon Small's death in 2003, The Independent wrote that the "composer of some distinction ... had the indignity of working on one of the worst films of all time". Like most reviews of the soundtrack, the article criticizes the film whilst saying "Small produced a fine score in the circumstances, as if anyone noticed."

In 2015, Intrada Records, which previously reissued Jaws 3-D on compact disc, released the complete score. CD producer Douglass Fake was given access to the complete session mixes, meaning that the disc included every cue recorded by Small, including unused and unedited versions of the tracks.

== Release ==
The film was released in 1,606 screens in the US on July 17, 1987. It debuted in third place, behind RoboCop and a re-screening of Snow White and The Seven Dwarfs. In its opening weekend, the film grossed $7,154,890, almost half of what Jaws 3-D had grossed in its first weekend. By the end of its theatrical run, Jaws: The Revenge had grossed a worldwide total of $51,881,013 on a $23 million budget, the lowest of the entire Jaws franchise despite barely breaking even.

The film was marketed with a poster by artist Mick McGinty, with an image of the shark inspired by Roger Kastel’s original artwork for Jaws. McGinty created different versions of the poster, with and without the character (resembling Ellen Brody) on a boat in the foreground.

=== Television airings ===
Jaws: The Revenge was originally screened on AMC in the United States and on BBC1 in the United Kingdom. The AMC version includes a number of deleted and extended scenes that were removed from the original theatrical release. These include spoken narration prior to the opening credits explaining that some circumstances can be due to fate, and more dialogue between Ellen and Hoagie Newcombe (Caine) as well as between Michael and Jake. There are additional shots of the shark diving towards the submersible and slightly different angles showing Jake's death.

The film's first broadcast on BBC became notorious for showing the film in an open matte (4:3) format, rather than the 2.40:1 ratio in which the film was intended to be exhibited. This meant that some wires needed to operate the mechanical shark were visible, rather than being obscured by black bars or a pan and scan system.

=== Home media ===
Jaws: The Revenge was the first film of the series to be released on DVD. It was released on Region 1 as a 'vanilla' disc by Goodtimes, featuring Spanish and French subtitles. The feature is presented in a non-anamorphic 2.35:1 widescreen transfer. The soundtrack was presented in Dolby Digital 4.1, with one reviewer saying that the "stereo separation is great with ocean waves swirling around you, the bubbles going by during the scuba scenes, and Hoagie's airplane flying around behind you." The same reviewer praised the image transfer of McPherson's "extremely well photographed" cinematography. The film was re-released on DVD by Universal Pictures Home Entertainment on June 3, 2003, in an anamorphic transfer. In 2015, Jaws: The Revenge was re-released on DVD as part of a three movie multi-pack, along with Jaws 2 and Jaws 3-D.

Universal Pictures released Jaws: The Revenge on Blu-ray on June 14, 2016. The bonus features on the disc are the film's theatrical trailer and the restored original theatrical ending in high definition. Universal released Jaws: The Revenge on 4K Ultra HD Blu-ray on July 23, 2024, alongside Jaws 3-D. The 4K remaster was criticised for the use of AI upscaling and digital noise reduction.

== Reception ==
=== Critical response ===
Jaws: The Revenge's critical reception was largely negative. On the review aggregator website Rotten Tomatoes, 2% of 46 critics' reviews are positive, with an average rating of 2.7/10. The website's consensus reads: "Illogical, tension-free, and filled with cut-rate special effects, Jaws: The Revenge is a sorry chapter in a once-proud franchise." Metacritic, which uses a weighted average, assigned the film a score of 15 out of 100, based on 15 critics, indicating "overwhelming dislike". Audiences polled by CinemaScore gave the film an average grade of "C−" on an A+ to F scale.

For her performance, Gary was nominated for both a Saturn Award for Best Actress and a Golden Raspberry Award for Worst Actress; she lost to Jessica Tandy for *batteries not included and Madonna for Who's That Girl, respectively. It was rated by Entertainment Weekly as one of "The 25 Worst Sequels Ever Made". It was voted number 22 by readers of Empire magazine in their list of "The 50 Worst Movies Ever".

Roger Ebert of the Chicago Sun-Times gave the film zero stars, writing in his review that it "is not simply a bad movie, but also a stupid and incompetent one." He lists several elements that he finds unbelievable, including that Ellen is "haunted by flashbacks to events where she was not present". Ebert joked that Caine could not attend the ceremony to accept his Academy Award for Best Supporting Actor earned for Hannah and Her Sisters because of his shooting commitments on this film, because he may not have wanted to return to the shoot if he had left it. On their review show, both Ebert and his colleague Gene Siskel slated the film, also pointing out a number of "logical errors amongst many logical errors" including a scene near the end where Michael Caine's shirt is dry despite the character having just hauled himself out of the water. Siskel concluded his review by saying "let's hope this is the end of the Jaws series".

Critics also addressed the implausibility of some aspects of the plot. Given the Brodys' history, Caryn James of The New York Times asked "Why hasn't this family moved to Nebraska?" The sequence in which the shark "literally leaps out of the water and can roar like a lion" became so notorious that it inspired the title of the 2022 making-of book The Shark is Roaring. Other implausible elements include the shark swimming from an island in the northeastern United States to the Bahamas (approx. 1,920 km (1,193 mi; 1,037 nmi)) in less than three days, somehow knowing that the Brody family went to the Bahamas, or following Michael through an underwater labyrinth, as well as the implication of such a creature seeking revenge. The Independent pointed out that "the film was riddled with inconsistencies [and] errors (sharks cannot float or roar like lions)". Consequently, Entertainment Weekly pointed out that the promotional material's claim that it is "the most incredible" Jaws film is "technically correct".

In contrast, however, I.Q. Hunter writes, "the cheap shark effects aren’t especially disastrous considering what was possible before CGI." Derek Winnert ends his otherwise lukewarm review by stating, "the Bahamas backdrops are pretty and the shark looks as toothsome as ever". Critics commented upon the sepia-toned flashbacks to the first film. A scene with Michael and Thea Brody (Judith Barsi) imitating each other is interspersed with shots from a similar scene in Jaws of Sean (Jay Mello) and Martin Brody. Similarly, the shark's destruction contains footage of Martin Brody aiming at the compressed air tank, saying "Smile, you son of a ... ". Caryn James comments that "nothing kills a sequel faster than reverence ... Joseph Sargent, the director, has turned this into a color-by-numbers version of Steven Spielberg's original Jaws."

In a 2019 scholarly article, I.Q. Hunter argues that the film "is valuable as a case study because it is not a ‘standard’ SoBIG ["so bad it's good"] failure. It is neither a weird anomaly with a passionate and visible fan-base, nor the product of an archaic cash-strapped production context, nor was it a massive flop, redolent of budgetary overkill and artistic vanity." In contrast to films such as The Room and Plan 9 from Outer Space, which are framed either as "at odds with the norms of mainstream Hollywood" and created by "passionate, but hopelessly untalented" filmmakers, Jaws: The Revenge's position within the Hollywood system renders it "by universal consensus, a very bad film."

=== Accolades ===
Awards and nominations
Award	Category	Nominee	Result	Ref.
15th Saturn Awards	Best Actress	Lorraine Gary	Nominated	
8th Golden Raspberry Awards	Worst Actor	"Bruce the Shark"	Nominated	
8th Golden Raspberry Awards	Worst Actress	Lorraine Gary	Nominated	
8th Golden Raspberry Awards	Worst Supporting Actor	Michael Caine	Nominated	
8th Golden Raspberry Awards	Worst Screenplay	Michael de Guzman	Nominated	
8th Golden Raspberry Awards	Worst Picture	Joseph Sargent	Nominated	
8th Golden Raspberry Awards	Worst Director	Joseph Sargent	Nominated	
8th Golden Raspberry Awards	Worst Visual Effects	Henry Millar	Won	

=== Legacy ===
The increasing number of sequels in the Jaws series was spoofed in the 1989 film Back to the Future Part II (whose preceding film was produced by Steven Spielberg and featured Jaws 3 star Lea Thompson), when Marty McFly (Michael J. Fox) travels to the year 2015 and sees a theater showing Jaws 19 (fictionally directed by Max Spielberg), with the tagline "This time it's REALLY REALLY personal!". This alludes to the tagline of Jaws: The Revenge, "This time it's personal." After being "attacked" by a promotional volumetric image of the shark outside the theatre, Marty says "the shark still looks fake." In celebration of "Back to the Future Day" in 2015, Universal released a parody trailer for Jaws 19, where the sequels after The Revenge would have included sharks in various environments, prequels, and even a love story titled Jaws 17: Fifty Scales of Grey.

The film is listed in Golden Raspberry Award founder John Wilson's book The Official Razzie Movie Guide as one of The 100 Most Enjoyably Bad Movies Ever Made.

== Novelization ==
Jaws: The Revenge
- Paperback edition, with Mick McGinty's artwork
- Author: Hank Searls
- Language: English
- Genre: Novelization
- Publisher: Berkley Books
- Publication date: July 1, 1987
- Publication place: United States
- Media type: Print (Paperback)
- Pages: 195 pp.
- ISBN: 0-425-10546-6
- OCLC: 79936995

The novelization was written by Hank Searls, who also adapted Jaws 2. While Searls' Jaws 2 novelization was based on an earlier draft of that film and was significantly different from the finished film, his Jaws: The Revenge novelization sticks fairly close to the final film, although it does contain some extra subplots to, as Paul Downey writes, "establish a more cohesive plot". The novel contains a subplot in which Hoagie is a government agent and he transports laundered money. The only reference to this in the film is when Michael Brody asks, "What do you do when you're not flying people?" to which Hoagie replies, "I deliver laundry." In Searls' novel, the character of Jake is ultimately killed by the shark; Jake was originally supposed to die in the film, but the script was changed to allow him to survive.

The novelization suggests that the shark may be acting under the influence of a vengeful voodoo witch-doctor (who has a feud with the Brody family), and the shark's apparent revenge has magical implications. Taken from the earlier drafts of the screenplay, the shark is directed by a voodoo curse laid by Papa Jacques, a Haitian witch-doctor. Film scholar I.Q. Hunter explains, "The revenge of the title is, therefore, Papa Jacques’ and not the shark's, which entirely changes the story's meaning: the shark, impelled by ‘stranger forces man could never understand,’ is an instrument of postcolonial revenge." Searls explained to the Poughkeepsie Journal that "in the book, I don't contend that the shark is thinking at all. That's why I've got the voodoo guy standing in for him." Searls says that it works in the book, but it was "too corny" for the film. However, at one point in the theatrical version, Michael Brody says, "Come on, sharks don't commit murder. Tell me you don't believe in that voodoo."

Reviews of the novel were mixed. Author and journalist Matt Serafini calls it a "fast-moving and vivid read", rating it higher than the actual movie. However, writing for the Miami Herald, Joe Achenbach calls it "the literary equivalent of a sausage".

== See also ==
- List of films considered the worst
- List of killer shark films

== Bibliography ==
- Biodrowski, Steven (September 1987). "Jaws: the revenge - Stop-motion shark by Ted Rae abandoned by a hurried production". Cinefantastique. 17 (5). Oak Park, IL: Frederick S. Clarke: 14. ISSN 0145-6032.
- Brickman, Barbara Jane (2011). "Brothers, Sisters, and Chainsaws: The Slasher Film as Locus for Sibling Rivalry". Quarterly Review of Film and Video. 28 (2): 135–154. doi:10.1080/10509200802530155.
- Caine, Michael (1992). What's it All About. Century. ISBN 0-7126-3567-X.
- Downey, Paul (2017). "Remember The Kill? Mitchell Anderson reflects on 30 years of Jaws: The Revenge". Scream - the Horror Magazine (43): 28–30. ISSN 2045-2128.
- Downey, Paul (2022). The Shark is Roaring – The Story of Jaws: The Revenge. BearManor Media. ISBN 978-1629339726.
- Field, Matthew (2014). Michael Caine: You're a Big Man. Pavilion Books. ISBN 9781849942515.
- Gross, Edward (August 1987). "'Jaws: the revenge' - Reeling in the fourth killer shark movie". Fangoria (66). New York, NY: O'Quinn Studios: 24–27.
- Hunter, I.Q. (2019). "Jaws: the revenge and the production of failure". Continuum: Journal of Media & Cultural Studies. 33 (6): 677–691. doi:10.1080/10304312.2019.1677981. hdl:2086/16764. S2CID 210613770.
- Loock, Kathleen (2020). "'Just when you thought it was safe...' The Jaws sequels". In Hunter, !.Q.; Melia, Matthew (eds.). The Jaws Book. New York, NY: Bloomsbury Academic. ISBN 978-1-5013-7386-2.
- McKinney, Ross (April 2019). "Clinical Research Is a Team Sport". American Journal of Bioethics. 19 (4): 22–23. doi:10.1080/15265161.2019.1574494. ISSN 1526-5161. PMID 31544676.
- Oliver, T (December 1987). "The Brody family gets jawed again: special-effects shark winks, swims, dives, turns, wiggles, and chomps hydraulically in "Jaws the Revenge."". Hydraulics & Pneumatics. 40 (12). ISSN 0002-7928.
- Turner, George (August 1987). "Jaws: the revenge is complete". American Cinematographer. 68: 42. ISSN 0002-7928.
- Wilson, John (2005). The Official Razzie Movie Guide: Enjoying the Best of Hollywood's Worst. Grand Central Publishing. ISBN 0-446-69334-0.
- Winnert, Derek (1993). Radio Times Film & Video Guide 1994. London: Hodder & Stoughton. ISBN 0-340-57477-1.
