= List of American films of 1978 =

This is a list of American films released in 1978.

== Box office ==
The highest-grossing American films released in 1978, by domestic box office gross revenue, are as follows:

Highest-grossing films of 1978
Rank	Title	Distributor	Domestic gross
1	Grease	Paramount	$159,978,870
2	Superman	Warner Bros.	$134,218,018
3	National Lampoon’s Animal House	Universal	$120,091,123
4	Every Which Way but Loose	Warner Bros.	$85,196,485
5	Heaven Can Wait	Paramount	$81,640,278
6	Hooper	Warner Bros.	$78,000,000
7	Jaws 2	Universal	$77,737,272
8	Revenge of the Pink Panther	United Artists	$49,579,269
9	The Deer Hunter	Universal	$48,979,328
10	Halloween	Compass International	$47,000,000

== January–March ==
Opening		Title	Production company	Cast and crew	Ref.
J A N U A R Y	6	Coma	United Artists	Michael Crichton (director/screenplay); Geneviève Bujold, Michael Douglas, Elizabeth Ashley, Rip Torn, Richard Widmark, Lois Chiles, Hari Rhodes, Richard Doyle, Lance LeGault, Tom Selleck, Joanna Kerns, Ed Harris, Philip Baker Hall	
J A N U A R Y	6	September 30, 1955	Universal Pictures	James Bridges (director/screenplay); Richard Thomas, Susan Tyrrell, Collin Wilcox, Lisa Blount, Tom Hulce, Dennis Quaid, Dennis Christopher, Deborah Benson, Mary Kai Clark, Ben Fuhrman	
J A N U A R Y	11	Get Out Your Handkerchiefs	Compagnie Commerciale Française / Cinématographique	Bertrand Blier (director/screenplay); Gérard Depardieu, Patrick Dewaere, Carole Laure, Michel Serrault, Sylvie Joly, Riton Liebman, Liliane Rovère, Michel Beaune, Gilberte Géniat, Eléonore Hilt, Jean Rougerie	
J A N U A R Y	25	Renaldo and Clara	Circuit Films	Bob Dylan (director/screenplay); Sam Shepard (screenplay); Bob Dylan, Sara Dylan, Joan Baez, Ronnie Hawkins, Ronee Blakley, Ramblin' Jack Elliott, Harry Dean Stanton, Bob Neuwirth, Allen Ginsberg, David Mansfield, Helena Kallianiotes, Rubin "Hurricane" Carter, Scarlet Rivera, Roger McGuinn, David Blue, Joni Mitchell, Rob Stoner, Steven Soles, Mick Ronson, Anne Waldman, T-Bone Burnett, Larry Sloman, Sam Shepard, Howie Wyeth, Arlen Roth, Arlo Guthrie, Roberta Flack, Phil Ochs, Mel Howard, Jack Baran, Mama Maria Frasca, Mad Bear, Ruth Tyrangel, Denise Mercedes, Linda Thomases, Sheila Shotton, Kevin Crossley, Hal Frazier, M. Will, Luther Rix, Andre Bernard Tremblay, Dominic Paulo, Claudia Carr	
J A N U A R Y	27	The Class of Miss MacMichael	Gala Film Distributors / Brut Productions / Kettledrum Films	Silvio Narizzano (director); Judd Bernard (screenplay); Glenda Jackson, Oliver Reed, Michael Murphy, Rosalind Cash, John Standing, Phil Daniels, Pamela Manson	
J A N U A R Y	27	Mean Dog Blues	American International Pictures / Bing Crosby Productions	Mel Stuart (director); George Lefferts (screenplay); Gregg Henry, Kay Lenz, Scatman Crothers, Tina Louise, George Kennedy, Felton Perry, Gregory Sierra, James Wainwright, William Windom	
J A N U A R Y	29	A Night Full of Rain	Warner Bros.	Lina Wertmüller (director/screenplay); Giancarlo Giannini, Candice Bergen, Michael Tucker, Lucio Amelio, Massimo Wertmüller, Flora Carabella, Jill Eikenberry, Lilli Carati, Mario Scarpetta, Anny Papa, Anne Byrne Hoffman, Anita Paltrinieri, Giuliana Carnescecchi, Alice Columbo Oxman, Paola Ojetti, Enzo Vitale, Paola Silvia Rotunno, John West Buchanan, Alison Tucker	
F E B R U A R Y	2	The Boys in Company C	Columbia Pictures / Golden Harvest / Good Times Films S.A.	Sidney J. Furie (director/screenplay); Rick Natkin (screenplay); Stan Shaw, Andrew Stevens, Michael Lembeck, Craig Wasson, Scott Hylands, James Whitmore Jr., Noble Willingham, R. Lee Ermey, Vic Diaz, James Canning	
F E B R U A R Y	3	Jubilee		Derek Jarman (director/screenplay); Christopher Hobbs (screenplay); Jenny Runacre, Jordan, Little Nell, Toyah Willcox, Adam Ant, Wayne County, Hermine Demoriane, Ian Charleson, Karl Johnson, Linda Spurrier, Orlando, Richard O'Brien, Helen Wellington-Lloyd, Claire Davenport, Barney James, Lindsay Kemp, Gene October, David Haughton, Siouxsie Sioux, Steven Severin	
F E B R U A R Y	3	The One and Only	Paramount Pictures / First Artists	Carl Reiner (director); Steve Gordon (screenplay); Henry Winkler, Kim Darby, Gene Saks, William Daniels, Polly Holliday, Hervé Villechaize, Ed Begley Jr., Warren Stevens, Hard Boiled Haggerty, Ralph Manza, Chavo Guerrero Sr., Dennis James, Rowdy Roddy Piper	
F E B R U A R Y	9	The Betsy	United Artists / Allied Artists / Harold Robbins International Company	Daniel Petrie (director); William Bast, Walter Bernstein (screenplay); Laurence Olivier, Robert Duvall, Katharine Ross, Tommy Lee Jones, Jane Alexander, Lesley-Anne Down, Kathleen Beller, Joseph Wiseman, Edward Herrmann, Paul Ryan Rudd, Charlie Fields	
F E B R U A R Y	10	Blue Collar	Universal Pictures / T.A.T. Communications Company	Paul Schrader (director/screenplay); Leonard Schrader (screenplay); Richard Pryor, Harvey Keitel, Yaphet Kotto, Ed Begley Jr., Harry Bellaver, George Memmoli, Lucy Saroyan, Lane Smith, Cliff DeYoung, Chip Fields, Harry Northup, Milton Selzer, Borah Silver, Leonard Gaines, Sammy Warren, Jimmy Martinez	
F E B R U A R Y	10	The Other Side of the Mountain Part 2	Universal Pictures / Filmways	Larry Peerce (director); Douglas Day Stewart (screenplay); Marilyn Hassett, Timothy Bottoms, Nan Martin, Belinda Montgomery, Gretchen Corbett	
F E B R U A R Y	15	Coming Home	United Artists / Jerome Hellman Productions / Jayne Productions Inc.	Hal Ashby (director); Waldo Salt, Robert C. Jones (screenplay); Jane Fonda, Jon Voight, Bruce Dern, Penelope Milford, Robert Carradine, Robert Ginty, Kathleen Miller, Willie Tyler, Charles Cyphers, Olivia Cole, Tresa Hughes, Bruce French, Mary Jackson, Richard Lawson, Rita Taggart, Pat Corley, David Clennon, Marc McClure, Mary Gregory, Beeson Carroll, Lou Carello, Tim Pelt, Claudie Watson, Sally Frei, Gwen Van Dam, Jim Klein, Tokyo Ernie, Stacey Pickren, Arthur Rosenberg, Danny Tucker	
F E B R U A R Y	15	The Serpent's Egg	Paramount Pictures	Ingmar Bergman (director/screenplay); Liv Ullmann, David Carradine, Gert Fröbe, Heinz Bennent, James Whitmore, Glynn Turman, Edith Heerdegen, Hans Quest, Paula Braend, Walter Schmidinger, Lisi Mangold, Grischa Huber, Isolde Barth, Kai Fischer, Gaby Dohm, Christian Berkel, Charles Regnier, Günter Meisner, Hertha von Walther	
F E B R U A R Y	17	Record City	American International Pictures / Aubrey Company	Dennis Steinmetz (director); Ron Friedman (screenplay); Ed Begley Jr., Sorrell Booke, Michael Callan, Jack Carter, Frank Gorshin, Ruth Buzzi, Dennis Bowen, Leonard Barr, Rick Dees, Kinky Friedman, Alice Ghostley, Joe Higgins, Ted Lange, Alan Oppenheimer, Harold Sakata, Wendy Schaal, Larry Storch, John Halsey, Tony Giorgio, Tim Thomerson, Susan Tolsky, Jeff Altman, Stuart Goetz, Maria Grimm, Isaac Ruiz, Elliott Street	
F E B R U A R Y	17	The Toolbox Murders	Cal-Am Artists / Tony DiDio Productions	Dennis Donnelly (director); Ann Kindberg, Robert Easter, Neva Friedenn (screenplay); Cameron Mitchell, Pamelyn Ferdin, Wesley Eure, Tim Donnelly, Aneta Corsaut, Evelyn Guerrero, Don Diamond, Kelly Nichols, Kathleen O'Malley, James Nolan, Nicholas Beauvy, Faith McSwain, Marciee Drake, Betty Cole, John Hawker	
M A R C H	1	And the Devil is Their Third Accomplice	Union Films and Dollar Films	Gamal Hamad (screenplay); Mervat Amin, Mahmoud Yassin, Farouk al-Fishawy	
M A R C H	2	Fingers	Brut Productions	James Toback (director/screenplay); Harvey Keitel, Tisa Farrow, Michael V. Gazzo, Jim Brown, Tanya Roberts, Marian Seldes, Danny Aiello, Ed Marinaro, Tony Sirico, Dominic Chianese, Largo Woodruff, Sam Coppola	
M A R C H	2	Laserblast	Irwin Yablans Company	Michael Rae (director); Frank Ray Perilli, Franne Schacht (screenplay); Kim Milford, Cheryl Smith, Gianni Russo, Roddy McDowall, Keenan Wynn, Dennis Burkley, Eddie Deezen, Ron Masak, Barry Cutler, Mike Bobenko, Rick Walters, Joanna Lipari, Wendy Wernli	
M A R C H	2	Sextette	Crown International Pictures	Ken Hughes (director); Herbert Baker (screenplay); Mae West, Timothy Dalton, Dom DeLuise, Tony Curtis, Ringo Starr, Keith Moon, George Hamilton, Alice Cooper, Walter Pidgeon, Van McCoy, Rona Barrett, Regis Philbin, George Raft, Gil Stratton	
M A R C H	2	Tomorrow Never Comes	Cinépix Film Properties	Peter Collinson (director); Sydney Banks, David Pursall, Jack Seddon (screenplay); Oliver Reed, Susan George, Raymond Burr, John Ireland, Stephen McHattie, Donald Pleasence, Paul Koslo, John Osborne, Cec Linder, Richard Donat, Delores Etienne	
M A R C H	5	An Unmarried Woman	20th Century Fox	Paul Mazursky (director/screenplay); Jill Clayburgh, Alan Bates, Michael Murphy, Cliff Gorman, Pat Quinn, Kelly Bishop, Lisa Lucas, Linda Miller, Daniel Seltzer, Matthew Arkin, Novella Nelson, Raymond J. Barry, Jill Eikenberry, Andrew Duncan, Penelope Russianoff, Ivan Karp	
M A R C H	8	The Evil	New World Pictures / Rangoon Productions	Gus Trikonis (director/screenplay); Galen Thompson (screenplay); Richard Crenna, Joanna Pettet, Andrew Prine, Cassie Yates, Victor Buono, Lynne Moody, Mary Louise Weller, Robert Viharo, Milton Selzer, Ed Bakey, George O'Hanlon Jr., Galen Thompson	
M A R C H	10	Coach	Crown International Pictures / Marimark Productions	Bud Townsend (director); Stephen Bruce Rose, Nancy Larson, Mark Tenser (screenplay); Cathy Lee Crosby, Michael Biehn, Keenan Wynn, Meridith Baer, Brent Huff, Rosanne Katon, Otto Felix, Sidney Wicks, Channing Clarkson, Steve Nevil, Jack David Walker, Myron McGill, Robyn Pohle, Kristine Greco, Cindy Daly, Lenka Novak, Milt Oberman, Bill McLean, Patricia Garrison, Ted Dawson, Nate Roth, Barbara Minkus, Ron Wright	
M A R C H	10	Gray Lady Down	Universal Pictures	David Greene (director); James Whittaker, Howard Sackler (screenplay); Charlton Heston, David Carradine, Stacy Keach, Ned Beatty, Ronny Cox, Stephen McHattie, Rosemary Forsyth, Dorian Harewood, Hilly Hicks, Charles Cioffi, William Jordan, Jack Rader, Michael O'Keefe, Charlie Robinson, Christopher Reeve, Melendy Britt, Robert Symonds, Ted Gehring, Charles Cyphers, Michael Cavanaugh, Robert Ito	
M A R C H	10	Return from Witch Mountain	Walt Disney Productions / Buena Vista Distribution	John Hough (director); Malcolm Marmorstein (screenplay); Bette Davis, Christopher Lee, Kim Richards, Ike Eisenmann, Jack Soo, Anthony James, Richard Bakalyan, Ward Costello, Christian Juttner, Brad Savage, Jeffrey Jacquet, Stu Gilliam, William Bassett, Denver Pyle, Brian Part, Poindexter Yothers, Helene Winston	
M A R C H	10	The Fury	20th Century Fox / Frank Yablans Presentations	Brian De Palma (director); John Farris (screenplay); Kirk Douglas, John Cassavetes, Carrie Snodgress, Charles Durning, Amy Irving, Andrew Stevens, Fiona Lewis, Rutanya Alda, William Finley, Dennis Franz, Alice Nunn, Melody Thomas Scott, Hilary Thompson, Patrick Billingsley, Gordon Jump, Daryl Hannah, Laura Innes, Betty Buckley, Carol Rossen, Joyce Easton, Jane Lambert, Sam Laws, J. Patrick McNamara, J.P. Bumstead	
M A R C H	13	The Big Sleep	United Artists / ITC Entertainment	Michael Winner (director/screenplay); Robert Mitchum, Sarah Miles, Richard Boone, Candy Clark, Joan Collins, Edward Fox, John Mills, James Stewart, Oliver Reed, Harry Andrews, Colin Blakely, Richard Todd, Diana Quick, James Donald, John Justin, Simon Fisher Turner, Martin Potter	
M A R C H	15	House Calls	Universal Pictures	Howard Zieff (director); Alan Mandel, Charles Shyer (screenplay); Walter Matthau, Glenda Jackson, Art Carney, Richard Benjamin, Candice Azzara, Dick O'Neill, Thayer David, Anthony Holland, Reva Rose, Sandra Kerns, Brad Dexter, Jane Connell, Lloyd Gough, Gordon Jump, Bill Fiore, Taurean Blacque, Charles Matthau, Ken Olfson, Len Lesser, Nancy Hsueh, Lee Weaver, Susan Batson, Alma Beltran, John Pleshette	
M A R C H	17	American Hot Wax	Paramount Pictures	Floyd Mutrux (director); John Kaye (screenplay); Tim McIntire, Fran Drescher, Jay Leno, Laraine Newman, Moosie Drier, Jeff Altman, Richard Perry, Chuck Berry, Jerry Lee Lewis, Screamin' Jay Hawkins, Frankie Ford, Arnold McCuller, Brenda Russell, Jo Ann Harris, Kenny Vance, Joe Esposito, Bruce Sudano, Ed Hokenson, John Lehne, Charles Greene, Carl Earl Weaver, Al Chalk, Sam Harkness, Stephanie Spruill, Joyce King, Yolanda Howard, Charles Irwin, Jeanne Sheffield	
M A R C H	17	Casey's Shadow	Columbia Pictures / Rastar	Martin Ritt (director); Carol Sobieski (screenplay); Walter Matthau, Alexis Smith, Murray Hamilton, Robert Webber, Andrew Rubin, Harry Caesar, Joel Fluellen, Whit Bissell, Stephan Gerard Burns, Susan Myers, Michael Hershewe, James M. Halty, William Pitt, Dean Turpitt, Sanders Delhomme	
M A R C H	17	An Enemy of the People	Warner Bros. / First Artists	George Schaefer (director); Alexander Jacobs (screenplay); Steve McQueen, Charles Durning, Bibi Andersson, Eric Christmas, Michael Cristofer, Richard Dysart, Michael Higgins, Richard Bradford, Ham Larsen, John Levin, Robin Pearson Rose	
M A R C H	18	Straight Time	Warner Bros. / First Artists	Ulu Grosbard (director); Alvin Sargent, Edward Bunker, Jeffrey Boam (screenplay); Dustin Hoffman, Harry Dean Stanton, Gary Busey, Theresa Russell, M. Emmet Walsh, Kathy Bates, Rita Taggart, Sandy Baron, Jake Busey, Edward Bunker	
M A R C H	23	Game of Death	Columbia Pictures / Golden Harvest	Robert Clouse, Sammo Hung (directors); Jan Spears (screenplay): Bruce Lee, Gig Young, Dean Jagger, Colleen Camp, Kim Tai-jong, Yuen Biao, Robert Wall, Hugh O'Brian, Dan Inosanto, Kareem Abdul-Jabbar, Mel Novak, Sammo Hung, Ji Han-jae, James Tien, Roy Chiao, Chuck Norris, Alan Chui Chung-San, Lam Ching-ying, Mars, Lau Kar-wing, Fung Hark-On, Tony Leung, Billy McGill, Jim James, Russell Cawthorne, John Ladalski, David Hu, Don Barry, Jess Hardie, Eddie Dye, Peter Nelson, Peter Gee, Peter Chan, Tai San, Jason Williams	

== April–June ==
Opening		Title	Production company	Cast and crew	Ref.
A P R I L	5	Pretty Baby	Paramount Pictures	Louis Malle (director); Polly Platt (screenplay); Brooke Shields, Keith Carradine, Susan Sarandon, Frances Faye, Antonio Fargas, Diana Scarwid, Barbara Steele, Seret Scott, Gerrit Graham, Mae Mercer, Matthew Anton, Cheryl Markowitz, Susan Manskey, Laura Zimmerman, Miz Mary	
A P R I L	7	Dot and the Kangaroo	Hoyts / Yoram Gross Films	Yoram Gross (director/screenplay); John Palmer (screenplay); Barbara Frawley, Joan Bruce, Spike Milligan, June Salter, Ross Higgins, Ron Haddrick, Lola Brooks, Peter Gwynne, Richard Meikle	
A P R I L	9	Rabbit Test	AVCO Embassy Pictures / Laugh or Die / Melvin Simon Productions	Joan Rivers (director/screenplay); Jay Redack (screenplay); Billy Crystal, Joan Prather, Alex Rocco, Doris Roberts, Billy Barty, Imogene Coca, Richard Deacon, Norman Fell, Fannie Flagg, Alice Ghostley, Roosevelt Grier, George Gobel, Paul Lynde, Roddy McDowall, Sheree North, Charles Pierce, Tom Poston, Charlotte Rae, Jimmie Walker, Michael Keaton, Joan Rivers, Ron Rifkin	
A P R I L	12	Deathsport	New World Pictures	Allan Arkush, Roger Corman (directors); Nicholas Niciphor (director/screenplay); Donald E. Stewart (screenplay); David Carradine, Claudia Jennings, Richard Lynch, William Smithers, David McLean, Jesse Vint, H.B. Haggerty, Brenda Venus, Will Walker, Peter Hooper	
A P R I L	14	The Medusa Touch	ITC Entertainment / Coatesgold / Bulldog / Citeca Productions	Jack Gold (director); John Briley (screenplay); Richard Burton, Lino Ventura, Lee Remick, Harry Andrews, Alan Badel, Marie-Christine Barrault, Jeremy Brett, Michael Hordern, Gordon Jackson, Derek Jacobi, Robert Lang, Michael Byrne, John Normington, Robert Flemyng, Philip Stone, Malcolm Tierney, Norman Bird, Jennifer Jayne, Avril Elgar, James Hazeldine, David de Keyser, Gordon Honeycombe, James Burke	
A P R I L	14	Passion Flower Hotel	Atlantic Releasing Corporation / Audifilm	André Farwagi (director); Ken Globus, Paul Nicholas (screenplay); Nastassja Kinski, Gerry Sundquist, Sean Chapman, Marion Kracht, Fabiana Udenio, Kurt Raab, Stefano D'Amato, Gabriele Blum, Veronique Delbourg, Nigel Graves, Carolin Ohrner	
A P R I L	14	The Scenic Route	New Line Cinema	Mark Rappaport (director/screenplay); Randy Danson, Marilyn Jones, Kevin Wade	
A P R I L	20	Dawn of the Dead	United Film Distribution Company / Laurel Group	George A. Romero (director/screenplay); David Emge, Ken Foree, Scott Reiniger, Gaylen Ross, George A. Romero, Christine Forrest, David Early, Howard Smith, Richard France, Tony Buba, Pasquale Buba, Taso N. Stavrakis, Tom Savini, Joseph Pilato, James A. Baffico, John Amplas, David Crawford, Daniel Dietrich, Molly McClosky, Rudy Ricci, Joey Baffico	
A P R I L	20	Silver Saddle	Adria Filmverleih / Jupiter-Film	Lucio Fulci (director); Adriano Bolzoni (screenplay); Giuliano Gemma, Ettore Manni, Cinzia Monreale, Licinia Lentini, Donald O'Brien, Aldo Sambrell, Philippe Hersent, Geoffrey Lewis, Sven Valsecchi, Gianni De Luigi	
A P R I L	21	Five Days from Home	Universal Pictures / Long Rifle Productions	George Peppard (director); William Moore (screenplay); George Peppard, Sherry Boucher, Neville Brand, Robert Donner, Ronnie Claire Edwards, Savannah Smith Boucher, Victor Campos, Jessie Lee Fulton, William Larsen, Robert Magruder	
A P R I L	21	I Wanna Hold Your Hand	Universal Pictures	Robert Zemeckis (director/screenplay); Bob Gale (screenplay); Nancy Allen, Bobby Di Cicco, Marc McClure, Theresa Saldana, Wendie Jo Sperber, Eddie Deezen, Christian Juttner, Will Jordan, Read Morgan, James Houghton, Dick Miller, Kristine DeBell, Murray the K, Leslie Hoffman, Susan Kendall Newman, Richard Singer, Claude Earl Jones, James Hewitson	
A P R I L	21	Jennifer	American International Pictures	Brice Mack (director); Kay Cousins Johnson (screenplay); Lisa Pelikan, Bert Convy, Nina Foch, John Gavin, Jeff Corey, Wesley Eure, Amy Johnston, Florida Friebus, Lillian Randolph, Daniel Magder, Louise Hoven, Ray Underwood, Georganne La Piere, Domingo Ambriz	
A P R I L	21	Silver Bears	Columbia Pictures / EMI Films	Ivan Passer (director); Paul Erdman, Peter Stone (screenplay); Michael Caine, Cybill Shepherd, Louis Jourdan, Stéphane Audran, David Warner, Tom Smothers, Martin Balsam, Joss Ackland, Charles Gray, Jay Leno, Jeremy Clyde	
A P R I L	26	F.I.S.T.	United Artists / Chateau Productions / Huron Productions Inc.	Norman Jewison (director); Joe Eszterhas, Sylvester Stallone (screenplay); Sylvester Stallone, Rod Steiger, Peter Boyle, Melinda Dillon, David Huffman, Kevin Conway, Tony Lo Bianco, Cassie Yates, Peter Donat, Frank McRae, Henry Wilcoxon, Richard Herd, Ken Kercheval, James Karen, Stuart Gillard, Brian Dennehy, Nada Rowand, Sam Chew Jr., John Bleifer, Cole Dammett, Bruce McGill, Tony Mendia, Rozsika Halmos, Elena Karam, John Lehne, Deanne Fator, Jack Slate, James Jeter, Ron Delagardelle, Hugo Bolba, M. Patrick Hughes, Reid Cruickshanks, Chuck Gradi, Earl Montgomery, Vincent Williams	
A P R I L	26	The Last Waltz	United Artists	Martin Scorsese (director); Rick Danko, Levon Helm, Garth Hudson, Richard Manuel, Robbie Robertson, Eric Clapton, Neil Diamond, Bob Dylan, Joni Mitchell, Neil Young, Emmylou Harris, Van Morrison, The Staples, Dr. John, Muddy Waters, Paul Butterfield, Ronnie Hawkins, Ringo Starr, Ron Wood	
A P R I L	28	FM	Universal Pictures	John A. Alonzo (director); Ezra Sacks (screenplay); Michael Brandon, Eileen Brennan, Alex Karras, Cleavon Little, Martin Mull, Cassie Yates, Norman Lloyd, James Keach, Robert Patten, Linda Ronstadt, Jimmy Buffett, Tom Petty, REO Speedwagon, Jay Fenichel, Joe Smith, Tom Tarpey	
A P R I L	28	The Manitou	AVCO Embassy Pictures / Herman Weist & Associates / Melvin Simon Productions	William Girdler (director/screenplay); Jon Cedar, Thomas Pope (screenplay); Tony Curtis, Michael Ansara, Susan Strasberg, Stella Stevens, Jon Cedar, Ann Sothern, Burgess Meredith, Paul Mantee, Jeanette Nolan, Lurene Tuttle, Hugh Corcoran	
A P R I L	30	The Stud	Brent Walker Film Distributing / Artoc Films	Quentin Masters (director); Dave Humphries, Christopher Stagg (screenplay); Joan Collins, Oliver Tobias, Sue Lloyd, Walter Gotell, Mark Burns, Doug Fisher, Natalie Ogle, Constantin De Goguel, Sarah Lawson, Jeremy Child, Peter Dennis, Chris Jagger, Minah Bird, Hilda Fenemore, John Conteh, Milo Sperber, Suzanne Danielle, Susie Silvey, Emma Jacobs, Peter Lukas, Guy Ward, Peter Bourke, Tania Rogers, Felicity Buirski, Sharon Fussey, Bernard Stone	
M A Y	5	Warlords of Atlantis	Columbia Pictures	Kevin Connor (director); Brian Hayles (screenplay); Doug McClure, Peter Gilmore, Shane Rimmer, Lea Brodie, Michael Gothard, Hal Galili, John Ratzenberger, Derry Power, Donald Bisset, Ashley Knight, Robert Brown, Cyd Charisse, Daniel Massey	
M A Y	10	A Different Story	AVCO Embassy Pictures / American Cinema Releasing / Petersen Films	Paul Aaron (director); Henry Olek (screenplay); Meg Foster, Perry King, Valerie Curtin, Peter Donat, Richard Bull, Burke Byrnes, Barbara Collentine, Guerin Barry, Doug Higgins, Lisa James	
M A Y	10	It Lives Again	Warner Bros. / Larco Productions	Larry Cohen (director/screenplay); Frederic Forrest, Kathleen Lloyd, John P. Ryan, John Marley, Andrew Duggan, Eddie Constantine, Bobby Ramsen, Glenda Young, Melissa Inger, Jill Gatsb, Lynn Wood, Dennis O'Flaherty, James Dixon	
M A Y	10	The End	United Artists / Gordon-Reynolds Productions	Burt Reynolds (director); Jerry Belson (screenplay); Burt Reynolds, Dom DeLuise, Sally Field, Strother Martin, David Steinberg, Joanne Woodward, Norman Fell, Myrna Loy, Kristy McNichol, Pat O'Brien, Robby Benson, Carl Reiner, Bill Ewing, James Best, Frank McRae, Jock Mahoney	
M A Y	10	Martin	Libra Films / Laurel Tape and Film / Braddock Associates	George A. Romero (director/screenplay); John Amplas, Lincoln Maazel, Christine Forrest, Tom Savini, George A. Romero, Tony Buba, Pasquale Buba, Elayne Nadeau, Sara Venable, Fran Middleton, Roger Caine, J. Clifford Forrest Jr., Clayton McKinnon	
M A Y	10	Nunzio	Universal Pictures	Paul Williams (director); James Andronica (screenplay); David Proval, James Andronica, Morgana King, Joe Spinell, Tovah Feldshuh, Theresa Saldana, Glenn Scarpelli, Tom Quinn, Maria Smith, Vincent Russo, Jaime Alba, Tony Panetta, Steve Gucciardo, Sonia Zomina, Crystal Hayden, Vincent Igneri	
M A Y	10	Our Winning Season	American International Pictures	Joseph Ruben (director); Nicholas Niciphor (screenplay); Scott Jacoby, Dennis Quaid, Joe Penny, Jan Smithers, P.J. Soles, Joanna Cassidy, J. Don Ferguson, Ted Henning, Deborah Benson, Robert Wahler, Randy Hermann, Wendy Rastattar, Damon Douglas, Jeff Soracco	
M A Y	12	The Greek Tycoon	Universal Pictures / ABKCO Films	J. Lee Thompson (director); Morton S. Fine (screenplay); Anthony Quinn, Jacqueline Bisset, Raf Vallone, Edward Albert, Charles Durning, Luciana Paluzzi, Camilla Sparv, Marilù Tolo, James Franciscus, Roland Culver, Robin Clarke	
M A Y	18	The Buddy Holly Story	Columbia Pictures	Steve Rash (director); Robert Gittler (screenplay); Gary Busey, Don Stroud, Charles Martin Smith, Conrad Janis, William Jordan, Maria Richwine, Amy Johnston, Dick O'Neill, Fred Travalena, Neva Patterson, Arch Johnson, Gailard Sartain, Albert Popwell, Paul Mooney, Stymie Beard, John Goff, Gloria Irizarry, Jody Berry, Richard Kennedy, Jim Beach, Freeman King, Craig White, Jerry Zaremba, Gilbert Melgar	
M A Y	19	The Sea Gypsies	Warner Bros.	Stewart Raffill (director/screenplay); Robert Logan, Mikki Jamison, Heather Rattray, Shannon Saylor, Cjon Damitri Patterson, Mark Litke, Nancy Loomis	
M A Y	19	Thank God It's Friday	Columbia Pictures / Casablanca Filmworks / Motown Productions	Robert Klane (director); Armyan Bernstein (screenplay); Jeff Goldblum, Debra Winger, Donna Summer, DeWayne Jessie, Ray Vitte, Valerie Landsburg, Terri Nunn, Paul Jabara, John Friedrich, Andrea Howard, Marya Small, Chick Vennera, Mark Lonow, Robin Menken, Chuck Sacci, Hilary Beane	
M A Y	20	In Search of Anna		Esben Storm (director/screenplay); Richard Moir, Judy Morris, Chris Haywood, Bill Hunter, Gary Waddell, Alex Taifer, Ian Nimmo, Richard Murphett	
M A Y	23	Harper Valley PTA	April Fools Productions	Richard Bennett (director); George Edwards, Barry Schneider (screenplay); Barbara Eden, Ronny Cox, Nanette Fabray, Louis Nye, Susan Swift, Pat Paulsen, John Fiedler, Ron Masak, Clint Howard, Amzie Strickland, Bob Hastings, Audrey Christie, Molly Dodd, Irene Yah-Ling Sun, Royce D. Applegate, Woody Harrelson, Fay DeWitt, DeVera Marcus, Louise Foley, Brian Cook, Laura Teige, Jan Teige, Tobias Anderson, J.J. Barry, Pitt Herbert, Arlen Stuart	
M A Y	24	If Ever I See You Again	Columbia Pictures	Joe Brooks (director/screenplay); Martin Davidson (screenplay); Joe Brooks, Shelley Hack, Jimmy Breslin, Jerry Keller, George Plimpton, Shannon Bolin, Danielle Brisebois, Branch Emerson, Peter Billingsley, Kenny Karen, Caroline Mignini	
M A Y	24	Youngblood	American International Pictures	Noel Nosseck (director); Paul Carter Harrison (screenplay); Lawrence Hilton-Jacobs, Ren Woods, Art Evans, Sheila Wills, Ralph Farquhar, Lionel Mark Smith, T.K. Carter, Earl Billings, John Herzfeld, Bryan O'Dell, Vince Cannon, David Pendleton, Ron Trice, Herb Rice, Maurice Sneed, Ann Weldon	
M A Y	26	American Graffiti (re-issue)	Universal Pictures / Lucasfilm Ltd. / The Coppola Company	George Lucas (director/screenplay); Gloria Katz, Willard Huyck (screenplay); Richard Dreyfuss, Ron Howard, Paul Le Mat, Charles Martin Smith, Candy Clark, Mackenzie Phillips, Cindy Williams, Wolfman Jack, Bo Hopkins, Manuel Padilla Jr., Harrison Ford, Lynne Marie Stewart, Terry McGovern, Kathleen Quinlan, Scott Beach, Susan Richardson, Kay Ann Kemper, Joe Spano, Debralee Scott, Suzanne Somers	
M A Y	26	Big Wednesday	Warner Bros. / A-Team Productions	John Milius (director/screenplay); Dennis Aaberg (screenplay); Jan-Michael Vincent, William Katt, Gary Busey, Patti D'Arbanville, Lee Purcell, Sam Melville, Darrell Fetty, Robert Englund, Barbara Hale, Fran Ryan, Reb Brown, Joe Spinell, Gerry Lopez	
M A Y	26	Here Come the Tigers	American International Pictures / Sean S. Cunningham Films	Sean S. Cunningham (director); Arch McCoy (screenplay); Richard Lincoln, James Zvanut, Samantha Grey, Manny Lieberman, William Caldwell, Fred Lincoln, Xavier Rodrigo, Sean P. Griffin	
M A Y	26	High-Ballin'	American International Pictures / Jon Slan Productions Inc. / Pando Company / Stanley Chase Productions	Peter Carter (director); Richard Robinson, Stephen Schneck (screenplay); Peter Fonda, Jerry Reed, Helen Shaver, Chris Wiggins, David Ferry, Harvey Atkin, Michael Hogan, Michael Ironside, Myrna Lorrie, Prairie Oyster	
J U N E	2	The Bad News Bears Go to Japan	Paramount Pictures	John Berry (director); Bill Lancaster (screenplay); Tony Curtis, Jackie Earle Haley, Tomisaburo Wakayama, Antonio Inoki, George Wyner, Lonny Chapman, Brett Marx, David Pollock, Regis Philbin, Hatsune Ishihara, Matthew Douglas Anton, Erin Blunt, George Gonzales, Jeffrey Louis Starr	
J U N E	2	Capricorn One	Warner Bros. / ITC Entertainment	Peter Hyams (director/screenplay); Elliott Gould, James Brolin, Brenda Vaccaro, Sam Waterston, O. J. Simpson, Hal Holbrook, David Huddleston, David Doyle, Karen Black, Telly Savalas, Lee Bryant, Denise Nicholas, Robert Walden, Alan Fudge	
J U N E	2	Corvette Summer	United Artists / Plotto Productions	Matthew Robbins (director/screenplay); Hal Barwood (screenplay); Mark Hamill, Annie Potts, Eugene Roche, William Bryant, Richard McKenzie, Kim Milford, Philip Bruns, Danny Bonaduce, Stanley Kamel, Brion James, Dick Miller, Jonathan Terry, Wendie Jo Sperber, Jane A. Johnston, Albert Insinnia, Jason Ronard, John Miller, Isaac Ruiz	
J U N E	6	Damien - Omen II	20th Century Fox / Mace Neufeld Productions	Don Taylor (director); Stanley Mann, Mike Hodges (screenplay); William Holden, Lee Grant, Robert Foxworth, Lew Ayres, Sylvia Sidney, Jonathan Scott-Taylor, Nicholas Pryor, Lance Henriksen, Elizabeth Shepherd, Lucas Donat, Allan Arbus, Meshach Taylor, Leo McKern, Ian Hendry, Fritz Ford, Owen Sullivan, Corney Morgan	
J U N E	9	The Cat from Outer Space	Walt Disney Productions / Buena Vista Distribution	Norman Tokar (director); Ted Key (screenplay); Ken Berry, Sandy Duncan, Harry Morgan, Ronnie Schell, Roddy McDowall, McLean Stevenson, Jesse White, Alan Young, Hans Conried, James Hampton, Howard Platt, William Prince, Ralph Manza, Tom Pedi, Hank Jones, Rick Hurst, Sorrell Booke, John Alderson, Mel Carter, Dallas McKennon, Alice Backes, Henry Slate, Roger Price, Jerry Fujikawa, Peter Renaday, Rickie Sorensen, Gil Stratton, Fred Whalen, Tiger Joe Marsh, Roger Pancake, Rumpler and Amber	
J U N E	9	The Jungle Book (re-issue)	Walt Disney Productions / Buena Vista Distribution	Wolfgang Reitherman (director); Larry Clemmons, Ralph Wright, Ken Anderson, Vance Gerry (screenplay); Phil Harris, Sebastian Cabot, George Sanders, Sterling Holloway, John Abbott, Louis Prima, Bruce Reitherman, J. Pat O'Malley, Verna Felton, Clint Howard, Chad Stuart, Lord Tim Hudson, Ben Wright, Darlene Carr, Leo De Lyon, Hal Smith, Ralph Wright, Digby Wolfe, Bill Skiles, Pete Henderson, Candy Candido	
J U N E	10	The Driver	20th Century Fox / EMI Films	Walter Hill (director/screenplay); Ryan O'Neal, Bruce Dern, Isabelle Adjani, Ronee Blakley, Matt Clark, Felice Orlandi, Rudy Ramos, Nick Dimitri, Bob Minor, Joseph Walsh, Denny Macko, Frank Bruno, Will Walker, Sandy Brown Wyeth, Tara King, Richard Carey, Fidel Corona, Victor Gilmour	
J U N E	14	Go Tell the Spartans	AVCO Embassy Pictures / MarVista Entertainment / Spartan Productions	Ted Post (director); Wendell Mayes (screenplay); Burt Lancaster, Craig Wasson, Marc Singer, Jonathan Goldsmith, Joe Unger, David Clennon, Evan C. Kim, John Megna, Hilly Hicks, Dolph Sweet, Clyde Kusatsu, James Hong, Tad Horino, Dennis Howard, Denice Kumagai, Phong Diep, Ralph Brannen, Mark Carlton	
J U N E	16	The Comeback	Lone Star Pictures	Pete Walker (director); Michael Sloan, Murray Smith (screenplay); Jack Jones, Pamela Stephenson, David Doyle, Bill Owen, Sheila Keith, Richard Johnson, Patrick Brock, Holly Palance, June Chadwick, Penny Irving, Peter Turner, David Hamilton	
J U N E	16	Grease	Paramount Pictures	Randal Kleiser (director); Bronte Woodard (screenplay); John Travolta, Olivia Newton-John, Stockard Channing, Jeff Conaway, Barry Pearl, Michael Tucci, Kelly Ward, Didi Conn, Jamie Donnelly, Dinah Manoff, Eve Arden, Dody Goodman, Sid Caesar, Eddie Deezen, Susan Buckner, Lorenzo Lamas, Dennis C. Stewart, Annette Charles, Joan Blondell, Ellen Travolta, Frankie Avalon, Edd Byrnes, Sha-Na-Na, Alice Ghostley, Darrell Zwerling, Dick Patterson, Fannie Flagg	
J U N E	16	Jaws 2	Universal Pictures / Zanuck/Brown Company	Jeannot Szwarc (director); Carl Gottlieb, Howard Sackler (screenplay); Roy Scheider, Lorraine Gary, Murray Hamilton, Joe Mascolo, Jeffrey Kramer, Collin Wilcox, Ann Dusenberry, Mark Gruner, Susan French, Barry Coe, Donna Wilkes, Gary Dubin, John Dukakis, Marc Gilpin, Keith Gordon, Cynthia Grover, Billy Van Zandt, Gigi Vorgan, Fritzi Jane Courtney, Gary Springer, G. Thomas Dunlop, David Elliott, Ben Marley, Martha Swatek, Alfred Wilde, Cyprian R. Dube, Jean Coulter, Christine Freeman, Herb Muller, David Owsley, Susan Owsley McMillan	
J U N E	16	The Shout	Rank Film Distributors / Recorded Picture Company	Jerzy Skolimowski (director/screenplay); Michael Austin (screenplay); Alan Bates, Susannah York, John Hurt, Robert Stephens, Tim Curry, Julian Hough, Carol Drinkwater, Susan Wooldridge, Jim Broadbent	
J U N E	21	The Chant of Jimmie Blacksmith	Hoyts Theatres / The Film House / The Australian Film Commission / The Victorian Film Corporation	Fred Schepisi (director/screenplay); Tom E. Lewis, Freddy Reynolds, Ray Barrett, Jack Thompson, Angela Punch McGregor, Steve Dodd, Peter Carroll, Ruth Cracknell, Don Crosby, Elizabeth Alexander, Peter Sumner, Tim Robertson, Ray Meagher, Brian Anderson, Jane Harders	
J U N E	21	Good Guys Wear Black	American Cinema Releasing / Action One Film Partners, LTD / MarVista Productions / Western Film Productions	Ted Post (director); Bruce Cohn, Mark Medoff (screenplay); Chuck Norris, Anne Archer, Soon-Tek Oh, Dana Andrews, James Franciscus, Lloyd Haynes, Jim Backus, Lawrence P. Casey, Jerry Douglas, Stack Pierce, Aaron Norris, James Bacon, Viola Harris, Pat E. Johnson, Anthony Mannino, Joe Bennett, Michael Payne, David Starwalt, Don Pike, Benjamin J. Perry, Kathy McCullen, Michael Stark, Virginia Wing, Warren Smith	
J U N E	21	The Great Smokey Roadblock	Dimension Pictures / MarVista	John Leone (director/screenplay); Henry Fonda, Eileen Brennan, John Byner, Dub Taylor, Daina House, Austin Pendleton, Robert Englund, Susan Sarandon, Melanie Mayron, Leigh French, Mews Small, Gary Sandy, Valerie Curtin, Johnnie Collins III, Bibi Osterwald	
J U N E	23	The Cheap Detective	Columbia Pictures / EMI Films / Rastar	Robert Moore (director); Neil Simon (screenplay); Peter Falk, Madeline Kahn, Dom DeLuise, Louise Fletcher, Ann-Margret, Eileen Brennan, Stockard Channing, Sid Caesar, Marsha Mason, John Houseman, Vic Tayback, Abe Vigoda, Carmine Caridi, James Coco, Phil Silvers, Fernando Lamas, Nicol Williamson, James Cromwell, Scatman Crothers, Paul Williams, David Ogden Stiers, John Calvin	
J U N E	23	Matilda	American International Pictures	Daniel Mann (director); Timothy Galfas (screenplay); Elliott Gould, Clive Revill, Harry Guardino, Roy Clark, Karen Carlson, Art Metrano, Lionel Stander, Roberta Collins, Larry Pennell, Gary Morgan, Robert Mitchum, Lenny Montana, Frank Avianca, Joe De Fish, Pat Henry	
J U N E	23	Zero to Sixty	Warner Bros. / First Artists / Grandmet Productions	Don Weis (director); Judith Bustany, Darren McGavin, W. Lyle Richardson, Peg Shirley (screenplay); Darren McGavin, Sylvia Miles, Joan Collins, Denise Nickerson, Dick Martin, Bill Hudson, Brett Hudson, Mark Hudson, Vito Scotti, Lorraine Gary, David Huddleston, Gordon MacRae, Lyle Waggoner	
J U N E	28	Convoy	United Artists / EMI Films	Sam Peckinpah (director); B.W.L. Norton (screenplay); Kris Kristofferson, Ali MacGraw, Burt Young, Ernest Borgnine, Madge Sinclair, Franklin Ajaye, Seymour Cassel, Cassie Yates, Billy Hughes, Patrice Martinez, Donnie Fritts, Tommy Bush, Spec O'Donnell, Brian Davies, Walter Kelley, Jorge Russek	
J U N E	28	Heaven Can Wait	Paramount Pictures	Warren Beatty (director/screenplay); Buck Henry (director); Elaine May (screenplay); Warren Beatty, Julie Christie, James Mason, Charles Grodin, Dyan Cannon, Buck Henry, Vincent Gardenia, Jack Warden, Joseph Maher, Hamilton Camp, Arthur Malet, Stephanie Faracy, Jeannie Linero, Larry Block, Frank Campanella, Dick Enberg, Dolph Sweet, R.G. Armstrong, Ed V. Peck, John Randolph, Will Hare, Lee Weaver, Roger Bowen, Keene Curtis, Morgan Farley, William Bogert, Peter Tomarken, William Sylvester, Jerry Scanlan, Jim Boeke, Les Josephson, Jack T. Snow, Curt Gowdy, Al DeRogatis, Deacon Jones, Charley Cowan	
J U N E	28	The Wild Geese	Allied Artists / Richmond Film Productions (West) Ltd / Varius Entertainment Trading A.G.	Andrew V. McLaglen (director); Reginald Rose (screenplay); Richard Burton, Roger Moore, Richard Harris, Hardy Krüger, Stewart Granger, Jack Watson, Frank Finlay, Kenneth Griffith, Jeff Corey, Barry Foster, Winston Ntshona, Ronald Fraser, John Kani, David Ladd, Ian Yule, Patrick Allen, Brook Williams, Percy Herbert, Jane Hylton, Paul Spurrier, Patrick Holt	
J U N E	29	Fedora	United Artists / Lorimar / Geria Film / Bavaria Atelier GmbH / Société Française de Production	Billy Wilder (director/screenplay); I.A.L. Diamond (screenplay); William Holden, Marthe Keller, Hildegard Knef, José Ferrer, Frances Sternhagen, Stephen Collins, Gottfried John, Arlene Francis, Mario Adorf, Michael York, Henry Fonda	
J U N E	30	The Seniors	Cinema Shares International Distribution / Senior Pictures Inc.	Rod Amateau (director); Stanley Shapiro (screenplay); Gary Imhoff, Jeffrey Byron, Dennis Quaid, Lou Richards, Rocky Flintermann, Priscilla Barnes, Alan Reed	

== July–September ==
Opening		Title	Production company	Cast and crew	Ref.
J U L Y	5	Hot Lead and Cold Feet	Walt Disney Productions / Buena Vista Distribution	Robert Butler (director); Joe McEveety, Arthur Alsberg, Don Nelson (screenplay); Jim Dale, Karen Valentine, Don Knotts, Darren McGavin, Jack Elam, Dallas McKennon, John Williams, Warren Vanders, Michael Sharrett, Don "Red" Barry, Gregg Palmer, Ed Bakey, John Steadman, Eric Server, Paul Lukather, Stanley Clements, Don Brodie, Jack Bender, Debbie Lytton, David Cass, Richard Wright, Jimmy Van Patten, James Michaelford	
J U L Y	5	Stunt Rock	Film Ventures International / Intertamar / Trenchard Productions	Brian Trenchard-Smith (director/screenplay); Paul-Michel Mielche Jr. (screenplay); Grant Page, Monique van de Ven, Sorcery, Phil Hartman, Margaret Trenchard-Smith, Richard Blackburn, Ron Raley, Chris Chalen, Barbra Paskin, Yana Nirvana	
J U L Y	14	Foul Play	Paramount Pictures	Colin Higgins (director/screenplay); Goldie Hawn, Chevy Chase, Burgess Meredith, Brian Dennehy, Dudley Moore, Rachel Roberts, Eugene Roche, William Frankfather, Marc Lawrence, Marilyn Sokol, Billy Barty, Bruce Solomon, Don Calfa, Cyril Magnin, Chuck McCann, Thomas Jamerson	
J U L Y	14	Hooper	Warner Bros.	Hal Needham (director); Thomas Rickman, Bill Kerby (screenplay); Burt Reynolds, Jan-Michael Vincent, Sally Field, Brian Keith, Robert Klein, John Marley, James Best, Alfie Wise, Adam West, Terry Bradshaw	
J U L Y	14	Mouth to Mouth	Umbrella Entertainment	John Duigan (director/screenplay); Kim Krejus, Sonia Peat, Ian Gilmour, Serge Frazzetto, Walter Pym	
J U L Y	14	The Swarm	Warner Bros.	Irwin Allen (director); Stirling Silliphant (screenplay); Michael Caine, Katharine Ross, Richard Widmark, Richard Chamberlain, Olivia de Havilland, Ben Johnson, Lee Grant, José Ferrer, Patty Duke, Slim Pickens, Bradford Dillman, Fred MacMurray, Henry Fonda, Cameron Mitchell, Christian Juttner, Morgan Paull, Alejandro Rey, Don "Red" Barry	
J U L Y	19	Revenge of the Pink Panther	United Artists / Sellers-Edwards Productions / Jewel Productions / Pimlico Films	Blake Edwards (director/screenplay); Frank Waldman, Ron Clark (screenplay); Peter Sellers, Herbert Lom, Robert Webber, Dyan Cannon, Burt Kwouk, Tony Beckley, Robert Loggia, Paul Stewart, André Maranne, Graham Stark, Alfie Bass, Sue Lloyd, Douglas Wilmer, Ferdy Mayne, Valerie Leon, Ed Parker, Adrienne Corri, Henry McGee, Andrew Sachs, Julian Orchard, John Bluthal, Rita Webb, Ragbir Sraan	
J U L Y	19	International Velvet	United Artists	Bryan Forbes (director/screenplay); Tatum O'Neal, Christopher Plummer, Anthony Hopkins, Nanette Newman, Peter Barkworth, Dinsdale Landen, Jeffrey Byron, Richard Warwick, Daniel Abineri, Norman Wooland, Susan Jameson, Brenda Cowling, David Tate, Sarah Bullen, Jason White, Martin Neil, Douglas Reith, Dennis Blanch	
J U L Y	21	The Hound of the Baskervilles	Atlantic Releasing Corporation	Paul Morrissey (director/screenplay); Peter Cook, Dudley Moore (screenplay); Peter Cook, Dudley Moore, Denholm Elliott, Joan Greenwood, Hugh Griffith, Irene Handl, Terry-Thomas, Max Wall, Kenneth Williams, Roy Kinnear, Dana Gillespie, Lucy Griffiths, Penelope Keith, Jessie Matthews, Prunella Scales, Josephine Tewson, Rita Webb, Henry Woolf, Spike Milligan	
J U L Y	21	Sgt. Pepper's Lonely Hearts Club Band	Universal Pictures / Robert Stigwood Organization	Michael Schultz (director); Henry Edwards (screenplay); Peter Frampton, The Bee Gees, Frankie Howerd, Paul Nicholas, Donald Pleasence, Sandy Farina, Dianne Steinberg, Steve Martin, Aerosmith, Alice Cooper, Earth, Wind & Fire, Billy Preston, George Burns, Stargard, Carel Struycken, Max Showalter, Patrick Cranshaw, Peter Allen, Keith Allison, George Benson, Elvin Bishop, Stephen Bishop, Jack Bruce, Keith Carradine, Carol Channing, Harlettes, Jim Dandy, Sarah Dash, Rick Derringer, Barbara Dickson, Donovan, Dr. John, Randy Edelman, Yvonne Elliman, José Feliciano, Leif Garrett, Adrian Gurvitz, Billy Harper, Eddie Harris, Heart, Nona Hendryx, Dame Edna Everage, Etta James, Bruce Johnston, Joe Lala, D.C. LaRue, Jo Leb, Marcy Levy, Mark Lindsay, Nils Lofgren, John Mayall, Curtis Mayfield, "Cousin Brucie" Morrow, Peter Noone, Alan O'Day, Lee Oskar, The Paley Brothers, Robert Palmer, Wilson Pickett, Anita Pointer, Bonnie Raitt, Helen Reddy, Minnie Riperton, Chita Rivera, Johnny Rivers, Monte Rock III, Danielle Rowe, Seals & Crofts, Sha-Na-Na, Del Shannon, Joe Simon, Connie Stevens, Al Stewart, John Stewart, Tina Turner, Frankie Valli, Gwen Verdon, Diane Vincent, Grover Washington Jr., Alan White, Lenny White, Jackie Lomax, Margaret Whiting, Hank Williams Jr., Johnny Winter, Wolfman Jack, Bobby Womack, Gary Wright	
J U L Y	21	Star Wars (re-issue)	20th Century Fox / Lucasfilm	George Lucas (director/screenplay); Mark Hamill, Harrison Ford, Carrie Fisher, Peter Cushing, Alec Guinness, Anthony Daniels, Kenny Baker, Peter Mayhew, James Earl Jones, David Prowse, Phil Brown, Shelagh Fraser, Jack Purvis, Eddie Byrne, Denis Lawson, Garrick Hagon, Don Henderson, Leslie Schofield, Richard LeParmentier, Alex McCrindle, Alfie Curtis, Peter Geddis, Michael Leader, Robert Clarke, Patrick Jordan, Drewe Henley, Jack Klaff, William Hootkins, Angus MacInnes, Jeremy Sinden, Scott Beach, Steve Gawley, Joe Johnston, Grant McCune, Peter Sumner, Malcolm Tierney, Phil Tippett	
J U L Y	25	Circle of Iron	AVCO Embassy Pictures	Richard Moore (director); Stirling Silliphant, Stanley Mann (screenplay); David Carradine, Christopher Lee, Roddy McDowall, Eli Wallach, Anthony De Longis, Earl Maynard, Jeff Cooper, Erica Creer	
J U L Y	28	National Lampoon's Animal House	Universal Pictures	John Landis (director); Harold Ramis, Douglas Kenney, Chris Miller (screenplay); John Belushi, Tim Matheson, Peter Riegert, Tom Hulce, Stephen Furst, Bruce McGill, James Widdoes, Karen Allen, James Daughton, Mark Metcalf, Kevin Bacon, Mary Louise Weller, Martha Smith, John Vernon, Verna Bloom, Donald Sutherland, Cesare Danova, Sarah Holcomb, DeWayne Jessie, Douglas Kenney, Chris Miller	
J U L Y	29	Newsfront	Roadshow Entertainment	Phillip Noyce (director/screenplay); Bob Ellis (screenplay); Bill Hunter, Wendy Hughes, Bryan Brown, Gerard Kennedy, Chris Haywood, John Ewart, John Clayton, Angela Punch McGregor, Don Crosby, Mark Holden, Drew Forsythe, Ray Meagher, Bruce Spence, Brian Blain, Jude Kuring, John Flaus, Tony Barry, Gerry Duggan	
A U G U S T	2	Eyes of Laura Mars	Columbia Pictures	Irvin Kershner (director); John Carpenter, David Zelag Goodman (screenplay); Faye Dunaway, Tommy Lee Jones, Brad Dourif, René Auberjonois, Raúl Juliá, Frank Adonis, Lisa Taylor, Darlanne Fluegel, Rose Gregorio, Bill Boggs, Meg Mundy, John Sahag, Steve Marachuk, Marilyn Meyers	
A U G U S T	2	Interiors	United Artists	Woody Allen (director/screenplay); Kristin Griffith, Mary Beth Hurt, Richard Jordan, Diane Keaton, E.G. Marshall, Geraldine Page, Maureen Stapleton, Sam Waterston, Henderson Forsythe	
A U G U S T	2	The Magic of Lassie	International Picture Show Company / Lassie Productions	Don Chaffey (director); Jean Holloway, Robert B. Sherman, Richard M. Sherman (screenplay); James Stewart, Stephanie Zimbalist, Pernell Roberts, Michael Sharrett, Mickey Rooney, Alice Faye, Gene Evans, Mike Mazurki, Lane Davies, James V. Reynolds, Rayford Barnes, Buck Young, Robert Lussier, Bob Cashell, Carl Nielsen	
A U G U S T	3	Piranha	New World Pictures / Piranha Productions	Joe Dante (director); John Sayles (screenplay); Bradford Dillman, Heather Menzies, Kevin McCarthy, Keenan Wynn, Dick Miller, Barbara Steele, Belinda Balaski, Melody Thomas Scott, Bruce Gordon, Barry Brown, Paul Bartel, Richard Deacon, John Sayles, Shannon Collins, Shawn Nelson	
A U G U S T	4	China 9, Liberty 37	Fida International Films / Compagnia Europea Cinematografica / Aspa Producciones	Monte Hellman (director); Jerry Harvey, Douglas Venturelli, Ennio De Concini, Don Vicente Escrivá (screenplay); Fabio Testi, Warren Oates, Jenny Agutter, Sam Peckinpah, Franco Interlenghi, Sydney Lassick, Richard C. Adams, Romano Puppo, Luis Prendes, Helga Liné, Jose Murillo, Luis Barboo, Isabel Mestres, Gianrico Tondinelli, Charly Bravo, Paco Benlloch, Natalie Kim, Mattieu Ettori, David Thomson, Daniel Panes, Piero Fondi, Tony Brandt, Frank Clement, Freda Lorente	
A U G U S T	11	Girlfriends	Warner Bros. / Cyclops Films	Claudia Weill (director); Vicki Polon (screenplay); Melanie Mayron, Anita Skinner, Eli Wallach, Christopher Guest, Bob Balaban, Amy Wright, Viveca Lindfors, Mike Kellin, Roderick Cook, Kathryn Walker, Kristoffer Tabori, Jane Anderson, Tanya Berezin, Kenneth McMillan, Gina Rogak, Jean De Baer, Nancy Mette, Stacey Lomoe-Smith, Norma Mayron	
A U G U S T	11	Who'll Stop the Rain	United Artists / Katzka-Jaffe	Karel Reisz (director); Judith Rascoe, Robert Stone (screenplay); Nick Nolte, Tuesday Weld, Michael Moriarty, Anthony Zerbe, Richard Masur, Ray Sharkey, Gail Strickland, Charles Haid, David Opatoshu, Joaquín Martínez, James Cranna, Timothy Blake, Shelby Balik, Jean Howell, José Carlos Ruiz	
A U G U S T	18	Absolution	Trans World Entertainment	Anthony Page (director); Anthony Shaffer (screenplay); Richard Burton, Dominic Guard, Dai Bradley, Billy Connolly, Andrew Keir, Willoughby Gray, Preston Lockwood, James Ottaway, Brook Williams, Jon Plowman, Robin Soans, Trevor Martin, Sharon Duce, Brian Glover	
A U G U S T	18	Debbie Does Dallas	VCX / School Day Films	Jim Clark (director); Maria Minestra (screenplay); Bambi Woods, Richard Balla, Robin Byrd, Eric Edwards, Bill Barry, Christie Ford, Rikki O'Neal, Jenny Cole, David Pierce, Merle Michaels, Jack Teague, Georgette Sanders, Peter Lerman, Ben Pierce, Arcadia Lake, Tony Mansfield, David Morris, Kasey Rodgers	
A U G U S T	25	Olly Olly Oxen Free	Sanrio Communications / Rico Lion	Richard A. Colla (director); Eugene Poinc (screenplay); Katharine Hepburn, Joseph McBride, Kevin McKenzie, Dennis Dimster, Peter Kilman, Jayne Marie Mansfield	
A U G U S T	29	A Wedding	20th Century Fox / Lion's Gate Films, Inc.	Robert Altman (director/screenplay); John Considine, Allan F. Nicholls, Patricia Resnick (screenplay); Desi Arnaz Jr., Carol Burnett, Geraldine Chaplin, Howard Duff, Mia Farrow, Lillian Gish, Paul Dooley, Dennis Christopher, Peggy Ann Garner, Mark Deming, Tim Thomerson, Marta Heflin, Margaret Ladd, Nina Van Pallandt, Vittorio Gassman, Belita Moreno, Luigi "Gigi" Proietti, Virginia Vestoff, Dina Merrill, Pat McCormack, Ruth Nelson, Craig Richard Nelson, Jeff Perry, Viveca Lindfors, John Cromwell, Lauren Hutton, Allan F. Nicholls, John Considine, Dennis Franz, Pam Dawber, Gavan O'Herlihy, Robert Fortier, Bert Remsen, John Malkovich, Gary Sinise, Laurie Metcalf, Alan Wilder, George Wendt, Amy Stryker, Gerald Busby, Lesley Rogers, Mary Seibel, Ann Ryerson, Cedric Scott, Beverly Ross	
A U G U S T	30	Avalanche	New World Pictures	Corey Allen (director/screenplay); Claude Pola (screenplay); Rock Hudson, Robert Forster, Mia Farrow, Jeanette Nolan, Rick Moses, Steve Franken, Barry Primus, Cathey Paine, Jerry Douglas, Antony Carbone, X Brands	
S E P T E M B E R	13	Days of Heaven	Paramount Pictures	Terrence Malick (director/screenplay); Richard Gere, Brooke Adams, Sam Shepard, Linda Manz, Robert Wilke, Stuart Margolin, Tim Scott, Doug Kershaw, Richard Libertini	
S E P T E M B E R	13	The Odd Job	Columbia-EMI-Warner / Charisma Films	Peter Medak (director); Graham Chapman, Bernard McKenna (screenplay); Graham Chapman, David Jason, Diana Quick, Simon Williams, Edward Hardwicke, Bill Paterson, Michael Elphick, Carolyn Seymour, Joe Melia, George Innes, James Bree, Richard O'Brien, Carl Andrews, Dave Atkins, Stewart Harwood, Zulema Dene	
S E P T E M B E R	14	Stay as You Are	Columbia Pictures	Alberto Lattuada (director/screenplay); Enrico Oldoini (screenplay); Marcello Mastroianni, Nastassja Kinski, Barbara De Rossi, Ania Pieroni, Francisco Rabal, Mónica Randall, José María Caffarel, Giuliana Calandra, Massimo Bonetti, Maria Pia Attanasio, Raimondo Penne, Claudio Aliotti, Mario Cecchi, Adriana Falco, Rodolfo Bigotti	
S E P T E M B E R	15	Up in Smoke	Paramount Pictures	Lou Adler (director); Tommy Chong, Cheech Marin (screenplay); Cheech Marin, Tommy Chong, Strother Martin, Edie Adams, Stacy Keach, Mills Watson, Zane Buzby, Tom Skerritt, June Fairchild, Rainbeaux Smith, Otto Felix, Louisa Moritz, David Nelson, Rodney Bingenheimer, Ellen Barkin, Harry Dean Stanton, Gary Mule Deer, Wally Ann Wharton (as Anne Wharton, born Anne Marie Wharton), Angelina Estrada, Corey Fortenberry, Ruth Hernandez	
S E P T E M B E R	22	Almost Summer	Universal Pictures	Martin Davidson (director/screenplay); Judith Berg, Sandra Berg, Marc Reid Rubel (screenplay); Bruno Kirby, Lee Purcell, John Friedrich, Didi Conn, Thomas Carter, Tim Matheson, Michael Stearns, Sherry Hursey, Gene LeBell, Donna Wilkes, Byron Stewart, Harvey Lewis, Allen G. Norman, Petronia Paley, David Wilson, Robert Resnick	
S E P T E M B E R	29	Born Again	AVCO Embassy Pictures	Irving Rapper (director); Walter Bloch (screenplay); Dean Jones, Anne Francis, Jay Robinson, Dana Andrews, Raymond St. Jacques, George Brent, Harold Hughes, Billy Graham, Robert Gray, Peter Jurasik, Robert Broyles, Harry Spillman, Scott Walker, Arthur Roberts, Ned Wilson, Dean Brooks, Christopher Conrad, Stuart Lee, Richard Caine, Brigid O'Brien, Anthony Canne, Corinne Michaels	
S E P T E M B E R	29	Death on the Nile	EMI Films / Mersham Productions	John Guillermin (director); Anthony Shaffer (screenplay); Peter Ustinov, Jane Birkin, Lois Chiles, Bette Davis, Mia Farrow, Jon Finch, Olivia Hussey, George Kennedy, Angela Lansbury, Simon MacCorkindale, David Niven, Maggie Smith, Jack Warden, I. S. Johar, Harry Andrews, Sam Wanamaker, Celia Imrie, Saeed Jaffrey	
S E P T E M B E R	29	The Legacy	Universal Pictures	Richard Marquand (director); Jimmy Sangster, Patrick Tilley, Paul Wheeler (screenplay); Katharine Ross, Sam Elliott, Roger Daltrey, John Standing, Ian Hogg, Margaret Tyzack, Charles Gray, Lee Montague, Hildegard Neil, Marianne Broome	
S E P T E M B E R	29	Somebody Killed Her Husband	Columbia Pictures / Melvin Simon Productions	Lamont Johnson (director); Reginald Rose (screenplay); Farrah Fawcett-Majors, Jeff Bridges, John Wood, Tammy Grimes, John Glover, Patricia Elliott, Mary McCarty, Laurence Guittard, Eddie Lawrence, Sands Hall, Vincent Robert Santa Lucia, Beeson Carroll	
S E P T E M B E R	29	Two Solitudes	Compass Films	Lionel Chetwynd (director/screenplay); Jean-Pierre Aumont, Stacy Keach, Gloria Carlin, Chris Wiggins, Claude Jutra, Raymond Cloutier, Jean-Louis Roux, John Boylan, Louis Negin, Murray Westgate	

== October–December ==
Opening		Title	Production company	Cast and crew	Ref.
O C T O B E R	1	Patrick	Filmways Australasian Distributors / Australian International Film Corporation / Australian Film Commission / Victorian Film Corporation	Richard Franklin (director); Everett De Roche (screenplay); Susan Penhaligon, Robert Helpmann, Rod Mullinar, Bruce Barry, Julia Blake, Helen Hemingway, María Mercedes, Walter Pym, Robert Thompson, Helen Hemingway, Frank Wilson, John P. Boddie	
O C T O B E R	1	Remember My Name	Columbia Pictures	Alan Rudolph (director/screenplay); Geraldine Chaplin, Anthony Perkins, Moses Gunn, Jeff Goldblum, Berry Berenson, Timothy Thomerson, Alfre Woodard, Marilyn Coleman, Jeffrey S. Perry, Alan Autry, Dennis Franz	
O C T O B E R	5	The Boys from Brazil	20th Century Fox / ITC Entertainment / Producer Circle	Franklin J. Schaffner (director); Heywood Gould (screenplay); Gregory Peck, Laurence Olivier, James Mason, Lilli Palmer, Uta Hagen, Steve Guttenberg, Denholm Elliott, Rosemary Harris, John Dehner, John Rubinstein, Anne Meara, Jeremy Black, Bruno Ganz, Walter Gotell, David Hurst, Wolfgang Preiss, Michael Gough, Joachim Hansen, Sky du Mont, Carl Duering, Linda Hayden, Richard Marner, Georg Marischka, Günter Meisner, Prunella Scales, Raúl Faustino Saldanha, Wolf Kahler	
O C T O B E R	5	Drunken Master	Seasonal Film Corporation	Yuen Woo-ping (director); Siao Lung, Ng See-yuen (screenplay); Jackie Chan, Yuen Siu-tien, Hwang Jang-lee, Dean Shek, Yuen Woo-ping, Lam Kau, Fung King-man, Hsu Hsia, Linda Lin, Yuen Shun-yi, Tong Jing, Tino Wong	
O C T O B E R	5	The Norseman	American International Pictures / Charles B. Pierce Film Productions / Fawcett-Majors Productions	Charles B. Pierce (director/screenplay); Lee Majors, Cornel Wilde, Mel Ferrer, Jack Elam, Susie Coelho, Christopher Connelly, Jimmy Clem, Deacon Jones, Denny Miller, Kathleen Freeman	
O C T O B E R	5	Who Is Killing the Great Chefs of Europe?	Warner Bros. / Lorimar Productions / Aldrich Company / Geria Productions / Bavaria Films	Ted Kotcheff (director); Peter Stone (screenplay); George Segal, Jacqueline Bisset, Robert Morley, Jean-Pierre Cassel, Philippe Noiret, Jean Rochefort, Gigi Proietti, Stefano Satta Flores, Madge Ryan, Frank Windsor, Peter Sallis, Tim Barlow, John Le Mesurier, Joss Ackland, Jean Gaven, Daniel Emilfork, Jacques Marin, Jacques Balutin, Jean Parédès, Michael Chow, Anita Graham, Nicholas Ball, David Cook, Nigel Havers, Caroline Langrishe	
O C T O B E R	6	The Big Fix	Universal Pictures	Jeremy Paul Kagan (director); Roger L. Simon (screenplay); Richard Dreyfuss, Susan Anspach, Bonnie Bedelia, John Lithgow, Ofelia Medina, Nicolas Coster, F. Murray Abraham, Fritz Weaver, Ron Rifkin	
O C T O B E R	6	Bloodbrothers	Warner Bros.	Robert Mulligan (director); Walter Newman (screenplay); Paul Sorvino, Tony Lo Bianco, Richard Gere, Lelia Goldoni, Yvonne Wilder, Marilu Henner, Kenneth McMillan, Floyd Levine, Kim Milford, Kristine DeBell, Robert Englund, Gloria LeRoy, Paulene Myers, Danny Aiello, Bruce French, Peter Iacangelo, Eddie Jones, Randy Jurgensen, Ron McLarty, Robert Costanzo, Kennedy Gordy, Jeffrey Jacquet, Michael Hershewe, Lila Teigh, Damu King, Raymond Singer, E. Brian Dean, David Berman, Edwin Owens, Tom Signorelli	
O C T O B E R	6	Midnight Express	Columbia Pictures / Casablanca FilmWorks	Alan Parker (director); Oliver Stone (screenplay); Brad Davis, Irene Miracle, Bo Hopkins, Paolo Bonacelli, Paul L. Smith, Randy Quaid, Norbert Weisser, John Hurt, Kevork Malikyan, Yashaw Adem, Mike Kellin, Franco Diogene, Michael Ensign, Gigi Ballista, Peter Jeffrey, Michael Giannatos	
O C T O B E R	6	Goin' South	Paramount Pictures	Jack Nicholson (director); John Herman Shaner, Al Ramrus, Charles Shyer, Alan Mandel (screenplay); Jack Nicholson, Mary Steenburgen, Christopher Lloyd, John Belushi, Richard Bradford, Veronica Cartwright, Jeff Morris, Danny DeVito, Tracey Walter, Britt Leach, Luana Anders, Lucy Lee Flippin, Ed Begley Jr., Lin Shaye, Anne Ramsey, Gerald H. Reynolds, George W. Smith	
O C T O B E R	14	Rescue from Gilligan's Island	NBC / Redwood Productions / Sherwood Schwartz Productions	Leslie H. Martinson (director); Sherwood Schwartz, Elroy Schwartz, Al Schwartz, David Harmon (screenplay); Bob Denver, Alan Hale Jr., Jim Backus, Natalie Schafer, Judith Baldwin, Russell Johnson, Dawn Wells, Vincent Schiavelli, Art LaFleur, Norman Bartold, Lewis Arquette, Mario Machado, Barbara Mallory, June Whitley Taylor, Martin Rudy, Mary Gregory, Glenn Robards, Diane Chesney, Victor Rogers, Michael Flanagan	
O C T O B E R	17	Goin' Coconuts	Osmond Entertainment / Inter Planetary Pictures	Howard Morris (director); William Mark Daniels, Raymond Harvey (screenplay); Donny Osmond, Marie Osmond, Herb Edelman, Kenneth Mars, Ted Cassidy, Marc Lawrence, Khigh Dhiegh, Harold Sakata, Jack Collins, Danny Wells, Charles Walker, Tommy Fujiwara	
O C T O B E R	18	Autumn Sonata	Constantin Film / ITC Entertainment	Ingmar Bergman (director/screenplay); Ingrid Bergman, Liv Ullmann, Lena Nyman, Halvar Björk, Marianne Aminoff, Arne Bang-Hansen, Gunnar Björnstrand, Erland Josephson, Georg Løkkeberg, Mimi Pollak, Linn Ullmann	
O C T O B E R	19	Gates of Heaven	New Yorker Films	Errol Morris (director); Floyd McClure, Cal Harberts, Florence Rasmussen	
O C T O B E R	20	Attack of the Killer Tomatoes	NAI Entertainment	John DeBello (director/screenplay); Costa Dillon, Stephen Peace (screenplay); David Miller, George Wilson, Sharon Taylor, Stephen Peace, Costa Dillon, Ernie Meyers, Eric Christmas, Ron Shapiro, Al Sklar, Jerry Anderson, Jack Riley, Gary Smith, John Qualls, Geoff Ramsey, Ryan Shields, Benita Barton, Don Birch, Tom Coleman, Art K. Koustik, Jack Nolen, Paul Oya, Robert Rudd, Byron Teegarden, Michael Seewald, Steve Cates, Dean Grell, Dana Ashbrook	
O C T O B E R	20	Despair	New Line Cinema	Rainer Werner Fassbinder (director); Tom Stoppard (screenplay); Dirk Bogarde, Andréa Ferréol, Klaus Lowitsch, Volker Spengler, Peter Kern, Alexander Allerson, Gottfried John, Hark Bohm, Bernhard Wicki, Adrian Hoven, Roger Fritz, Armin Meier, Ingrid Caven, Y Sa Lo, Voli Geiler	
O C T O B E R	24	The Wiz	Universal Pictures / Motown Productions	Sidney Lumet (director); Joel Schumacher (screenplay); Diana Ross, Michael Jackson, Nipsey Russell, Ted Ross, Richard Pryor, Lena Horne, Mabel King, Thelma Carpenter, Theresa Merritt, Stanley Greene	
O C T O B E R	25	Comes a Horseman	United Artists	Alan J. Pakula (director); Dennis Lynton Clark (screenplay); James Caan, Jane Fonda, Jason Robards, George Grizzard, Richard Farnsworth, Jim Davis, Mark Harmon, Macon McCalman, Basil Hoffman, James Keach, James Kline	
O C T O B E R	25	Halloween	Compass International Pictures	John Carpenter (director/screenplay); Debra Hill (screenplay); Donald Pleasence, Jamie Lee Curtis, P.J. Soles, Nancy Loomis, Charles Cyphers, Kyle Richards, Brian Andrews, Nancy Stephens, Arthur Malet, Adam Hollander, Sandy Johnson, Peter Griffith, Robert Phalen, Nick Castle, John Michael Graham, Mickey Yablans, Brent Le Page, David Kyle	
O C T O B E R	25	Money Movers	Roadshow Entertainment / South Australian Film Corporation	Bruce Beresford (director/screenplay); Terence Donovan, Tony Bonner, Ed Devereaux, Charles 'Bud' Tingwell, Candy Raymond, Jeanie Drynan, Bryan Brown, Alan Cassell, Gary Files, Ray Marshall, Hu Pryce, Lucky Grills, Frank Wilson, Terry Camilleri, Stuart Littlemore	
O C T O B E R	30	Message from Space	Toei Company / Tohokushinsha Film	Kinji Fukasaku (director); Hiro Matusda (screenplay); Vic Morrow, Sonny Chiba, Philip Casnoff, Peggy Lee Brennan, Etsuko Shihomi, Tetsuro Tamba, Mikio Narita, Makoto Satō, Hiroyuki Sanada, Hideyo Amamoto, Junkichi Orimoto, Isamu Shimizu, Masazumi Okabe, Noboru Mitani, Harumi Sone, Charles Scawthorn	
N O V E M B E R	1	The Great Bank Hoax	Warner Bros.	Joseph Jacoby (director/screenplay); Richard Basehart, Ned Beatty, Charlene Dallas, Burgess Meredith, Michael Murphy, Paul Sand, Constance Forslund, Arthur Godfrey, John C. Becher, Bibi Osterwald, Guy Le Bow, John Lefkowitz, Alek Primrose, Martha Sherrill, Roy Tatum	
N O V E M B E R	1	Power Play	Rank Film Distributors	Martyn Burke (director/screenplay); Edward N. Luttwak (screenplay); Peter O'Toole, David Hemmings, Donald Pleasence, Barry Morse, George Touliatos, Harvey Atkin, August Schellenberg, Chuck Shamata, Alberta Watson	
N O V E M B E R	1	Watership Down	AVCO Embassy Pictures	Martin Rosen (director/screenplay); John Hurt, Richard Briers, Michael Graham Cox, John Bennett, Ralph Richardson, Simon Cadell, Roy Kinnear, Terence Rigby, Mary Maddox, Richard O'Callaghan, Denholm Elliott, Zero Mostel, Harry Andrews, Hannah Gordon, Nigel Hawthorne, Lynn Farleigh, Clifton Jones, Derek Griffiths, Michael Hordern, Joss Ackland, Michelle Price	
N O V E M B E R	2	Caravans	Universal Pictures / FIDCI	James Fargo (director); Nancy Voyles Crawford, Thomas A. McMahon, Lorraine Williams (screenplay); Anthony Quinn, Jennifer O'Neill, Michael Sarrazin, Behrouz Vossoughi, Christopher Lee, Barry Sullivan, Jeremy Kemp, Joseph Cotten, Mohammad-Ali Keshavarz, Duncan Quinn, Behrouz Gramian, Parviz Gharib-Afshar, Fahimeh Amouzandeh, Mohammad Kahnemoui, Khosrow Tabatabai	
N O V E M B E R	8	Magic	20th Century Fox	Richard Attenborough (director); William Goldman (screenplay); Anthony Hopkins, Ann-Margret, Burgess Meredith, Ed Lauter, E.J. André, Jerry Houser, David Ogden Stiers, Lillian Randolph	
N O V E M B E R	8	Slow Dancing in the Big City	United Artists / CIP	John G. Avildsen (director); Barra Grant (screenplay); Paul Sorvino, Anne Ditchburn, Nicolas Coster, Thaao Penghlis, Hector Mercado, Brenda Joy Kaplan, Daniel Faraldo, Bill Conti, Richard Jamieson, Danielle Brisebois, Lloyd Kaufman, Barra Grant, Anita Dangler, Linda Selman, Dick Carballo, Jack Ramage, Adam Gifford, Michael Gorrin, Tara Mitton, Matt Russo, Ben Slack, Mimi Cecchini	
N O V E M B E R	10	The Children of Sanchez	Lone Star Pictures	Hall Bartlett (director/screenplay); Cesare Zavattini (screenplay); Anthony Quinn, Dolores del Rio, Katy Jurado, Lupita Ferrer, Lucia Mendez, Josefina Echanove, Patricia Reyes Spindola, Stathis Giallelis	
N O V E M B E R	10	Paradise Alley	Universal Pictures / Force Ten Productions Inc.	Sylvester Stallone (director/screenplay); Sylvester Stallone, Kevin Conway, Anne Archer, Joe Spinell, Armand Assante, Lee Canalito, Terry Funk, Frank McRae, Joyce Ingalls, Tom Waits, Aimee Eccles, John Cherry Monks Jr., Frank Stallone, Ted DiBiase	
N O V E M B E R	10	The Thirty Nine Steps	The Rank Organisation	Don Sharp (director); Michael Robson (screenplay); Robert Powell, David Warner, Eric Porter, Karen Dotrice, John Mills, George Baker, Ronald Pickup, Donald Pickering, Timothy West, Miles Anderson, Andrew Keir, Robert Flemyng, William Squire, Paul McDowell, David Collings, John Normington, John Welsh, Edward de Souza, Tony Steedman, John Grieve, Donald Bisset, Joan Henley, Prentis Hancock, James Garbutt, Robert Gillespie, Paul Jerricho, Michael Bilton, Derek Anders, Oliver Maguire, Leo Dolan, Artro Morris, Raymond Young	
N O V E M B E R	11	The Wild Geese	Allied Artists / Richmond Film Productions (West) Ltd / Varius Entertainment Trading A.G.	Andrew V. McLaglen (director); Reginald Rose (screenplay); Richard Burton, Roger Moore, Richard Harris, Hardy Krüger, Stewart Granger, Jack Watson, Frank Finlay, Kenneth Griffith, Jeff Corey, Barry Foster, Winston Ntshona, Ronald Fraser, John Kani, David Ladd, Ian Yule, Patrick Allen, Brook Williams, Percy Herbert, Jane Hylton, Paul Spurrier, Patrick Holt	
N O V E M B E R	14	Killer of Sheep	Third World Newsreel	Charles Burnett (director/screenplay); Henry G. Sanders, Kaycee Moore, Charles Bracy, Angela Burnett, Eugene Cherry, Jack Drummond	
N O V E M B E R	15	Blue Fin	Pacific International Enterprises / South Australian Film Corporation / McElroy and McElroy	Carl Schultz (director); Sonia Borg (screenplay); Hardy Krüger, Greg Rowe, Liddy Clark, Elspeth Ballantyne, John Jarratt, Hugh Keays-Byrne	
N O V E M B E R	15	The Further Adventures of the Wilderness Family	Pacific International Enterprises	Frank Zuniga (director); Arthur R. Dubs (screenplay); Robert Logan, Susan Damante-Shaw, Heather Rattray, Ham Larsen, George Buck Flower	
N O V E M B E R	15	Just a Gigolo	United Artists Classics	David Hemmings (director); Ennio De Concini, Joshua Sinclair (screenplay); David Bowie, Sydne Rome, Kim Novak, David Hemmings, Maria Schell, Curd Jürgens, Marlene Dietrich, Erika Pluhar, Hilde Weissner, Werner Pochath, Rudolf Schündler, Evelyn Künneke	
N O V E M B E R	15	The Lord of the Rings	United Artists / Fantasy Films	Ralph Bakshi (director); Peter S. Beagle, Chris Conkling (screenplay); Christopher Guard, William Squire, Michael Scholes, John Hurt, Simon Chandler, Dominic Guard, Norman Bird, Michael Graham Cox, Anthony Daniels, David Buck, Peter Woodthorpe, Fraser Kerr, Philip Stone, Michael Deacon, André Morell, Alan Tilvern, Annette Crosbie, John Westbrook	
N O V E M B E R	16	The Cat and the Canary	Grenadier Films	Radley Metzger (director/screenplay); Honor Blackman, Michael Callan, Edward Fox, Wendy Hiller, Olivia Hussey, Beatrix Lehmann, Carol Lynley, Daniel Massey, Peter McEnery, Wilfrid Hyde-White	
N O V E M B E R	22	Long Weekend	Hoyts Distribution / Dugong Films	Colin Eggleston (director); Everett De Roche (screenplay); John Hargreaves, Briony Behets, Roy Day, Mike McEwen, Michael Aitkens, Sue Kiss von Soly	
N O V E M B E R	22	Movie Movie	Warner Bros. / ITC Entertainment	Stanley Donen (director); Larry Gelbart, Sheldon Keller (screenplay); George C. Scott, Trish Van Devere, Barbara Harris, Red Buttons, Barry Bostwick, Ann Reinking, Art Carney, Eli Wallach, Rebecca York, Harry Hamlin, Jocelyn Brando, Michael Kidd, Kathleen Beller, Clay Hodges, George P. Wilbur, Peter Stader, Jimmy Lennon, Charles Lane, Stanley Donen, George Burns	
N O V E M B E R	22	Same Time, Next Year	Universal Pictures / The Mirisch Company	Robert Mulligan (director); Bernard Slade (screenplay); Ellen Burstyn, Alan Alda, Ivan Bonar	
N O V E M B E R	22	I Spit on Your Grave	The Jerry Gross Organization / Cinemagic Pictures	Meir Zarchi (director/screenplay); Camille Keaton, Eron Tabor, Richard Pace, Anthony Nichols, Gunter Kleemann, Alexis Magnotti, Tammy Zarchi, Terry Zarchi, William Tasgal	
N O V E M B E R	24	Carry On Emmannuelle	The Rank Organisation / Hemdale Film Corporation	Gerald Thomas (director); Lance Peters (screenplay); Kenneth Williams, Kenneth Connor, Joan Sims, Jack Douglas, Peter Butterworth, Beryl Reid, Suzanne Danielle, Larry Dann, Henry McGee, Victor Maddern, Dino Shafeek, Eric Barker, Joan Benham, Albert Moses, Robert Dorning, Steve Plytas, Michael Nightingale, Bruce Boa, Llewellyn Rees, Claire Davenport, Norman Mitchell, Howard Nelson, Tim Brinton, Corbett Woodall, Gertan Klauber, John Carlin, John Hallet, Malcolm Johns, Guy Ward, Suzanna East	
D E C E M B E R	8	The Brink's Job	Universal Pictures	William Friedkin (director); Walon Green (screenplay); Peter Falk, Peter Boyle, Allen Garfield, Warren Oates, Gena Rowlands, Paul Sorvino, Sheldon Leonard, Gerard Murphy, Kevin O'Connor, Claudia Peluso, Patrick Hines, Malachy McCourt, Walter Klavun, Randy Jurgensen, John Brandon, Robert Prosky	
D E C E M B E R	8	The Deer Hunter	Universal Pictures / EMI Films	Michael Cimino (director); Deric Washburn (screenplay); Robert De Niro, John Cazale, John Savage, Meryl Streep, Christopher Walken, George Dzundza, Pierre Segui, Shirley Stoler, Chuck Aspegren, Rutanya Alda, Amy Wright, Joe Grifasi	
D E C E M B E R	8	Force 10 from Navarone	American International Pictures / Navarone Productions	Guy Hamilton (director); Robin Chapman (screenplay); Robert Shaw, Harrison Ford, Barbara Bach, Edward Fox, Franco Nero, Carl Weathers, Richard Kiel, Alan Badel, Michael Byrne, Philip Latham, Angus MacInnes, Michael Sheard, Petar Buntic, Paul Humpoletz, Ramiz Pasic	
D E C E M B E R	8	Killer's Moon	Redemption Films / Rothernorth Films	Alan Birkinshaw (director/screenplay); Anthony Forrest, Tom Marshall, Jane Hayden, Alison Elliott, David Jackson, JoAnne Good, Lisa Vanderpump, Georgina Kean, Nigel Gregory, Paul Rattee, Peter Spraggon, Jayne Lester, Debbie Martyn, Christine Winter, Lynne Morgan, Jean Reeve, Elizabeth Counsell, Hilda Braid, Chubby Oates, James Kerry, Hugh Ross	
D E C E M B E R	15	Oliver's Story	Paramount Pictures	John Korty (director/screenplay); Erich Segal (screenplay); Ryan O'Neal, Candice Bergen, Nicola Pagett, Ed Binns, Benson Fong, Charles Haid, Kenneth McMillan, Ray Milland, Josef Sommer, Sully Boyar, Swoosie Kurtz, Meg Mundy, Beatrice Winde	
D E C E M B E R	15	Superman	Warner Bros. / Dovemead Ltd. / International Film Production	Richard Donner (director); Mario Puzo, David Newman, Leslie Newman, Robert Benton (screenplay); Marlon Brando, Gene Hackman, Christopher Reeve, Ned Beatty, Jackie Cooper, Glenn Ford, Trevor Howard, Margot Kidder, Valerie Perrine, Maria Schell, Terence Stamp, Phyllis Thaxter, Susannah York, Jack O'Halloran, Marc McClure, Sarah Douglas, Harry Andrews, Larry Hagman, Rex Reed, Kirk Alyn, Noel Neill, Jeff East, Diane Sherry	
D E C E M B E R	16	Pinocchio (re-issue)	Walt Disney Productions / Buena Vista Distribution	Ben Sharpsteen, Hamilton Luske, Bill Roberts, Norman Ferguson, Jack Kinney, Wilfred Jackson, T. Hee (directors); Ted Sears, Otto Englander, Webb Smith, William Cottrell, Joseph Sabo, Erdman Penner, Aurelius Battaglia (screenplay); Cliff Edwards, Dickie Jones, Christian Rub, Walter Catlett, Charles Judels, Evelyn Venable, Frankie Darro, Clarence Nash, Stuart Buchanan, Thurl Ravenscroft	
D E C E M B E R	17	Uncle Joe Shannon	United Artists	Joseph Hanwright (director); Burt Young (screenplay); Burt Young, Doug McKeon, Madge Sinclair, Jason Bernard, Bert Remsen, Allan Rich, Adrienne Larussa	
D E C E M B E R	20	Every Which Way but Loose	Warner Bros. / The Malpaso Company	James Fargo (director); Jeremy Joe Kronsberg (screenplay); Clint Eastwood, Sondra Locke, Geoffrey Lewis, Beverly D'Angelo, Ruth Gordon, John Quade, Dan Vadis, Roy Jenson, Bill McKinney, William O'Connell, Jeremy Joe Kronsberg, Gene LeBell, Judson Scott, James McEachin, Walter Barnes, Gregory Walcott, Hank Worden, George Chandler, Harry Guardino, Mel Tillis, Phil Everly, Manis, Gary Davis, Scott Dockstader, Orwin Harvey, Chuck Waters, Jerry Wills, Cary Michael Cheifer	
D E C E M B E R	20	King of the Gypsies	Paramount Pictures / Dino De Laurentiis Company	Frank Pierson (director/screenplay); Eric Roberts, Sterling Hayden, Shelley Winters, Susan Sarandon, Brooke Shields, Annette O'Toole, Judd Hirsch, Annie Potts, Michael V. Gazzo, Antonia Rey, Matthew Labyorteaux, Roy Brocksmith, Danielle Brisebois, Faith Minton	
D E C E M B E R	20	Starcrash	New World Pictures / Bancom Audiovision Corporation / Film Enterprise Production	Luigi Cozzi (director/screenplay); Nat Wachsberger, R.A. Dillon (screenplay); Marjoe Gortner, Caroline Munro, David Hasselhoff, Joe Spinell, Robert Tessier, Nadia Cassini, Judd Hamilton, Christopher Plummer	
D E C E M B E R	22	Brass Target	United Artists	John Hough (director); Alvin Boretz (screenplay); Sophia Loren, John Cassavetes, George Kennedy, Robert Vaughn, Patrick McGoohan, Bruce Davison, Edward Herrmann, Max von Sydow, Ed Bishop, Lee Montague, Bernard Horsfall, John Junkin, Sigfrit Steiner, Heinz Bennent, Brad Harris, Claudia Butenuth, Yulian Panich, Hal Galili, Reinhold Olszewski, Bob Cunningham, Osman Ragheb, Peter Armstrong, Richard Kley, Ray Le Clair, René Schoenberg	
D E C E M B E R	22	California Suite	Columbia Pictures / Rastar	Herbert Ross (director); Neil Simon (screenplay); Alan Alda, Michael Caine, Bill Cosby, Jane Fonda, Walter Matthau, Elaine May, Richard Pryor, Maggie Smith, Herb Edelman, Denise Galik, Gloria Gifford, Sheila Frazier, Dana Plato, David Sheehan, Len Lawson, Brian Cummings, Lupe Ontiveros, Army Archerd, Christopher Pennock, Tawny Moyer, Richard Burton	
D E C E M B E R	22	Invasion of the Body Snatchers	United Artists / Solofilm	Philip Kaufman (director); W.D. Richter (screenplay); Donald Sutherland, Brooke Adams, Leonard Nimoy, Jeff Goldblum, Veronica Cartwright, Art Hindle, Lelia Goldoni, Kevin McCarthy, Don Siegel, Robert Duvall, Philip Kaufman, Tom Luddy, Jerry Walter, Rose Kaufman, Joe Bellan	
D E C E M B E R	22	Moment by Moment	Universal Pictures / RSO Records	Jane Wagner (director/screenplay); Lily Tomlin, John Travolta, Andra Akers, Bert Kramer, Shelley R. Bonus, Debra Feuer, James Luisi	
D E C E M B E R	22	They Went That-A-Way & That-A-Way	The International Picture Show Company	Stuart E. McGowan, Edward Montagne (directors); Tim Conway (screenplay); Tim Conway, Chuck McCann, Richard Kiel, Dub Taylor, Reni Santoni, Lenny Montana, Sonny Shroyer, Ben L. Jones, Timothy Blake, Hank Worden	
D E C E M B E R	31	Ice Castles	Columbia Pictures	Donald Wrye (director/screenplay); Gary L. Baim (screenplay); Lynn-Holly Johnson, Robby Benson, Colleen Dewhurst, Tom Skerritt, Jennifer Warren, David Huffman, Leonard Lilyholm, Michelle McLean, Sydney Blake, Kelsey Ufford, Theresa Willmus	

== See also ==
- List of 1978 box office number-one films in the United States
- 1978 in the United States
