= The Wonder of It All =

Wonder of It All may refer to:

- "The Wonder of It All" (song), a Billboard Dance Chart number one hit single performed by Kristine W
- Wonder of It All (film), a 1974 nature documentary film that was produced by Pacific International Enterprises (PIE)
- The Wonder of It All (film), a 2007 film chronicling astronauts of the Apollo space missions
