= Born to Race =

Born to Race may refer to:

- Born to Race (1988 film), a film directed by James Fargo
- Born to Race (2011 film), a film directed by Alex Ranarivelo
- "Born to Race", a 2017 song by OneRepublic
