= Patriots (American film) =

- Movie Poster
- Directed by: Frank Kerr
- Written by: Frank Kerr
- Produced by: Frank Kerr
- Starring: Linda Amendola; Mark Newell; Aidan Parkinson; Dermott Petty; Carmel O'Reilly; James Conway as Kevin Whitehall
- Production company: Boston Pictures
- Distributed by: Cannes Home Vídeo
- Release date: December 31, 1994; (USA)
- Running time: 83 min.
- Country: United States
- Language: English

Patriots is a 1994 American film starring Linda Amendola and Mark Newell, written, produced and directed by Frank Kerr.

== Plot ==
An Irish-Bostonian girl persuaded to help the Irish Republican Army survives two weeks in Northern Ireland.

== Cast ==
- Linda Amendola as Alexis Shannon
- Mark Newell as Sean McGinnis
- Aidan Parkinson as Damien Ryan
- Dermott Petty as Paddy McClure
- Carmel O'Reilly as Belle McCreesh
- James Conway as Kevin Whitehall
- Robert Logan Jr. as British Soldier
