= Across the Great Divide (film) =

1976 film by Stewart Raffill

- Theatrical poster
- Directed by: Stewart Raffill
- Written by: Stewart Raffill
- Produced by: Arthur R. Dubs
- Starring: Robert Logan; George Buck Flower; Heather Rattray; Mark Edward Hall
- Cinematography: Gerard Alcan
- Edited by: R. Hansel Brown; Frank Decot
- Music by: Gene Kauer; Douglas Lackey
- Distributed by: Pacific International Enterprises
- Release date: December 20, 1976
- Running time: 100 minutes
- Country: United States
- Language: English
- Box office: $8 million

Across the Great Divide is a 1976 American Western film directed by Stewart Raffill and starring Robert Logan, Heather Rattray and George Buck Flower. The film was shot on location in Utah and Canada.

== Plot ==
In 1876, two orphans, Holly and Jason Smith, travel across the Rocky Mountains to claim their inheritance at the end of the Oregon Trail. They run into Zachariah Coop, a gambler on the run from a group of angry men. Coop tries to join the two kids, but at first they don't know whether to trust him. The trio shows unyielding courage in the face of hardship, adventure and danger as they travel across the Great Divide to reach their dream.

== Cast ==
- Robert Logan as Zachariah Coop
- Heather Rattray as Holly Smith
- Mark Edward Hall as Jason Smith
- George Buck Flower as Ben
- Hal Bokar as Sternface
- Frank Salsedo as Mosa

== Release ==
The film was released on December 20, 1976 by Pacific International Enterprises.

The film was officially released on DVD on January 1, 2003. More recently, the film was released on Blu-ray and digital format by Lionsgate.

== See also ==
- List of American films of 1976
- The Adventures of the Wilderness Family
- The Sea Gypsies
- Matt and Jenny
