= Heather Rattray =

American actress

- Occupation: Actress
- Years active: 1976–2001

Heather Rattray is an American actress who has starred in several movies and soap operas.

She has appeared in several family features co-starring with Robert Logan, including Across the Great Divide, Mountain Family Robinson, Suburb in the Wild, and The Sea Gypsies. Rattray briefly appeared in the recurring role of Wendy on Guiding Light in 1988 before assuming the role of Lily Walsh on As the World Turns. She played Lily from 1989 to 1993.

== Film ==
Year	Title	Role
1976	Across the Great Divide	Holly Smith
1978	The Further Adventures of the Wilderness Family	Jenny Robinson
1978	The Sea Gypsies	Courtney Maclaine
1979	Mountain Family Robinson	Jenny Robinson
1990	Basket Case 2	Susan Smoeller
2001	The Theory of the Leisure Class	Attorney

== Television ==
Year(s)	Title	Role	Notes
1988	Guiding Light	Wendy	Recurring role
1989–1993	As the World Turns	Lily Walsh	
1996	The Home Court	Woman #1	Episode: "Between a Shamrock and a Hard Place"
1997	Alright Already	Woman	Episode: "Again with the Sponge Cake"
