= The Sea Gypsies (film) =

- Theatrical release poster
- Directed by: Stewart Raffill
- Written by: Stewart Raffill
- Produced by: Joseph Raffill
- Starring: Robert Logan; Mikki Jamison-Olsen; Heather Rattray; Cjon Damitri Patterson; Shannon Saylor
- Cinematography: Tom McHugh
- Edited by: Dan Greer; R. Hansel Brown; Art Stafford
- Music by: Fred Steiner
- Distributed by: Warner Bros. Pictures
- Release date: April 1978
- Running time: 102 minutes
- Country: United States
- Language: English

The Sea Gypsies, also known as Shipwreck, is a 1978 family adventure film starring Robert Logan and Mikki Jamison-Olsen. The film's tagline is It began as a dream... and became an adventure of a lifetime.

The film was written and directed by Stewart Raffill, who wrote and directed the similarly themed Across The Great Divide and the first of the Wilderness Family films in the 1970s, all of which also starred Robert Logan. Heather Rattray portrayed Logan's daughter in four of these films including this one.

== Plot ==
Travis Maclaine and his two daughters, Courtney and Samantha, set off on a dangerous trip around the world on a sailboat. Along for the trip is Kelly Zimmerman, a journalist who has been assigned to cover the voyage. Also, Jesse, a stowaway, is found aboard adding a fifth person on the trip. Soon, they are shipwrecked on the coast of Alaska and must learn how to survive together in a sometimes dangerous environment.

== Main cast ==
- Robert Logan as Travis Maclaine
- Mikki Jamison-Olsen as Kelly Zimmerman
- Heather Rattray as Courtney Maclaine
- Shannon Saylor as Samantha Maclaine
- Cjon Damitri Patterson as Jesse
- Mark Litke as TV Reporter
- Nancy Loomis as Girlfriend

== See also ==
- Across the Great Divide
- The Adventures of the Wilderness Family
