= Joel Fein =

American sound engineer

- Born: June 19, 1944; Philadelphia, Pennsylvania, United States
- Died: September 22, 2007 (aged 63); Wichita, Kansas, United States
- Occupation: Sound engineer
- Years active: 1957–2007

Joel Fein (June 19, 1944 – September 22, 2007) was an American sound engineer. He was nominated for an Academy Award in the category Best Sound for the film The Buddy Holly Story.

== Selected filmography ==
- The Buddy Holly Story (1978)
