= Mystery Mansion (film) =

- DVD cover
- Directed by: David E. Jackson
- Written by: Jack Duggan; David Jackson; Arn Wihtol
- Produced by: Arthur R. Dubs
- Starring: Dal McKennon; Greg Wynne; Randi Brown
- Cinematography: Milas C. Hinshaw
- Music by: William Loose; Jack K. Tillar; Marty Wereski
- Distributed by: Pacific International Enterprises
- Release date: 1983
- Running time: 95 minutes
- Country: United States
- Language: English

Mystery Mansion is a 1983 family film directed by David E. Jackson and starring Dal McKennon, Greg Wynne and Randi Brown.

== Plot ==
Susan (Randi Brown) and her brother Johnny (David Wagner) come across an old map that may be a clue in finding gold, while staying at their aunt and uncle's house. Susan has been having nightmares about Rachel Drake, a young girl who vanished in 1889 from a nearby mansion when her parents were killed by bank robbers. The siblings make friends with Billy and soon began their search for the treasure as well as find out what happened to Rachel when they also come across a locket.

== Main cast ==
- Dal McKennon as Sam
- Greg Wynne as Gene
- Randi Brown as Susan
- David Wagner as Johnny
- Riley Novak as Billy
- Jane Ferguson as Mary
- Barry Hostetler as Fred
- Joseph D. Savery as Willy
- Karen Renee as Rachel Drake

== DVD details ==
- Release date: January 1, 2003
- Full Screen
- Region: 1
- Aspect Ratio: 1.33:1
- Audio tracks: English
- Subtitles: English, Spanish
- Running time: 95 minutes
