= Brothers and Sisters (1979 TV series) =

- Genre: Sitcom
- Created by: Arthur Silver; Bob Brunner
- Written by: Paul Diamond; Jeff Franklin; Allen Goldstein; Bernie Kahn; David Lerner; Brian Levant; Jerry Mayer; Andy Ruben; Roy Teicher
- Directed by: Nick Abdo; John Bowab; Lowell Ganz; Will Mackenzie; Dick Martin; Tony Mordente; Dennis Steinmetz; George Tyne
- Starring: William Windom; Chris Lemmon; Jon Cutler; Randy Brooks
- Composers: Ken Heller; Mark Snow
- Country of origin: United States
- Original language: English
- No. of seasons: 1
- No. of episodes: 12

Production
- Executive producers: Bob Brunner; Arthur Silver
- Producers: Nick Abdo; Hy Averback; Jerry Mayer
- Running time: 30 mins
- Production companies: Frog Productions; Huk, Inc. Paramount Television

Original release
- Network: NBC
- Release: January 21 – April 6, 1979

Brothers and Sisters is an American sitcom that aired on NBC from January to April 1979. The series attempted to capitalize on the success of the 1978 motion picture National Lampoon's Animal House. It was the second of three frat-house comedy series to air in early 1979 (the others were ABC's Delta House and CBS' Co-Ed Fever).

== Synopsis ==
Brothers and Sisters takes place on the campus of Larry Krandall College, with William Windom starring as President Larry Krandall. Chris Lemmon (Milos "Checko" Sabolcik), Jon Cutler (Larry Zipper), and Randy Brooks (Ronald Holmes III) play three students who live in the basement of Pi Nu fraternity, nicknamed "Le Dump". Rather than attend class, the three cellar-dwellers create havoc with the more strait-laced members of the fraternity, and interact with the Gamma Iota sorority sisters who live nearby.

On January 21, NBC debuted Brothers and Sisters as a follow-up to their telecast of Super Bowl XIII, three days after ABC aired the first episode of its Animal House-inspired series (which was, in fact, the official series in everything but name). Two weeks later (February 4), Co-Ed Fever made its debut on CBS after a broadcast of the motion picture Rocky, but all three "frat-house" series were off the air by the end of April (with Co-Ed Fever having only one episode broadcast) after all of them ran into trouble with the networks' Standards and Practices departments because of their content. Brothers and Sisters made its last appearance on April 6, 1979; Delta House followed suit on April 21, 1979.

Of the three (if CBS' series had been picked up), Brothers and Sisters was arguably the least successful of them (mainly because of the networks having three similar shows, not to mention NBC's own woes at the time), with the show's lack of success apparent when series regular Mary Crosby turned up as a celebrity on NBC's Hollywood Squares for a week in March 1979; host Peter Marshall mentioned Brothers and Sisters as airing "on another network", only to be informed by Crosby that they were, in fact, on the same network.

== Cast ==
- Chris Lemmon as Milos "Checko" Sabolcik
- William Windom as Larry Crandall
- Mary Crosby as Suzy Cooper
- Randy Brooks as Ronald Holmes III
- Larry Anderson as Harlan Ramsey
- Jon Cutler as Stanley Zipper
- Roy Teicher as Seymour
- Amy Johnston as Mary Lee

== Episodes ==
| No. | Title | Directed by | Written by | Original release date |
|---|---|---|---|---|
| 1 | "Pilot" | Lowell Ganz | Ron Leavitt & Brian Levant | January 21, 1979 |
Accepting a wager from snooty Pi Nu president Harlan, Zipper unwisely bets his entire tuition that he can lure beautiful sorority girl Suzi Cooper into his bedroom by midnight. As the deadline approaches, Zipper's buddy Checko devises a plan to help his friend win the bet.
| 2 | "High Time" | George Tyne | Ron Leavitt | January 26, 1979 |
When the college president's tipsy daughter passes out in their room after curfew, Checko, Ronald and Zipper try to sneak her back to her own room.
| 3 | "Man in Chains" | Dick Martin | Jeff Franklin | February 2, 1979 |
The angry sisters of Gamma Iota kidnap Zipper after suspecting him of stealing their diaries.
| 4 | "Mirror Image" | Tony Mordente | Paul Diamond | February 9, 1979 |
Scrambling to find Zipper a date for the Valentine's Day dance, the Pi Nu brothers settle on Seymour's overweight sister Marilyn, who is visiting for the weekend. As a prank, Harlan arranges for Zipper to be crowned "King of Hearts" at the dance.
| 5 | "Made in Japan" | Nick Abdo | Brian Levant | February 16, 1979 |
After seeing his pals Checko and Ronald split up over a beautiful Asian student, Zipper tries to force a truce by locking them in the same room together — unaware that the fraternity house is on fire.
| 6 | "A Wrenching Problem" | Dennis Steinmetz | Bernie Kahn | February 23, 1979 |
When Zipper's father arrives on campus for a visit, Checko and Ronald conspire to trick him into believing that his son is a model student. Since Harlan is out of town, Zipper attempts to pose as president of the fraternity.
| 7 | "Lucky Me" | John Bowab | David Lerner & Roy Teicher | March 9, 1979 |
Checko and Ronald attempt to cure Zipper of his tendency to hiccup when excited, which has been sabotaging his romantic life. Meanwhile, Harlan finds out and tells everyone.
| 8 | "Love and Marriage" | Will Mackenzie | Jerry Mayer | March 16, 1979 |
Checko, Ronald and Zipper organize their own version of "The Newlywed Game" after enrolling in a marriage survival course that requires pairing off with a female partner.
| 9 | "Spring Vacation" | Dennis Steinmetz | Paul Diamond | March 23, 1979 |
En route to Florida for spring break, Checko, Ronald and Zipper end up stranded at a seedy roadside diner when their car breaks down. They are shocked to discover the snobbish Mary Lee working as a waitress.
| 10 | "Save the Monkey" | Tony Mordente | David Lerner & Roy Teicher | March 28, 1979 |
Zipper creates chaos when he rescues a chimpanzee from a fatal research experiment. Mary Lee is none too happy when she winds up baby-sitting the lovable chimp, who mimics her every move.
| 11 | "Main Event" | Nick Abdo | Allen Goldstein & Levi Taylor | March 30, 1979 |
Harlan challenges Ronald to a boxing match to defend Mary Lee's honor, while Checko and Zipper take bets.
| 12 | "Truth or Consequences" | Dennis Steinmetz | Allen Goldstein & Levi Taylor | April 6, 1979 |
Harlan cheats on a calculus exam and Zipper is blamed for it.
