= Tex Rudloff =

American sound engineer (1926–2015)

- Born: Walter Cecil Rudloff; August 8, 1926; Coleman, Texas
- Died: October 10, 2015 (aged 89); Sherman Oaks, California
- Occupation: Sound engineer
- Years active: 1969-1993

Walter Cecil "Tex" Rudloff (August 8, 1926 – October 10, 2015) was an American sound engineer. He was nominated for an Academy Award in the category Best Sound for the film The Buddy Holly Story. His son, Gregg Rudloff, also worked in sound.

== Selected filmography ==
- The Buddy Holly Story (1978)
