= Kelly (film) =

- Theatrical release poster
- Directed by: Christopher Chapman
- Written by: Robert Logan; from his own story
- Produced by: Canadian Film Development Corporation(CFDC); George Anthony; Samuel V. Freeman
- Cinematography: Paul Van der Linden
- Edited by: David Nicholson
- Music by: Micky Erbe; Maribeth Solomon
- Distributed by: Paramount Pictures
- Release date: March 20, 1981 (Canada)
- Running time: 94 minutes
- Country: Canada
- Language: English

Kelly is a 1981 Canadian-made family adventure drama directed by Christopher Chapman and written by and starring Robert Logan. Twyla Dawn Vokins plays the title character Kelly. In the 1980s the film had much play on cable tv(HBO) and was of the heartwarming type of product usually found on the commercial ABC Afterschool Special.

== Story ==
Kelly, a preteen girl who has dyslexia, lives in Los Angeles, CA with her divorced mother (who left her father when she was born) and stepfather. She is somewhat errant, skips school, and doesn't have too good a relationship with her mother Susan. Susan, fed up and seeking a solution to Kelly's behavior, decides to pack Kelly off to her biological father, Dave, who is a bush pilot in Alaska. When Kelly arrives in Alaska, she exhibits some of the same behavior she had with her mother, but slowly over time, becomes ingratiated with her wilderness surroundings and neighbors. Dave's assistant, an old Inuit called Clut, teaches Kelly a few things about life amongst the local townspeople.

== Cast ==
- Robert Logan - Dave
- Twyla Dawn Vokins - Kelly
- George Clutesi - Clut
- Elaine Nalee - Susan
- Doug Lennox - Beechum
- Alec Willows - Brother Robin
- Dan Granirer - Jimbo
- Jack Leaf - Ephram
- Mona Cozart - Mabel
- Paddy White - Timothy
- Bob Collins - Tom
- Paul Coeur - Big Mac (*Paul Lolicoeur)
- Robert Windsor - Brother William
- Larry Koopman - Brother Thomas
- Sock Seki - Brother Peter

== Reception ==
The film received poor reviews from critics and was a box-office failure. The film had a budget of $3,000,000, but by the end if its run it only manged to gross $469,777, which mean it was a failure.
