= Mountain Family Robinson =

- DVD cover
- Directed by: John Cotter
- Written by: Arthur R. Dubs
- Produced by: Arthur R. Dubs
- Starring: Robert Logan; Susan Damante-Shaw; Heather Rattray; Ham Larsen; William Bryant; George Buck Flower
- Cinematography: James W. Roberson
- Edited by: Dan Greer; Clifford Katz
- Music by: Robert O. Ragland
- Distributed by: Pacific International Enterprises
- Release date: November 21, 1979
- Running time: 100 minutes
- Country: United States
- Language: English
- Box office: $4.8 million (theatrical rentals)

Mountain Family Robinson (a.k.a. Wilderness Family Part 3) is a 1979 family movie that stars Robert Logan, Susan Damante-Shaw and George Buck Flower. This film is a sequel to The Adventures of the Wilderness Family and The Further Adventures of the Wilderness Family and, like its predecessors, was filmed in the states of Colorado and Utah.

== Plot ==
In the third and final film, the Robinsons celebrate the arrival of spring after surviving a harsh winter. However, their happiness is short-lived when a Forest Service ranger informs them that they must prove their mountain home is located on a legitimate mining claim (which is on government land) or face eviction. Additionally, Pat discovers that her mother is ill and decides to return to Los Angeles.

== Main cast ==
- Robert Logan as Skip Robinson
- Susan Damante-Shaw as Pat Robinson
- Heather Rattray as Jenny Robinson
- Ham Larsen as Toby Robinson
- George Buck Flower as "Boomer"
- William Bryant as Forest Ranger

== Production ==
Parts of the film were shot in Colorado as well as the Uinta National Forest in Utah.

== Home media ==
The film was released on DVD on January 1, 2003 in Region 1 in a fullscreen 1.33:1 aspect ratio.

== See also ==
- The Adventures of the Wilderness Family
- The Further Adventures of the Wilderness Family
