= Pacific International Enterprises =

Film production company and distributor

- Type: Private
- Industry: Production company Film distributor
- Founded: 1974; 52 years ago
- Defunct: November 30, 2001; 24 years ago
- Headquarters: Medford, Oregon, United States
- Key people: Arthur R. Dubs

Pacific International Enterprises (PIE) was an American film production company and film distributor, founded by Arthur R. Dubs as a producer of family films. Pacific International Enterprises was a privately held company that had been in business for over thirty years as "A Universal Force in Family Film Entertainment". Their films have been continually licensed and re-licensed for television by various channels such as HBO, Disney, TNT, CBS and in over 100 countries worldwide. Many of the company's movies were filmed on location with outdoor scenery shots such as the state of Oregon in Sacred Ground, the state of Utah in Windwalker and the state of Colorado for the three films of the Wilderness Family for example.

The company went defunct on November 30, 2001, after filing for Chapter 7 bankruptcy. The founder, Arthur R. Dubs, died in June 2013. Lionsgate picked up distribution rights for DVD, Blu-ray and the digital format for the titles.

== Partial list of films ==
- Mystery Mansion (1983)
- Sacred Ground (1983)
- Windwalker (1980)
- The Late, Great Planet Earth (1979)
- Mountain Family Robinson (1979)
- Blue Fin (1978)
- The Further Adventures of the Wilderness Family (1978)
- Across the Great Divide (1976)
- The Adventures of the Wilderness Family (1975)
- Wonder of It All (1974)
- Challenge to Be Free (1972)
- American Wilderness (1970)
