= Amy Johnston (actress) =

American actress and drama coach (1954–2021)

- Johnston in Brothers and Sisters, 1979
- Born: September 22, 1954; La Jolla, California, U.S.
- Died: March 17, 2021 (aged 66); West Fork, Arkansas, U.S.
- Occupations: Actress, drama coach

Amy Johnston (September 22, 1954 – March 17, 2021) was an American film and television actress and drama coach. She played Mary Lee in the NBC sitcom Brothers and Sisters. As her appearances includes, The Buddy Holly Story, Welcome Back, Kotter, Brothers and Sisters, Rooster: Spurs of Death! (1977), and episode "Angels on the Street" of Charlie's Angels.

Johnston died in West Fork, Arkansas on March 17, 2021, at the age of 66, after a long battle with cancer.

== Filmography ==
=== Film ===
Year	Title	Role	Notes
1977	Rooster: Spurs of Death!	Reeva	
1978	Jennifer	Sandra Tremayne	
1978	The Buddy Holly Story	Cindy Lou	
1978	Sister Terri	Sister Agatha	
1979	But Mother!	Sharon Barkley	TV movie
1992	In the Best Interest of the Children	National Reporter	TV movie

=== Television ===
Year	Title	Role	Notes
1977	Welcome Back, Kotter	Cassy	2 episodes
1979	Brothers and Sisters	Mary Lee	12 episodes
1979	Charlie's Angels	Rose/Judy Harkins	2 episodes
1982	Cagney & Lacey	Donna Moline/Julie Carson	2 episodes
1985	Highway to Heaven	Hostess	1 episode
