= Wonder of It All (film) =

- Wonder of It All theatrical poster
- Directed by: Arthur R. Dubs
- Written by: James T. Flocker
- Starring: Les Biegel (narrator)
- Distributed by: Pacific International Enterprises
- Release date: January 1974
- Running time: 95 minutes
- Country: United States
- Language: English
- Box office: $4.3 million

Wonder of It All is a 1974 nature documentary film directed by Arthur R. Dubs and produced by Pacific International Enterprises.

== Film description ==
The film takes the viewer around the world to show the animals of the world in their natural habitats showing them in their day-to-day activities. This includes not only with their own kind but interacting and coexisting with other species, although some of the scenes are obviously artificially contrived by the film makers.

There are two scenes featuring "playful ferrets" interacting with other animals, one with two cougar kittens, and one with two black bears, but the ferrets are large male domestic ferrets which are not native to the United States. The only native American ferret is the black-footed ferret, an endangered species which lives only around prairie dog towns on the plains, not in the mountains, where these scenes were staged. No doubt the cougar kittens and black bears were captive animals, borne out by the fact that two of them are showing health problems. One of the kittens has a head tilt, caused by a balance problem, and the bear's protruding tongue indicates teeth missing in that part of the mouth.

Later in the film the narrator says that emperor penguin chicks spend the first few weeks riding on the feet of their mothers, when it is actually the fathers who care for the chicks for the first few weeks after they hatch.

Directed by Arthur R. Dubs, with narration by Les Biegel, this family film required seven years of filming.

== Reception ==
The film grossed $1.05 million in its first three weeks of release in the Los Angeles area in January 1974.

== DVD details ==
- Release date: January 1, 2003
- Full Screen
- Region: 1
- Aspect Ratio: 1.33:1
- Audio tracks: English
- Subtitles: English, Spanish
- Running time: 95 minutes
