= The Buddy Holly Story =

1978 film by Steve Rash

- Theatrical release poster
- Directed by: Steve Rash
- Screenplay by: Robert Gittler
- Story by: Alan Swyer
- Based on: Buddy Holly: His Life and Music (1975 biography) by John Goldrosen
- Produced by: Fred Bauer
- Starring: Gary Busey; Don Stroud; Charles Martin Smith; Conrad Janis; William Jordan
- Cinematography: Stevan Larner
- Edited by: David E. Blewitt; James Seidelman
- Music by: Joe Renzetti
- Production company: Innovisions; Edward Cohen Associates
- Distributed by: Columbia Pictures
- Release date: May 18, 1978
- Running time: 114 minutes
- Country: United States
- Language: English
- Budget: $1.2 million–$2 million
- Box office: $14.3 million

The Buddy Holly Story is a 1978 American biographical musical drama film directed by Steve Rash, about the life and career of 1950s rock-and-roll musician Buddy Holly. It stars Gary Busey in the title role, and is based upon John Goldrosen's 1975 biography of Holly. The film also stars Don Stroud, Charles Martin Smith, Conrad Janis, William Jordan, and Maria Richwine.

The film was released by Columbia Pictures on May 18, 1978. It was both a critical and commercial success, with particular praise for Busey's portrayal of Holly. Busey was nominated for both an Academy Award and Golden Globe for Best Actor, as well as a BAFTA Award nomination for Most Promising Newcomer to Leading Film Roles. The film also won an Oscar for Best Music, Adaptation Score (Joe Renzetti).

== Plot ==
In 1956, Buddy Holly and his friends, drummer Jesse Charles and bass player Ray Bob Simmons, regularly performed at a local roller rink in Lubbock, Texas, as The Crickets. A local radio station broadcasts the show. Holly plays a country song, then switches to a rock and roll song, exciting the teens much to the annoyance of the radio station's sponsor. Station manager Riley tells Holly that Coral Records vice president wants the band to make a recording in Nashville, Tennessee.

At the recording studio, Holly walks out when his rock-and-roll vision clashes with the producers' insistence that he play country music. Later, Riley says he sent a tape of the Crickets' roller rink performance to New York City music producer Ross Turner. Believing the demo tape is a master copy, Turner releases it without realizing the band has no contract. The record is a hit and Holly can now pursue music full time. In New York City, the Crickets meet with Turner; after initial resistance, he agrees that Holly can make music how he wants.

Sol Gittler books the Crickets for the famous Apollo Theater in Harlem, assuming they are a black band. He is stunned when three white Texans show up and he refuses to let them perform, fearing the audience's reaction. Holly points out that Gittler's telegram specifies that they only have to be in New York City for a week to be paid $1,000, so Gittler nervously allows them to perform, the first white act to perform at the Apollo. After an uncomfortable start, Holly's music soon wins over the audience and the Crickets are a hit. Turner's secretary, Maria Elena Santiago, catches Holly's eye but their budding romance is nearly ended when her strict aunt refuses to allow them to date. Holly convinces her to change her mind and on their first date, Holly proposes to Maria. She accepts and they are soon married.

After two years of success, Ray Bob and Jesse, feeling overshadowed by Holly and wanting to return to Texas, decide to quit while Holly believes it is necessary to remain in New York to stay popular. After appearing on CBS TV on The Ed Sullivan Show, Jesse and Ray Bob return to Lubbock with the agreement that they will retain the Crickets name. Though saddened by their departure, Holly carries on writing. He initially fears performing without them despite his manager emphasizing that touring is necessary to chart success. Holly is delighted when Maria becomes pregnant, though she sees he is frustrated professionally and urges him to go on tour.

On February 2, 1959, preparing for a concert at Clear Lake, Iowa, Holly charters a private plane to fly to Moorhead, Minnesota for the next concert after the tour bus has broken down. The Big Bopper and Ritchie Valens join him on the flight. Ray Bob and Jesse arrive at Maria's home, feeling nostalgic and wanting to revive the band, and Maria encourages them both that Buddy will be happy to see them. The Crickets plan to join Holly at his next tour stop. After playing his final song, "Not Fade Away", Holly bids the crowd farewell, expressing his hope to come back to Clear Lake to see them all again next year. A post-script reads:

"Buddy Holly died later that night along with J.P. "The Big Bopper" Richardson and Ritchie Valens in the crash of a private airplane just outside of Clear Lake ....and the rest is Rock 'N' Roll."

== Cast ==
- Gary Busey as Buddy Holly
- Don Stroud as Jesse Charles (based on Jerry Allison)
- Charles Martin Smith as Ray Bob Simmons (Joe B. Mauldin)
- Conrad Janis as Ross Turner (Norman Petty)
- William Jordan as Riley
- Maria Richwine as María Elena Holly
- Amy Johnston as Cindy Lou
- Dick O'Neill as Sol Gittler
- Fred Travalena as Madman Mancuso
- Neva Patterson as Mrs. Holly
- Arch Johnson as Mr. Holly
- John Goff as T. J.
- Gloria Irizarry as Mrs. Santiago
- Jody Berry as Engineer Sam
- Richard Kennedy as Preacher
- Jim Beach as Wilson
- Gailard Sartain as The Big Bopper
- Gilbert Melgar as Ritchie Valens
- Albert Popwell as Eddie Foster
- Paul Mooney as Sam Cooke
- Freeman King as Apollo M.C.
- Stymie Beard as Luther
- Craig White as King Curtis
- Jerry Zaremba as Eddie Cochran

== Historical accuracy ==
While the story follows Buddy Holly from age 20 to 22 (1956 to February 1959), Busey was 33 when he played the role. Ray Bob Simmons and Jesse Charles were character names used in place of Joe B. Mauldin and Jerry Allison, two of the actual Crickets (1956 to early 1958 Cricket Niki Sullivan, performing on 27 of the 32 songs Holly recorded, is not shown).

The incident in which a Buffalo disc jockey locked himself in a studio and repeatedly played the same song over and over was loosely based on real-life stunts orchestrated by disc jockey Tom Clay (and repeated a few years later by Danny Neaverth), who held up Buffalo's Shelton Square by playing Bill Haley & His Comets' "Rock Around the Clock" repeatedly from the top of a billboard, and by Joey Reynolds, who locked himself in a studio playing "Sherry" by the Four Seasons for several hours; those incidents, however, had no relation to Buddy Holly or his music.

According to Holly's parents, their pastor never condemned their son’s music, and Buddy had a good relationship with his pastor and tithed his music earnings regularly.

== Production ==
The actors did their own singing and played their own instruments, with guitarist Jerry Zaremba overdubbing the guitar parts. Busey, in particular, was noted for recording the soundtrack music live and for losing a considerable amount of weight in order to portray the skinny Holly. According to Busey's biography, he lost 32 pounds to look more like Holly, who weighed 146 pounds at the time of his death.

The actor's accurate portrayal was aided by knowledge gained from a previous attempt to film part of the Holly life story, the ill-fated Three-Sided Coin, in which he played Crickets drummer Jerry Allison. The film was cancelled by 20th Century Fox due to pressure from Fred Bauer and his company, who had made deals with the Holly estate. The screenplay of Three-Sided Coin (by Allison and Tom Drake) revealed many personal details about Holly, and Busey picked up more during off-set conversations with Allison.

Charles Martin Smith auditioned for the role of Buddy, but since Busey already had been cast, the producers cast Smith to play Ray Bob Simmons because they liked his audition.

Though the production scouted locations in Holly's hometown of Lubbock, they found the city had changed too much from the 1950s. Most of the film was shot in Los Angeles and Atlanta, with various locations doubling for period-era Texas and New York City.

== Release ==
The film had a special premiere in nine different Texas and Oklahoma cities on May 18, 1978, including Holly's hometown of Lubbock and Busey's hometown of Tulsa, before opening in Los Angeles on June 14.

== Reception ==
=== Box office ===
The film was a financial success, earning $14.3 million on a $1.2 million budget.

=== Critical response ===
Roger Ebert gave the film three and a half stars out of four and praised Busey's "remarkable performance as Buddy Holly. If you're a fan of Holly and his music, you'll be quietly amazed at how completely Busey gets into the character." Vincent Canby of The New York Times wrote, "There are a lot of actors in 'The Buddy Holly Story'—some of them very nice—but the movie is really a one-man show. It's Gary Busey's galvanizing solo performance that gives meaning to an otherwise shapeless and bland feature-length film about the American rock-and-roll star who was killed in a plane crash in 1959." Gene Siskel gave the film four stars out of four and wrote, "In a year in which we are inundated with films featuring rock music, 'The Buddy Holly Story' probably will turn out to be the best. That is because of Busey's galvanizing performance." Charles Champlin of the Los Angeles Times wrote, "The heart and soul and power of 'The Buddy Holly Story' is the uncanny, marrow-deep, robust, exhilarating, likable, superlative, overwhelmingly convincing portrayal by Gary Busey ... For once there is no lip-synching to someone else's voice, no feigning with the fingers to somebody else's strumming. Busey does it all himself, and it is one of those rare and stunning performances in which the person of the actor himself is totally lost to sight in his creation of someone else." Gary Arnold of The Washington Post wrote, "Gary Busey invests the title role with a personal charm so original and an emotional dedication so exhilarating that he seems to lift the material off its somewhat pedestrian feet."

The Buddy Holly Story holds a 100% rating on Rotten Tomatoes based on 32 reviews, with a weighted average of 7.3/10. The New York Times placed the film on its Best 1000 Movies Ever list.

Peggy Sue Gerrow Allison Rackham, to whom the song "Peggy Sue" was written, called the film "typical Hollywood, gobbledygook fantasy". Ex-Beatle Paul McCartney wasn't positive about the film either. Being interviewed and involved in the production of director Richard Spence's documentary The Real Story of Buddy Holly, McCartney decided after seeing the film to make a more accurate account of what happened. In a Rolling Stone interview, executive producer Ed Cohen, director Steve Rash and producer Freddy Bauer defended inaccuracies in the movie, pointing out the budget of the movie was only two million dollars. "Whatever we put up there on the screen will be the truth", commented Bauer. "Ask moviegoers who invented the telephone. They'll tell you that Don Ameche did." According to Rolling Stone, the three major complaints concerned the portrayal of Holly's family, the treatment of the Crickets and the omission of Norman Petty, Holly's producer.

=== Awards and nominations ===
The film won the Academy Award for Best Adaptation Score by Joe Renzetti. Busey was nominated for Best Actor in a Leading Role (losing to Jon Voight for Coming Home), and Tex Rudloff, Joel Fein, Curly Thirlwell and Willie D. Burton for Best Sound (losing to Richard Portman, William McCaughey, Aaron Rochin and Darin Knight for The Deer Hunter). Busey also went on to be nominated for the Golden Globe Award for Best Actor in a Comedy or Musical (losing to Warren Beatty for Heaven Can Wait), the BAFTA Award (losing to Dennis Christopher in Breaking Away), and the New York Film Critics Circle (losing, again, to Voight). Busey did, however, go on to win acting prizes from both the National Society of Film Critics and the Los Angeles Film Critics Association.
