= Robert Gittler =

American screenwriter

- Born: August 11, 1942 United States
- Died: May 16, 1978 (aged 35) United States
- Occupation: Writer

Robert Gittler was an American writer best known for writing the screenplay for The Buddy Holly Story, an Oscar-winning (for its music) motion picture.

Gittler committed suicide in 1978, two days before the theatrical release of The Buddy Holly Story.
