= Born to Race (1988 film) =

1988 film by James Fargo

- Directed by: James Fargo
- Written by: Mary Janeway Bullians; Dennis McGee
- Produced by: Andrew Bullians; Jean Bullians; Nicholas Longhurst
- Starring: Joseph Bottoms; Marla Heasley; Robert Logan; George Kennedy; Marc Singer
- Cinematography: Bernard Salzmann
- Edited by: Thomas Stanford; Tony Lombardo
- Music by: Ed Grenga; Ross Vannelli
- Production company: MGM/UA Communications Co.
- Distributed by: United Artists
- Release date: January 29, 1988
- Running time: 98 minutes
- Country: United States
- Language: English
- Budget: $4.5 million

Born to Race is a 1988 film directed by James Fargo. It stars Joseph Bottoms and Marla Heasley.

== Plot ==
Al Pagura is a NASCAR driver who wants to win. He finds out that a beautiful Italian auto engineer is trying to sell her new engine. At the same time, rival team owner Vincent Dupalin kidnaps her so his driver Kenny Landruff can win. Al and his pit crew rescue her. In the last race at Charlotte, Landruff passes Al on the last lap and just when it seems he is going to win, his engine blows and he hits the wall. Al wins as Dupalin is arrested while Landruff is airlifted to the hospital.

== Cast ==
- Joseph Bottoms as Al Pagura
- Marla Heasley as Andrea Lombardo
- Robert Logan as Theo Jennings
- George Kennedy as Vincent Duplain
- Marc Singer as Kenny Landruff
- Dirk Blocker as Bud
- Michael McGrady as Walt
- LaGena Hart as Jenny
- Leon Rippy as Joel
- Antonio Sabato Sr as Enrico Lombardo

== Soundtrack ==
The soundtrack was written by Ross Vannelli and Ed Grenga. The soundtrack includes couple of instrumental pieces but mainly songs performed by well-known artists of the 1980s. Some of the songs were later reused in the 1989 film Speed Zone and released on its soundtrack album.

- "Born to Race" (Title Song) - James House. Written by Ross Vannelli & Ed Grenga.
- "Nothing Else But Love" - Richard Marx. Written by Ross Vannelli & Richard Marx.
- "Surrender to Me" - Joe Pizzulo & Terry Wood. Written by Richard Marx & Ross Vannelli.
- "Perfect Crime" - Rocky Burnette (credited "Rocky Burnett"). Written by Ross Vannelli & Ed Grenga.
- "Do It for the Money" - Ross Vannelli. Written by Ross Vannelli & Ed Grenga.
- "Andrea (My Heart's on Fire)" - Written by Ross Vannelli, Ed Grenga, and Gloria Sklerov.
- "Message to You" - Terry Wood. Written by Ross Vannelli, Ed Grenga, and Gloria Sklerov.
