= Dermott Petty =

Dermott Petty is an independent filmmaker from Lisdoonvarna, County Clare in Ireland.

== Film career ==
In 1998 Petty won a Dramalogue Award for his stage direction of The Midnight Court. He produced a television pilot detailing his early experiences as an emigrant entitled Dot Ave, and a documentary about traditional Irish Ceilidh dancing called A Gathering. He was a recipient of a grant from the Irish Film Board for his script, The Prodigal Dancer.

He wrote and directed a short film entitled Paddy Takes a Meeting which played at the Galway Film Fleadh and at film festivals worldwide. He also made a short documentary, The Last Chance Saloon, which won an award at the VOV Film Festival in Los Angeles.

Petty made the feature film Manband!, a comedy on ageism, boy-bands and bad dancing which played at the Rat Powered Film Festival in Santa Ana, California, at Chapman University in Orange, California and at the Glor Music Center in Ennis, Ireland.

He created the first Irish Spaghetti Western with Sean Nós Dancing with the short film 'The Good the Bad & the Sean Nós Dancer' as a media prototype for his MA In Creative Media at the Tralee Institute of Technology in 2013. The Good the Bad & the Sean Nós Dancer

He has written and directed Animation. Starting with 'Jesus of Limerick'(2009) The Man From Q web series (2013) and 'the Leprechaun & the Stripper'(2015) web series The Leprechaun & the Stripper.

== Filmography ==
Year	Film	Capacity	Notes
	Dot Ave		Television pilot
	A Gathering		Documentary
	The Last Chance Saloon		
2002	Paddy Takes a Meeting	Director and writer	
2006	Manband!	Director and writer	
2009	Jesus of Limerick (Short)		
2011	Waits in Love (Short)		
2012	For Goth & Country (Short)		
2012	The Man from Q (Short)		
2013	The Good the Bad & the Sean Nós Dancer (Short)		
2014	1916 a form of Revolution (short)		
2015	The Leprechaun & the Stripper (short)		
2016	The Good Ship Delirious (Video short)		
2018	The Waiting is Over? (Short)		
