= The Further Adventures of the Wilderness Family =

- DVD cover
- Directed by: Frank Zuniga
- Written by: Arthur R. Dubs
- Produced by: Arthur R. Dubs
- Starring: Robert Logan; Susan Damante-Shaw; Heather Rattray; Ham Larsen; George Buck Flower
- Cinematography: John Hora
- Edited by: Tom Boutross; John Joseph
- Music by: Gene Kauer; Douglas M. Lackey
- Distributed by: Pacific International Enterprises
- Release dates: July 22, 1978 (Japan); November 15, 1978 (United States)
- Running time: 105 minutes
- Country: United States
- Language: English
- Box office: $5.5 million (theatrical rentals)

The Further Adventures of the Wilderness Family (a.k.a. Wilderness Family Part 2) is a 1978 adventure/family movie that stars Robert Logan, George Buck Flower, and Susan Damante-Shaw and is a sequel to The Adventures of the Wilderness Family. In this sequel to the first movie, Heather Rattray now plays the role of Jenny Robinson.

Barry Williams (Greg Brady from The Brady Bunch) sings some of the songs in the soundtrack of this movie. The third and final film in this family film series, Mountain Family Robinson, was released in 1979.

== Plot ==
In this sequel, the Robinsons continue their relaxed life in the mountains. More adventure awaits as they prepare themselves for the upcoming fierce winter. Pat fights a bout of pneumonia as the cold weather takes hold. The wildlife continues to be menacing and dangerous at times. Skip attempts to return to civilization for medication to treat Pat's pneumonia on skis and is caught in an avalanche. Meanwhile, Pat and the children, Jenny and Toby, are terrorized by a pack of hungry wolves led by the giant pack leader named "Scarface" because of his disfigured eye. Toby struggles to fight them off with a rifle as they methodically tear their way into the house and finally confronts Scarface in an explosive climax. The Robinsons' courage and the will to survive, along with breathtaking surroundings, help keep the family happy in their mountain home.

== Main cast ==
- Robert Logan as Skip Robinson
- Susan Damante-Shaw as Pat Robinson
- Heather Rattray as Jenny Robinson
- Ham Larsen as Toby Robinson
- George Buck Flower as Boomer
- Bruno the Bear as Samson

== Production ==
The movie was filmed in Colorado. Parts of the film were also shot in the Uinta National Forest in Utah.

== Reception ==
The film premiered in Tokyo on July 22, 1978 and grossed $127,343 in its first two days from five theaters.

== See also ==
- The Adventures of the Wilderness Family
- Mountain Family Robinson
