= The Wonder of It All (film) =

The Wonder of it All
- Directed by: Jeffrey Roth
- Written by: Jeffrey Roth; Paul M. Basta; Gregory Schwartz
- Produced by: Paul Basta; Gregory Schwartz
- Starring: Buzz Aldrin; Alan Bean; Edgar Mitchell; John Young; Charlie Duke; Gene Cernan; Harrison Schmitt
- Narrated by: Steve Evans
- Cinematography: Paul M. Basta
- Edited by: Andy Zall; David DeMore
- Music by: Scott Starrett
- Production company: Playground Productions
- Distributed by: Quiver Distribution
- Release date: August 1, 2007
- Running time: 82 minutes
- Country: United States
- Language: English

The Wonder of It All is a 2007 documentary film directed by Jeffrey Roth and distributed by Quiver Distribution.

The film is composed of first-person interviews with seven of the 12 Apollo astronauts who walked on the Moon (Buzz Aldrin, Alan Bean, Edgar Mitchell, John Young, Charlie Duke, Eugene Cernan, and Harrison Schmitt). The astronauts explain their backgrounds, their Moon missions, and how walking on the Moon changed their lives.
