= Susan Damante =

American actress

- Other name: Susan Damante-Shaw
- Years active: 1972–2007, 2013, 2018–present
- Children: Vinessa Shaw

Susan Damante (formally credited as Susan Damante-Shaw) is an American actress who has starred in various films and television programs. She is the mother of Vinessa Shaw (an actress).

== Personal life ==
Damante is a Nichiren Buddhist and a member of Soka Gakkai International. She has Crohn's disease.

== Partial filmography ==
- Blood Sabbath (1972)
- Emergency! TV series 2 episodes (1972)
- The Great American Beauty Contest (1973)
- The Student Teachers (1973)
- The Photographer (1974)
- The Rockford Files TV series 1 episode (1974)
- The Adventures of the Wilderness Family (1975)
- Columbo: Troubled Waters (1975)
- Further Adventures of the Wilderness Family (1978)
- Mountain Family Robinson (1979)
- Dallas (1982)
- Falcon Crest TV series 3 episodes (1986)
- Ladybugs (1992)
- No Easy Way (1996)
- Coyote Summer (1996)
