= The Adventures of the Wilderness Family =

1975 film

- Theatrical release poster
- Directed by: Stewart Raffill
- Written by: Arthur R. Dubs; Stewart Raffill
- Produced by: Arthur R. Dubs
- Starring: Robert Logan; Susan Damante-Shaw; Hollye Holmes; Ham Larsen
- Cinematography: Gérard Alcan
- Edited by: R. Hansel Brown
- Music by: Gene Kauer; Douglas M. Lackey
- Distributed by: Pacific International Enterprises
- Release date: December 19, 1975
- Running time: 100 minutes
- Country: United States
- Language: English
- Box office: $28.8 million (theatrical rentals: $14.87 million)

The Adventures of the Wilderness Family (also known as The Wilderness Family) is a 1975 American family adventure drama film directed by Stewart Raffill and starring Robert Logan, George Buck Flower and Susan Damante-Shaw. The film is about Skip Robinson and his family who decide to move from Los Angeles, California to a new home in the majestic Rocky Mountains, where Skip builds a log cabin and the children befriend wild animals. As the intrepid Robinsons make a simpler life for themselves off the grid, they discover that, in the wilderness, each day brings its own adventure.

The Adventures of the Wilderness Family was released in theaters on December 19, 1975, by Pacific International Enterprises, and grossed $28.8 million. The film had two sequels: The Further Adventures of the Wilderness Family (1978, also known as Wilderness Family Part 2) and Mountain Family Robinson (1979). The filming location was the Gunnison National Forest in the state of Colorado.

== Plot ==
Skip Robinson is a construction worker who lives with his family in Los Angeles, California. Concerned about his eleven year old daughter Jenny's health and the welfare of his family, as well as despising his job, Skip grows tired of the city life and decides to move his family to the Rocky Mountains with no plans to ever return due to the smog and congestion. After moving his wife Pat and two children, Jenny and seven year old Toby, to the wilderness and then building their own cabin near a large lake, they settle in to find out that their new environment isn't always as peaceful as it may appear.

From the start, the Robinson family seemed to be adjusting to their new life in the Colorado wilderness. A few days after finishing building their new cabin, Toby and Skip go out hunting one morning with their dog Crust (as per the script, although the close captioning in the first movie reads "Kress"), and succeed in catching a grouse for the family dinner. Later that day, while climbing along the rocky slopes of a large hill, Skip and his son almost get caught in a deadly landslide. They later find a pair of young grizzly bear cubs who have lost their mother to the same landslide they got caught in. The cubs are quickly adopted into the Robinson family, but Pat and Skip tell their children that sooner or later the cubs would have to be released back into the wild when they are fully grown.

During the next few weeks, the Robinson family slowly adapt to their new life in the mountains. In addition to the two young bear cubs and their family dog, Skip and his family also befriend a raccoon that they find living near their cabin and name him Bandito. While Jenny and Toby are collecting flowers, they encounter cougar cubs near their den. The family receive numerous letters and packages from friends and family back in Los Angeles. Pat receives several letters from her mother and Jenny and Toby are given numerous schoolbooks from the Los Angeles schoolboard. Skip continues hunting for small game and fishing in the nearest creek to provide food for his family, while his wife works around the house and their two children work on their schoolwork.

One day, while fishing for some trout down by the creek with the two grizzly cubs, Skip and the cubs are scared by a large black bear that was roaming along the creek bed. Jenny and Toby had gone out for a walk with Crust, to which they later encounter the same bear that their dad saw down by the creek. While Toby heads back to the cabin to get his parents, Jenny goes after Crust, who has managed to scare the bear away. Skip is informed by Toby of what happened, and he heads out with his rifle to find his daughter.

While trying to find their way back to the cabin, Jenny and Crust are attacked by a pack of gray wolves who chase them down to a nearby lake and almost attack Jenny. Crust is able to fend the wolves off long enough for Skip to arrive in the nick of time and drive the pack away. Despite this frightening encounter, Jenny quickly recovers from the shock of what had happened and is brought home safe and sound.

The next day, Skip and his family meet a friendly aging mountain man who introduces himself as Boomer. Boomer informs them that he had been a longtime partner and friend to Ol' Jake, Skip's uncle who lived in the same area where the Robinsons had built their cabin. Ol' Jake had been known to take extremely good care of the local wildlife in the area, including a friendly black bear named Samson he raised from a cub to a massive adult that was the same black bear that Skip and his family had encountered a few times before. Boomer also warns Skip and his family to keep a watchful eye for Three-Toes, a locally notorious grizzly bear that has been known to invade the properties of humans who are living in the mountains. Boomer is then forced to leave when the two bear cubs accidentally frighten away Boomer's mule Flora.

Later on, while the family was out gathering a large bear walks into their cabin. Seeing it's a black bear, the children decide it must be Samson. Taking a risk, Skip follows Boomer's advice and "introduces himself". Thankfully it pays off and the bear, who turns out to be Samson, befriends the family and joins them for dinner. The family settles in further to their new life, gathering from the surrounding forests and spending time with their new animal friends and Boomer.

One day, while Pat and Jenny are picking berries, they encounter Three-Toes; Crust manages to fend off Three-Toes while Pat retrieves Jenny, who suffered a massive shock. Skip goes to find Crust while tracking down Three-Toes. The following morning, Jenny's condition has gotten worse, Skip tries to call for help but the radio's batteries are dead, so he has to walk to get help. During a windstorm, Three-Toes tries to break into the cabin, but Pat tries to fend him off. Samson comes to the family's defense and engages Three-Toes in a brawl as Pat reloads the gun. Samson manages to hold the grizzly off long enough and Pat manages to shoot Three-Toes, killing him. Skip returns with a doctor, saying that Jenny's health is improving. Pat is still hesitant about staying but she agrees to adapt as this is a better life for her and her family. Boomer then shows up and comically loses his animal again, and the children run off to help him.

== Cast ==
- Robert Logan as Skip Robinson
- Susan Damante-Shaw as Pat Robinson
- Hollye Holmes as Jenny Robinson
- Ham Larsen as Toby Robinson
- George Buck Flower as "Boomer"
- Bruno the Bear as Samson

== Production ==
Parts of the film were shot in Summit County, Utah and Colorado.

== Home media ==
Originally released on VHS by Pacific International Enterprises. More recently, the film series was released on DVD, Blu-ray and the digital format by Lionsgate.

== See also ==
- The Further Adventures of the Wilderness Family
- Mountain Family Robinson
- List of American films of 1975
- My Side of the Mountain
