= Robert Logan Jr. =

American actor (1941–2024)

Robert Logan
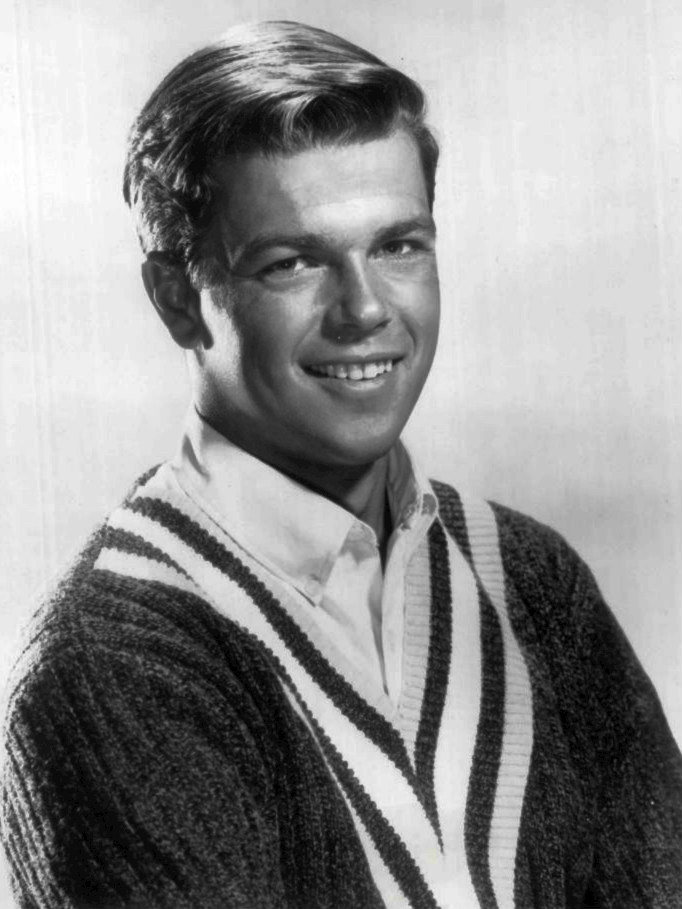
- Logan as J.R. Hale in the series 77 Sunset Strip (1962)
- Born: May 29, 1941; Brooklyn, New York, U.S.
- Died: May 6, 2024 (aged 82); Estero, Florida, U.S.
- Occupation: Actor
- Years active: 1961–1997
- Spouses: Susan Henning (m. 1967; div. 1969); Alina Milián (m. 1986)
- Children: 2

Robert Francis Logan (May 29, 1941 – May 6, 2024) was an American actor who appeared in numerous films and television programs, the most notable of which were a successful series of family adventure films in the 1970s.

== Life and career ==
Born in the Brooklyn borough of New York City, Logan was the eldest of seven children born to bank executive Francis Logan and Catherine Quigley. Young "R.J." was active in high-school sports; he received a baseball scholarship to the University of Arizona at Tucson. There, he was spotted by a Warner Bros. talent agent. Logan had two children a daughter by his first wife and a son, Anthony Logan, by his second wife. Logan starred in a number of family-oriented films such as the Wilderness Family film series.

From 1961 to 1963, Logan played J.R. Hale, the young valet parking attendant on ABC's 77 Sunset Strip. Logan succeeded the previous attendant, Kookie, played by Edward Byrnes, who in the story line became a full-fledged investigator. From 1965 to 1966, Logan played the part of Jericho Jones on NBC's Daniel Boone.

Logan died on May 6, 2024, twenty-three days shy of his 83rd birthday.

== Filmography ==
Year	Title	Role	Notes
1958-1963	77 Sunset Strip	J. R. Hale / Bob / George Tishman / Johnnie	72 episodes
1961	Claudelle Inglish	Charles Henry	
1961	Maverick	Ben Daniels	Episode: "Cactus Switch"
1964	Mr. Novak	Jerry Hendricks	NBC-TV, episode: "Johnny Ride the Pony: One, Two, Three"
1965	Beach Ball	Bango	
1965-1966	Daniel Boone	Jericho Jones	12 episodes
1969	The Bridge at Remagen	Pvt. Bissell	
1971	Catlow	Oley	
1975	The Adventures of the Wilderness Family	Skip Robinson	
1976	Across the Great Divide	Zachariah Coop	
1977	Snowbeast	Tony Rill	TV movie
1978	The Sea Gypsies	Travis Maclaine	
1978	The Further Adventures of the Wilderness Family	Skip Robinson	
1979	Mountain Family Robinson	Skip Robinson	
1981	Death Ray 2000	T.R. Sloane	TV movie
1981	Kelly	Dave	
1983	A Night in Heaven	Whitney Hanlon	
1984	Riptide	Father Bob	Episode: "Father's Day"
1986	Scorpion	Gordon Thomas	
1987	Man Outside	Jack Avery	
1988	Born to Race	Theo Jennings	
1996	Patriots	British Soldier	
1997	Redboy 13	Col. Lawrence G. Calcan	(final film role)
