= Stray =

Stray or The Stray or variation, may refer to:

== Animals ==
- A feral (abandoned or escaped) domestic animal; see also estray
- A stray or free-ranging dog

== Places ==
- Areas of open grassland in North Yorkshire:
  - Strays of York
  - The Stray (Harrogate)
  - The Stray, an area of open grassland in Redcar

== Film ==
- Strays (1991 film), an American made-for-television horror film
- Strays (1997 film), an American drama film by Vin Diesel
- A Stray, a 2016 film with Barkhad Abdi
- The Stray (film), 2017 film with Sarah Lancaster and Michael Cassidy
- The Strays (film), a 2023 British horror-thriller film
- Strays (2023 film), an American live-action/animated comedy film
- Stray, planned film adaptation of the eponymous 2022 video game

== Television ==
- Strays (TV series), spin-off of Kim's Convenience

=== Episodes ===
- "The Stray" (Westworld), 2016 episode
- "Stray", episode of Law & Order: Criminal Intent (season 3)
- "Stray", episode of Smallville (season 1)
- "Strays", 2004 episode, see list of The Shield episodes
- "Strays", 2017 episode, see list of One Day at a Time (2017 TV series) episodes

== Music ==
- 97.2 Stray FM, a radio station based in Harrogate, North Yorkshire, UK

=== Bands ===
- Stray (band), a 1966-1970s rock group from London, led by Del Bromham
- Stray, a side project by American band Unter Null

=== Albums ===
- Stray (album), an album by Aztec Camera
- Strays (Jane's Addiction album)
- Strays (Junkhouse album)
- Strays (Margo Price album)

=== Songs ===
- "Stray", a song by Aztec Camera from the eponymous album Stray (album)
- "Stray", a song by Bradley Joseph from Rapture
- "Stray", a song by Yoko Kanno and Steve Conte used as the opening theme for the anime Wolf's Rain
- "Stray", a 2022 song by Strayz
- "Strays", a song by Jane's Addiction from the eponymous album Strays (Jane's Addiction album)
- "The Strays", a song by Sleeping With Sirens from the album Madness
- "Stray", a song by The Mysterines, lead single from the album Afraid of Tomorrows

== People ==
- Thomas Stray (born 1970), Norwegian businessman
- Tom Stray (born 1987), Australian cricketer

== Other uses ==
- Stray (video game), a 2022 video game developed by BlueTwelve Studio
- Stray (novel), a novel by A.N. Wilson

== See also ==
- Stray bullet
