= I Never Promised You a Rose Garden =

I Never Promised You a Rose Garden may refer to:

- I Never Promised You a Rose Garden (novel), a 1964 semi-autobiographical novel of a teenage girl's battle with schizophrenia by Joanne Greenberg
  - I Never Promised You a Rose Garden (film), a 1977 film based on the Joanne Greenberg novel
  - I Never Promised You a Rose Garden (play), a 2004 play based on the Joanne Greenberg novel
- "(I Never Promised You a) Rose Garden", a song written by Joe South
