= Resolution =

Resolution(s) may refer to:

== Common meanings ==
- Resolution (debate), the statement debated in policy debate
- Resolution (law), a written motion adopted by a deliberative body
- New Year's resolution, a commitment that an individual makes at New Year's Day
- Dispute resolution, the settlement of a disagreement

== Science, technology, and mathematics ==
=== Mathematics and logic ===
- Resolution (algebra), an exact sequence in homological algebra
- Resolution (logic), a rule of inference used for automated theorem proving
- Standard resolution, the bar construction of resolutions in homological algebra
- Resolution of singularities in algebraic geometry

=== Measurements ===
- Resolution (audio), a measure of digital audio quality
- Resolution (electron density), the quality of an X-ray crystallography or cryo-electron microscopy data set
- Angular resolution, the capability of an optical or other sensor to discern small objects
- Depositional resolution, the age difference of fossils contained in one stratum
- Display resolution, the number of distinct pixels in each dimension that can be displayed on a display device
  - Graphic display resolutions, a list of particular display resolutions
- Distance resolution, the minimum distance that can be accurately measured
- Image resolution, a measure of the amount of detail in an image
- Optical resolution, the capability of an optical system to distinguish, find, or record details
- Printing resolution, the number of individual dots a printer can produce within a unit of distance (e.g., dots per inch)
- Sensor resolution, the smallest change a sensor can detect in the quantity that it is measuring
- Spectral resolution, the capability of an optical system to distinguish different frequencies
- Resolution of a spectrometer, the ability to distinguish two close-lying energies (or wavelengths, or frequencies, or masses)
- Resolution (chromatography), the separation of peaks in a chromatogram
- Resolution (mass spectrometry), the ability to distinguish peaks in a mass spectrum
- Spatial resolution, the pixel width on the ground
- Temporal resolution, the sampling frequency of a digital audio device
- In number storage, the resolution is the reciprocal of the unit in the last place

=== Other uses in science and technology ===
- Resolution (beam engine), an early steam engine at Coalbrookdale
- Chiral resolution, a process in stereochemistry for the separation of racemic compounds into their enantiomers
- URL resolution, a process in interpreting URLs

== Arts and entertainment ==
=== Film and television ===
- Resolution (film), a 2012 horror movie
- "Resolution" (Boardwalk Empire), a 2012 television episode
- "Resolution" (Doctor Who), a 2019 television episode
- "Resolutions" (Not Going Out), a 2020 television episode
- "Resolutions" (Star Trek: Voyager), a 1996 television episode

=== Literature and poetry ===
- Resolution (meter), the replacement of one longum with two brevia
- "Resolution", a poem by Bertolt Brecht
- Resolutions (short story), a 1911 short story by Franz Kafka
- Resolution (Parker novel), 2008, by Robert B. Parker, a Western, sequel to Appaloosa
- Resolution (Wilson novel), a 2016 work of historical fiction by A. N. Wilson
- Resolution, a 2024 novel by Irvine Welsh

=== Music ===
==== Terminology ====
- Resolution (music), the move of a note or chord from dissonance to consonance

==== Albums ====
- Resolution (38 Special album), 1997
- Resolution (BoDeans album), 2004
- Resolution (Hamiet Bluiett album), 1977
- Resolution (Hidden in Plain View album), 2007
- Resolution (Lamb of God album), 2012
- Resolution (Andy Timmons album), 2006
- Resolution (Andy Pratt album), 1976
- Resolutions (album), a 2011 album by Dave Hause
- Resolution (EP), a 2013 EP by Matt Corby

==== Songs ====
- "Resolution" (Matt Corby song), 2013
- "Resolution" (Nick Lachey song), a 2006 song by Nick Lachey from What's Left of Me
- "Resolution", a John Coltrane (1926–1967) song from A Love Supreme
- "Resolution", a Mahavishnu Orchestra song from Birds of Fire
- "Resolution", by Romantic Mode, the second opening theme for the anime After War Gundam X
- "Resolution", by Haruka Tomatsu, the first opening theme for the anime Sword Art Online: Alicization War of Underworld
- "The Resolution", a 2008 Jack's Mannequin song from The Glass Passenger

== Business and organizations ==
- Corporate resolution, a legal document defining which individuals are authorized to act on behalf of a corporation
- Resolution (talent agency), a talent agency in Los Angeles, New York, and Nashville
- Resolution Copper, a copper mining project near Superior, Arizona
- Resolution Foundation, an independent British think tank established in 2005
- Resolution Limited, a Guernsey-based investor in insurance companies
- Resolution plc, a defunct manager of in-force UK life funds acquired by Pearl Group in 2008

== Places ==
- Resolution, United States Virgin Islands
- Resolution Island (Nunavut), in the Arctic region of Canada
- Resolution Island, New Zealand, the largest (uninhabited) island in Fiordland, in the southwest of New Zealand
- Resolution Island, a fictional island in the novel Brown on Resolution
- Fort Resolution, a hamlet in the South Slave Region of the Northwest Territories, Canada

== Vessels ==
- Resolution, a Douglas DC-6 aircraft, BCPA Flight 304, which crashed near San Francisco in 1953
- Resolution (1793 ship), an American trading vessel whose crew were massacred in 1794
- HMNZS Resolution, Royal New Zealand Navy surveillance ship
- HMS Resolution, any of several British Royal Navy ships
- TIV Resolution, the world's first turbine installation vessel
- Resolution-class submarine, of the British Royal Navy
- Resolution (1802 ship), a brig built in Spain and launched in 1802
- Spanish ironclad Méndez Núñez, a Spanish Navy ship in commission as the screw frigate Resolución ("Resolution") from 1862 to 1870 prior to her conversion into a armored frigate

== See also ==
- Resolve (disambiguation)
- Resolved (disambiguation)
