= Kathleen Quinlan =

American actress (born 1954)

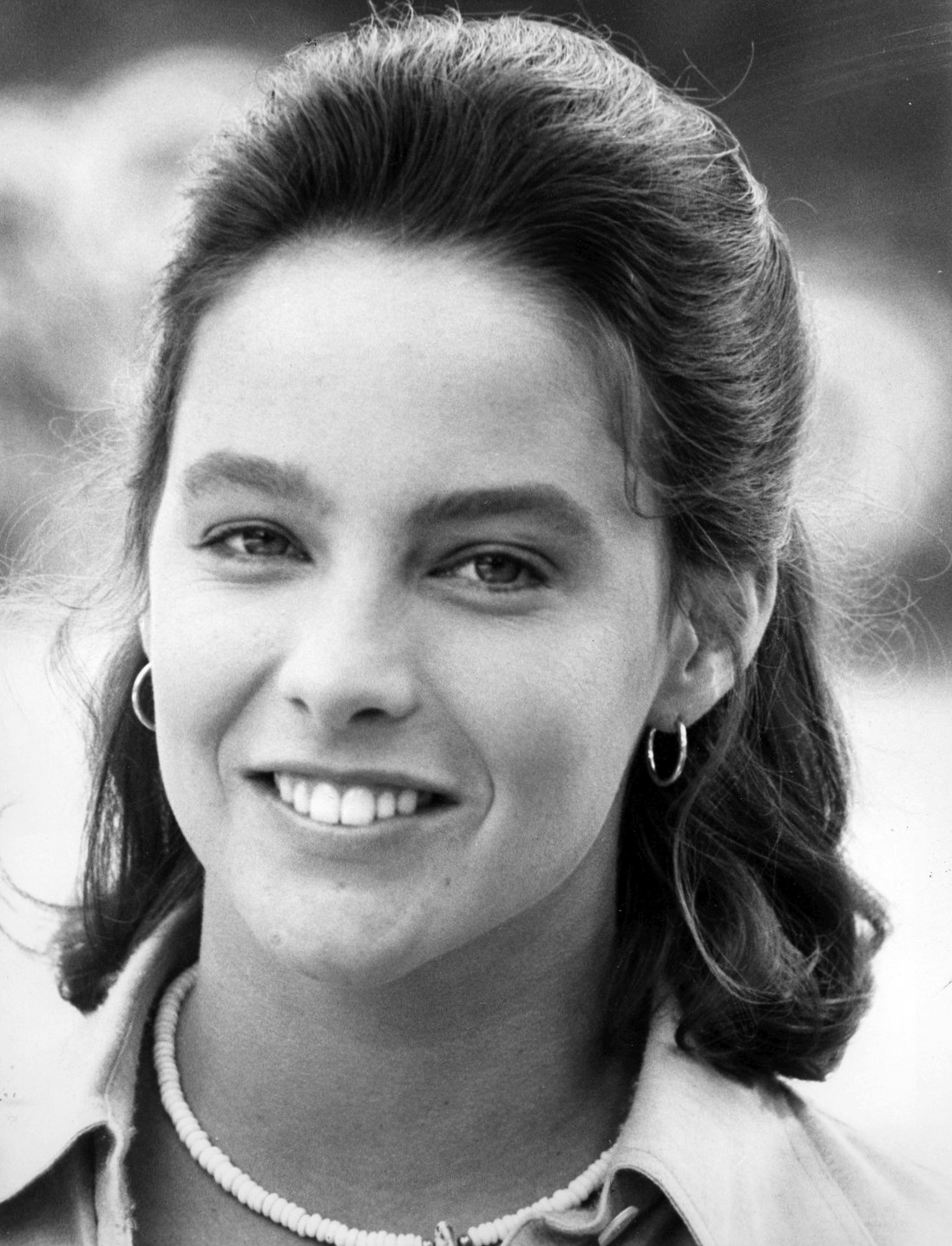
- Quinlan in 1975
- Born: Kathleen Denise Quinlan; November 19, 1954 (age 72); Pasadena, California, U.S.
- Occupation: Actress
- Years active: 1972–present
- Spouses: Warren Long (m. 1987; div. 1993) Bruce Abbott (m. 1994; div. 2022)
- Children: 1

Kathleen Denise Quinlan (born November 19, 1954) is an American film and television actress. She is best known for her performance in the 1977 film of the novel I Never Promised You a Rose Garden, and her role in the 1995 film Apollo 13, along with many roles in other feature films, television movies, and series, in a career spanning almost five decades.

== Early life and education ==
Quinlan was born on November 19, 1954, in Pasadena, California, a suburb of Los Angeles. Her mother Josephine (née Zachry) was a military supply supervisor, and her father Robert Quinlan, was a television sports director. She was raised in Mill Valley, in the San Francisco Bay Area.

== Career ==
Quinlan had an uncredited role in 1972's One Is a Lonely Number but her official credited film debut was in George Lucas's 1973 movie American Graffiti, at the age of 18.

As a young actress in the 1970s, she also had guest-starring roles in many popular television series of the day, including Police Woman, Kojak, Ironside, Emergency!, and The Waltons.

Her most celebrated roles include playing Deborah, a 16-year-old schizophrenic, in the film version of the novel I Never Promised You a Rose Garden, for which she earned a Best Actress in a Motion Picture - Drama Golden Globe nomination, and portraying Marilyn Lovell, the wife of Tom Hanks's astronaut character Jim Lovell, in the 1995 movie Apollo 13, earning her both a Best Supporting Actress – Motion Picture Golden Globe nomination and a Best Supporting Actress Academy Award nomination.

Quinlan also appeared in feature films such as Lifeguard (1976), Airport '77 (1977), The Promise (1979), The Runner Stumbles (1979), Sunday Lovers (1980), Twilight Zone: The Movie (1983), Warning Sign (1985) Sunset (1988), Clara's Heart (1988), and Trial by Jury (1994). She featured in numerous TV movies as well, including Little Ladies of the Night (1977), She's in the Army Now (1981), Blackout (1985), Trapped (1989), Strays (1991), Last Light (1993), the adaptation of the novel In the Lake of the Woods (1996), Blessings (2003), and more. She played Jim Morrison's Celtic pagan consort Patricia Kennealy-Morrison in Oliver Stone's The Doors. In 1997, she appeared in Event Horizon (1997) and won a Blockbuster Entertainment Award as Favorite Supporting Actress-Suspense for Breakdown (1997), playing Kurt Russell's character's kidnapped wife.

She had a main role for three seasons on the series Family Law, along with recurring roles as the mother of the two brothers on Prison Break, and in Chicago Fire and Blue. She was in two episodes of Alfred Hitchcock Presents, plus episodes of many other shows, such as Diagnosis: Murder, Glee, The Event, and House. She appeared in the 2006 remake of the horror classic The Hills Have Eyes, the 2007 film Breach, and the 2008 film Made of Honor, and played a senator in "Alliances", a 2011 episode of the science-fiction series Stargate Universe.

As of 2022, Quinlan's recent work includes a 2019 episode of How to Get Away with Murder, a lead role in the film Walking with Herb, filmed in 2018 and released in 2021, and a part in the horror flick The Stairs.

== Personal life ==
In his 2024 memoir Sonny Boy, Al Pacino describes his relationship with Quinlan around 1983 when he was making the film Scarface.

She was married to artist Warren Long in 1987. They divorced in 1993. She met actor Bruce Abbott, who was married to actress Linda Hamilton at the time, on the TV movie Trapped (1989) and they married on April 12, 1994. They divorced December 24, 2022. They remain good friends, and have one son, Tyler, who was born in 1990.

== Filmography ==
=== Film ===
Year	Title	Role	Notes
1973	American Graffiti	Peg	
1975	The Abduction of Saint Anne	Anne Benedict	
1976	Lifeguard	Wendy	
1977	Airport '77	Julie	
1977	I Never Promised You a Rose Garden	Deborah Blake	
1979	The Promise	Nancy McAllister / Marie Adamson	
1979	The Runner Stumbles	Sister Rita	
1980	Sunday Lovers	Laurie	Segment: "Skippy"
1982	Hanky Panky	Janet Dunn	
1983	Independence Day	Mary Ann Taylor	
1983	Twilight Zone: The Movie	Helen Foley	Segment: "It's a Good Life"
1984	Last Winter	Joyce	
1985	Warning Sign	Joanie Morse	
1987	Wild Thing	Jane	
1987	Man Outside	Grace Freemont	
1988	Sunset	Nancy Shoemaker	
1988	Clara's Heart	Leona Hart	
1991	The Doors	Patricia Kennealy	
1994	Trial by Jury	Wanda	
1995	Apollo 13	Marilyn Lovell	
1995	Perfect Alibi	Melanie Bauers	
1997	Zeus and Roxanne	Mary Beth Dunhill	
1997	Breakdown	Amy Taylor	
1997	Event Horizon	Peters	
1997	Lawn Dogs	Clare Stockard	
1998	My Giant	Serena Kamin	
1998	A Civil Action	Anne Anderson	
2003	The Battle of Shaker Heights	Eve Ernswiler	
2004	El Padrino	Judge Scorsi	
2006	Harm's Way	Bea	
2006	The Hills Have Eyes	Ethel Carter	
2007	American Fork	Agnes Orbison	
2007	Breach	Bonnie Hanssen	
2008	The Dissection of Thanksgiving	Carol	
2008	Made of Honor	Joan	
2009	Adult Film: A Hollywood Tale	Mary Bernstein	
2010	Elektra Luxx	Rebecca Linbrook	
2010	The River Why	Ma	
2010	Eagles in the Chicken Coop	Mary Bernstein	
2012	Life's an Itch	Audrey	
2013	Horns	Lydia Perrish	
2014	After	Nora Valentino	
2017	Elizabeth Blue	Carol	
2017	ADDicted	Kate Dawson	
2018	Chimera Strain	Masterson	
2018	Parallel	Marissa	
2019	The Devil Has a Name	Nancy	
2021	The Stairs	Grandma Bernice Martin	
2021	Walking with Herb	Sheila Amable-Amo	
2024	Horizon: An American Saga – Chapter 2	Annie Pine	
TBA	Horizon: An American Saga – Chapter 3	Annie Pine	Filming

=== Television ===
Year	Title	Role	Notes
1973	Emergency!	Janet	"Understanding"
1974	Harry O	Sharon	"Guardian at the Gates"
1974	Owen Marshall: Counselor at Law	Jill	"House of Friends"
1974	Can Ellen Be Saved	Melissa	ABC Movie of the Week
1974	Police Woman	Debbie Sweet	"The Beautiful Die Young"
1974	Kojak	Janet Conforti	"Hush Now, Don't You Die"
1974	Where Have All the People Gone?	Deborah Anders	TV film
1974	Lucas Tanner	Joyce Howell	"Lucas Tanner", "Three Letter Word"
1974	Ironside	Peggy Lynch	"Run Scared"
1974–1976	The Waltons	Selina Linville	"The Thoroughbred", "The Collision"
1975	The Missing Are Deadly	Michelle	TV film
1975	The Abduction of Saint Anne	Anne Benedict	TV film
1975	The Turning Point of Jim Malloy	Edith Evans	TV film
1975	Switch	Robin Morgan	"The Deadly Missiles Caper"
1977	Little Ladies of the Night	Karen Brodwick	TV film
1981	She's in the Army Now	Pvt. Cass Donner	TV film
1984	When She Says No	Rose Michaels	TV film
1985	Blackout	Chris Graham	TV film
1985	Children of the Night	Lois Lee	TV film
1986	Alfred Hitchcock Presents	Ann Foley	"The Canary Sedan"
1987	Dreams Lost, Dreams Found	Sarah McAllister	TV film
1988	Alfred Hitchcock Presents	Karen Wilson	"Fogbound"
1989	Trapped	Mary Ann Marshall	TV film
1990	The Operation	Ginnie	TV film
1991	Strays	Lindsey Jarrett	TV film
1992	An American Story	Hope Tyler	TV film
1993	Stolen Babies	Bekka	TV film
1993	Tribeca	Karen	"Heros Exoletus"
1993	Last Light	Kathy Rubicek	TV film
1993	The Hidden Room	Julia	"Refuge"
1995	Picture Windows	Hooker	"Lightning"
1996	In the Lake of the Woods	Kathy Waylan	TV film
1999	Too Rich: The Secret Life of Doris Duke	Nanaline Duke	TV film
1999	Diagnosis: Murder	Dr. Kate Delieb	"Today Is the Last Day of the Rest of My Life"
1999–2002	Family Law	Lynn Holt	Main role
2003	Blessings	Meredith Blessing	TV film
2004	Perfect Romance	Tess Kelly	TV film
2004	The Riverman	Sande Keppel	TV film
2004	The Dead Will Tell	Beth Hytner	TV film
2006	House	Arlene McNeil	"Meaning"
2007	CSI: Crime Scene Investigation	Barbara Tallman	"Monster in the Box"
2008–2009	Prison Break	Christina Rose Scofield	Recurring role (season 4)
2009	Empire State	Colleen Cochrane	TV film
2010	The Event	Erika Jarvis	"Your World to Take", "Everything Will Change"
2011	Stargate Universe	Sen. Michaels	"Alliances"
2011	Cinema Verite	Mary	TV film
2011	Glee	Dr. Shane	"Born This Way"
2012–2013	Chicago Fire	Nancy Casey	Recurring role
2012–2014	Blue	Jessica	Recurring role
2015	How Not to Propose	Susan	TV film
2018–2019	Marvel's Runaways	Susan Ellerh	3 episodes
2018	Saving My Baby	Virginia	TV film
2019	How to Get Away with Murder	Britt	"Say Goodbye"
2023	Mayans M.C.	Mrs. Buksar	3 episodes

== Awards and nominations ==
Year	Award	Category	Nominee	Result	Ref.
1978	Golden Globes	Golden Globe Award for Best Actress in a Motion Picture – Drama	Kathleen Quinlan	Nominated	
1985	MystFest	Best Actress	Kathleen Quinlan	Won	
1995	Awards Circuit Community Awards	Best Actress in a Supporting Role	Kathleen Quinlan	Nominated	
1995	Awards Circuit Community Awards	Best Cast Ensemble	Apollo 13	Nominated	
1995	Chicago Film Critics Awards	Best Supporting Actress	Kathleen Quinlan	Nominated	
1996	Academy Award	Best Supporting Actress	Kathleen Quinlan	Nominated	
1996	Golden Globes	Best Supporting Actress – Motion Picture	Kathleen Quinlan	Nominated	
1996	Dallas–Fort Worth Film Critics Association Awards	Best Supporting Actress	Kathleen Quinlan	Nominated	
1996	Screen Actors Guild Awards	Outstanding Performance by a Cast in a Motion Picture	Apollo 13	Won (Note: Shared with Kevin Bacon, Tom Hanks, Ed Harris, Bill Paxton, and Gary Sinise.)	
1998	Blockbuster Entertainment Award	Favorite Supporting Actress – Suspense	Kathleen Quinlan	Won	
2000	OFTA Television Award	Best Actress in a New Drama Series	Kathleen Quinlan	Nominated	
2016	20/20 Awards	Best Supporting Actress from 1995	Kathleen Quinlan	Nominated	
2018	FilmQuest Cthulhu Awards	Best Supporting Actress – Feature	Kathleen Quinlan	Won (Note: Tied with Suzanne Voss.)	
2018	Screamfest NOLA Awards	Best Supporting Role	Kathleen Quinlan	Won	
2020	European Cinematography Awards	Best Actress	Kathleen Quinlan	Won	
