= Resolving power =

Resolving power is the capacity of an instrument to resolve two points which are close together.

Specifically, resolving power may refer to:

- Angular resolution
- Spectral resolution
- Optical resolution
- Resolution (mass spectrometry)

== See also ==
- Resolution (disambiguation)
