= Resolved =

Resolved may refer to:

- Resolved (film), a 2007 documentary
- Resolved White (c. 1615-after 1687), a child passenger on the Mayflower

== See also ==
- Resolve (disambiguation)
- Resolution (disambiguation)
