= My Name Is Legion (novel) =

2004 novel by A. N. Wilson

- First edition (publ. Hutchinson)
- Author: A. N. Wilson
- Language: English
- Publisher: Hutchinson
- Publication date: 2004
- Publication place: United Kingdom
- ISBN: 9780091795351
- Dewey Decimal: 823/.914
- LC Class: PR6073.I439 M9

My Name Is Legion is a novel by A. N. Wilson first published in 2004. Set in London in the first years of the 21st century, the book revolves around two main topics: Britain's gutter press and Christian religion. On the one hand, the novel satirises the detrimental influence yellow journalism can have on individuals, society and politics both domestic and international. On the other hand, My Name Is Legion discusses the churches' role in contemporary civil society, of faith in a secularised world, and of evil as an undeniable force in our lives—why it exists (leading to the theological question of theodicy) and what believers can actively do to make the world a better place to live.

== Plot introduction ==
In the novel, a mentally disturbed teenager who might be suffering from schizophrenia (or rather dissociative identity disorder, as the illness is never diagnosed) behaves as if he were possessed by demons. Also, the fictional tabloid whose proprietor and staff are described in the book is called The Daily Legion.

=== Explanation of the novel's title ===
"My name is Legion" is a quotation from the Gospel according to Mark. In Chapter 5, we are told that Jesus and his disciples encounter a man possessed by a multitude of demons. On seeing Jesus approaching, the afflicted man

ran and worshipped him, And cried with a loud voice, and said, What have I to do with thee, Jesus, thou Son of the most high God? I adjure thee by God, that thou torment me not. For he said unto him, Come out of the man, thou unclean spirit. And he asked him, What is thy name? And he answered, saying, My name is Legion: for we are many (Mark 5:6–9).

== Plot summary ==
At 16, Peter d'Abo is an elusive boy. He seldom stays at his mother's place, but his grandmother, Lily d'Abo, in whose flat he is supposed to live for the time being, does not see him regularly either. From time to time Peter visits Father Vivyan and on such occasions even serves as an altar boy. When, on the social worker's advice, his mother tells him that Lennox Mark is his natural father, Peter decides to get some money out of him his way. One night while Lennox Mark is not at home he poses as a delivery boy and gains entrance into the Marks' private home. However, he is overwhelmed by Martina Mark and her mother, who is also living there, and persuaded to stay and work for them as a servant. As the two women have his DNA and he does not want to be arrested, he accepts their offer.

While on the streets of London, Peter starts committing crime. He steals a miniature recording device from the Marks' home; he steals Rachel Pearl's expensive watch when she comes to live at Crickleden; but he also turns violent, cutting off a man's testicles because he was looking for a homosexual encounter; and pushing Kevin Currey in front of an underground train.

Meanwhile, Lennox Mark is planning General Bindiga's state visit in London—he has already arranged the details with the Prime Minister and convinced him that Bindiga is an honourable state leader—to coincide with his elevation to Lord Mark of Lower Pool. To suppress opposition to the state visit which might be headed by Father Vivyan, The Daily Legion launches a campaign against the priest, alleging that he has a history as a child molester and releasing a doctored version of a secretly recorded conversation between Peter and Father Vivyan as evidence. Vivyan is suspended from the parish, his reputation as a 20th-century saint is immediately destroyed, and ardent devotees such as Lily d'Abo, believing everything the papers say, are devastated. When she is approached by The Daily Legion, Lily d'Abo succumbs to the lure of money and signs an exclusive contract for £10,000, realising only afterwards that in no way will she be able to help her grandson with the money.

Unaware of how dangerous Peter is, Rachel Pearl goes in search of the boy in an attempt to make him talk and clear Father Vivyan of the allegations. Following a hint from someone in the street, she walks to a nearby cemetery, finds Peter in an old mausoleum but is immediately taken captive by him. Several people have already been alerted to the fact that Peter may have a hostage, and the place is surrounded by police. However, Father Vivyan is there first and shoots Peter between the eyes. Vivyan is fatally wounded by a bullet himself and brought to a monastery to die there.

At about the same time—it is the day of General Bindiga's state visit—a bomb goes off in a posh London hotel killing Bindiga and injuring two of his women, while another device, planted in the offices of The Daily Legion, is defused before it can explode. Three months later, Lord Mark dies of a massive heart attack.

== The main characters ==
The central character of My Name Is Legion is Peter d'Abo, a black youth from (the fictitious area of) Crickleden in South London. 16 years of age, he is the illegitimate son of Mercy Topling, an office worker who, due to her then promiscuous lifestyle, honestly cannot say who Peter's father is—either one of a number of journalists from The Daily Legion where she was employed when she became pregnant in 1985, or Lennox Mark himself, the proprietor of that paper. However, it could also be Father Vivyan Chell, an Anglican monk who lived and worked in Africa but with whom she had a spontaneous and illicit sexual encounter while he was visiting her parish church in Crickleden. Now married with two younger boys, who do not get along with their older brother, Mercy Topling senses that her son Peter, who has been playing truant of late, is not well and may even be dangerous to others but does not do much about it except consult Kevin Currey, the local social worker. While Mercy sees in him "an accepter of human incurability", Currey is in fact a paedophile who has encouraged Peter to have sex with him and thus contributed to the boy's downfall.

Lennox Mark, the owner of The Daily Legion, was brought up in the (fictitious) African country of Zinariya, where he got to know, and was taught to distinguish right from wrong, by Father Vivyan, a man 15 years his senior. Although he had discovered his spirituality there, after moving to England and taking over The Daily Legion, Mark's faith was superseded by greed, gluttony, and other signs of a thoroughly capitalistic view of the world. His wealth is based on the exploitation of the native Zinariyans who work in the local copper mines. Having forged a successful alliance with General Bindiga, the dictator of Zinariya, and publicly supporting him through his paper in spite of blatant human rights violations in that country, Mark has seemingly stopped listening to his conscience altogether. Now in his mid-fifties, his only ambition is a peerage: He wants "nothing more than to drape himself with dead animal skins and […] make obeisance to his tribal chieftainess".

Mark's wife Martina is a former East German prostitute now, after rewriting her own biography, posing as the daughter of a Swiss surgeon who, during the Second World War, helped the victims of Nazi Germany without taking money for it. Her perpetual smile is due to the umpteenth facelift she has recently had. Like her best friend Mary Much, Martina Mark works as a columnist for The Daily Legion and is generally said to pull the strings in her husband's life.

The other people working for Lennox Mark are a motley crew at various stages of disillusionment and self-loathing. For example, 28-year-old Rachel Pearl, an intellectual and well educated young woman, did not mind, when she was still at university, becoming the lover of a much older journalist and getting a well-paid job through his connections. Now, eight years later, she realises that for almost a decade she has been no more than that man's whore, living in an expensive flat paid for from his expense account and providing him with a beautiful body whenever he feels the lust to have her rather than his wife or a prostitute. When, on the death of her former schoolmate and socialite Kitty Chell, Rachel realises the sheer amount of manipulation going on in the media—Kitty died of natural causes in the first stages of pregnancy, but The Daily Legion turns it into a scandalous drug-related death—she quits both her job and her lover and benefactor. Unable, as an atheist, to turn to God or an official church for consolation or advice, she is nevertheless drawn towards Father Vivyan, Kitty's uncle.

Father Vivyan comes from an aristocratic British family, his brother being the Earl of Longmore. As a young man he joined the army and fought in Zinariya, but his conversion was complete, he became a monk and went back to Africa to live and work there for almost 40 years. Now in his late sixties, he is assigned to take over the parish church in Crickleden, and he immediately introduces important changes. He turns the vicarage into an open house—literally, by removing the lock on the front door—and caters for the homeless as well as asylum seekers. As a radical follower of Jesus Christ, he advocates absolute poverty and does not have any personal belongings himself except a few books, among them his favourites, Bonhoeffer's Ethik and works by Simone Weil. Like Bonhoeffer, Vivyan has been pondering the question of whether it is ethically justifiable, and a fulfilment of God's plan, to use violence against those in power who are evil—whether they are a British newspaper tycoon or an African dictator butchering his own people. As it happens, some of the shadier figures looming in and around his Crickleden headquarters have built a secret arsenal and are training to use the weapons.

Father Vivyan's guilty secret, however, is his voracious appetite for sex, which has made him lead a double life as a monk, "while actually being the lover of dozens of women," an appetite which, in retrospect, makes Mercy Topling call him "a randy old goat who just LOVED sex".

== Quotations ==
- Father Vivyan to Rachel Pearl on good and evil:

Maybe our forebears felt by instinct that there were gods or that there was one true God. This instinct formed itself into religion, or several religions. […] Those deep instincts that goodness is not something we invented for ourselves, that it is there independent of our ability to attain it, irrespective of how many people deny it. You could have the whole Third Reich with all its power and all its deadly attractiveness designed to tell you that it was a good thing to send a child to a gas oven; but every single person on this planet would know that it was evil. That's what makes me hold on. We did not invent the rules. (Part Two, Chapter Twenty)

- Father Vivyan and Lennox Mark on the welfare state:

"When I left this country, the best part of forty years ago, England still seemed to have a soul. It had pulled together after the war and committed itself to a welfare system …"
"Jesus, it was the welfare system which drained this fucking country of its soul—can't you see that? The dependency culture destroyed any sense of having to do something for yourself. Do you think those violent, criminal bastards in your parish would have time to be muggers if they had ever been made to work?" (Part One, Chapter Ten)
