= The President's Mistress =

- DVD cover
- Genre: Drama; Mystery; Thriller
- Based on: The President's Mistress by Patrick Anderson
- Written by: Tom Lazarus
- Directed by: John Llewellyn Moxey
- Starring: Beau Bridges; Karen Grassle; Susan Blanchard; Larry Hagman
- Music by: Lalo Schifrin
- Country of origin: United States
- Original language: English

Production
- Executive producer: Stephen Friedman
- Producer: Herbert Hirschman
- Production location: Washington, D.C.
- Cinematography: Robert L. Morrison
- Editor: John A. Martinelli
- Running time: 94 minutes
- Production company: Stephen Friedman/Kings Road Production

Original release
- Network: CBS
- Release: February 10, 1978

The President's Mistress is a 1978 American made-for-television drama mystery film produced by Kings Road Entertainment and starring Beau Bridges, Karen Grassle, Susan Blanchard and Larry Hagman.

== Plot ==
Donna Morton has been having an affair with the President of the United States for several months, regularly meeting with him for assignations in a safe house in Washington, D.C. She is always picked up in a car by a Secret Service agent.

In Moscow, a US agent in the Kremlin manages to get hold of a secret document identifying Donna Morton as a KGB agent sent to spy on the president. This document is passed back to Washington, where it comes into the possession of the CSA (a thinly disguised version of the CIA). They begin to put Donna Morton under surveillance.

The same day, her brother Ben Morton – a Washington businessman and occasional courier for the CSA – arrives back in the city. On the plane, he meets and romances Mugsy Evans. When Donna Morton is found dead in her apartment moments before she was due to be picked up by her Secret Service driver, he begins to investigate.

He discovers her affair with the president, and through his contacts with the Secret Service, he discovers a CSA agent was seen leaving her apartment building around the time of her death. The Secret Service agent who regularly drove Donna informs him that the CSA were there, but before any more information can be passed on, she is killed.

Realizing now that the CSA had played a large role in her death, Ben Morton confronts the head of the CSA, who tells him it was the Soviets who killed her, and that she was a Soviet agent. He explains that the man who probably performed the deed was the head KGB agent in Washington, Anatoly.

Anatoly is the Soviet Naval Attaché whom he interrogates at gunpoint in the car. He tells him everything he knows – that the classified document identifying Donna Morton as a Soviet agent was a fake, designed to throw the CSA off balance, and had been intended to fall into American hands. The KGB had thus hoped to destabilize the White House during crucial talks with China.

== Cast ==
- Beau Bridges - Ben Morton
- Karen Grassle - Donna Morton
- Larry Hagman - Ed Murphy
- Joel Fabiani - Jim Gilkrest
- Susan Blanchard - Margaret 'Mugsy' Evans
