= Martina Deignan =

American actress

- Born: East Orange, New Jersey, U.S.
- Occupation: Television actress

Martina Deignan is an American actress. She played Jackie Parks on NBC's soap opera Santa Barbara from January to May 1985.

== Early years ==
Deignan was born in East Orange, New Jersey. She attended Loyola University, where she studied acting, after which she studied at the Royal Academy of Dramatic Arts in London.

== Career ==
Deignan performed in off-off-Broadway plays. Prior to joining Santa Barbara, Martina had a starring role as the fifth Dr. Annie Stewart Ward on As the World Turns from 1976 to 1979.

In 1981–1982, Deignan starred in Code Red as Haley Green, a young female firefighter in the Los Angeles City Fire Department. The show lasted one season. She was also featured in the 1990 film Ghost, portraying Rose, secretary to Patrick Swayze's character.

== Filmography ==
=== Film ===
Year	Title	Role	Notes
1974	And Baby Makes Three	Janet Lang	
1980	The Long Riders	Shirley Biggs	
1980	Island Claws	Lynn	
1985	Blackout	Pauline	
1990	Ghost	Rose	

=== Television ===
Year	Title	Role	Notes
1978	As the World Turns	Annie Spencer	Episode dated 19 September 1978
1979	A Man Called Sloane	Barbara Wilson	Episode: "Collision Course"
1980	Dallas	Debra Johns	Episode: "Paternity Suit"
1981	Madame X	Elizabeth Reeves	Television film
1981–1982	Code Red	Haley Green	18 episodes
1982	Prime Suspect	Ursular	Television film
1983	American Playhouse	Betty	Episode: "Miss Lonelyhearts"
1983	Casablanca	Liz Grant	Episode: "Master Builder's Woman"
1985	Santa Barbara	Jackie Parks	37 episodes
1993	Law & Order	Sonja Hughes	Episode: "Animal Instinct"
