= A. N. Wilson =

English writer and newspaper columnist (born 1950)

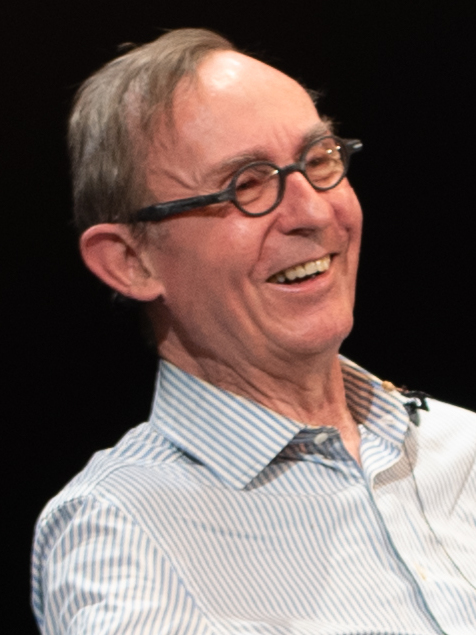
- Wilson in 2023
- Born: Andrew Norman Wilson; 27 October 1950 (age 76); Stone, Staffordshire, England
- Education: New College, Oxford
- Occupation: Writer
- Spouses: Katherine Duncan-Jones (m. 1971; div. 1990); Ruth Guilding
- Children: 3, including Emily and Bee

Andrew Norman Wilson (born 27 October 1950) is an English writer and newspaper columnist known for his critical biographies, novels and works of popular history. He has written more than 30 books of non-fiction and more than 20 works of fiction. He is an occasional columnist for the Daily Mail, and a former columnist and literary editor for the London Evening Standard. He has been an occasional contributor to The Times Literary Supplement, New Statesman, The Spectator and The Observer.

== Early life and education ==
Wilson was born on 27 October 1950 in Stone, Staffordshire. His father became the managing director of Wedgwood, the pottery company.

He was first educated at the independent Catholic day school, St Dominic's Priory School, Stone before moving to Hillstone School (subsequently incorporated into Malvern College) in Great Malvern, Worcestershire, and then at Rugby School from the age of 13, where he read Mao and Marx in his spare time. While at Rugby, he wrote an article for the school magazine arguing that public schools should be abolished. The national press became interested in the story, with the Daily Express headlining its account "Red rebel in Tom Brown's school". "Reporters arrived at the school gates, wanting to interview me, but my housemaster, wisely, would not let me talk to them", Wilson told Hunter Davies in 1993.

Wilson went to New College, Oxford, graduating in 1972. He had originally entered St Stephen's House, Oxford, a Church of England seminary, with the intention of being ordained as a priest, but left the college after only one year of study, and five years after graduation published the novel Unguarded Hours (1978) based upon his experiences at the seminary and his perception of its homoerotic atmosphere.

Wilson taught English at Merchant Taylors' School, Northwood, for two years and then spent seven years as a lecturer in medieval literature at St Hugh's College and New College, Oxford.

== Publications ==
A prolific journalist and author of nonfiction, Wilson has also written over 20 works of fiction, for which he has won the Somerset Maugham Prize and the John Llewellyn Rhys Prize. His novels also include such historical works as The Potter's Hand (a study of the family life of Josiah Wedgwood), Resolution, a fictional account of Captain James Cook's second voyage, and Scandal, about the Profumo affair. His 2007 novel Winnie and Wolf, about the relationship between Adolf Hitler and Richard Wagner's English daughter-in-law Winifred, was long-listed for the Man Booker Prize. Novels set in the present include The Vicar of Sorrows (1993), about a clergyman who has lost his faith dealing with the death of his mother, and Dream Children (1998), about paedophilia.

In the early 1990s, in the wake of the fatwa on Salman Rushdie and the continuing troubles in Northern Ireland, Wilson published a pamphlet, Against Religion, in the Chatto & Windus CounterBlasts series. He wrote biographies of Jesus and St Paul as well as a history of atheism in the 19th century titled God's Funeral, describing its growth as due to influences ranging from David Hume to Sigmund Freud. These and many other of his books, such as those on Leo Tolstoy (Whitbread Award for best biography of 1988), C. S. Lewis and Hilaire Belloc, are simultaneously sympathetic to religious belief and critical of it.

In August 2006, Wilson's biography of Sir John Betjeman was published. It was then discovered that he had been the victim of a hoax perpetrated by Betjeman's disgruntled biographer Bevis Hillier. Wilson had included in the book a letter (to Anglo-Irish writer Honor Tracy), purportedly by Betjeman, detailing a previously unknown love affair. Wilson acknowledged the letter to be a fiction when it was pointed out that it contained an acrostic spelling out an insulting message to him: "AN Wilson is a shit".

In 2001, Wilson published Dante in Love, a study of the Italian poet Dante Alighieri as an artist and philosopher, also portraying medieval Florence in depth to help readers understand the literary and cultural background of The Divine Comedy.

In addition to his biographies, Wilson has written four books covering entire eras, The Victorians (2002), After the Victorians (2005), Our Times (2008), and The Elizabethans (2011).

=== Critiques of Wilson's work ===
Lynn Barber of The Daily Telegraph wrote that "Wilson's forte is the character and he brilliantly conveys Betjeman's odd mixture of introspection and sociability, gaiety and melancholia, exhibition and self-disgust". In The Times (London), James Marriott called Wilson's book Resolution "a work of genius". Kathryn Hughes wrote in The Guardian of Wilson's biography of Queen Victoria, Victoria: A Life, "Subtle, thoughtful ... a shimmering and rather wonderful biography." Daisy Goodwin in The Sunday Times review wrote: "This won't be the last biography of Victoria but it is certainly the most interesting and original in a long time."

In a review in the New Statesman, the historian Richard J. Evans criticised Wilson's Hitler: A Short Biography for inaccuracies, lack of original research and analysis, and Wilson's personal biases. In his review of The Laird of Abbotsford for Cencrastus, David McKie wrote: "Concluding with Chesterton that the superficial impression of the world is by far the deepest, Wilson underpins his notions of Scott with the same paradoxical hope."

Wilson's biography Charles Darwin, Victorian Mythmaker (2017), was criticised by John van Wyhe in New Scientist for confusing Darwin's theory of natural selection with Lamarckism at one point, as well as other scientific, historical and editorial errors. Kathryn Hughes in The Guardian called it a "cheap attempt to ruffle feathers", with a dubious grasp of science and attempted character assassination. In the Evening Standard, Adrian Woolfson wrote that "while for the greater part a lucid, elegantly written and thought-provoking social and intellectual history", Wilson's "speculations on evolutionary theory" produce a book that is "fatally flawed, mischievous, and ultimately misleading". Steve Jones, an emeritus professor of genetics of University College London, commented in The Sunday Times: "In the classic mould of the contrarian, he despises anything said by mainstream biology in favour of marginal and sometimes preposterous theories." The geneticist and former editor of Nature, Adam Rutherford, called the book "deranged" and said Wilson "would fail GCSE biology catastrophically."

== Personal life ==
Wilson married the Shakespearean scholar Katherine Duncan-Jones in 1971, before his graduation. They had two daughters, Emily Wilson (born 1971) and Beatrice "Bee" Wilson (born 1974), and divorced in 1990. As of 1993, he was married to the art historian Ruth Guilding, with whom he has a third daughter, the painter Georgina "Georg" Wilson.

== Bibliography ==
=== Books ===
==== Non-fiction ====
- The Laird of Abbotsford: A View of Sir Walter Scott (1980)
- The Life of John Milton: A Biography (1983)
- Hilaire Belloc: A Biography (1985)
- How Can We Know? (1985)
- Penfriends from Porlock (1988)
- Tolstoy: A Biography (1988)
- C. S. Lewis: A Biography (1990)
- Against Religion: Why We Should Live Without It (1991)
- Jesus: A Life (1992)
- The Faber Book of Church and Clergy (editor) (1992)
- The Rise and Fall of the House of Windsor (1993)
- Paul: The Mind of the Apostle (1997)
- God's Funeral: The Decline of Faith in Western Civilization (1999)
- The Victorians (2002)
- Iris Murdoch As I Knew Her (2003)
- London: A Short History (2004)
- After the Victorians (2005)
- Betjeman (2006)
- Literary Genius: 25 Classic Writers Who Define English & American Literature (2007, illustrated by Barry Moser)
- Our Times (2008)
- Dante in Love (2011)
- The Elizabethans (2011)
- Hitler: A Short Biography (2011)
- Victoria: A Life (2014)
- The Book of the People: How to Read the Bible (2015)
- The Queen: The Life and Family of Queen Elizabeth II (2016)
- Charles Darwin, Victorian Mythmaker (2017)
- Prince Albert: The Man Who Saved the Monarchy (2019)
- The Mystery of Charles Dickens (2020)
- The King and the Christmas Tree (2021)
- Confessions: A Life of Failed Promises (2022): autobiography
- Lilibet: The Girl Who Would be Queen (2022)
- Goethe: His Faustian Life - The Extraordinary Story of Modern Germany, a Troubled Genius and the Poem that Made Our World (2024)

==== Fiction ====
- The Sweets of Pimlico (1977)
- Unguarded Hours (1978)
- Kindly Light (1979)
- The Healing Art (1980)
- Who Was Oswald Fish? (1981)
- Wise Virgin (1982)
- Scandal (1983)
- Gentlemen in England (1983)
- Love Unknown (1986)
- Stray (1987)
- The Vicar of Sorrows (1993)
- The Tabitha Stories (1997)
- Dream Children (1998)
- My Name Is Legion (2004)
- A Jealous Ghost (2005)
- Winnie and Wolf (2007, long-listed for the 2007 Man Booker Prize) – fictional account of the relationship between Adolf Hitler and Winifred Wagner
- The Potter's Hand (2012)
- Resolution (2016)
- Aftershocks (2018)

The Lampitt Chronicles

- Incline Our Hearts (1988)
- A Bottle in the Smoke (1990)
- Daughters of Albion (1991)
- Hearing Voices (1995)
- A Watch in the Night (1996)

=== Critical studies and reviews of Wilson's work ===
The Laird of Abbotsford

- McKie, David (1980), A View from Above, Cencrastus No. 4, Winter 1980−81, p. 39

== Broadcasting ==
Title	Synopsis	Broadcast	Broadcaster
The Genius of Josiah Wedgwood	Wilson explores the life of his great hero, Josiah Wedgwood. As one of the founding fathers of the Industrial Revolution, Wedgwood was a self-made, self-educated creative giant, whose other achievements might be better known if he were not so celebrated for his pottery.	19 April 2013	BBC
Narnia's Lost Poet: The Secret Lives and Loves of C. S. Lewis	Wilson, a biographer of Lewis, goes in search of the man behind Narnia – bestselling children's author, famous Christian writer, Oxford academic and an aspiring poet who never achieved the same success in writing verse as he did prose.	27 November 2013	BBC
Return to Betjemanland	Wilson travels to a landscape of beautiful houses and churches, beaches and seaside piers, where he examines the life and work of the poet and broadcaster Sir John Betjeman.	1 September 2014	BBC
Queen Victoria's Letters: A Monarch Unveiled	Wilson explores the personal life of Queen Victoria through her journals and letters in this psychological portrait of Britain's second longest reigning monarch.	13 November 2014; 20 November 2014	BBC
Return to Larkinland	Wilson revisits the life and works of the poet Philip Larkin.	Last shown 9 August 2022	BBC
Return to Eliotland	Wilson revisits the life and works of the poet T. S. Eliot.	8 October 2018	BBC
