= Blessings (film) =

- Genre: Drama
- Based on: Blessings by Anna Quindlen
- Screenplay by: Joyce Eliason
- Directed by: Arvin Brown
- Starring: Mary Tyler Moore; Liam Waite; China Chow; Kathleen Quinlan
- Theme music composer: Roger Bellon
- Country of origin: United States
- Original language: English

Production
- Executive producer: Larry Sanitsky
- Producer: Sherri Saito
- Production locations: Toronto, Halifax
- Cinematography: Thom Best
- Editor: Scot J. Kelly
- Running time: 120 min.
- Production companies: Carlton America; Sanitsky Company

Original release
- Network: CBS
- Release: October 5, 2003

Blessings is a 2003 American made-for-television drama film directed by Arvin Brown. Based on the 2002 novel of the same name by Anna Quindlen, the film stars Mary Tyler Moore and Liam Waite.

== Plot ==
Lydia Blessing (Mary Tyler Moore) is an 82-year-old heiress of wealthy background who, since the death of her husband decades earlier, has been living as a bitter and reclusive widow at her mansion called 'Blessings'. Meanwhile, a man named Skip Cuddy (Liam Waite) has just been released on parole from county jail following an armed robbery gone wrong, only to find his girlfriend Shelley (Laura Regan) cheating on him with an old friend, Chris (Joris Jarsky). Deciding to abandon his old customs, Skip accepts an offer to work for Lydia at her mansion. Lydia's personal maid Jennifer (China Chow) is aware of Skip's mistakes in the past, and warns him not to betray Lydia, as does her daughter Meredith (Kathleen Quinlan).

One night, a couple unfit of parenthood leaves a baby at the garage of Lydia's estate. Skip finds the baby and takes care of her, while working long shifts at Lydia's, at which he is mostly criticized by Jennifer due to his affiliation with gangs in the past. When Lydia finds out about the baby, she wants to give it up for child services, but Skip is able to convince her that a foster family is not a good resolution by sharing experiences from his childhood. Lydia agrees to raise the baby with him, naming her Faith and keeping her existence a secret from Jennifer, and quickly bonds with the child. She notices how great Skip is with the care of Faith, and once she tells Jennifer the truth, she criticizes her for giving Skip a bad treatment.

Slowly, the baby brings spirit to the lives of Lydia and Skip. Then one night, Skip's friends from the past break in, only to be caught by Skip, who has alarmed the police. Chris, among the two friends, feels betrayed by Skip and claims that Skip was in on the crime when the police arrive. Not only is Skip arrested, but the baby is taken in as well. In jail, he finds out that the baby's mother wants her child back, upsetting Skip for feeling that he is now her father. Jennifer, who now takes a liking in Skip, bails him out and decides to help him demand custody of Faith. Skip, however, fears that he will lose the battle, and decides to give up, both disappointing Jennifer and Lydia.

Throughout the film, in flashbacks, the viewer learns that Lydia (Janaya Stephens) made mistakes in the past as well as Skip. She was once a lustful young woman with many men in her lives, including the married father of one of her friends. She then married a family friend, Benny (Diego Klattenhoff) when she got into trouble, and gave birth to his daughter Meredith at age 19. Sometime later, Benny was killed in action, leaving Lydia heartbroken at home, while her brother Sunny (Marcus Hutchings) committed suicide after revealing to Lydia that he had lost his true love.

Back in the present, Lydia processes Skip's rejection and finds through a letter that Sunny was a closeted homosexual man in love with Benny. Skip hands over the baby to the true mother in the presence of Lydia, who in a speech announces that the young lady does not deserve to be her mother. The next morning, she dies in her chair while thinking about her past with Sunny and Benny. Skip inherits the garage including its contents, such as a Cadillac and boxes filled with $70,000.

== Cast ==
- Mary Tyler Moore as Lydia Blessing
- Liam Waite as Charles 'Skip' Cuddy
- China Chow as Jennifer Foster
- Kathleen Quinlan as Meredith Blessing
- Janaya Stephens as Young Lydia Blessing
- Ralph Waite as Sheriff
- Joris Jarsky as Chris
- Laura Regan as Shelley Dimmick
- Marcus Hutchings as Sunny
- Diego Klattenhoff as Benito
- Kendra Ridgley as Toddler Meredith

== Production ==
Actress Mary Tyler Moore read the script before casting took place and was immediately interested in the role. In an interview with CBS, Moore expressed her interest: "Without even thinking that I would be playing that. I mean, you know, for my age, mid-60s to..., 82 it is a stretch. But I thought I could handle it, especially after doing The Gin Game with Dick Van Dyke where I played a woman in her early 80s. I was just so challenged and fascinated by this script, which takes you through some emotional things and some funny things. But primarily it doesn't tie up every little frayed ending into a neat little bow and it leaves you gasping." The film was shot in Nova Scotia in the summer of 2003.
