= Dream Children =

1998 novel by A. N. Wilson

- First edition cover
- Author: A. N. Wilson
- Language: English
- Genre: Novel
- Publisher: W. W. Norton
- Publication date: August 1998
- Publication place: United Kingdom
- Media type: Hardback and paperback
- Pages: 218 pp (first edition, hardback)
- ISBN: 0-393-02740-6 (first edition, hardback)
- OCLC: 39050887
- Dewey Decimal: 823/.914 21
- LC Class: PR6073.I439 D7 1998

Dream Children is a 1998 novel by A. N. Wilson.

== Plot summary ==
Owing to his own early encounters, Oliver Gold, a distinguished philosopher, has decided he can only be happy with a child. Oliver, however, moves in with a widow in North London. He makes all the ladies around him fall in love with him, from the aging matriarch to a pair of lesbian lovers to a little girl named Bobs. Bobs is aged three when Oliver moves in and is aged ten by the end of the book.

== Publication ==
=== Development ===
Dream Children was published by W. W. Norton & Company on August 1, 1998.

== Reception ==
The book received positive reception upon release. Kirkus Reviews described the book as being timely and disturbing in equal measure. Publishers Weekly was mostly positive but argued that it lacked "the brilliant consistency of vision of Lolita."
