= The Mad Woman's 18 Years =

Taiwanese story, adapted into films

The Mad Woman's 18 Years (Chinese: 瘋女十八年; pinyin: Fēng nǚ shíbā nián) is a Taiwanese true story about a woman who was clinically insane. Her tragic fate—being sent to a Buddhist temple and eventually confined in a cage for eighteen years—has become a well-known Taiwanese folk tale. Set in a time before psychiatric hospitals, families often confined mentally ill members, only providing basic care. The story was adapted into several films and TV adaptations.

== Origin ==
The origins of the story trace back to Xigang Township of Tainan County (now Xigang Distrinct, Tainan City). A journalist from China Daily first reported on a married woman with the last name Huang who was said to have gone mad after her husband abandoned her, leading her to be confined and mistreated in a Buddhist temple.

In a 2011 interview with China Times, Huang's sister clarified that Huang was originally a child bride and married to a man who was nicknamed "Earthworm" (Chinese: 蚯蚓仔; pinyin: Qiūyǐn zǐ). After her husband took a concubine, Huang left to practice Taoism and showed no initial signs of mental illness. However, she later showed signs of mentally instability, exhibiting unprovoked laughter and aggressive tendencies.

Her father, who was the abbot of Xinhe Temple in Xigang District, placed her in the care of the temple. Huang grew aggressive, leading the temple to restrain her for the safety of the community. Initially, she was confined in a bamboo cage, which was eventually replaced by a brick house after public outcry. Though Xinhe Temple's actions were highly controversial, Huang's sister stated that her condition was dire and this was seen as the only option.

== Plot ==
During the Japanese occupation of Taiwan, an orphan (Hsiao Yen-Chiu) sold herself to cover her mother's burial costs, only to be sexually assaulted by her adoptive father. Later, she was sold into work as a hostess, where her mental condition worsened. Ultimately, she was confined in a wooden cage for 18 years and treated as if she were insane. After a newspaper reported her story, concerned members of society intervened and had her rescued, transferring her to a relief institution for treatment.

== Adaptations ==
Film

1957: In the original 1957 version, Hsiao Yen-Chiu plays the titular mad woman who marries a rich man and is driven to madness. It was originally shot in black-and-white. This film varies from other adaptations as it is in Taiwanese Hokkien, rather than Mandarin. The film was written and directed by Bai Ke, originally titled Eighteen Years of Hell on Earth (Chinese: 十八年人間地獄; pinyin: Shíbā nián rénjiān dìyù).

1979: The Mad Woman's 18 Years (Chinese: 瘋女十八年; pinyin: Fēng nǚ shíbā nián), directed by Xu Tiangrong, stars Ouyang Ling-long (Chinese: 歐陽玲瓏) as the titular woman. It was released on June 30. This film was produced by the same company of the original 1957 version.

1988: My Beloved/Mother Love Me Once Again (Chinese: 媽媽再愛我一次/世上只有妈妈好; pinyin: Māmā zài ài wǒ yīcì/shìshàng zhǐyǒu māmā hǎo; lit. 'Mom loves me again/Mom is the only one good in the world') stars Li Xiaofei (Chinese: 李小飛) as a young psychiatrist who meets his lost birth mother in the hospital. This film was produced in Taiwan and became popular in Mainland China.

TV

1988: The Mad Woman's 18 Years (Chinese: 瘋女十八年; pinyin: Fēng nǚ shíbā nián) was adapted to a 30-episode television series produced in Taiwan that aired on China Television from August 31 to October 4.

1995: The Incredible Wife (Chinese: 驚世媳婦; pinyin: Jīng shì xífù) is a 70-episode television series based on the folk story and produced in Taiwan that aired on China Television from May 30 to September 4, produced by Song Wenzhong. The production team created new content, expanding on the original story but also causing the plot to diverse significantly. The producer stated that the plot was freely adapted by screenwriters to avoid affecting the family of those involved.

2002: In 2002, the First Theater produced another adaptation, which aired on July 14.

2008: Yun Niang (Chinese: 芸娘; pinyin: Yún niáng) is a 32-episode television series produced in Mainland China in the style of Chiung Yao. An Yixuan plays a daughter whose mother, a poor woman, has been locked up as mad by her husband’s second wife. The daughter, unaware of her origins, marries the son adopted by the "mad" woman. The truth emerges, and the mother is recognized, but tragedy follows as the second wife descends into madness herself and is eventually locked up.

2014: The most recent adaptation, produced by Xihuo Taiwan, aired from March 17–21.

== See also ==
- I Never Promised You a Rose Garden, 1964 novel
