= Joanne Greenberg =

American author (born 1932)

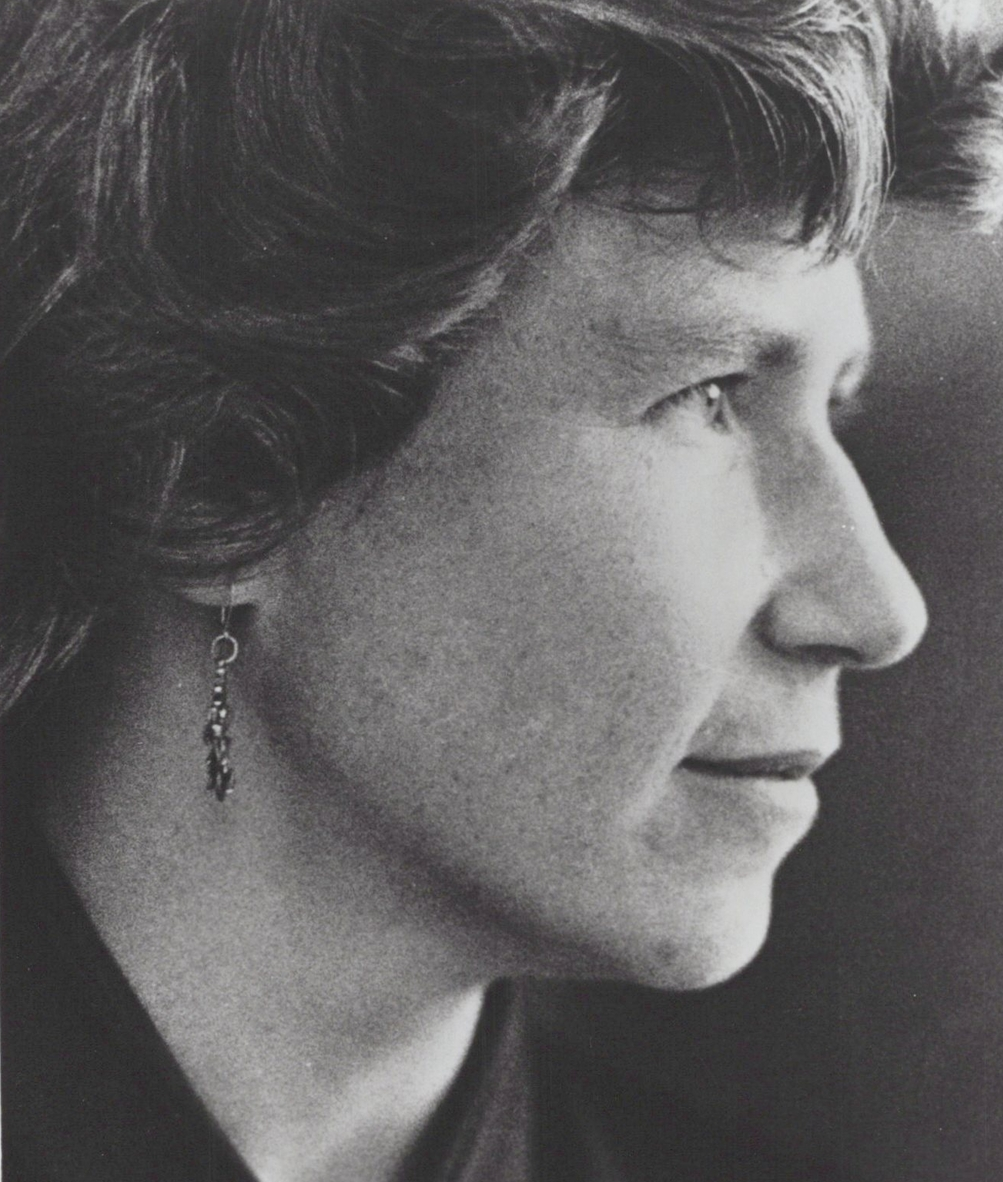
- Greenberg in 1972
- Born: September 24, 1932 (age 93); New York City, U.S.
- Occupations: Novelist, professor
- Writing career
- Pen name: Hannah Green
- Period: 1963-present
- Notable work: I Never Promised You a Rose Garden (1964)
- Notable awards: Harry and Ethel Daroff Memorial Fiction Award (1963); National Jewish Book Award (1963)
- Website: rosegardenwriter.com

Joanne Greenberg (born September 24, 1932, in Brooklyn, New York) is an American author who published some of her work under the pen name of Hannah Green. She was a professor of anthropology at the Colorado School of Mines and a volunteer Emergency Medical Technician.

Greenberg is best known for the semi-autobiographical bestselling novel I Never Promised You a Rose Garden (1964). It was adapted into a 1977 movie and a 2004 play of the same name.

She received the Harry and Ethel Daroff Memorial Fiction Award as well as the National Jewish Book Award for Fiction in 1963 for her debut novel The King's Persons (1963), about the massacre of the Jewish population of York at York Castle in 1190.

Greenberg appears in the Daniel Mackler documentary Take These Broken Wings (2004) about recovering from schizophrenia without the use of psychiatric medication.

Her book In This Sign (1970) was made into a Hallmark Hall of Fame television movie titled Love Is Never Silent, aired on NBC in December 1985.

== Bibliography ==
- The King's Persons (1963)
- I Never Promised You a Rose Garden (1964)
- The Monday Voices (1965)
- Summering: A Book of Short Stories (1966)
- In This Sign (1970)
- And Sarah Laughed (1972)
- Rites of Passage (short stories) (1972)
- Founder's Praise (1976)
- High Crimes and Misdemeanors (short stories) (1979)
- A Season of Delight (1981)
- The Far Side of Victory (1983)
- Simple Gifts (1986)
- Age of Consent (1987)
- Of Such Small Differences (1988)
- With The Snow Queen (short stories) (1991)
- No Reck'ning Made (1993)
- Where The Road Goes (1998)
- Appearances (2006)
- Miri, Who Charms (2009)
- All I've Done for You (2017)
- Jubilee Year (2020)
- On the Run (2023)
