= John McPherson (cinematographer) =

American filmmaker

- Born: John Alan McPherson; December 30, 1941; Los Angeles, California
- Died: December 21, 2007 (aged 65); Westlake Village, California
- Occupations: Cinematographer film director screenwriter
- Awards: Primetime Emmy Award for Outstanding Cinematography - Series

John Alan McPherson (December 30, 1941 - December 21, 2007) was an American cinematographer, film director, and screenwriter.

== Biography ==
Born in Los Angeles in 1941, McPherson grew up in Manhattan Beach, California, where he graduated from Mira Costa High School in 1959. In 1965, McPherson started working as a gaffer, before transitioning into television cinematography in 1977, starting with The Incredible Hulk.

McPherson joined the American Society of Cinematographers in 1980, and served as a member of the Directors Guild of America for 23 years, from 1984 until his death in 2007. McPherson attended American State University in the 1990s, where he majored in film: he earned a Bachelor's degree in cinema in 1996, and a Master's degree in film in 1998.

McPherson won both a Primetime Emmy Award and an Outstanding Achievement in Cinematography for a Series for "The Mission" on Amazing Stories.

== Death ==
McPherson died unexpectedly at his home in Westlake Village, California, on December 21, 2007. He was 65 years old.

== Filmography ==
As cinematographer

- The Incredible Hulk (1977) (TV movie)
- Kojak (1973-1978) (20 episodes)
- Bride of the Incredible Hulk (1980) (TV movie)
- The Incredible Hulk (1978-1982) (57 episodes)
- The Archer: Fugitive from the Empire (1981)
- Darkroom (1980-1981) (5 episodes)
- Senior Trip (1981) (TV movie)
- Eleanor, First Lady of the World (1982) (TV movie)
- Voyagers! (1982-1983) (1 episode)
- Voyager from the Unknown (1982)
- St. Elsewhere (1982-1988) (12 episodes)
- The Powers of Matthew Star (1982-1983) (1 episode)
- V (1983) (miniseries)
- Trauma Center (1983 series) (7 episodes)
- Legmen (1984 series) (1 episode)
- Hot Pursuit (1984 series) (7 episodes)
- A Reason to Live (1985) (TV Movie)
- Just One of the Guys (1985)
- Shadow Chasers (1985-1986) (1 episode)
- Acceptable Risks (1986) (TV movie)
- Amazing Stories (1986) (TV movie)
- Amazing Stories (1985-1987) (14 episodes)
- Jaws: The Revenge (1987)
- Batteries Not Included (1987)
- Short Circuit 2 (1988)
- Fletch Lives (1989)
- The Littlest Victims (1989) (TV Movie)
- Baywatch: Panic at Malibu Pier (1989) (TV movie)
- Hanna-Barbera's 50th: A Yabba Dabba Doo Celebration (1989)
- Alien Nation (1989-1990) (1 episode)
- Alien Nation (1989) (TV movie)
- Bingo (1991)

As director

- The Incredible Hulk (1977-1982) (7 episodes)
- Darkroom (1980-1981) (2 episodes)
- Swamp Thing (1990-1993) (7 episodes)
- Alien Nation (5 episodes)
- Strays (1991) (TV movie)
- Dirty Work (1992) (TV movie)
- Fade to Black (1993) (TV movie)
- The Untouchables (1993–1994) (8 episodes)
- Incident at Deception Ridge (1994) (TV Movie)
- The Watcher (1995 series) (1 episode)
- Simon & Simon: In Trouble Again (1995) (TV Movie)
- Extreme (1995 series) (1 episode)
- Strange Luck (1995-1996) (1 episode)
- JAG (1995-1996) (1 episode)
- Sliders (1995-2000) (1 episode, 1996)
- Babylon 5 (1993-1998) (1 episode, 1996)
- Nash Bridges (1996-2001) (1 episode, 1997)
- Beverly Hills, 90210 (1990-2000) (1 episode, 1998)
- Seven Days (1998-2001) (22 episodes)

As producer

- Dirty Work (1992) (TV movie)
- Fade to Black (1993) (TV movie)
- Seven Days (1998-2001) (42 episodes)
