= Hitler: A Short Biography =

- Author: A. N. Wilson
- Language: English
- Subject: Adolf Hitler
- Published: 2012
- Media type: Print
- Pages: 224
- LC Class: DD247.H5

Hitler: A Short Biography is a short biography of Adolf Hitler by A. N. Wilson, published by HarperCollins in 2012.

== Reception ==
The book was very unfavourably reviewed in the New Statesman by the historian Richard J. Evans, who criticised various perceived factual errors and called it "valueless" (the review was subsequently shortlisted for the Hatchet Job of the Year award). The review sparked a feud between the two men.
