= Blackout (1985 film) =

1985 film

- VHS released by Fox Hills Video
- Genre: Thriller
- Screenplay by: David Ambrose
- Story by: Richard Smith; Richard Parks; Les Alexander; David Ambrose
- Directed by: Douglas Hickox
- Starring: Keith Carradine; Richard Widmark; Kathleen Quinlan
- Composer: Laurence Rosenthal
- Country of origin: United States
- Original language: English

Production
- Executive producers: Roger Gimbel; Freyda Rothstein
- Producers: Richard Smith; Richard Parks; Les Alexander
- Cinematography: Tak Fujimoto
- Editor: Michael Brown
- Running time: 94 minutes
- Production companies: Lee Rock Industries Ltd. Peregrine Entertainment Ltd. Roger Gimbel Productions; Alexander Smith & Parks Inc. HBO Premiere Films

Original release
- Network: HBO
- Release: July 28, 1985

Blackout is a 1985 American made-for-television psychological thriller film directed by Douglas Hickox, and written by Richard Smith, Richard Parks, Les Alexander, and David Ambrose. It stars Keith Carradine, Richard Widmark and Kathleen Quinlan.

== Plot ==
In Ohio, Lucy Vincent and her three children are found brutally murdered following a birthday party. Her husband, Ed Vincent, is missing and is believed to be the killer. Veteran homicide detective Joe Steiner is assigned to the case, but with Vincent missing, the case goes cold. A few days later in California, two men are involved in a fiery wreck that kills one and leaves the other disfigured. It's discovered that one of them is Allen Devlin. Police at first aren't sure which of the two he is as the deceased's corpse was burned, neither had identification, and the survivor has amnesia. The other man is suspected to have been a hitchhiker. Based on witness accounts, they determine the survivor is Allen.

Over the next year, Allen receives multiple facial reconstructive surgeries and attempts to remember his past with the help of Chris Graham, a nurse who treated him. They fall in love. Six years later, the two are happily married with children. Allen is a successful realtor and Chris is a stay-at-home mother. Steiner, having been forced into early retirement, still pursues clues in the Vincent murders. His old colleague, Phil Murphy, informs him that their precinct has received a tip for the murders in the form of a newspaper article featuring the Devlins. The tipster suggests Allen bears a strong resemblance to Ed Vincent.

Steiner travels to California to investigate. He encounters Allen and confesses his suspicions that Allen may be Ed Vincent. Police Chief Michael Patterson, Chris's old lover, urges Steiner to drop the investigation. Steiner admits that he believes Allen sent the newspaper article and has a split personality. Vincent is part of his subconsciousness that wants to be caught out of fear of killing again.

Allen hires a private investigator, John Davey, to confirm Steiner's accusation. Davey tracks down Theo Grant, who lent the vehicle that Allen and the hitchhiker were using at the time of the crash. Allen asks if he bears a resemblance to Vincent but Grant refuses to talk without compensation. That night while Allen is at work, Chris receives a call from a man with a distorted voice calling her Lucy and accusing her of having an affair.

Later, a woman is attacked in a park by a man wearing a leather mask. Steiner deduces that this attack is related to similar ones that happened in Ohio that suddenly stopped when the Vincent murders occurred. He suspects that Vincent was responsible for these attacks that eventually culminated in him murdering his family after he discovered Lucy was having an affair. That night, Davey is found murdered, and Patterson, believing Steiner may be right, calls for a search of the Devlin home. Nothing is found. Not long after, another attack is reported and Chris receives another disturbing phone call. In a panic to get her children out of the house, she discovers a black leather mask. She confronts Allen who claims innocence but, under the advice of his lawyer, admits himself into a psychiatric hospital.

Steiner and Patterson discuss the case at the latter's home where Steiner discovers a mural of photographs of Chris. Patterson admits that he is still in love with her and was the one who sent the newspaper article but denies making the calls to Chris. Steiner assumes that the entire Devlin case was a sham, an attempt by Patterson to falsely accuse Allen of the Vincent murders to destroy his marriage so Patterson could pursue Chris. His theory is seemingly confirmed when a rapist wearing a leather mask is caught. He later visits Chris and Allen, telling them both to be wary of Patterson. Allen is released from the hospital and the case against him is dropped.

That night, Patterson confronts Chris and warns her about her husband and denies being responsible for the calls. While preparing a birthday party for their son, Chris is attacked by an assailant in a leather mask. She manages to temporarily subdue him and pulls the mask off, revealing him to be Allen, confirming that he really is Ed Vincent, and that the man killed in the wreck was the real Allen Devlin. She manages to hide in her vehicle when he wakes and finds Patterson's dead body inside. Steiner, meanwhile, hears a birthday announcement for the Devlin child on the radio and, on a hunch, makes his way to their home. He arrives just in time to shoot Allen before he kills Chris. Days later, Chris visits Steiner and thanks him for saving her and her children's lives.

== Cast ==
- Richard Widmark (VF : Marc Cassot) as Joe Steiner
- Keith Carradine as Allen Devlin
- Kathleen Quinlan as Chris Graham
- Michael Beck as Michael Patterson
- Dameon Clarke as Battered Child Mauro
- Martina Deignan as Pauline
- Kenneth Kimmins as Dr. Kay (credited as Ken Kimmins)
- Jason Michas as Mark
- Gabrielle Rose as Victim's Friend
- Jerry Wasserman as Motel Clerk
- Don Hood as Phil Murphy

== Reception ==
While John J. O'Connor of The New York Times opined that Blackout was "never entirely convincing" and not even remotely memorable, he still admitted that it did manage "to build up a steady stream of scary suspense" and attain "maximum mileage" out of its "top-flight cast." A score of 2/5 was awarded by Joanna Berry of the Radio Times, who wrote that the film was an "average thriller" with "no real surprises in store for the detective or for the audience." In a review written for Ozus' World Movie Reviews, Dennis Schwartz gave Blackout a grade of B+ and labelled it a "fun watch" in spite of its predictable and "murky" plot that culminated in a "bland" ending. Horror News's Todd Martin was also frustrated and disappointed by Blackout's "bland and vanilla" conclusion, expressing the view that it and the director's apparent aversion to taking risks turned what could have been "a brilliant film" into "an overall fumble."

== Real-life murder ==
Blackout gained notoriety following Ed Sherman's murder of his pregnant wife Ellen on August 3, 1985 in Connecticut due to its possibly being inspired by the film, which was submitted as evidence at Sherman's trial. Like a character in the film, Sherman killed his wife and used an air conditioner to try to slow decomposition of her remains in an attempt to establish an alibi. Sherman was sentenced to fifty years in prison in 1992, but died of a heart attack after serving almost four years. The case was featured in the Forensic Files episode "Dinner and a Movie."
