= Resolve =

Resolve may refer to:

== Music ==
- Resolve (band), a French metalcore band
- Resolve (Lagwagon album), 2005
- Resolve (Poppy Ackroyd album), 2018
- Resolve, an album by Last Tuesday, 2005
- "Resolve" (song), by the Foo Fighters, 2005

== Film and television ==
- The Resolve, a 1915 American silent short drama film
- "Resolve" (One Tree Hill), a 2007 TV episode
- "Resolve" (Tales of the Jedi), a 2022 TV episode
- "Resolve", a 2026 episode of the anime Mushoku Tensei

== Other uses ==
- Claris Resolve, a spreadsheet program
- DaVinci Resolve, video editing software
- DNS resolver, program responsible for initiating and sequencing a server address, in the Domain Name System
- Operation Resolve, an underwater search for the wreckage of South African Airways Flight 295
- Resolve, a British tugboat, formerly Empire Zona
- Resolve (poll), an Australian monthly political poll conducted monthly for The Sydney Morning Herald and The Age

== See also ==
- Resolved (disambiguation)
- Resolution (disambiguation)
