= She's in the Army Now =

1981 American made-for-television film

- Genre: Comedy
- Written by: Earl W. Wallace
- Directed by: Hy Averback
- Starring: Kathleen Quinlan; Jamie Lee Curtis; Melanie Griffith; Susan Blanchard; Julie Carmen; Janet MacLachlan
- Theme music composer: Artie Butler
- Country of origin: United States
- Original language: English

Production
- Producer: Harry R. Sherman
- Cinematography: William Jurgensen
- Editors: Diane Adler; George Rohrs
- Running time: 97 minutes
- Production company: ABC Circle Films

Original release
- Network: ABC
- Release: May 15, 1981

She's in the Army Now is a 1981 American made-for-television military comedy film starring Kathleen Quinlan, Jamie Lee Curtis, Melanie Griffith, Susan Blanchard and Julie Carmen, directed by Hy Averback. It premiered as the ABC Friday Night Movie on May 15, 1981.

The film was a pilot for a television series which never materialized and it also followed the success of Goldie Hawn's movie, Private Benjamin, which itself spawned a television series in the spring of 1981.

== Plot ==
Cass, Rita, Sylvie, Virginia, and Yvette, are five beautiful Women's Army Corps recruits attached to the United States Army's 3rd Platoon of Alpha Company at Fort Jackson. Although they are raw recruits, their drill sergeant, Sgt. Reed sees them as future soldiers. The proposal relates the women's efforts to train to become soldiers while also dealing with their personal problems. During and by the end of their basic training, they discover that a soldier's life is more than a uniform and that strength doesn't always depend on the size of their muscles.

== Cast ==
- Kathleen Quinlan as Pvt. Cass Donner
- Jamie Lee Curtis as Pvt. Rita Jennings
- Melanie Griffith as Pvt. Sylvie Knoll
- Susan Blanchard as Pvt. Virginia Marshall
- Julie Carmen as Pvt. Yvette Rios
- Janet MacLachlan as Sgt. Reed
- Dale Robinette as Sgt. Barnes
- Robert Pierce as Virgin Knoll
- Steven Bauer as Nick Donato (credited as Rocky Bauer)
