= Hsiao Yen-Chiu =

Taiwanese theater actor and film actor (born 1933)

- 小艷秋
- Born: Jian Xiu-Chou; 19 August 1933 (age 92); Taoyuan, Taiwan
- Other names: Hsiao Yan Hsiu, Xiao Yanqiu, Jian Xiuchou
- Education: Riyue Yuan Theater Troupe (Chinese: 日月園新劇團)
- Occupations: Theater actor; film actor
- Years active: c.1950–1959
- Notable work: The Mad Woman's 18 Years, 1957
- Spouse: Dr. Zhu Bao-Luo (Chinese: 朱保羅) (m. 1959)

Hsiao Yen-Chiu (Chinese: 小艷秋; born 19 August 1933) is a Taiwanese theater and film actress. Her career began when she was 17 with the Riyue Yuan Theatre Troupe, and she later moved into the film industry. Her first film, Lady Peach Blossom Crosses the River, was released in 1956. In 1957, she appeared in the Taiwanese film, The Mad Woman's 18 Years. She received the Silver Award in the Audience's Choice category for the Top Ten Film Stars.

Hsiao retired from acting in 1959 after marrying Dr. Zhu Bao-Lou.

== Early life ==
Hsiao Yen-Chiu was born 19 August 1933 in Taoyuan City, Taiwan. She was adopted as a newborn by the Jian family and given the name Jian Xiuchou.

At the age of 17, Hsiao joined the Riyue Yuan Theatre Troupe. She studied under director Cheng Cheng-Hsiung. She rose to prominence as a leading actress and was later promoted to principal performer of the troupe. Around this time, she adopted her stage name, Hsiao Yen-Chiu, given to her by an admirer, inspired by the Peking opera performer Cheng Yanqiu.

== Career ==
In 1956, director Guo Bailin cast Hsiao Yen-Chiu in Lady Peach Blossom Crosses the River, marking her transition from theatre to film.

Before relocating to Hong Kong, Hsiao Yen-Chiu was cast in Bai Ke's The Mad Woman's 18 Years, produced by Du Yun-Zhi. The film was based on a China Times report about a woman with a mental illness who had been confined in a temple for 18 years.

In 1957, Hsiao Yen-Chiu went to Hong Kong and signed a contract with Minsheng Film Company. She co-starred with actress Jiang Fan in Two Sisters in a Turbulent World and in director Chen Huanwen's Xue Mei Si Jun. Before Ling Bo became well-known, she played Hsiao Yen-Chiu's son in the latter film. Upon returning to Taiwan later that year, Hsiao Yen-Chiu starred in two Taiwanese films: Strange Story of Crematory, directed by Liang Zhefu, and Seaside Breeze, directed by Tian Chen.

== Awards ==
In 1957, Hsiao Yen-Chiu won the fan-voted "Top Ten Silver Star Award" at the inaugural Taiyu Pian Film Festival for her performance in The Mad Woman. The same year, she was voted the most popular actress in a Cinema Weekly readers' poll.

In 1958, she starred alongside Shih Chun in Alan, directed by Iwasawa Yotoku. She later made her Mandarin-language film debut in He Huan Shan Shan under director Pan Lei. Hsiao subsequently returned to Hong Kong to work with the Hong Kong Overseas Chinese Film Industry Company, where she appeared in three Amoy-dialect films: Love and Money, Love's Temptation, and The Love Between a Human and a Ghost.

Upon returning to Taiwan, she took on a leading role in the country's first martial arts film, Luo Xiao-Hu and Yu Jia-Long, directed by Liang Zhe-Fu.

== Personal life ==
Hsiao Yen-Chiu met her husband, Dr. Zhu Bao-Luo, while filming in Taichung in 1959. Following their marriage, she retired from acting. Her autobiography, Hsiao Yen-Chiu’s Memoirs: The Top Female Lead of Taiwanese Cinema, was published in 2021.

== Filmography ==
Year	Chinese title	English title	Notes	Ref.
1956	《桃花過渡》	Lady Peach Blossom Crosses the River		
1957	《瘋女十八年》	The Mad Woman's 18 Years		
1957	《亂世姐妹花》	Two Sisters in a Turbulent World		
1957	《雪梅思君》（also known as 《商輅斬文禧》)	Xue Mei Si Jun	Also known as Shang Lu Zhan Wenxi (no official English title)	
1957	《海邊風》	Seaside Breeze		
1957	《火葬場奇案》	Strange Story of Crematory		
1958	《阿蘭》	Alan		
1958	《愛情與金錢》	Love and Money		
1958	《愛的誘惑》	Love's Temptation		
1958	《明知失戀真艱苦》	Really Hard to Realize Being Jilted		
1958	《鬼戀》	The Love Between a Human and a Ghost		
1959	《合歡山上》	He Huan Shan Shan	Also known as Above Dgiyaq Bburaw	
1959	《羅小虎與玉嬌龍》	Luo Xiao-Hu and Yu Jia-Long		
1960	《秋怨》	Autumn Hate		
1960	《羅小虎與玉嬌龍（完結篇）》	Finale of Luo Xiao-Hu and Yu Jia-Long		
1960	《孤女報母仇》	The Orphan Girl Avenges Her Mother		

== Career honors ==
Year	Title	Awards	Ref.
1957	Mad Woman	"Audience Voted Top Ten Movie Stars Silver Star Award" at the first "Taiwanese Film and Film Festival" — but was unable to attend the award ceremony due to working on the Xiamen-language film "Xue Mei Si Jun" directed by Chen Huanwen in Hong Kong.	
1957	Mad Woman	Voted first place for the Ten Most Beloved Taiwanese Film Stars, Cinema Weekly.	
