= Code Red (American TV series) =

American action drama television series

- Genre: Drama; Action
- Created by: Laurence Heath
- Written by: Laurence Heath; Carole and Mike Raschella; Cliff Ruby; Elana Lesser
- Directed by: J. Lee Thompson; Fernando Lamas; Don Weis
- Starring: Lorne Greene; Andrew Stevens; Martina Deignan; Julie Adams; Sam J. Jones; Adam Rich
- Theme music composer: Morton Stevens
- Country of origin: United States
- Original language: English
- No. of seasons: 1
- No. of episodes: 19

Production
- Production locations: Los Angeles, California, U.S.
- Camera setup: Single-camera
- Running time: 90 minutes (pilot); 60 minutes (series)
- Production companies: Irwin Allen Productions; Columbia Pictures Television

Original release
- Release: November 1, 1981 – September 12, 1982

Code Red is an American action drama television series that ran on ABC from November 1, 1981, to September 12, 1982 and was produced by Irwin Allen. This was Allen's sixth and final television series, and his only series not produced for 20th Century Fox Television.

== Overview ==
The series stars Lorne Greene as Battalion Fire Chief Joe Rorchek and his family, some of whom, his elder sons Ted (Andrew Stevens) and Chris (Sam J. Jones), serve as firemen under his direct command as part of the Los Angeles Fire Department. In addition, Haley Green (Martina Deignan), the first female firefighter in the LAFD, is under Rorchek's command and serves with distinction both professionally and as a friend of the Rorcheks.

In addition, Joe Rorchek's preteen adopted son, Danny Blake (Adam Rich) serves as a member of the Firefighter Explorers organization, complete with his own uniform and turnout gear. Although still a child, Danny dreams of joining the family profession and enjoys privileged access to his family's professional activities. As a result, he has numerous adventures of his own armed with a cool head in the face of crisis and considerable fire safety and first aid skills for his age. Despite the danger, the male members of the Rorchek family have the full support of Ann Rorchek (Julie Adams), Joe's wife, who is proud of her family's calling.

In addition to family drama, the characters have numerous adventures with the various fires and other emergencies that happen in their operating area.

The series began with a television movie as Joe Rorchek as an arson investigator who is pursuing a dangerous arsonist who uses firebombs to start serious blazes that Rorchek's sons have to fight. Meanwhile, Green, recently assigned to the Rorcheks' unit, strives to prove herself to skeptical fire fighter Al Martelli (Jack Lindine). When the series was approved for production, Greene's character was reassigned to command the task force "Station 1" (in actuality, the real LAFD Station 49, which was used for establishing and exterior shots during the show's production), located on the city's waterfront as a more suitable premise for the series. The station is a large one, and houses Pumper 1, Truck 1, Wagon 1, and Battalion 6 for Chief Rorchek, as well as a helicopter piloted by Chris Rorchek and a fireboat moored at a dock built into the station.

Given that the series was scheduled for early Sunday evening for a family audience, many episodes end with a coda where a cast member addresses the audience about fire safety and first aid.

== Episodes ==
No.	Title	Directed by	Written by	Original release date
0	"Code Red"	J. Lee Thompson	Laurence Heath	September 20, 1981
1	"A Saved Life"	Georg Fenady	Lee Hunter, Carol Raschella & Michael Raschella (t), Lee Hunter (s)	November 1, 1981
2	"Death of a Fireman"	James Sheldon	Don Boyle	November 8, 1981
3	"Dark Fire"	Earl Bellamy	Jackson Gillis (t), Ray Brenner (s)	November 15, 1981
4	"The Little Girl Who Cried Fire"	Christian I. Nyby II	Ben Masselink	November 22, 1981
5	"The Land of Make Believe (All That Glitters)"	James Sheldon	George Geiger and Chris Bunch & Allan Cole	November 29, 1981
6	"Fireworks"	Phil Bondelli	Rick Edelstein (t), Carole Raschella (s/t), Mike Raschella (s/t)	December 6, 1981
7	"Framed by Fire"	Don Weis	Carole & Michael Raschella	December 13, 1981
8	"From One Little Spark"	Fernando Lamas	Rick Edelstein	January 3, 1982
9	"Wildfire"	James Sheldon	George Geiger (t), Jackson Gillis (s)	January 10, 1982
10	"My Life Is Yours"	Don Weis	Rick Edelstein	January 17, 1982
11	"Happy Birthday"	Phil Bondelli	George Geiger	January 31, 1982
12	"Revenge"	Ernest Pintoff	George Geiger (t), Rift Fournier (s)	February 7, 1982
13	"Burnout"	Phil Bondelli	B.W. Sandefur	February 14, 1982
14	"Trapped by Time"	Fernando Lamas	Donald R. Boyle	February 21, 1982
15	"Trial by Fire"	Phil Bondelli	Cliff Ruby, Elana Lesser	February 28, 1982
16	"Riddle in the Flames"	Ernest Pintoff	Donald R. Boyle	March 14, 1982
17	"No Escape"	Phil Bondelli	Cliff Ruby, Elana Lesser	March 21, 1982
18	"Fire Below"	Ernest Pintoff	Donald R. Boyle	July 11, 1982
