= Trapped (1989 film) =

1989 television film by Fred Walton

- VHS released by MCA/Universal Home Video
- Genre: Thriller
- Written by: Steve Feke; Fred Walton
- Directed by: Fred Walton
- Starring: Kathleen Quinlan; Bruce Abbott; Katy Boyer; Ben Loggins
- Music by: Stephen Cohn
- Country of origin: United States
- Original language: English

Production
- Executive producer: Jon Epstein
- Producers: Joseph Bellotti; Robert T. Skodis; Gary L. Messenger
- Production locations: Dallas; Renaissance Tower
- Cinematography: George Koblasa
- Editor: David Byron Lloyd
- Running time: 92 minutes
- Production companies: Cine Enterprises; MCA Television Entertainment

Original release
- Network: USA Network
- Release: June 14, 1989

Trapped is a 1989 American made-for-television thriller film written and directed by Fred Walton, and co-written by Steve Feke. It stars Kathleen Quinlan and Bruce Abbott in the main roles. Katy Boyer co-stars.

== Plot ==
After a montage of photographs reveal that a young boy has died from exposure to toxic waste spilled by a company called NTX, the child's father bids goodbye to his wife's corpse, and heads for the Kupper-Dietz Building, a luxurious tower containing offices and laboratories owned by NTX. As the working day concludes, businesswomen Mary Ann Marshall and Renni are the last two daytime employees to leave the skyscraper, but on their way out, they discover that all of the exits are sealed, and that all of the telephones are dead.

While searching for aid, the pair spot an intruder and rush to the security room which they find abandoned, with signs of a violent struggle evident. The two are then attacked by the dead boy's father; Renni is killed and Mary Ann escapes by falling into an elevator, which brings her up to one of the tower's unfinished condominiums. There she meets John Doe, a corporate spy who has been secretly living in the building in order to steal industrial secrets from NTX. While John goes to investigate Mary Ann's claims of there being a killer on the loose, Mary Ann, after another close encounter with the murderer, heads up to the penthouse apartment to seek aid from Harold Manley, the head of NTX. She finds Manley dead, with newspaper articles about NTX stabbed into his chest.

Mary Ann reunites with John, who had stumbled onto the bodies of a pair of murdered guards, and together they go looking for the building's remaining watchman. They find him just as he is fatally bludgeoned by the killer, who they narrowly evade. After John's arm is broken in the subsequent run-in with the maniac, he and Mary Ann separate with Mary Ann going into hiding in the parking garage. When the killer finds her, he and Mary Ann engage in a vehicular chase, during which the murderer's car begins leaking fuel. John, who had been drawn to the garage by the noise, sets the spilled gas on fire, blowing up the killer's car after he crashes it into Mary Ann's.

When the building comes out of automatic lockdown at 6:00am, John slips away. Mary Ann is treated by paramedics and questioned by the police. She returns home where she is greeted by John.

== Cast ==
- Kathleen Quinlan as Mary Ann Marshall
- Bruce Abbott as John Doe
- Katy Boyer as Renni
- Ben Loggins as Killer
- Tyrees Allen as Danny
- Miles Mutchler as Mr. Kappleman
- Wirt Cain as Harold Manley
- Bill Whitehead as Mr. Danuser

== Reception ==
Ray Loynd of the Los Angeles Times praised the film as "a tightly wrought thriller" while People's John Stark criticized it heavily, writing, "it has stilted dialogue, is badly acted and moves as quickly as a bloated buffalo. The title gives fair warning about what the movie is like to sit through." John Stanley, author of Creature Features: The Science Fiction, Fantasy, and Horror Movie Guide, similarly referred to Trapped as a "Clichéd TV-movie, lacking in originality."
