= Last Light (film) =

- Genre: Action; Drama; Thriller
- Written by: Robert Eisele
- Directed by: Kiefer Sutherland
- Starring: Forest Whitaker; Kiefer Sutherland; Amanda Plummer; Kathleen Quinlan; Lynne Moody; Clancy Brown
- Theme music composer: Jude Cole
- Country of origin: United States
- Original language: English

Production
- Executive producers: Robert Eisele; Charles Weinstock
- Producer: Mary McLaglen
- Production location: Soledad Prison
- Cinematography: Ric Waite
- Editor: Steven Weisberg
- Running time: 104 minutes
- Production company: Showtime Pictures

Original release
- Release: August 22, 1993

Last Light is a 1993 American drama film starring Forest Whitaker, Kiefer Sutherland and Clancy Brown. It was Sutherland's directorial debut.

== Plot ==
The film is about a prisoner awaiting execution. Denver Bayliss (Kiefer Sutherland) gains an unlikely friend and confidant in Fred Whitmore (Forest Whitaker), a former cop who is now a prison guard. Whitmore's life is a mess, as he shuts out his wife and cannot relate to his son. As Bayliss's execution draws nearer, Whitmore clashes more and more with Lt. McMannis (Clancy Brown), his supervisor, over Bayliss's treatment. Bayliss gives Whitmore a new understanding of life by helping him come to terms with a traumatic past, and Whitmore helps Bayliss to make his peace with himself and the world.

== Cast ==
- Forest Whitaker as Fred Whitmore
- Kiefer Sutherland as "Denver" Bayliss
- Clancy Brown as Lieutenant Lionel McMannis
- Lynne Moody as Hope Whitmore
- Amanda Plummer as Lillian Burke, Denver Bayliss's Sister
- Kathleen Quinlan as Kathy Rubicek
- Danny Trejo as 2nd Inmate
