= Tyrees Allen =

American actor

- Born: July 31, 1954 (age 72); Salina, Kansas, U.S.
- Education: Marymount College
- Occupation: Actor
- Years active: 1980–present

Tyrees Allen (born July 31, 1954) is an American actor on stage, television, and film.

== Early life ==
Allen was born in Salina, Kansas. In 1972, he graduated from Salina Central High School. He later attended Marymount College in Salina, where he graduated with a degree in Theater Arts.

== Career ==
Allen's fifty-five television credits include these: series regular roles on Women's Murder Club and Dark Blue; recurring and guest roles on The Practice, Alias, Cold Case, Without A Trace, Castle, Scandal, CSI:Miami, and Brothers & Sisters.

Allen appeared in New York in the 2000 Broadway production of Aida and the 2003 Broadway revival of William Shakespeare's Henry IV.

In May 2013, Allen played the role of "Troy Maxson" in the August Wilson play Fences at the African-American Repertory Theater in DeSoto, Texas.

In 2018, Allen starred in the SpeakEasy Stage Company's production of Between Riverside and Crazy as Walter "Pops" Washington, a role for which he won both the Elliot Norton Award for Outstanding Actor and IRNE Award for Best Actor. He returned to SpeakEasy the following season to play Robin in The Children.

== Filmography ==
=== Film ===
Year	Title	Role	Notes
1980	Up the Academy	Assistant Cook	
1984	Innocent Prey	Fletcher	
1985	The Dirt Bike Kid	Sergeant	Credited as Tyress Allen
1987	RoboCop	Starkweather	Credited as Tyress Allen
1989	Riverbend	Gus	
1996	Late Bloomers	Charlie Choate	
2010	The Perfect Host	Roman	
2012	Y/N: You Lie, You Die	Therapist	

=== Television ===
Year	Title	Role	Notes
1983–1984	Dallas		2 episodes; credited as Tyress Allen
1985	When Dreams Come True	Patrolman	TV movie
1987	Buck James		Episode: "Pilot"
1989	Trapped	Danny	TV movie; credited as Tyress Allen
1991	Without Warning: The James Brady Story	FBI Agent	TV movie
1992	Fugitive Among Us	Jenkins	TV movie
1992	Touch and Die	Taxi Driver	TV movie
1992	Dangerous Curves	Tim Miller	Episode: "Obsession"
1994–1996	Mad About You	Bobby / Party Guest	3 episodes
1995	Pig Sty	Real Cable Guy	Episode: "Iowa vs. New York"
1995	Full House	Doctor	Episode: "Michelle Rides Again: Part 2"
1995	New York Daze	Friend #1	Episode: "Too Something"
1995	Living Single	Mike	Episode: "The Handyman Can"
1995	Almost Perfect	Line Producer	Episode: "Your Place or Mine?"
1995	Murder, She Wrote	Sgt. Unger	Episode: "Deadly Bidding"
1996	Frequent Flyer	Stockbroker	TV movie
1996	Walker, Texas Ranger	Mark Preston	3 episodes
1997	The Steve Harvey Show	Sterling	Episode: "Guess Who's Not Coming to Dinner?"
1997	Chicago Hope	Security Officer	Episode: "Love on the Rocks"
1997	12 Angry Men	Guard	TV movie
1997	Sister, Sister	Todd	Episode: "The Best Policy"
1998	Soldier of Fortune, Inc.		Episode: "Déja Vu"
1998	The Rat Pack	George Jacobs	TV movie
1998	Legalese	Rod Brooks	TV movie
1998	Malcolm & Eddie	Rev. Hughes	Episode: "Menace II Theology"
1998–2003	The Practice	A.D.A Curtis Simmons / A.D.A. Mark Campbell	5 episodes
1999	7th Heaven	Dr. Warren	Episode: "All That Jazz"
1999	Kenan & Kel	Guthrie Plunkett	Episode: "The Limo"
2003	Law & Order	Deputy Stanley	Episode: "Sheltered"
2004	JAG	Investigation Committee Lead General	Episode: "Fighting Words"
2005	Boston Legal	A.A.G. Doug Beecham	Episode: "Let Sales Ring"
2005	Bones	Ted Eller	Episode: "Pilot"
2005	Grey's Anatomy	Dr. Saltzman	Episode: "Something to Talk About"
2005	Alias	Gordon Dean	6 episodes
2006	Without a Trace	Reverend Hovis	Episode: "Blood Out"
2006	CSI: Miami	Dr. Gary Halliwell	Episode: "Deviant"
2006	Close to Home	Patrick Liman	3 episodes
2006	NCIS	Deputy Director Dean Welsh	Episode: "Hiatus (Part #2)"
2006	Medium	Capt. Jackson	Episode: "Be Kind, Rewind"
2006	A House Divided	Edmunds	TV movie
2007	Day Break		Episode: "What If It's Him?"
2007–2008	Women's Murder Club	Warren Jacobi	13 episode
2008	Cold Case	Warren Wilson	Episode: "Street Money"
2009	Lie to Me	DNC Chairman Baldridge	Episode: "Pilot"
2009	Brothers & Sisters	Dr. John Massey	2 episodes
2009–2010	Dark Blue	Capt. Russell Maynard	7 episodes
2011	Criminal Minds: Suspect Behavior	Detective Dave Richardson	Episode: "Night Hawks"
2012	Castle	Harvey Milton	Episode: "Cloudy with a Chance of Murder"
2012	Scandal	Dr. Carroll	Episode: "Happy Birthday, Mr. President"
2013	Burn Notice	CIA Director	Episode: "Sea Change"
2014	Revolution	Grant Carson	Episode: "Exposition Boulevard"
