= Scandal (Wilson novel) =

1983 novel by A. N. Wilson

Scandal, or Priscilla's Kindness
- First edition (publ. Hamish Hamilton)
- Author: A. N. Wilson
- Language: English
- Publisher: Hamish Hamilton
- Publication date: 1983
- ISBN: 0-241-11101-3 (first edition, hardcover)
- Dewey Decimal: 823.914
- LC Class: PR6073.I439 S3

Scandal, or Priscilla's Kindness is a satirical novel by A. N. Wilson first published in 1983 about a British politician's rise and fall, the latter caused by a relationship with a prostitute. Although the title is the same and there are similarities in the subject-matter, Wilson's book is not the literary basis of the 1989 film Scandal (in fact, both are inspired by the real-life Profumo affair).

== Plot summary ==
Set in the early 1980s, Scandal is about Derek Blore, an MP who, as a public figure, pays lip service to traditional values such as marriage, family and religion while at the same time paying for kinky sex with a young prostitute who is too stupid to realize who he really is. A few years earlier that girl, Bernadette Woolley, left her home town of Bognor Regis after an argument with her mother, went to London, advertised her services in a sleazy shop in Notting Hill, and had her first sexual intercourse, at 17, with her first customer.

Now Bernadette has her own flat in Hackney where she can work undisturbed, and a pimp looking after her, Stan Costigano. Without Bernadette knowing let alone caring about it, her apartment has been equipped with video cameras and microphones which can be used to compromise, and eventually blackmail, her customers. Soon the people who pull the strings behind the scenes have Blore on tape—a long-term victim of his public school education, in shorts, on his knees, begging to be caned by his "teacher", Bernadette. As it happens—this is the time of the Cold War—Costigano's employers have a direct link to the Soviet embassy, where each of the politician's clandestine visits to Hackney is secretly registered. When he becomes a secretary of state in the new government Blore finally stops seeing Bernadette because it dawns upon him that now the risk of being found out is just too high.

However, Derek Blore's downfall does not come about through Soviet intervention or through a political opponent seeing him enter or leave Bernadette's flat. Rather, it is his beautiful and absolutely loyal yet promiscuous wife Priscilla whose indiscretion towards her current lover, a journalist called Henry Feathers, triggers the "Blore Affair". ("Priscilla did not sleep with every man in London. When Feathers seduced her, it was a whole eighteen months since she had been unfaithful to Derek.") One day, after their lovemaking, she casually tells the journalist about the morning when her husband's "whore" came to see him at home. Reckoning that the story will be a scoop, Feathers composes a series of articles which finally appear in mid-summer, while the Blores are on a family holiday in France.

Denying all allegations, Derek Blore is intent on sitting out his ordeal ("I've been in politics now for twenty-five years. And I hope I'm going to be in politics for a further twenty-five years.") and also announces that he is of course planning to sue Feathers and his newspaper. However, the prime minister is informed of the true state of affairs, knows that Blore is lying, and has him arrested while he is taking part in a rural pageant in his capacity as a church warden.

== Quote ==
- On marriage:

Marriage was for the common-sensical, it was for those who took short views, or no views at all; it was for those for whom life was largely a matter of meals and clothes, orgasm and real estate. For anyone who nurtured Emotion as the centre of existence, and who felt the permanent pull of an unseen, spiritual or cerebral world, the quotidian triviality of married intimacy was bound to be intolerable. So, in practice, it invariably was. Not only were the married lives of most poets and musicians intolerable. So too were the lives of religious mystics if they made the mistake of getting married. As often as not, this category of person sensibly opted for a celibate existence. (Chapter Five)

== Adaptation ==
It was adapted for BBC tv in 1989, with the title Blore, MP, as part of the Screen One strand.

== See also ==
- A list of British political scandals, in particular the Profumo affair of 1963
- Blore MP at IMDb - the 1989 BBC One adaptation.
