= Depositional resolution =

In geology, the depositional resolution is the age span of objects that are contained within a stratum. In most cases the objects of interest are grains or fossils.

== Limit cases ==
One limiting case with an extremely low depositional resolution is a reworked fossil in a younger bed. Here the stratigraphic resolution is approximately the time span between the deposition of the bed and the first deposition of the reworked fossil.

The counterpart would be an environment that is rapidly covered in sediment, which kills and preserves all life present. Even in such cases there will still be some death assemblage around that has been generated beforehand. This puts a limit on the depositional resolution.

== Depositional resolution and stratigraphic resolution ==
Depositional resolution and stratigraphic resolution are different concepts. This is because stratigraphic resolution is based on the relation between different strata, whereas depositional resolution is a property within one stratum. Stratigraphic resolution can be higher than depositional resolution and vice versa. But since both are to some extent affected by the same controlling factors they can correlate.

== Literature ==
- Scarponi, Daniele (2012). "Sequence stratigraphy and the resolution of the fossil record". Geology. 41 (2). The Paleontological Society: 239–242. doi:10.1130/g33849.1.
- Kowalewsky, Michal; Bambach, Richard K. (2003). Harries, Peter J. (ed.). High-resolution approaches in stratigraphic paleontology. Springer Science & Business Media. pp. 1–48.
