= Stray (novel) =

1987 novel by A. N. Wilson

- First edition cover
- Author: A. N. Wilson
- Language: English
- Genre: Novel
- Publisher: Walker Books
- Publication date: 30 April 1987
- Publication place: United Kingdom
- Media type: Print (Hardback & Paperback)
- Pages: 176 pp (paperback edition)
- ISBN: 0-7445-0801-0 (paperback edition)
- OCLC: 17265064
- Dewey Decimal: 823/.914 Fic 20
- LC Class: PR6073.I439 S77 1987
- Preceded by: Tabitha

Stray is a novel by A. N. Wilson. It is a precursor to his picture book The Tabitha Stories, as it follows the life of Tabitha's father. The book was published in Great Britain in 1987 by Walker Books and was re-published in the United States by Orchard Books in 1989. Stray is dedicated to "A.L.R," who "reserved [his] kindest comments for a cat."

== Plot summary ==
A cat named "Pufftail" (he says that he truly has no name) tells his life story to his daughter Tabitha and his grandson. He tells of his life on the streets, in a pet shop, at a convent, with a kind grandmother, and with the cruel "June and Jim," among others and says that he has three tragic parts in his life.

In chronological order, the most important events of Pufftail's life are:

1. Being born
2. Separated from his mum with his brother
3. Being taken to a pet shop
4. Being taken in by Grandma Harris, until she dies
5. Being taken in by June and Jim Harbottle
6. The death of his brother
7. Being taken in by a convent of nuns
8. Joining the gang called "The Commune"
9. Being used to test a shampoo
10. Meeting his "wife"
11. The birth of his children
12. The death of his "wife"
13. Meeting his daughter, Tabitha
14. The birth of his grandchildren
