= I Never Promised You a Rose Garden (film) =

1977 film by Anthony Page

- Theatrical release poster
- Directed by: Anthony Page
- Screenplay by: Gavin Lambert; Lewis John Carlino
- Based on: I Never Promised You a Rose Garden by Joanne Greenberg
- Produced by: Edgar J. Scherick; Terence F. Deane
- Starring: Bibi Andersson; Kathleen Quinlan; Sylvia Sidney; Martine Bartlett; Lorraine Gary; Signe Hasso; Susan Tyrrell; Diane Varsi
- Cinematography: Bruce Logan
- Edited by: Garth Craven
- Music by: Paul Chihara
- Production companies: Palomar Pictures; Fadsin Cinema Associates
- Distributed by: New World Pictures
- Release date: July 14, 1977
- Running time: 96 minutes
- Country: United States
- Language: English
- Budget: $3 million
- Box office: $3.2 million

I Never Promised You a Rose Garden is a 1977 American drama film directed by Anthony Page from a screenplay by Gavin Lambert and Lewis John Carlino, based on the 1964 novel by Joanne Greenberg. The film stars Bibi Andersson, Kathleen Quinlan, Sylvia Sidney, Martine Bartlett, Lorraine Gary, Signe Hasso, Susan Tyrrell, and Diane Varsi. It follows a mentally ill teen who struggles between fantasy and reality, escaping to her own imaginary world.

The film premiered in New York City on July 14, 1977, and it was released in Los Angeles on August 18, 1977. It received mixed reviews from critics, and was nominated for Best Writing, Screenplay Based on Material from Another Medium at the 50th Academy Awards. It was also nominated for Best Motion Picture – Drama and Best Actress in a Motion Picture – Drama for Quinlan at the 35th Golden Globe Awards.

== Plot ==
Deborah is, at the age of 16, a borderline schizophrenic who spends most of her waking hours in a bizarre fantasy realm. After a suicide attempt, she lands in a mental institution, where the hostile environment threatens to destabilize her condition even further. It is only through the focused attention of the sympathetic Dr. Fried that Deborah is gradually able to distinguish between dreams and reality again.

== Cast ==
- Kathleen Quinlan as Deborah Blake
- Bibi Andersson as Dr. Fried
- Ben Piazza as Jay Blake
- Lorraine Gary as Esther Blake
- Martine Bartlett as Secret Wife
- Margo Ann Berdeshevsky as Drawing Patient
- Darlene Craviotto as Carla
- Reni Santoni as Hobbs
- Susan Tyrrell as Lee
- Signe Hasso as Helene
- Diane Varsi as Sylvia
- Norman Alden as McPherson
- Sylvia Sidney as Miss Coral
- Dennis Quaid as Shark, Baseball Pitcher
- Clint Howard as Baseball Catcher
- Karin de la Penha as Nurse
- Robert Viharo as Anterrabae
- Jeff Conaway as Lactamaeon
- Carol Worthington as patient with cerebral palsy ("spastic patient")
- Barbara Steele (uncredited) in fantasy sequence

== Production ==
A screen adaptation of the book had been in development off and on since 1967, with Natalie Wood, Liza Minnelli, and Mia Farrow all set to star at various times. Lewis John Carlino wrote a script for Columbia. Mary Rydell and Jan Kadar were attached as directors.

Eventually Edgar Scherit and Dan Blatt acquired the rights to the novel and Carlino's script from Columbia for $250,000.

In the wake of the success of One Flew Over the Cuckoo's Nest (1975), Roger Corman was able to get funding for a movie version of I Never Promised You a Rose Garden. He announced the movie would be made for $3 million directed by Peter Medak starring Charlotte Rampling. In October 1976 it was announced Corman wanted the lead roles to be played by Jodie Foster, David Bowie and Katharine Hepburn.

The movie was eventually directed by Anthony Page. He said Page convinced Corman the script needed a complete rewrite so Gavin Lambert was hired. Lambert later wrote "For the usual complex financial reasons, the start of shooting...couldn't be delayed, and I had only three weeks to work out a new approach to the material with Anthony, then write the screenplay." Lambert would work on the script twenty pages at a time, discuss these with Page in the evenings while he was preparing for the film at night. According to Lambert, "Principally on account of Anthony, whose work in TV had accustomed him to an atmosphere of crisis, the pressures were creatively stimulating."

Eventually Bibi Andersson played Dr. Fried, while Kathleen Quinlan played Deborah. Quinlan auditioned twice for the film but refused a third audition saying she had done as well as she could; Quinlan was cast anyway.

All references to Judaism were removed, including the storyline of the vicious cruelty Deborah suffered from anti-Semitic peers, so that her childhood bout with urethral cancer becomes the sole reason for Deborah's "retreat from reality". In an interview, Greenberg stated that the references to Judaism were removed because the producers were "terrified." The author added that the characterizations of mental illness in the film "stank on ice."

Deborah's name is changed from Blau (which means "blue" in German, and parallels the author's pseudonym "Green") to Blake. Another major theme of the book, Deborah's artistic talent which flourished in spite of her illness, was reduced to a scene in which she scribbles childishly on a drawing pad. The Kingdom Of Yr is portrayed on-screen, as are some of its gods, but never seen in its original ethereal beauty, only the wasteland that it became much later.

The background music for the Yr sequences is a recording of a Balinese Kecak, the ceremonial chant of the sacred monkeys from the Ramayana.

In a 2006 interview, Greenberg recalled that she was not consulted on any aspect of the film, and she was contacted only by Bibi Andersson. She recalled Andersson telling her that the producers had said Greenberg could not be consulted as she was "hopelessly insane".

The studio is listed as "Imorh" Productions, imorh (variously meaning "sleep", "death" or "insanity") being an Yri word from the novel.

The film was one of the most expensive ever made from New World Pictures.

In 1979, Corman said I Never Promised You a Rose Garden, Cries and Whispers, and Big Bad Mama "were probably the three most significant films we’ve been involved in [for New World], because each put us into a different area."

Joe Dante said "they just didn’t have enough money to do the movie properly. It’s a movie all about a fantasy world that they just couldn’t afford to create.” Corman's biographer wrote Corman "surely made some money" from I Never Promised You a Rose Garden, but it "lacked the staying power that denotes a classic, and a discouraged Corman returned to doing what he did best."

== Release ==
=== Box office ===
According to Lambert, "as well as making a small profit, the film had a critical success unusual for such a modest work, and was one of the first "alternative" off-Hollywood productions with no money to spare or flaunt, and human beings instead of special effects."

== Reception ==
On the review aggregator website Rotten Tomatoes, 40% of 5 critics' reviews are positive, with an average rating of 6.8/10. Filmink wrote in 2024 that "The film got nice reviews, did alright at the box office and lead actor Kathleen Quinlan went on to have a healthy career… but I think down deep, Corman was hoping for Oscars, cash and/or for Quinlan to become a star."

=== Critical response ===
Roger Ebert gave the film three stars out of four and wrote, "This is difficult material to bring to life, but a young actress named Kathleen Quinlan does it with heart and sensitivity. There were opportunities here for climbing the walls and chewing the scenery, I suppose, but her performance always finds the correct and convincing human note. And it's the skill with which Miss Quinlan (and Bibi Andersson) follow that thread of characterization that makes the movie work. Otherwise, those desert fantasies and all those feathers and fur might have been fatally distracting."

Vincent Canby of The New York Times stated "How Deborah, with the help of one remarkable doctor, is eventually able to recognize her own pain and thus come to some kind of terms with her demons is the moving substance of this film that leaves one almost as exhausted as the heroine." He also praised Kathleen Quinlan for "a remarkably fine, contained performance as Deborah. There are no mannerisms, no tricks, only a sense of panic barely contained, of intelligence and feeling struggling to break free."

Gene Siskel of the Chicago Tribune gave the film two-and-a-half stars out of four and wrote that Kathleen Quinlan was "smashing" in her first major role, but the plot "spends a lot of time—too much time—telling us about the troubled world of mental hospitals," and the fantasy sequences "run on too long and look phony."

Variety wrotein a negative review: "Good intentions resolve into high-minded tedium and pic's sensationalistic aspects come off as confusing or repulsive, sometimes both." Charles Champlin of the Los Angeles Times called it "a thrilling account of the struggle to save an attractive young girl from her self-destructive delusions," with Quinlan giving "a spectacular performance."

Gary Arnold of The Washington Post wrote "Unfortunately, the movie places a premium on shock effects and mawkish reassurances at the price of the authenticity and hard-earned inspirational resolution that distinguished the novel ... When the movie Deborah recovers, it seems an inexplicable and even ludicrous miracle, a happy ending for slipshod filmmakers."

Geoff Brown of The Monthly Film Bulletin called it "simplistic and sentimental...It is largely left to the cast, particularly the excellent Kathleen Quinlan, to invest the proceedings with any emotional truth."

=== Accolades ===
Year	Award	Category	Recipient(s)	Result
1978	35th Golden Globe Awards	Best Motion Picture – Drama	I Never Promised You a Rose Garden	Nominated
1978	35th Golden Globe Awards	Best Actress in a Motion Picture – Drama	Kathleen Quinlan	Nominated
1978	50th Academy Awards	Best Writing, Screenplay Based on Material from Another Medium	Gavin Lambert; Lewis John Carlino	Nominated
1978	30th Writers Guild of America Awards	Best Drama Adapted from Another Medium	Gavin Lambert; Lewis John Carlino	Nominated

== Notes ==
- Lambert, Gavin (2000). Mainly about Lindsay Anderson.
