= Strays (1991 film) =

- VHS cover variant
- Genre: Horror
- Written by: Shaun Cassidy
- Directed by: John McPherson
- Starring: Kathleen Quinlan; Timothy Busfield; Claudia Christian
- Music by: Michel Colombier
- Country of origin: United States
- Original language: English

Production
- Producer: Niki Marvin
- Cinematography: Jacques Haitkin
- Editor: Karen Stern
- Running time: 83 minutes
- Production companies: Niki Marvin Productions; MCA Television Entertainment

Original release
- Network: USA Network
- Release: December 18, 1991

Strays is a 1991 American horror television film directed by John McPherson, written by Shaun Cassidy, and starring Kathleen Quinlan and Timothy Busfield. It aired on the USA Network on December 18, 1991.

== Premise ==
Paul Jarrett is a lawyer from Chicago who moves into an isolated house with his wife Lindsey and his family. They soon find themselves being terrorized by a horde of stray cats.

== Cast ==
- Timothy Busfield as Paul Jarrett
- Kathleen Quinlan as Lindsey Jarrett
- Claudia Christian as Claire Lederer
- William Boyett as Dr. Lyle Sokol
- Heather and Jessica Lilly as Tessa Jarrett

== Release ==
Strays premiered on the USA Network on December 18, 1991.

=== Home media ===
MCA Universal Home Entertainment released Strays on VHS in 1992. Scream Factory released the film on Blu-ray on July 16, 2019.

== Reception ==
Kay Gardella of the New York Daily News praised the film as Hitchcockian, "a scary, nerve-tingling drama that keeps you jumping, but not from joy."

== See also ==
- List of natural horror films
