= Resolution (Wilson novel) =

2016 historical novel

- Title page of the hardback edition
- Author: A. N. Wilson
- Audio read by: Joe Jameson
- Language: English
- Genre: historical fiction
- Set in: 18th century
- Publisher: Atlantic Books
- Publication date: 1 September 2016
- Publication place: United Kingdom
- Pages: 278
- ISBN: 9781782398288
- OCLC: 970819076

Resolution is a 2016 historical novel by English writer A. N. Wilson. It is a fictionalised account of the life of the 18th century German naturalist, writer and revolutionary George Forster. Main aspects of Forster's life covered by the novel include his participation in the second voyage of James Cook, his marriage to Therese Heyne and his experiences in the French Revolution as a protagonist of the Republic of Mainz. The book is based on historical sources including the journals of Cook and of Forster's father Reinhold as well as Forster's works, but includes also some invented figures and deliberately deviates from some historical facts.

The book has been praised for its atmosphere, its imagination and its depictions of the Forster marriage, but also criticised for not adding much of value to the source material. The author justified turning Forster into a fictional character by stating that Forster himself had turned his life into fiction.

== Background ==
George Forster (27 November 1754–10 January 1794) was a German naturalist, writer and revolutionary. At the age of 17, he accompanied his father Reinhold on the 1772–1775 second voyage of James Cook. George was the assistant to his father, who served as the naturalist for the voyage. After their return to England, his father was forbidden from writing an account of the journey, and George wrote A Voyage Round the World instead, which was published in 1777. Forster became a professor at Collegium Carolinum in Kassel in 1778. In 1785, he married Therese Heyne, daughter of the University of Göttingen professor Christian Gottlob Heyne and moved with her to Vilnius. They had a difficult marriage, and a few years after their move to Mainz in 1788, Therese started an affair with Ludwig Ferdinand Huber. Forster became entangled in the French Revolution and was a leading spokesperson for the Republic of Mainz. In March 1793, Forster and Adam Lux were sent as delegates to Paris, where Lux was executed in November. After seeing Therese, Huber and his children in Travers, Switzerland, for a final time in late 1793, Forster died in Paris on 10 January 1794.

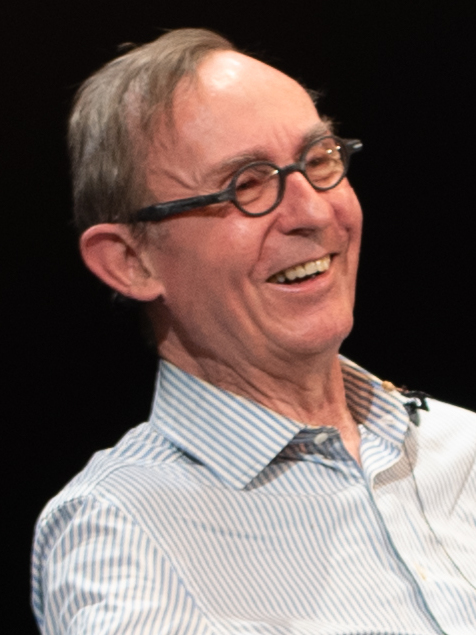
A. N. Wilson in 2023

A. N. Wilson (born 27 October 1950) is an English journalist, essayist and author. He has written more than twenty novels as well as several biographies. To explain why he wrote a fictionalised account of George Forster's life instead of a biography, Wilson stated in a Spectator column that Forster himself had turned his life into fiction, and "inhabit[ed] a borderline between fact and fiction."

== Content ==
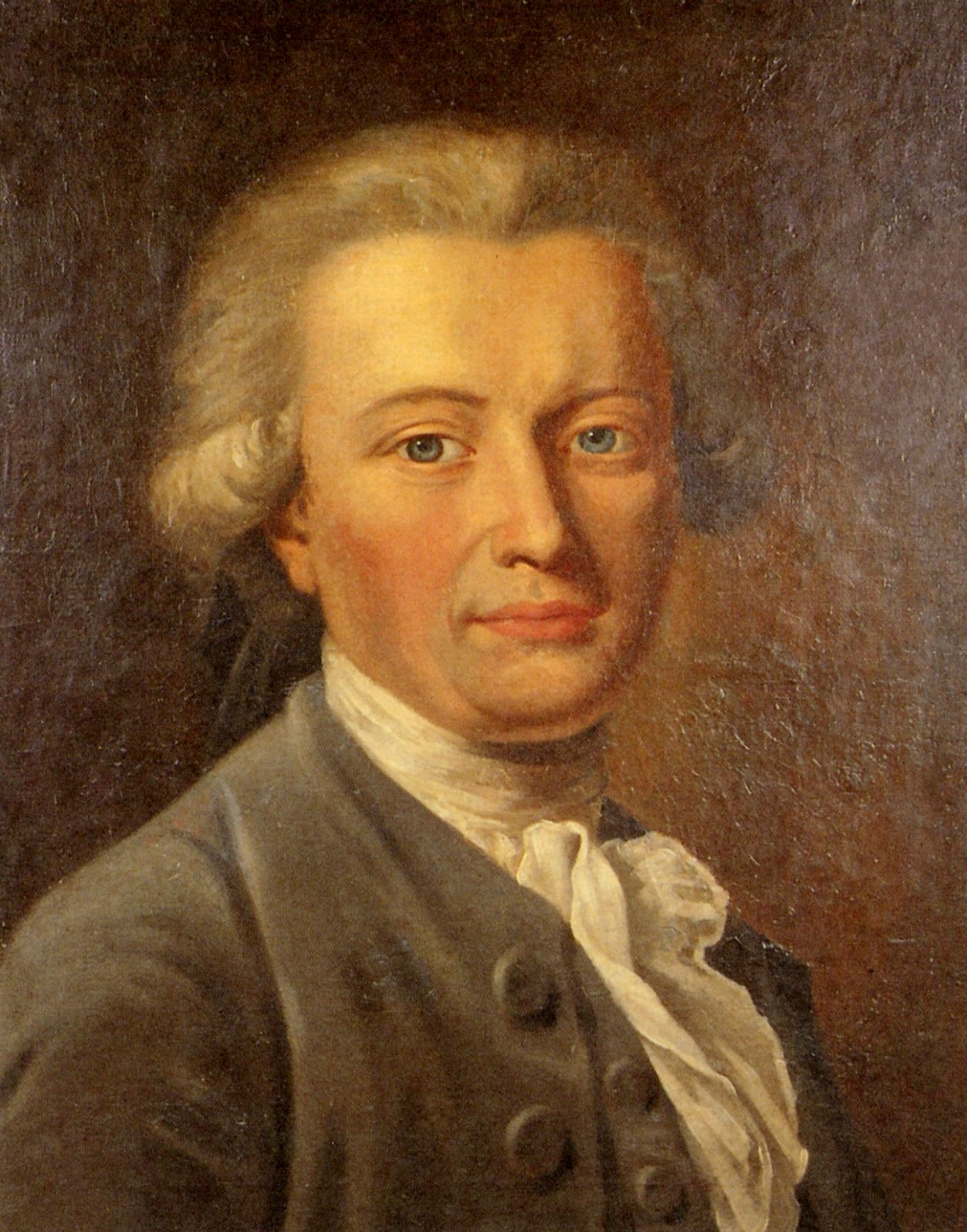
George Forster at age 26, by J. H. W. Tischbein, 1781

The novel interleaves the second voyage of James Cook with the rest of George Forster's life. The first scene is set in 1772 on board of HMS Resolution on the way to Cape Town. It contains a review of George Forster's early life, accompanying his father to Russia and then to England, and the preparations for Cook's journey including the withdrawal of Joseph Banks that allowed them to participate in his stead. It also introduces the character of Nally, a sailor who is hired as servant by the Forsters and who has a crush on George. The next scene, set in 1784, shows the beginning of George's difficult marriage to Therese Heyne with flashbacks to her early life. After a description of the events of Cook's journey towards the Antarctic in 1772/73, the book goes through Forster's life from 1785 to 1788: life in Vilnius with his wife and daughter Rose, the hope to go on the Mulovsky expedition, and after its cancellation the offer to become university librarian in Mainz. The following description of Cook's journey in 1773 includes stays in New Zealand, where the sailors have sexual relations with Maori women while George masturbates, and Tahiti, where he has a short sexual encounter with a local girl. In 1789 in Mainz, George meets Wilhelm and Alexander von Humboldt and journeys down the Rhine with the latter in 1790. They travel to England, where they visit James Cook's widow Elizabeth Batts Cook. On his return to Mainz, Therese is pregnant with Huber's child.

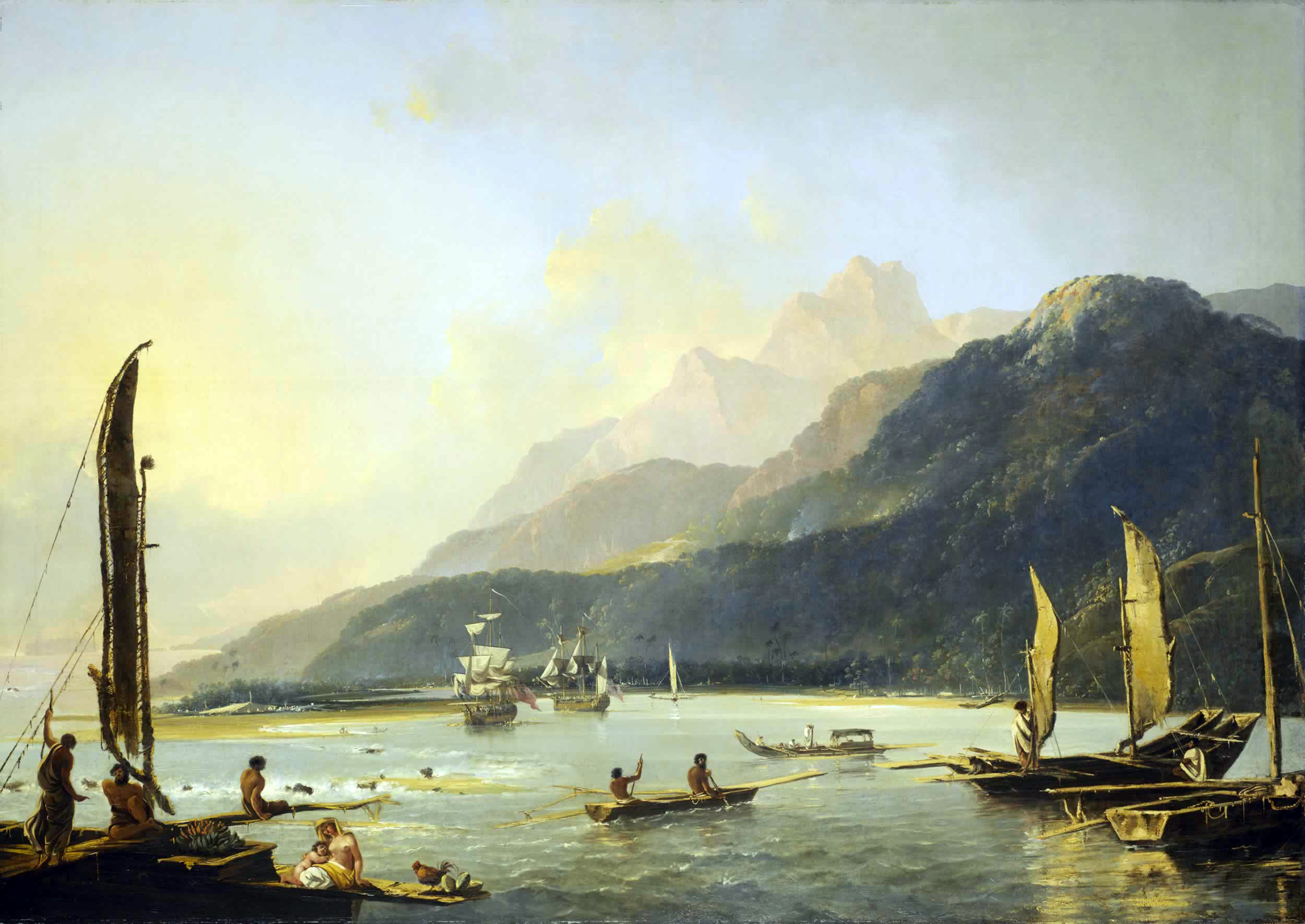
Resolution and Adventure in Matavai Bay by William Hodges

After a short scene in 1773 in which Cook talks to Reinhold Forster and hints at Nally's homosexuality, the book returns to 1791 Mainz, where another of Therese's children with Huber is born, but both children die early. Goethe visits Mainz, and the relationship between the Forsters deteriorates further. The French revolutionary army occupies Mainz, Therese and Huber leave the city, and Therese's childhood friend Caroline Böhmer starts an affair with Forster. In 1774, a scene on board Resolution is described where Reinhold Forster has his Tahitian dog (who George likes to play with) slaughtered to provide fresh meat for Captain Cook, which helps him overcome an illness. In 1793, Forster has become a supporter of the revolution but spends his days in bed with Caroline and telling her stories about his earlier life, including Nally's suicide after their return to England. He leaves for Paris. Back in 1774, Cook discovers South Georgia and the South Sandwich Islands and then returns to Cape Town. In Paris in 1793, Forster meets Jean-Paul Marat and Mary Wollstonecraft and writes to Therese and Huber to ask them to join him. After another scene on board Resolution in 1775 highlighting Reinhold Forster's difficult character, the final chapter starts with George on a secret mission for Maximilien Robespierre. He meets an Englishman, Major Manson, who recognises him and offers him safe passage to England. On a final meeting in Switzerland with Therese, Huber, and his children, he suggests going to London together. Returning to Paris, he catches pneumonia and dies in January 1794. In a final scene in 1775, Cook and the Forsters return to London.

In an afterword, Wilson mentions the sources of the book, which include Johann Reinhold Forster's Resolution journal, a four-volume edition of Forster's works and John Beaglehole's edition of James Cook's journals. He also explains some of his additions and changes: a sailor on Resolution, Nally, and the Englishman Major Manson that Forster meets while in French service have been made up, the execution of Adam Lux moved to a date more fitting for the narrative, and Forster's affair with Caroline Böhmer that occurs in the novel is not an established part of Forster scholarship.

== Publication and reception ==
The book was published in hardback on 1 September 2016 and in paperback on 1 June 2017 by Atlantic Books. An audiobook version, read by Joe Jameson, was published by Bolinda Audio in 2016. The book received mixed reviews. Writing for the Sydney Morning Herald, Ross Southernwood called the book a "historical novel of high interest and importance". The Guardian review by Alfred Hickling stated the book was "as much a factual account of Forster’s life as a piece of historical fiction", and found that Forster's extraordinary life was made credible by Wilson. Will Ennett wrote in the Press and Journal that Wilson's description of Forster as a "perennial wanderer" carried the readers along. In the London Times, James Marriott praised Wilson's ability to convey the intellectual atmosphere of the 18th century and the description of the married life of George and Therese, but criticised the pacing. Writing for Cook's Log, the journal of the Captain Cook Society, Graeme Lay found "much to admire" in the book and its moving depiction of Forster and his era, but criticised factual inaccuracies in the description of Cook's voyages. In a review for the Observer, Anthony Cummins criticised Wilson's focus on sex. He found that Wilson had not added much of value to his sources, and concluded that Resolution "would probably have been better off as straight history". Danielle Clode welcomed the book in her review for the Weekend Australian, as there are not many Forster biographies. She described the book, in which Forster appears less sophisticated than one would expect from his writings, as "vividly imaginative".
