= Thomas Stray =

Norwegian businessperson

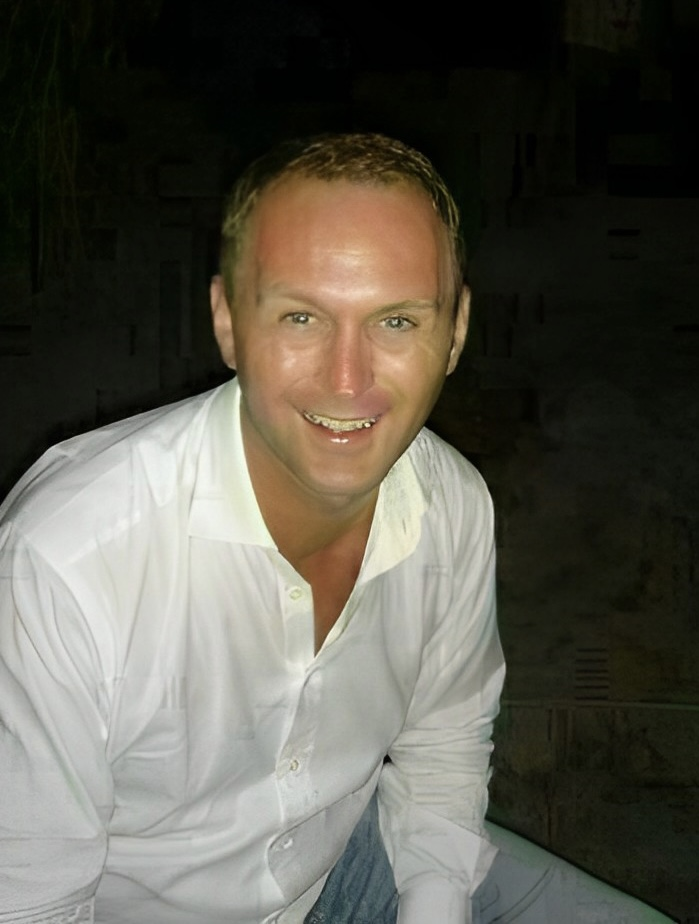
- Born: 1970 (age 55–56); Norway
- Occupation: Businessman
- Known for: Endemaj Funds

Thomas Stray (formerly Thomas Øye) (born 1970) is a Norwegian businessman.

== Career ==
Stray started out as an encyclopedia salesman. Stray started his financial career as a Key Account Manager, where he served for four years at Coca-Cola Norway beginning from 1992. Later, he became a broker in the brokerage firm Norse Securities. There, for a period he was the stockbroker who generated the most commission.

In 2001, Stray relocated permanently to Dubai, United Arab Emirates. In 2020, Stray founded Endemaj Funds in Dubai, which is a financial company that specializes in investment management. The company is currently headquartered in Dubai. In Dubai, Stray also founded the companies Private Driver and INVITE Dubai.
