= I Never Promised You a Rose Garden (play) =

I Never Promised You a Rose Garden is a 2004 play based on Joanne Greenberg's 1964 novel of the same name.

The play was written by Colorado playwright Walter L. Newton with full cooperation of the book's author Joanne Greenberg. It was directed by Rick Bernstein, and premiered at Miners Alley Playhouse in Golden, Colorado to positive reviews in both Variety and The Denver Post. The play expanded on the original story by including new information about Dr. Frieda Fromm-Reichmann from Gail Hornstein's autobiography To Redeem One Person Is To Redeem The World. The play also restored the antisemitic and Jewish elements of the book that were removed from the film. Variety said "the dramatic arc is a compelling mix of personal, familial and professional themes that represents the actual events in a way the 1977 film does not. Newton's coup de grace, a multilayered denouement in which the fortunes of Deborah and Dr. Fried reverse, is an especially imaginative piece of writing". In 2013, a brief series of benefit performances was held in Golden, Colorado for the playwright, who himself suffered from a debilitating mental illness from 2011 until his death in 2022.
