= I Never Promised You a Rose Garden (novel) =

1964 novel by Joanne Greenberg

- Author: Joanne Greenberg
- Language: English
- Genre: Autobiographical novel
- Publisher: Holt, Rinehart & Winston
- Publication date: April 16, 1964
- Publication place: United States
- Pages: 291
- ISBN: 0-03-043725-3
- OCLC: 239462

I Never Promised You a Rose Garden (1964) is a semi-autobiographical novel by Joanne Greenberg, written under the pen name of Hannah Green. It served as the basis for a film in 1977 and a play in 2004.

== Plot summary ==
I Never Promised You a Rose Garden is a semi-autobiographical account of a teenage girl's three-year battle with schizophrenia. Deborah Blau, bright and artistically talented, has created a make-believe world, the Kingdom of Yr, as a form of defense from a confusing, frightening reality. When Deborah was five, she underwent surgery to remove a tumor in her urethra, a traumatic experience that involved a great deal of physical pain and shame. During her childhood, Deborah suffered frequent abuse from her anti-Semitic peers and neighbors. When Deborah first created Yr, it was a beautiful, comforting haven, but over time the gods of Yr became tyrannical dictators who controlled Deborah's every word and action.

The novel presents the issue of mental illness from multiple viewpoints. Deborah's three years in the hospital portray mental illness as it is experienced by the patient. Deborah's parents, Esther and Jacob, are torn between their love for their daughter and their shame at the stigma of her illness. Nevertheless, they find the courage to allow Deborah to continue treatment even when there are few signs of recovery for a long while. Deborah struggles with guilt and resentment at her parents' disappointment in her, while her younger sister Suzy copes with her frustration at having to arrange her life around Deborah's illness.

Deborah's therapist, Dr. Fried, slowly wins her trust and, over the course of three years, helps Deborah gain the courage to fight her illness. Her goal is to give Deborah the ability to choose the reality of Earth, despite all its faults and problems, over the phantoms of Yr. Meanwhile, Deborah develops friendships of a kind with the other patients in the hospital despite their fear of emotional investment in other people. Although she fears the reality of Earth, Deborah eventually earns a GED and resolves to win her struggle against her illness.

== Inspiration ==
The character of Dr. Fried is based closely on Greenberg's real doctor Frieda Fromm-Reichmann, and the hospital on Chestnut Lodge in Rockville, Maryland. While at Chestnut Lodge, Greenberg described a fantasy world called Iria to her doctors, quoting poetry in the Irian language. However, some of Greenberg's doctors felt that this was not a true delusion but rather something Greenberg had made up on the spot to impress her psychiatrist. One doctor went so far as to state that Irian was not an actual language, but was a form of bastardized Armenian. However, according to Gerald Schoenewolf, Irian was a conlang invented by Greenberg at an early age to prevent her father from reading her poetry, and had its own writing system resembling Chinese characters. Fromm-Reichmann wrote glowing reports focusing on Greenberg's genius and creativity, which she saw as signs of Greenberg's innate health, indicating that she had every chance of recovering from her mental illness.

Similar to what occurred in the novel, Greenberg was diagnosed with schizophrenia. At that time though, undifferentiated schizophrenia was often a vague diagnosis given to a patient or to medical records department for essentially non-medical reasons, which could have covered any number of mental illnesses from anxiety to depression.

Two psychiatrists who examined the book's description of protagonist Deborah Blau say that she was not schizophrenic, but rather suffered from extreme depression and somatization disorder.

== Film adaptation ==
In October 2026, Ashley Avis secured film rights to the novel and will write and direct a feature adaptation.

== See also ==
- The Mad Woman's 18 Years
