= Avenging Angel (1985 film) =

1985 film

- Theatrical release poster
- Directed by: Robert Vincent O'Neil
- Written by: Joseph Michael Cala; Robert Vincent O'Neill
- Produced by: Sandy Howard
- Starring: Betsy Russell; Rory Calhoun; Susan Tyrrell; Ossie Davis; Steven M. Porter; Robert F. Lyons; Frank Doubleday; Barry Pearl; Ross Hagen
- Cinematography: Peter Lyons Collister
- Edited by: John R. Bowey
- Music by: Christopher Young
- Production company: Republic Entertainment International
- Distributed by: New World Pictures
- Release date: January 11, 1985
- Running time: 93 minutes
- Country: United States
- Language: English
- Budget: $1.1 million
- Box office: $5,622,787

Avenging Angel is a 1985 American action thriller film directed by Robert Vincent O'Neil and written by O'Neil and Joseph Michael Cala. It stars Betsy Russell, Rory Calhoun, Robert F. Lyons, Ossie Davis and Susan Tyrrell.

The film is a sequel to Angel (1984) and was followed by Angel III: The Final Chapter (1988) and Angel 4: Undercover (1993). It is the second installment in the Angel film series

Rory Calhoun claimed Donna Wilkes did not reprise the role she had originated because the producers refused to pay her the salary she wanted.

== Plot ==
Molly Stewart (Betsy Russell) is off the streets and studying to become a lawyer.

Molly learns that Lt. Andrews (Robert F. Lyons), the detective who helped her leave prostitution when he became her legal guardian, was murdered. She returns to the streets as Angel to track down his killer and avenge his death. She enlists help from her old friends, Yoyo Charlie, Solly Mosler and Kit Carson and hunts for the sole witness, Johnny Glitter, to the crime.

They break Kit out of the sanitarium and find Johnny at his home just as the thugs who killed Andrews find him. Kit and Angel save Johnny in a shootout. Angel discovers a scheme to buy up Hollywood Boulevard by intimidation and violence that Gerrard perpetuates. Gerrard's men corner Kit, Solly, Angel and Johnny in an alley. Kit shoots the car and causes it to crash, and they capture Gerrard's son. The son gets loose and threatens them with a gun, but the phone rings and Kit shoots him to death.

The caller is Gerrard, who has kidnapped Solly's baby, Little Buck. Gerrard offers to trade Buck for his son. They attempt to make the trade despite the son's death, but Gerrard discovers the ruse. When he discovers his son has died, a shootout ensues and Gerrard takes the baby. Kit takes out one thug and Johnny Glitter, who shoots blind, shoots the other and also himself.

Angel confronts Gerrard on the top floor and Gerrard threatens to throw the baby down. Angel surrenders and Gerrard puts the baby down, but the baby crawls toward the edge. Gerrard will not allow Angel to move. Solly sees what is happening and goes up to shoot Gerrard.

Angel tries to get to the baby, but the baby falls. Kit sees the baby fall and catches him. Angel and Solly come down with the baby safely wrapped in Kit's jacket. The trio leaves just as the police arrived.

== Main cast ==
- Betsy Russell as Molly "Angel" Stewart
- Rory Calhoun as Kit Carson
- Susan Tyrrell as Solly Mosler
- Ossie Davis as Captain Harry Moradian
- Steven M. Porter as Charlie "Yo-Yo Charlie"
- Robert F. Lyons as Lieutenant Hugh Andrews
- Paul Lambert as Arthur Gerrard
- Frank Doubleday as Miles Gerrard
- Barry Pearl as Johnny Glitter
- Ross Hagen as Ray Mitchell
- Howard Honig as Sergeant Hal Baylor
- Liz Sheridan as Nurse
- Deborah Voorhees as Roxie (credited as Debi Sue Voorhees)
- Laura Burkett as Blonde Hooker
- Lynda Wiesmeier as Debbie
- Karin Mani as Janie Soon Lee
- Charlene Jones as Hooker
- Claudia Templeton as Claudia
- Jessica O'Neil as Little Buck

== Release ==
Avenging Angel went into production quickly after the success of its predecessor. Hoping to recreate the success of the first film, New World Pictures released the film on January 11, 1985, two days shy of the anniversary of the first film's release. The film was a box office disappointment for the company, opening in 10th place and eventually earning $5,622,787.

== Soundtrack ==
As Craig Safan was unavailable, Christopher Young composed the score for the film. In 1990, Intrada Records issued his music on a compilation CD including his work from Def-Con 4 (1985), Torment (1986) and The Telephone (1988); in 2013, BSX Records released a compilation album called The Angel Trilogy, featuring Young's score, Safan's music for Angel and Eric Allaman and Reinhard Scheuregger's music for Angel III: The Final Chapter.

== Home media ==
In 2003, Anchor Bay Entertainment released the Region 1 DVD box set of the first three Angel films entitled The Angel Collection.
