= Angel (1984 film) =

1984 American film by Robert Vincent O'Neil

- Theatrical release poster
- Directed by: Robert Vincent O'Neil
- Written by: Robert Vincent O'Neil; Joseph M. Cala
- Produced by: Roy Watts; Donald P. Borchers
- Starring: Cliff Gorman; Susan Tyrrell; Dick Shawn; Rory Calhoun; Donna Wilkes
- Cinematography: Andrew Davis
- Edited by: Charles Bornstein
- Music by: Craig Safan
- Production company: Adams Apple Film Company
- Distributed by: New World Pictures
- Release date: January 13, 1984
- Running time: 94 minutes
- Country: United States
- Language: English
- Budget: $1.3–3 million
- Box office: $17.5–20 million

Angel is a 1984 American exploitation thriller film directed by Robert Vincent O'Neil, written by O'Neil and Joseph M. Cala, and starring Cliff Gorman, Susan Tyrrell, Dick Shawn, Rory Calhoun and Donna Wilkes. The film follows a teenage prostitute in Los Angeles who faces danger when a serial killer begins stalking and murdering her colleagues.

Released by New World Pictures, it is the first installment in the Angel film series.

== Plot ==
Fifteen-year-old honor student Molly Stewart attends a private preparatory school in the Los Angeles area in the daytime. At night, she transforms herself into "Angel", a leather mini-skirted, high-heeled street teenage prostitute who works Hollywood Boulevard. Angel has a "street family" consisting of aging film cowboy Kit Carson, street performer Yoyo Charlie, drag performer Mae, fellow prostitutes Crystal and Lana, and her landlady, eccentric painter Solly Mosler.

The street's dangers increase as a necrophiliac serial killer who has no name begins to stalk and murder prostitutes. Los Angeles Police's Lt. Andrews is assigned to the case, but finds no leads. Tragedy strikes Angel's group of friends when Crystal becomes a victim.

The next day at school, Molly is confronted by teacher Patricia Allen, who is concerned about Molly's lack of extracurricular activities. Molly explains that her mother was paralyzed by a stroke and she has to head home immediately after school every day to care for her.

Lt. Andrews advises the prostitutes to work in pairs. Angel teams up with Lana. Lana takes a potential client to a motel room that she and Angel share. Later that night, when Angel arrives at the room with a client of her own, she finds Lana's body in the shower. Angel gives the police a description of the suspect and a composite sketch is made. The killer is brought in for a lineup and Angel recognizes him, but he shoots his way out of the police station and escapes.

Andrews takes Molly home to speak with her parents, but discovers that Molly's father left nine years earlier and her mother abandoned her three years earlier. Molly maintains the pretense of a mother at home so that she will not be sent to a foster home. She is convinced that her father will return someday. She has paid her rent, school tuition and living expenses through prostitution since she was 12.

Despite Andrews' warnings to stay off the street, Angel/Molly purchases a pistol and returns to work. Her masquerade falls apart that night when some classmates recognize her on the street. Word spreads through the students at her school and soon everyone knows that Molly spends her evenings as a Hollywood prostitute.

The next day, Ms. Allen visits Molly's apartment and insists on meeting her mother. Mae pretends to be Molly's mother, but Allen is not fooled. Mae is still at the apartment when the killer shows up later. They fight, and he stabs Mae, leaving her fatally wounded. Molly discovers Mae and the two share a tender moment of friendship before Mae succumbs to her wounds.

Andrews and Molly return to her apartment and find Mae's body. Molly heads out on the streets with Solly's handgun to avenge Mae and Andrews goes after her. After a fight and chase, Carson (whom Lt. Andrews reached out to so they could team up and find Angel in time) gets the drop on the killer and shoots him in the chest, killing him. Molly, Andrews and a wounded Carson walk off together.

== Cast ==
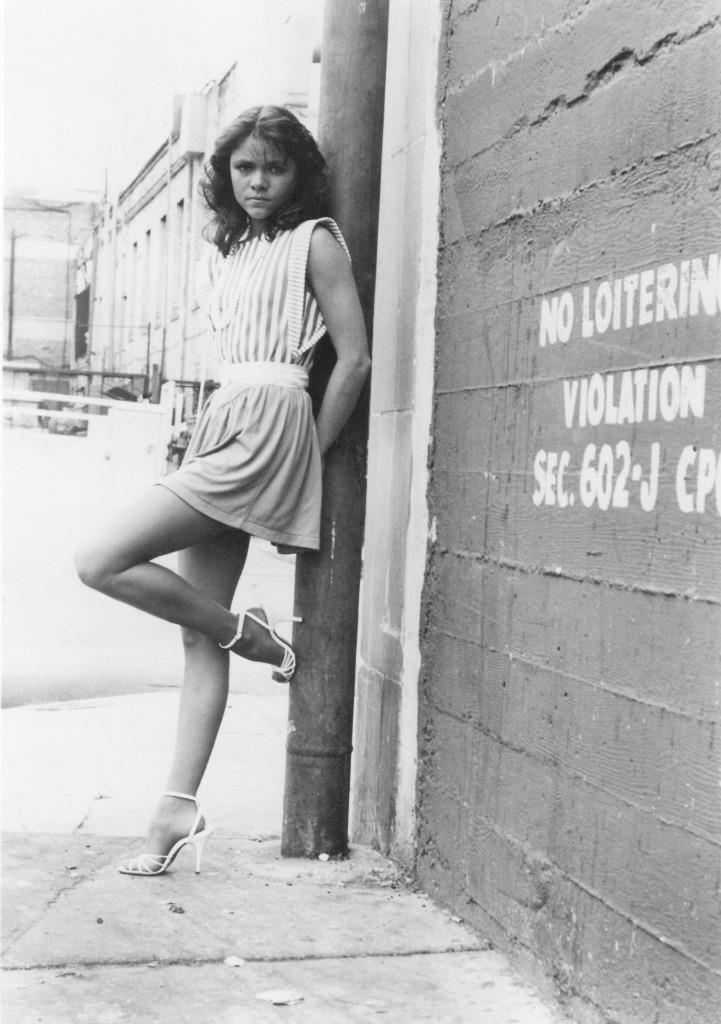
Promotional picture of Donna Wilkes

- Cliff Gorman as Lieutenant Andrews
- Susan Tyrrell as Solly Mosler
- Dick Shawn as Marvin Walker / Mae
- Rory Calhoun as Kit Carson
- Donna Wilkes as Molly "Angel" Stewart
- John Diehl as the killer
- Elaine Giftos as Patricia Allen
- Donna McDaniel as Crystal
- Graem McGavin as Lana
- Steven M. Porter as Charlie "Yoyo Charlie"

== Production ==
The film began as a story called Hollywood Starr, about a girl who, abandoned by her father, becomes a prostitute. She has to deal with a serial killer dressed as Santa who turns out to be her father. The story was written in treatment form by Robert Vincent O'Neil, author of Vice Squad, and Joe Cala.

They—which was originally just a treatment—impressed producer Sandy Howard who enlisted Don Borchers to produce. Borchers said Howard was inspired by the poster for the film Tootsie which showed Dustin Hoffman as a man and a woman; he wanted to show the lead character as a student and a prostitute on the poster.

Borchers had the story re-written by Robert Vincent O'Neil, influenced by stories of Damon Runyon. O'Neill said he wrote the script to specific locations on Hollywood Boulevard. The story was retitled Angel, which Borchers says was his idea.

Borchers received an offer to become head of production at New World Pictures and took Angel with him. O'Neill said "The idea was that when New World got the delivered print they had a movie about a 14-, 15-year-old hooker who never took her clothes off and never went to bed with anybody. On screen, that is."

Lead actress Donna Wilkes was actually 24 years old when she played 15-year-old Molly Stuart. She prepared for the role by talking to real-life street prostitutes on Hollywood Boulevard, spent time with the Los Angeles Police Department, and in various halfway houses for underage children living on the streets of Los Angeles.

According to Borchers, the part played by Susan Tyrell was originally written for a male actor but casting director Linda Francis suggested that Tyrell be cast instead.

Filming took place from June 1 to 28, 1983. The motel in the film is the El Royale Motel at 11117 Ventura Boulevard in Studio City. Most of the film was shot at real locations on and around Hollywood Boulevard.

Borchers said that Wilkes and Cliff Gorman did not get along, due to a conflict that originated during the taping of a pilot for the sitcom Hello, Larry on which both were cast. Gorman would tease Wilkes about her height and she would mock him for his glass eye; this cumulated in Gorman chasing Wilkes until she ran to her dressing room and he smashed the door in. Gorman was fired from the sitcom, replaced by McLean Stevenson. Angel was the first time both actors had worked together since then. When Wilkes and Gorman found out they would be working with each other, Borchers offered Gorman the chance to leave the project, but the actor did not as he needed the money (they considered Wilkes more essential to the film). Borchers discovered that Gorman swapped a real gun in for a prop gun in a scene where someone was meant to be shooting a prop gun at Wilkes; he wanted to call the police but was persuaded not to as the film would have had to shut down.

The producer said the film cost around $1.5 million and was sold to HBO for $4 million, in part because of the recent ratings success of the television film Little Ladies of the Night on NBC.

O'Neil said Wilkes "was just terrific to work with", but she was not cast in the sequel because "her agent was asking an outrageous price and pissed Sandy off and he wouldn't even talk to them" so he cast Betsy Russell who "did not have the vulnerability that Donna has... That's what was missing, you know. So Avenging Angel was not the film Angel was, unfortunately."

O'Neil recalled, "I used two cameras every chance I got. Almost all scenes with Dick Shawn because I couldn't get him to do a scene the same way twice. With him it was like catching lightning in a bottle. I learned that the first day of shooting with him."

Borchers said in the original cut of the film Rory Calhoun's character was supposed to die. However, test audiences did not like the ending where Angel killed the serial killer, so scenes were added where Calhoun's character returned to shoot the killer.

The film premiered at the Hollywood Pacific Theatre on Hollywood Boulevard. A fact sheet inside the theatre, prior to its closure in 1994, confirmed this. The theatre is also featured in the climax of the film, when a gun-toting Angel opens fire on the killer and terrifies the patrons outside.

== Music ==
=== Soundtrack ===
Composer Craig Safan wrote the film's score in less than a week. The score was released on compact disc by Intrada Records in 1993. In 2013, BSX Records released a compilation album called The Angel Trilogy, featuring Safan's album programme (plus a cover version of the Allies' "Something Sweet" as performed by Melody Michalski), Christopher Young's score for Avenging Angel (also previously released by Intrada), and Eric Allaman and Reinhard Scheuregger's music for Angel III: The Final Chapter.

== Release ==
=== Theatrical ===
Angel was released in theaters in the United States by New World Pictures on January 13, 1984.

=== Box office ===
The film failed to open in the top 5 at the box office, yet grossed $2.2 million on its opening weekend. The film stayed in the box-office top ten for several months, becoming a sleeper hit and eventually earning $17,488,564. It was New World's highest-grossing picture that year.

=== Home video ===
In 2003, Anchor Bay Entertainment released the Region 1 DVD box set of the first three Angel films entitled The Angel Collection, and is also available on Blu-ray from Vinegar Syndrome.

== Sequels ==
The film's cult following and box-office profits were enough to spawn two sequels, although each with a different actress. The sequels were Avenging Angel (1985), starring Betsy Russell, and Angel III: The Final Chapter (1988), starring Mitzi Kapture. Each film performed less well at the box office. A failed pilot for a TV spin-off was released directly to video as Angel 4: Undercover (1993), starring Darlene Vogel, but was a standalone sequel to the previous films.
