= The Human Factor (1975 film) =

- Theatrical poster
- Directed by: Edward Dmytryk
- Written by: Peter Powell; Thomas Hunter
- Produced by: Frank Avianca
- Starring: George Kennedy; John Mills; Raf Vallone; Rita Tushingham; Haydee Politoff
- Cinematography: Ousama Rawi
- Edited by: Alan Strachan
- Music by: Ennio Morricone
- Production companies: Eton; Avianca Features
- Distributed by: Bryanston Distribution (US); Rank Films (UK); Columbia Pictures (International)
- Release dates: 19 November 1975 (US); 27 June 1976 (UK)
- Running time: 96 minutes
- Countries: United Kingdom; United States; Italy
- Language: English

The "Human" Factor is a 1975 suspense-thriller film directed by Edward Dmytryk and starring George Kennedy, John Mills, Raf Vallone, Rita Tushingham, Barry Sullivan, and Haydee Politoff. A young Danny Huston appears in his acting debut. The UK/US/Italy co-production was shot on-location in Naples. The soundtrack was by composer Ennio Morricone. It was Dmytryk's final theatrically released film.

== Plot ==
John Kinsdale is an American NATO computer specialist living with his wife and two children in Naples, Italy. Trying to find a new housekeeper, he calls the number in an ad in the domestics section of a local English-language newspaper. When Kinsdale arrives home from work, he finds his family brutally murdered and the perpetrators nowhere in sight. The sudden tragedy nearly drives him to suicide, but upon seeing a television report on the deaths he instead resolves to avenge his family's murder.

After the funeral, Kinsdale is visited by Inspector Lupo of the Carabinieri, who is coordinating investigation efforts with the U.S. State Department. Lupo tells Kinsdale that hair strands at the crime scene identify the suspect as a redheaded male, between the ages of 25 and 45. Kinsdale steals U.S. Embassy credentials from Lupo, before meeting with his colleagues Janice Tilman and Mike McAllister. With McAllister, he runs the suspect's description and the analytics of their hair sample through a NATO database, and finds two possible suspects: Americans Andrew Taylor, who has disappeared, and Eddy Fonseca. Kinsdale tracks down Fonseca to the Pompeian ruins, but quickly rules him out when it becomes apparent he's just a tourist.

Another American family is killed under similar circumstances, so Kinsdale travels to the crime scene using his stolen credentials, where he meets an Embassy worker named George Edmonds. After a few drinks at a local bar, Edmonds discloses that the U.S. President received a letter several weeks ago demanding the release of a group of political prisoners and $10 million, or every three days an American family living in Italy will be murdered. The first two deadlines have already passed, with the third fast approaching.

Meanwhile, Lupo is briefed by a CIA agent about the suspected perpetrators behind the murders; Taylor and known terrorist Kamal Hamshari. Lupo talks to Edmonds about Fonseca, believing it was Edmonds who interviewed the man, as he is the only other person with credentials at the embassy. Edmonds describes the man he met and mentions he also had a pass, prompting Lupo to realize it was Kinsdale. Upon returning to Naples, Kinsdale is confronted by McAllister, who realizes Kinsdale plans to kill Taylor and produces a computer prediction that only gives Kinsdale an eight per cent chance of success.

Through the same newspaper his wife read, Kinsdale realizes that the terrorists are targeting families who answer to a domestic want ad. Claiming he is surveying the effectiveness of the classified advertisements, Kinsdale learns that the Gerardi family has just made an appointment to talk to a prospective housecleaner, Miss Pidgeon. Before Kinsdale can leave, Inspector Lupo arrives to arrest him, but Kinsdale flees and manages to evade capture. That night, he breaks into the Geraldi residence armed with a gun and orders them to cooperate. When Miss Pidgeon arrives at the door, her suspicions are immediately raised and her men open fire on the house, but flee when Kinsdale returns fire, accidentally leaving behind a purse.

Kinsdale goes to Janice's apartment, where he is promptly berated by McAllister for not going to the police and risking the lives of the other targeted families., but Kinsdale retorts that he will not allow the killers to be imprisoned just so another group can hold the U.S. hostage. Searching Pidgeon's purse, he finds a napkin with the name of a café printed on it. Going to the cafe, he finds the killers' van and spots Taylor walking outside. He gets in his car, follows Taylor down an alley, hits him with his car and then beats him bloody. Taylor stabs him with a switchblade knife, but Kinsdale disarms him, then strangles Taylor to death with a steel chain. Bleeding, Kinsdale returns to the garage, breaks into the upstairs apartment and discovers his daughter's doll and a phone number.

CIA agents ambush Kinsdale, but see his stolen credentials and assume he's a State Department investigator, giving him a ride back to the embassy. Back at the base, Kamal, posing as a deliveryman, drives a small truck, with Pidgeon and ten armed men inside. They enter a closed Post Exchange building, kill the janitor and hide. When the exchange opens, they take the customers hostage and order the store manager to deliver a ransom letter to authorities. At the U.S. Embassy, Kinsdale asks a woman to dial the phone number he found. When he discovers it is for the Post Exchange, he steals a car, drives onto the base and crashes through the front windows of the building. He leaps out, shoots a number of terrorists and is wounded, but manages to knock down another killer. He pulls off one of the terrorists' masks to reveal Pidgeon, who spits in his face before he shoots her between the eyes. Another gunman takes aim on Kinsdale, but a female hostage picks up a machine gun and kills the man. Kamal takes another hostage, but Kinsdale keeps shooting, forcing Kamal to run outside. Kinsdale follows and guns his wife's killer down, then falls to his knees. Inspector Lupo and Mike McAllister take the empty pistol from Kinsdale's hands as he sobs.

== Cast ==
- George Kennedy as John Kinsdale
- John Mills as Mike McAllister
- Raf Vallone as Inspector Lupo
- Rita Tushingham as Janice Tilman
- Barry Sullivan as George Edmonds
- Arthur Franz as General Fuller
- Haydee Politoff as Miss Pidgeon
- Tom Hunter as Andrew Taylor
- Frank Avianca as Kamal Hamshari
- Shane Rimmer as Carter
- Fiamma Verges as Ann Kinsdale
- Danny Huston as Mark Kinsdale
- Ricky Harrison as Jeffrey Kinsdale
- Hillary Lief as Linda Kinsdale
- Michael Mandeville as Phillips
- Mark Lowell as Eddy Fonseca
- Jan Englund as Agnes Fonseca
- Lewis Charles as Christopher Geraldi
- Corinne Dunne as Corinne Geraldi
- Vincenzo Crocitti as Marco

== Reception ==
The Monthly Film Bulletin wrote: "Another sample ... of the recent trend in vigilante movies, which have transferred their crude political schema from the domestic impasse created by organised crime and corrupt law enforcement to the sphere of international terrorism. Militant young radicals, typically suffering from too much money, too much education, "psychological imbalances" and "political messiah" complexes display mechanised efficiency and cold-blooded fanaticism (but little political idealism) in striking at the very heart of humanity, i.e the. domestic security of a global middle-class. ...Not for the first time in Dmytryk, a kind of Germanic over-drive seems emotionally to be forcing his subject on further than it is capable of going; though there is an intensity of pain in Kinsdale's frustrated act of banging his fists on a chair, then silently howling over the forgotten knife wound in his hand, which has more impact than his protractedly gruesome destruction of the first terrorist. Although it mitigates the dishonesty of the material not a jot, such embittered passion is given its full due by the film, all the way to a biblical epilogue."

TV Guide wrote: "Director Dmytryk and writers Hunter and Powell ignore any political, social, or emotional aspects of the material and play directly to the viewer's blood-lust instincts".
