= Cliff Gorman =

American actor (1936–2002)

- Gorman in An Unmarried Woman (1978)
- Born: Joel Joshua Goldberg; October 13, 1936; Queens, New York City, U.S.
- Died: September 5, 2002 (aged 65); Manhattan, New York City, U.S.
- Occupation: Actor
- Years active: 1968–2002
- Spouse: Gayle Gorman (m. 1963)

Joel Joshua Goldberg (October 13, 1936 – September 5, 2002), known professionally as Cliff Gorman, was an American actor. He won an Obie Award in 1968 for the stage presentation of The Boys in the Band, and went on to reprise his role in the 1970 film version.

== Life and career ==
Gorman was born Joel Joshua Goldberg in Queens, New York, the son of Jewish parents, Ethel (née Kaplan) and Samuel Goldberg, who later changed their surname to Gorman. He attended the High School of Music & Art in Manhattan.

Gorman won a Tony Award in 1972 for playing Lenny Bruce in the play Lenny. Although the film version, directed by Bob Fosse, featured Dustin Hoffman, Gorman was recruited to portray a Dustin Hoffman-like character portraying Lenny Bruce in a side-story in Fosse's autobiographical film All That Jazz (1979).

He was originally cast as the lead in the 1978 sitcom Hello, Larry, but was replaced by McLean Stevenson after Gorman was involved in an altercation with costar Donna Wilkes. This bad blood between Gorman and Wilkes would spill over onto the production of the 1984 film Angel, where Wilkes was the lead, and Gorman had a supporting role as Lt. Andrews.

He played Joseph Goebbels in the 1981 television film The Bunker. He had roles in the films Cops and Robbers (1973), Rosebud (1975), Brinks: The Great Robbery (1976), An Unmarried Woman (1978) with Jill Clayburgh, Night of the Juggler (1980), Hoffa (1992) with Jack Nicholson and Danny DeVito, and Night and the City (1992). His TV work included performances in the series Law and Order, Murder, She Wrote, Friday the 13th: the Series, and the 1970s drama Police Story, written by former LAPD Detective Sergeant Joseph Wambaugh.

On the September 13, 1965 episode of To Tell The Truth, Gorman sat in seat #1 as an imposter for game #3 of the evening. He received two votes, one from Orson Bean, and one from Kitty Carlisle. When asked what he actually did for a living, he responded that he sold room air conditioners for the Republic Water Heater Company.

== Personal life ==
Gorman was married to Gayle Stevens Gorman from May 31, 1963 until his death. He and his wife cared for his fellow The Boys in the Band cast member Robert La Tourneaux in the last few months of his battle against AIDS, until La Tourneaux's death on June 3, 1986.

== Death ==
On September 5, 2002, Gorman died of leukemia at the age of 65 at his home in Manhattan.

== Filmography ==
Year	Title	Role	Notes
1968	N.Y.P.D.	Hickey	S2.E1 - "Naked in the Streets"
1969	Justine	"Toto"	
1970	The Boys in the Band	Emory	
1970	Dan August	Harry Russell	S1.E13 - "Passing Fair"
1973	Cops and Robbers	Tom	
1973	Class of '63	Mickey Swerner	ABC Movie of the Week
1974-75	Police Story	Sgt. Billy Humm	2 episodes
1975	Medical Story	Dr. Frank Duffy	S1.E5 - "An Air Full of Death"
1975	Rosebud	Yafet Hamlekh	Directed by Otto Preminger
1975	The Silence	Stanley Greenberg	TV film
1975	Strike Force	Detective Joey Gentry	TV film
1976	Hawaii Five-O	Robert Huston	S9.E5 - "Tour De Force, Killer Aboard"
1976	Brinks: The Great Robbery	Danny Conforti	TV film
1977	Having Babies II	Arthur Magee	TV film
1977	The Streets of San Francisco	Sgt. Eddy Earl Mack	S5.E23 - "Time Out"
1978	An Unmarried Woman	Charlie	
1979	All That Jazz	Davis Newman	
1980	Night of the Juggler	Gus Soltic	
1981	The Bunker	Joseph Goebbels	TV film
1982	Trapper John, M.D.	Brad Wylie	2 episodes
1983	Cocaine and Blue Eyes	Riki Anatole	TV film
1984	Angel	Lieutenant Andrews	
1985	Half Nelson	Actor	S1.E2 - "Uppers and Downers"
1985	Doubletake	Aaron	TV miniseries
1985	The Paper Chase	Mr. Garrett	S3.E12 - "Lasting Impressions"
1986-92	Murder, She Wrote	NYPD Lt. Parnell	2 episodes
1987	Friday the 13th: The Series	Dr. Vincent Howlett	S1.E7 - "Doctor Jack"
1987	Cagney & Lacey	Robert B. Roberts	S7.E7 - "Greed"
1988	Spenser: For Hire	Joey	S3.E15 - "The Big Fight"
1989	Howard Beach: Making a Case for Murder	Bernstein	TV film
1990	Vestige of Honor	Sanderson	TV film
1992	Terror on Track 9	Sgt. Aaron Greenberg	TV film
1992	Night and the City	Phil Nasseros	
1992	Hoffa	Soloman "Solly" Stein	
1993	The Return of Ironside	Joe McManus	TV film
1994	Janek: The Forget-Me-Not Murders	Aaron	TV film
1995	New York News	Actor	S1.E13 - "The Using Game"
1995	Down Came a Blackbird	Nick the Greek	TV film
1996	Desert Breeze		TV film
1998	Law & Order	Trial Judge Gary Feldman	3 episodes
1999	Ghost Dog: The Way of the Samurai	Sonny Valerio	
1999	The '60s: The Complete Miniseries	Father Daniel Berrigan	TV miniseries
2000	King of the Jungle	Jack	
2003	Kill the Poor	Yakov	Posthumous release
