= Floyd Levine =

American actor (1932–2025)

- Born: February 23, 1932; New York City, U.S.
- Died: August 24, 2025 (aged 93); Los Angeles, California, U.S.
- Occupation: Actor
- Years active: 1972–2012
- Children: 2, including Brian Robbins

Floyd Levine (February 23, 1932 – August 24, 2025) was an American actor known for his appearances in numerous television shows and films.

== Life and career ==
Levine played Dr. Ralph Harris in the 1978 film Bloodbrothers. He also played Gen. Duncan in the 1988 film Braddock: Missing in Action III and Lt. Mellin in the 1988 film Angel III: The Final Chapter.

Levine guest-starred in numerous television programs including Quincy, M.E., Hill Street Blues, Hart to Hart, Charlie's Angels, The Love Boat, Police Squad!, Three's Company, The A-Team, The Dukes of Hazzard, Head of the Class, Columbo and Archie Bunker's Place. He also appeared in a few episodes of Cagney & Lacey, Manimal, Crazy Like a Fox, Cousin Skeeter and Arliss.

Levine died in Los Angeles on August 24, 2025, at the age of 93.

== Filmography ==
=== Film ===
Year	Title	Role	Notes
1972	Come Back, Charleston Blue	Truck Driver	Uncredited
1972	Super Fly	Police	
1974	Death Wish	Desk Sergeant	
1975	Dog Day Afternoon	Phone Cop	
1975	Abduction	Off-Duty Cop	
1976	The Death Collector	Kruger	
1978	Blood Relatives	Dr. Harris	Uncredited
1978	A Death in Canaan	Thomas Lanza	Televisiom movie
1978	Bloodbrothers	Dr. Ralph Harris	
1979	Sergeant T.K. Yu	—N/a	Television movie
1980	Baby Comes Home	Louis Zambello	Televisiom movie
1981	Margin for Murder	Machetti	Television movie
1981	A Long Way Home	Judge Sosna	Television movie
1982	The Border	Lou	
1982	Portrait of a Showgirl	Selwyn	Television movie
1982	Night Shift	Sal Carboni	
1982	Farrell for the People	Judge Shafner	Television movie
1982	Airplane II: The Sequel	Hallick	
1983	The Young Landlords	Salesman	Television movie
1983	Malibu	Mr. X.	Television movie
1983	Curse of the Pink Panther	Deputy Commissioner	
1986	Knights of the City	McGruder	
1988	Braddock: Missing in Action III	General Duncan	
1988	Cellar Dweller	Taxi Driver	
1988	Lady Mobster	Mob Boss #2	Television movie
1988	Angel III: The Final Chapter	Lieutenant Mellin	
1990	Repossessed	Frank Lot	
1993	DaVinci's War	Mcg. Tammasino	
1994	Ice	Detective Prine	
1995	To the Limit	Father Rich	
1996	Norma Jean & Marilyn	Spyros Skouras	Television movie
1997	Good Burger	Ice Cream Man	
1997	Pterodactyl Woman from Beverly Hills	Golf Partner	
1998	Watchers 4	Captain Dekker	
1998	Babylon 5: Thirdspace	Alex	Television movie
2000	Ready to Rumble	Floor Manager	
2005	Coach Carter	Taxi Driver	
2007	Norbit	Abe / The Tailor	
2008	Meet Dave	Old Man On Toilet	
2009	The Hangover	The Tailor	
2012	A Thousand Words	Man On Pier	Final film role

=== Television ===
Year	Title	Role	Notes
1976–1977	Kojak	Thompson / Nelson Hewett	2 episodes
1977	The Hardy Boys/Nancy Drew Mysteries	Brandon	2 episodes
1977	Eight Is Enough	Sam Wickes / Officer Dudley	2 episodes
1978	Baretta	Gazik	Episode: "It's a Boy"
1978	Starsky & Hutch	Boyle	Episode: "Hutchinson for Murder One"
1978	Husbands, Wives & Lovers	Mr. Howard	Episode: "Dixon and Courtney Adopt"
1978	Kaz	Irving	2 episodes
1978	The Eddie Capra Mysteries	Lieutenant Steinmetz 1978 'And the Sea Shall Give up Her Dead'	2 episodes
1978	Wonder Woman	Stryker	Episode: "Gault's Brain"
1979	Quincy, M.E.	Major Levy	Episode: "Semper-Fidelis"
1979	Mrs. Columbo	—N/a	Episode: "Falling Star"
1980	Tenspeed and Brown Shoe	Mark Trousdale	Episode: "The Millionaire's Life"
1980	Hart to Hart	Lieutenant Beckerman	Episode: "Death Set"
1981	Nero Wolfe	Lieutenant Gray	Episode: "Wolfe at the Door"
1981	Archie Bunker's Place	Painter	Episode: "Goodbye, Murray"
1981	Charlie's Angels	Norman Powers	Episode: "Mr. Galaxy"
1981	Jacqueline Susann's Valley of the Dolls	Dr. Corey	Miniseries
1982	Police Squad!	Cooper	Episode: "Ring of Fear (A Dangerous Assignment)"
1982	Hill Street Blues	Petowski	Episode: "Heat Rash"
1983	The A-Team	Carmine	Episode: "The Rabbit Who Ate Las Vegas"
1983	The Powers of Matthew Star	Sheldon Pinkster	Episode: "The Great Waldo Shepherd"
1983	Matt Houston	Dr. Osgood	Episode: "Love You to Death"
1983	Three's Company	Security Officer	Episode: "The Money Machine"
1983–1984	Cagney & Lacey	Desk Sergeant Lubin	3 episodes
1983	The Love Boat	Pete	Episode: "Rhino of the Year/One Last Time/For Love or Money"
1983	Manimal	Murdock	3 episodes
1983	T.J. Hooker	Garber	Episode: "Blue Murder"
1984	The New Mike Hammer	Jack Belson	Episode: "Hot Ice"
1984	The Master	Sam	Episode: "Fat Tuesday"
1984	Automan	Seymour Grodkin	Episode: "Murder, Take One"
1984	The Dukes of Hazzard	Mr. Baldwin	Episode: "The Dukes in Hollywood"
1985	Knight Rider	Oscar	Episode: "Knight by a Nose"
1985–1986	Crazy Like a Fox	Cecil	3 episodes
1985–1989	Murder, She Wrote	Archie Miles / Harry Krumholtz	2 episodes
1985	Days of Our Lives	Lou Stanley	2 episodes
1985	George Burns Comedy Week	—N/a	Episode: "The Smiths"
1986	Sledge Hammer!	Desk Sergeant	Episode: "They Shoot Hammers, Don't They?"
1988	She's the Sheriff	Louie	Episode: "Down for the Count"
1989	Head of the Class	Judge	Episode: "The Little Sister"
1990	Columbo	Lieutenant Schultz	Television movie
1991	Equal Justice	Dr. Yung	Episode: "Sleeping with the Enemy"
1992	Lady Boss	Bruce	Miniseries
1992	Sinatra	The Director	2 episode
1996	Sports Theater with Shaquille O'Neal	Johnny Battles	2 episodes
1996–1998	Arliss	August Boyer III	2 episodes
1996–1998	Kenan & Kel	Nate / Floyd	3 episodes
1996	Mad About You	Artie Zeitlin	Episode: "Burt's Building"
1996–1997	Melrose Place	Dr. Howard Stein	6 episodes
1998	Baywatch	Crime Gang Boss	Episode: "Bon Voyage"
1998–2000	Cousin Skeeter	Ned / The Doorman	3 episodes
2000	The Amanda Show	Taxi Driver	Episode 10
2000	Bull	—N/a	Episode: "In the Course of Human Events"
2001	18 Wheels of Justice	—N/a	Episode: "Amore... Omerta"
2001	The Nightmare Room	Delivery Man	Episode: "Full Moon Halloween"; Final television role
