= Grotesque (1988 film) =

- Theatrical release poster
- Directed by: Joe Tornatore
- Screenplay by: Mikel Angel
- Story by: Joe Tornatore
- Produced by: Mike Lane; Chuck Morrell
- Starring: Linda Blair; Tab Hunter; Donna Wilkes; Charles Dierkop; Guy Stockwell
- Cinematography: Billy Dickson
- Edited by: Bob Nielsen
- Music by: Jack Cookerly; William Loose
- Production company: United Filmmakers
- Distributed by: Empire Pictures
- Release date: 1988
- Running time: 89 minutes
- Country: United States
- Language: English

Grotesque is a 1988 American horror film by Joe Tornatore, and starring Linda Blair, Tab Hunter, and Donna Wilkes. Blair also served as associate producer. It follows a deformed son, the titular "Grotesque" who avenges the brutal murder of his family members by a gang of punks, which took place at the family's vacation home. It was filmed at Big Bear Lake, California.

== Plot ==
Film special effects artist Orville Kruger brings his daughter, Lisa, and her friend, Kathy, to the family's remote country house in the San Bernardino Mountains. En route, Lisa and Kathy are harassed by a gang of punks driving a Volkswagen van, led by Scratch, who is planning to rob the Krugers' home. Scratch and his group are on the run after committing a robbery and mass murder of a family in Nevada.

Lisa and Kathy arrive at the house, where Lisa's mother informs them that Lisa's uncle Rod, a plastic surgeon, is arriving the next day. In conversation, Lisa has a conversation with her mother about how "Patrick" is doing, and Orville later plays a prank on the girls using his special effects creations. That night, Lisa and Kathy are awoken by Scratch and his gang, who hold the family hostage and threaten them, demanding they give the gang their valuables. When Orville states they have none, the gang bludgeons him to death with a log before killing Lisa's mother. From behind a glass slot in a wall, a pair of eyes look on as the gang brutalize the Krugers.

The gang begins a rape attempt against Kathy before a female member of the criminals stabs her to death. Lisa manages to escape the house and flees on foot. The gang proceeds to ransack the house before departing, and finds a hidden room decorated like a nursery. A hideously deformed man—revealed to be Lisa's adopted brother, Patrick, murders two of the gang members before the rest flee into the woods. Scratch and his girlfriend, Shelley, decide they will fight Patrick. At dawn, Lisa is attacked by one of the gangsters, but Patrick arrives and saves her, killing him.

Rod arrives at the house and finds police there, who suspect the missing Lisa may have committed the murders. Lisa is later found unconscious in the woods by authorities. Meanwhile, Scratch and Shelley come face to face with Patrick, who attempts to kill them, but he is subsequently shot dead by police. Lisa, suffering a blood clot, is hospitalized, while Scratch and Shelley falsely claim to have been innocent victims of Patrick. Lisa subsequently dies during an emergency operation; with the only witness to the crime now dead, Scratch and Shelley are due to be released by police.

Rod tells authorities that the deformed and deranged Patrick was abandoned as a child and raised by the Krugers, who kept him contained to ensure he would not hurt anyone. Upon realizing that Scratch and Shelley are to be freed, he rents two surgical tables and procures a shotgun. Outside the jail, Rod kidnaps the two and drives them back to the Krugers' country home. In a makeshift operating room, Rod reveals that he too is deformed, removing a mask made by his brother Orville to conceal his facial deformity. Rod surgically mutilates Scratch and Shelley before locking them inside Patrick's soundproof nursery.

The events are subsequently shown not to be real, but a test screening of a feature film hosted by the Frankenstein Monster and the Wolfman. The Frankenstein Monster and the Wolfman burst into the screening room, frightening the audience.

== Cast ==
- Linda Blair as Lisa
- Tab Hunter as Rod
- Donna Wilkes as Kathy
- Guy Stockwell as Orville Kruger
- Brad Wilson as "Scratch"
- Nels Van Patton as Gibbs
- Charles Dierkop as Matson
- Luana Patten as Old Lady
- Robert Z'Dar as Eric
- Sharon Hughes as Donna
- Michelle Bensoussan as Shelly
- Chuck Morrell as Jim Fulton
- Lincoln Tate as Blane
- Bunky Jones as Belle
- Bob Apisa as Patrick
- Alva Megowan as Malinda
- Ray Sterling as Pete
- Tracy Hutchinson as Sandy
- Don Tornatore as Ghoul
- Jeff Richard as Wolf Mann
- Stacy Alden as Young Lady
- Chuck Foster as Hunter
- Joe Tornatore as Charlie
- Mike Lane as Frank N. Stien

== Reception ==
Joe Corey, of Inside Pulse, wrote, "The movie gets weird with a rather arty finale about cinema and reality. This isn’t so much Grotesque as Perplexed". Stuart Galbraith IV, writing for DVD Talk, said that "the picture is a time-wasting jumble of half-baked ideas, overcooked performances (the actors playing punks are ridiculously overwrought throughout), and herky-jerky pacing".

Paul Pritchard, of DVD Verdict, wrote that "Grotesque makes yet another shift as it becomes an early entry into the torture porn genre, before ending in total farce, as it makes one final genre shift into comedy". A review in VideoHound's Cult Flicks & Trash Pics said that the film is "played too straight to be funny and too badly to be shocking".

== Home media ==
Grotesque was released in a DVD set with three other low-budget films – Lady Frankenstein, The Velvet Vampire, and Time Walker. While the other films in the set have special features, this film does not. It is the only film in the set that is full frame, which a reviewer for DVD Talk said that it "appears to be an ancient video transfer, one that might even pre-date the dawn of DVD".
