= Cops and Robbers (1973 film) =

1973 film by Aram Avakian

- Promotional movie poster
- Directed by: Aram Avakian
- Written by: Donald E. Westlake
- Produced by: Elliott Kastner; George Pappas
- Starring: Cliff Gorman; Joseph Bologna
- Cinematography: David L. Quaid
- Edited by: Barry Malkin
- Music by: Michel Legrand
- Distributed by: United Artists
- Release dates: August 15, 1973 (New York City); August 17, 1973 (U.S.)
- Running time: 89 minutes
- Country: United States
- Language: English

Cops and Robbers playing at a Minneapolis movie theater

Cops and Robbers is a 1973 crime comedy film directed by Aram Avakian with an original screenplay by Donald E. Westlake which he subsequently expanded into a novel. The film stars Cliff Gorman and Joseph Bologna as Tom and Joe, two corrupt New York City Police Department (NYPD) officers who plan a heist to fund an early retirement for each.

== Plot ==
NYPD Detective Tom Loomis and Officer Joe Fortunato are working class neighbors in a high-density residential community in Queens. Though they have rather content lives with families and homes, Tom and Joe are unhappy with their dangerous policing jobs that offer little pay, and seek more money for a better lifestyle.

One night, Joe robs a liquor store while in uniform and simply walks away. Realizing the potential in using his police powers to commit more financially-lucrative crimes, Joe tells Tom, who agrees with the prospect of the pair abusing their authority to commit a heist so they can finally leave the NYPD. Tom visits the house of a mobster seeking an offer for a heist worth $2 million; the mobster ultimately informs them of $10 million worth of bearer bonds at a Wall Street brokerage house and offers a $2 million cut of the earnings if they can successfully steal them. After Tom meets with the mobster, the mafia, suspicious of Tom's intentions and police identity, tries to trail Tom into the New York City Subway, but Joe manages to hold up a line, allowing both to escape in the crowd.

Tom and Joe decide to rob the brokerage house in patrol uniforms during a ticker-tape parade for returning NASA astronauts, but after stealing the bonds, they rip them up and throw them out of a window alongside the ticker tape. This idea is the key component to the whole heist: as the stolen bonds no longer physically exist, no one will find them. During the robbery, the executive of the brokerage house robbed by the duo snags $2 million for himself, and the media reports $12 million was stolen.

Tom and Joe flee in police cars into a section of Central Park where only bicycles and emergency vehicles are allowed, where they are intended to collect their $2 million payout, but the pickup is revealed to be a trap by the mob. However, the pair survive the trap and flee with the $2 million, while the mobster is killed for his failures.

== Cast ==
- Cliff Gorman as NYPD Detective Tom Loomis
- Joseph Bologna as NYPD Officer Joe Fortunato
- Delphi Lawrence as Rich Lady
- Charlene Dallas as Secretary
- John P. Ryan as Pasquale "Patsy" Aniello
- Dolph Sweet as George
- Joe Spinell as Marty
- Shepperd Strudwick as Mr. Eastpoole
- James Ferguson as Liquor Store Clerk
- Frances Foster as Bleeding Lady
- Richard Ward as NYPD Officer Paul Jones
- Gayle Gorman as Mary
- Walt Gorney as Wino
- George Harris II as Harry
- Ellen Holly as Ms. Wells
- Randy Jurgensen as Randy
- Albert Henderson as Cop
- Martin Kove as Ambulance Attendant

== Additional information ==
This film was also released under the following titles:

- Entimotatoi kleftes – Greece (transliterated ISO-LATIN-1 title)
- Flics et voyous – France
- Polícias e Ladrões – Portugal
- Rosvot ja jeparit – Finland
- Se ci provi... io ci sto! – Italy
- Snutar som robbar – Sweden
- Treffpunkt Central Park – West Germany
- Unos policías muy ladrones – Spain
- Lögreglumenn á glapstigum - Iceland

== Reception ==
Pauline Kael for The New Yorker wrote that the "freshest, most contemporary element [of the move] is that the cops commit a robbery to get away from the hell and hopelessness of trying to keep law and order."

Roger Greenspun wrote a favorable review of the film for the New York Times saying "If anybody had told me even a week ago about a funny, exciting, semi-plausible, exceptionally intelligent caper movie, I would not have believed him. "Cops and Robbers," despite its title, and despite the slightly dumb-dumb ad campaign that is introducing it, is all those good things and more. It is uncommonly well acted. And it is the first movie in a long time to understand, rather than merely to exploit, its New York City locales."

== Soundtrack ==
The score was composed and conducted by Michel Legrand. The soundtrack was released exclusively on compact disc in August 2009.

Track List:

- Main Title (Cops and Robbers)
- The Sellers
- Uptown
- The Buyer
- Suburbia
- Downtown
- Wall Street
- Papa Joe, The Padrone
- The Caper
- The Lush Life
- The Chase
- The Sleep Song
- The Chase (alternate version)

== See also ==
- List of American films of 1973
