= Anna Navarro =

American film and television actress (1933–2006)

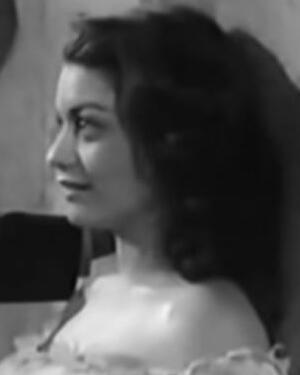
- Navarro in Time Table (1956)
- Born: Anna Delia Navarro; August 18, 1933; New York, U.S. or Nicaragua or Winter Park, Florida, U.S.
- Died: December 27, 2006 (aged 73)
- Occupations: Film and television actress
- Spouses: Thomas Francis Foley III (m. 1958; div. 1966) George Pappas (m. 1976; div. 1986)
- Children: 2

Anna Delia Navarro (also cited Ana Delia Navarro; August 18, 1933 – December 27, 2006) was an American film and television actress.

== Early life ==
With regard to Anna Navarro's birthplace, various references cite different locations. Some sources state that she was born in Nicaragua, while others note it was Winter Park, Florida. In an interview with Navarro published in the Los Angeles Times in October 1961, writer Lydia Lane identifies New York as her birthplace.

== Career ==
Navarro began her career in entertainment serving as a guide in numerous variety television programs. According to some sources, she made her film debut in 1953's Jack Slade. She appeared in the movies Jubilee Trail, The Human Jungle and The Adventures of Hajji Baba in 1954. Navarro's television debut was in the western television series The Adventures of Kit Carson. She then made appearances in the television programs Treasury Men in Action, I Led 3 Lives and The Cisco Kid.

Later in her career, Navarro guest-starred in numerous television programs including Gunsmoke, Bonanza, Tales of Wells Fargo, Perry Mason, Tombstone Territory, The Virginian, The Life and Legend of Wyatt Earp, Maverick, Family Affair (3 episodes), Death Valley Days, Outlaws, Alfred Hitchcock Presents, Barnaby Jones, The Californians, Peter Gunn and Bat Masterson. Her final credit was from the action crime television series Walker, Texas Ranger.

== Death ==
Navarro died on December 27, 2006, at the age of 73.

== Filmography ==
- Jack Slade (1953) as Mexican Girl (uncredited)
- Jubilee Trail (1954) as Conchita (uncredited)
- The Human Jungle (1954) as Waitress (uncredited)
- The Adventures of Hajji Baba (1954) as Slave Girl (uncredited)
- Son of Sinbad (1955) as Slave Girl (uncredited)
- Wichita (1955) as Girl (uncredited)
- Time Table (1956) as Mexican Bar Fly (uncredited)
- From Hell to Texas (1958) as Conchita (uncredited)
- The Badlanders (1958) as Raquel (uncredited)
- Topaz (1969) as Carlotta Mendoza
- The First Deadly Sin (1980) as Sunny Jordeen
- Angel III: The Final Chapter (1988) as Gloria
- Last Action Hero (1993) as Cop in Station

== Television ==
- Perry Mason (1957 TV series) (1958) (Season 1 Episode 20: "The Case of the Lonely Heiress") as Delores Coterro
- Wanted: Dead Or Alive (1958) (Season 1 Episode 4 "Dead End") as Conchita Morales
- Alfred Hitchcock Presents (1959) (Season 4 Episode 15: "A Personal Matter") as Nurse Maria
- Gunsmoke (TV series) (1963) (Season 9 Episode 11: "Extradition Part 1 & 2") as Marguerita
- The Virginian (TV series) (1969) (Season 8 Episode 03: "Halfway Back from Hell") as Maria Ortiz
- Walker, Texas Ranger (1999) (Season 7, Episode 22: "Jacob's Ladder") as Hannah Sanchez

In the TV show "CHiPs", Ponch's mother, Maria Poncherello, was played by actress Anna Navarro. She appeared in Season 2's "Rally 'Round the Bank" and Season 3's "Christmas Watch".
