= Matilda (1978 film) =

- Theatrical release poster
- Directed by: Daniel Mann
- Screenplay by: Albert S. Ruddy; Timothy Galfas
- Based on: Matilda by Paul Gallico
- Produced by: Albert S. Ruddy
- Starring: Elliott Gould; Clive Revill; Harry Guardino; Roy Clark; Lionel Stander; Art Metrano; Karen Carlson; Robert Mitchum
- Cinematography: Jack Woolf
- Edited by: Allan Jacobs
- Music by: Jerrold Immel
- Distributed by: American International Pictures
- Release date: June 22, 1978
- Running time: 105 minutes
- Country: United States
- Language: English
- Budget: $5 million

Matilda is a 1978 American comedy film directed by Daniel Mann and starring Elliott Gould, Robert Mitchum and Lionel Stander. The screenplay by Albert S. Ruddy and Timothy Galfas is based on the 1970 novel by Paul Gallico.

== Plot ==
A small-time talent agent discovers a boxing kangaroo and figures to use him as his stepping-stone into the big leagues by having him compete with a human pugilist.

== Cast ==
- Elliott Gould – Bernie Bonnelli
- Clive Revill – Billy Baker
- Harry Guardino – Uncle Nono
- Roy Clark – Wild Bill Wildman
- Karen Carlson – Kathleen Smith
- Art Metrano – Gordon Baum
- Lionel Stander – Pinky Schwab
- Roberta Collins – Tanya Six
- Larry Pennell – Lee Dockerty
- Gary Morgan – Matilda
- Robert Mitchum – Duke Parkhurst
- Lenny Montana – Hood #1
- Frank Avianca – Hood #2
- Joe De Fish – Hood #3
- Pat Henry – Hood #4

== Production ==
The film was budgeted at $5.2 million. Producer Al Ruddy explained that "we debated over using both a real kangaroo and an actor in costume and opted for the latter as cross-cutting proved too jarring for the viewer. However the costume was a $30,000 investment that paid off as it not only allowed freedom of movement, but we were able to program it with transistors to allow us to direct the actor's tiniest gesture." Critic Tom Allen wrote in The Village Voice that "Matilda is worked by a person in a fur suit and fixed mask. ... The technicians do not even get the ears to wiggle and the mouth to pucker until the final minutes."

Gould said "Al Ruddy wanted to buy back my position, my points in the picture, he offered me hundreds of thousands of dollars, which at that point I decided would be bad karma. That was bad judgment on my part.”

Half the budget was provided by Melvin Simon Productions. TV rights were sold to CBS for $2.5 million, foreign sales were $1.6 million and AIP paid an advance of $1.8 million. This added up to $5.9 million meaning Simon made a profit of $450,000.

== Soundtrack ==
- "When I'm with You, I'm Feelin' Good" - Music by Carol Connors, Lyrics by Ernie Shelton, Sung by Pat Boone & Debby Boone, Record Produced by Mike Curb
- "Waltzing Matilda" - (uncredited), Lyrics by A.B. 'Banjo' Paterson, Music by Christina Macpherson

== See also ==
- List of boxing films

== Notes ==
- List of American films of 1978
