= Blood Song =

1982 American slasher film directed by Alan J. Levi

- Australian theatrical release poster
- Directed by: Alan J. Levi
- Written by: Frank Avianca; James Fargo; Lenny Montana
- Story by: Joseph M. Shink; George Hart
- Produced by: Frank Avianca; Lenny Montana
- Starring: Frankie Avalon; Donna Wilkes; Richard Jaeckel; Antoinette Bower
- Cinematography: Stephen Posey
- Edited by: Ann Mills
- Music by: Monty Turner; Robert J. Walsh
- Production companies: Allstate Film Company; Mountain High Enterprises
- Distributed by: Summa Vista Pictures
- Release date: 1982
- Running time: 90 minutes
- Country: United States
- Language: English
- Budget: $1.2 million

Blood Song (also known as Dream Slayer) is a 1982 American slasher film directed Alan J. Levi, (Note: Robert Angus served as an uncredited co-director.) produced by Frank Avianca and Lenny Montana, and starring Frankie Avalon and Donna Wilkes. It follows a crippled young woman in a coastal Oregon town who is stalked by a hatchet-wielding psychopath from whom she once received a blood transfusion. The movie is notable for a different style of performance from Avalon.

Based on a short story by Joseph Shink, Blood Song was adapted by Shink along with producers Avianca and Montana. The film was shot in the fall of 1980 in Coos Bay and Coquille, Oregon. While not prosecuted for obscenity, the film was seized and confiscated in the United Kingdom under Section 3 of the Obscene Publications Act 1959 during the "video nasty" panic.

== Plot ==
In 1955 in Portland, Oregon, a businessman finds his wife in bed with another man, and commits a double murder-suicide. His young son, Paul, witnesses the three deaths, and is traumatized. Twenty-five years later, in 1980, Paul is incarcerated at a psychiatric institution near Stanford Bay, a small town on the Oregon Coast. One day, Paul manages to murder an orderly, and subsequently retrieves a beloved wooden flute given to him by his father before escaping the institution.

Meanwhile, Stanford Bay teenager Marion is struggling to adjust to her disability: She survived a car accident several years prior—caused by her drunken father, Frank—which left her unable to walk without the help of a leg brace. Marion's home life is troubled, with her father being verbally abusive to her and her mother, Bea. She dreams of leaving Stanford Bay once her fisherman boyfriend, Joey, obtains a job in Portland.

Paul manages to hitch a ride with a truck driver. When the driver becomes annoyed by Paul's flute-playing, Paul bludgeons him in the head with a hatchet, killing him, before stealing his vehicle. He subsequently picks up a female hitchhiker, who he brings to a local motel in Stanford Bay. The two begin to engage in sex, but Paul strangles her to death after he fails to charm her with his flute-playing, and proceeds to dismember her body. Marion is concurrently plagued by bizarre dreams and visions of the murders, which she comes to discover are in fact premonitions. While in the hospital after her accident, she had received a blood transfusion from Paul, which has given her extrasensory perception of Paul's actions in the present.

Marion's psychic visions of Paul's actions increase in frequency and intensity, and she eventually runs into him in person disposing of the female hitchhiker's dismembered corpse on a rural beach, making her his next target. Marion manages to elude Paul, but he later discovers where she lives. He infiltrates her home, killing her father. Struggling to walk, Marion manages to flee her home to an adjacent sawmill, and is pursued by Paul. While chasing Marion, Paul impales a worker with a forklift, and then inadvertently crashes through a barrier, driving the forklift off the pier and into the bay.

Later at the police station, Marion is questioned about her attacker, who she identifies as the "man she dreamed about." Unable to find any trace of Paul, and finding only the body of the worker in the bay, the police assume that Marion is mentally ill and responsible for the murders herself. Marion has another vision of Paul hitching a ride with Joey, and knowing he's going to be killed next, she flips out as she is put in an ambulance. She is committed to the same psychiatric institution from which Paul had earlier escaped. While lying bound to a hospital bed, Paul enters her room posing as a doctor. She awakens, and screams in horror.

== Cast ==
- Frankie Avalon as Paul Foley
- Donna Wilkes as Marion
- Richard Jaeckel as Frank Hauser
- Antoinette Bower as Bea
- Dane Clark as Sheriff Gibbons
- Lenny Montana as Skipper
- William Kirby Cullen as Joey
- Noelle North as Kathy
- Jennifer Enskat as Judith
- Christopher Scarano as Deputy Wilkins
- Victor Izay as Doctor
- David Arndt as First Boy
- Norman Brecke as Norm
- Roydon Clark as Watchman
- Candace Dickey as Betty

== Production ==
=== Development ===
Blood Song was based on a short story by Joseph Shink, who adapted the screenplay with Frank Avianca and Lenny Montana. Montana cast Frankie Avalon as the killer based on his performance in an episode of Fantasy Island. Per a 1980 report, Carol Lynley was at one time cast in the film.

=== Filming ===
Principal photography began in late October 1980 on the Central Oregon Coast, including locations in Coos Bay, Charleston, Coquille, and North Bend. The film crew comprised approximately 75 people.

Jim Kimbell, an executive producer for Mountain High Enterprises, the film's production company, suggested Coos Bay as the filming location, as he had formerly lived there and felt it would be an ideal setting for the film. Filming sites in Coos Bay included the Coos Head Timber Company, the Pony Village Mall, Gino's Pizzeria, and the Charleston Small Boat Basin. The shoot was scheduled for a total of 22 days, under the film's working titles Premonitions, on a budget of $1.2 million. Though uncredited, Robert Angus served as an additional director on the film.

=== Music ===
The film features an original song, "It's All In Your Mind", performed by Lainie Kazan.

== Release ==
=== Home media ===
Blood Song was released on VHS in the United States in the spring of 1983. Though not prosecuted for obscenity, it was seized and confiscated in the United Kingdom under Section 3 of the Obscene Publications Act 1959 during the "video nasty" panic, due to its violent content.

In the 1990s, it was subsequently released by Coast-to-Coast Video under the title Dream Slayer with ”Slayer” on the cover stylised similarly to the logo of the Californian thrash metal band Slayer

The film was released on DVD by BCI Entertainment as part of their Exploitation Cinema double feature line alongside the film Mausoleum.

=== Critical response ===
AllMovie's review of the film was mixed, writing, "Blood Song is dumb fun for those in the market for such and there is perverse enjoyment in watching Avalon's inexplicable performance, but don't expect chills or logic." Film scholar Scott Aaron Stine wrote: "As derivative as the script may be, Blood Song is surprisingly palatable," citing the script's "sympathetic" characters as key. TV Guide's Fred Beldin wrote that the film "certainly earns points for pop culture dissonance if nothing more... the sweet crippled girl is inadequately developed, and the shock ending is a cop-out cribbed from every other hack slasher film that was selling tickets at the time. Blood Song is dumb fun for those in the market for such and there is perverse enjoyment in watching Avalon's inexplicable performance, but don't expect chills or logic."

== Sources ==
- Stine, Scott Aaron (2003). The Gorehound's Guide to Splatter Films of the 1980s. Jefferson, North Carolina: McFarland. ISBN 978-1-476-61132-7.
- Thrower, Stephen (2007). Nightmare USA: The Untold Story of the Exploitation Independents. London: FAB Press. p. 424. ISBN 978-1-903-25469-1.
- Willis, Donald C. (1984). Horror and Science Fiction Films. Vol. III. Lanham, Maryland: Scarecrow Press. ISBN 978-0-810-81723-4.
