= Schizoid (film) =

1980 film by David Paulsen

- Directed by: David Paulsen
- Written by: David Paulsen
- Produced by: Menahem Golan; Yoram Globus
- Starring: Klaus Kinski; Marianna Hill; Craig Wasson; Christopher Lloyd; Flo Gerrish; Donna Wilkes; Joe Regalbuto; Richard Herd
- Cinematography: Norman Leigh
- Edited by: Robert Fitzgerald; Dick Brummer
- Music by: Craig Hundley
- Production company: Golan-Globus Productions
- Distributed by: The Cannon Group, Inc.
- Release date: September 5, 1980
- Running time: 89 minutes
- Country: United States
- Language: English
- Budget: $350,000

Schizoid is a 1980 American slasher film directed and written by David Paulsen, and starring Klaus Kinski, Marianna Hill, Craig Wasson, Christopher Lloyd, and Donna Wilkes. It follows a Los Angeles advice columnist who is subject to a series of threatening anonymous letters, while members of a group therapy she attends are being stalked and murdered by a killer armed with shearing scissors.

Produced and distributed by The Cannon Group, Inc., Schizoid was filmed in Los Angeles in 1980 and released theatrically in September that year. The film received largely negative reviews from critics, with several, such as Roger Ebert and Kevin Thomas, criticizing its depictions of violence against women.

== Plot ==
Recently-divorced Los Angeles advice columnist Julie Caffret begins attending group therapy sessions led by the widowed Dr. Pieter Fales, a German psychologist. The sessions are held in Pieter's spacious house, which he shares with his teenage daughter, Alison. Members of the group include Gilbert, a lonely handyman who works in Julie's apartment building; Pat, a Wellesley College graduate employed as a stripper, and with whom Pieter carries on a secret sexual relationship; and Rosemary Boyle, a spinster.

After one of the sessions, one of the female members of the therapy group is stalked by an unseen motorist while riding a bicycle on a country dirt road, and is chased into an abandoned house, where she is brutally stabbed to death with a pair of scissors. A short time later, a teenage couple having sex in the garage of the abandoned house find the woman's dead body. Meanwhile, Julie is disturbed after she begins receiving a number of anonymous cut-and-paste notes threatening murder and assault. Finding little help from authorities, Julie ponders responding to the anonymous letter writer in her advice column. Doug, her ex-husband with whom she works with at the newspaper, warns her against this, fearing it will only lead to further harassment.

Late one night after leaving the strip club, Pat is stalked by the unseen motorist, who chases her through an alleyway. She attempts to flee, but is cornered by the assailant, who stabs her to death. Julie grows close to Pieter, and is invited by him to his house for a formal dinner. However, the meal goes awry when Alison, dressed in her deceased mother's clothing, rages at her father for inviting Julie there on the anniversary of her mother's death.

Later, Doug witnesses Julie and Pieter engaging in sex when he peers through the window of her apartment. The next day, Rosemary, while relaxing in her hot tub, is stalked by the killer, who slashes her to death with scissors. In his office, Pieter discovers a paper clipping lying on the floor, and begins to suspect Alison may be the one sending Julie the threatening letters. He confronts her, and asks if she is responsible for the deaths of his patients. Alison vehemently denies any involvement and, despondent, locks herself in the garage and turns on her car, attempting suicide by carbon monoxide poisoning. However, she decides against it, and backs the car through the garage door before speeding away.

Julie publishes her office phone number in her advice column, hoping for a call from the killer that police can trace. Doug, though initially reluctant to the idea, agrees to help Julie and listen in on any phone calls. Julie receives a call from Alison, who asks if she can come speak with her. Alison arrives and confronts Julie and Doug, threatening them with a pistol. Moments later, Pieter calls the office, and rushes there when Julie says Alison's name. Pieter arrives and finds the office in disarray, but nobody in sight. Doug, brandishing Alison's pistol, begins to shoot at Pieter as he stalks him through the office—it is revealed that Doug is in fact the killer, motivated by Julie's sharing of details regarding the deterioration of their marriage, and what he perceives as a slight against his character.

Police and investigators descend on the office building as Doug threatens Pieter with a pistol, while Julie and Alison, who were kidnapped by Doug and bound-and-gagged in a supply room, manage to free themselves by cutting through their bonds with a pair of scissors. Pieter and Doug engage in a violent fight, which Julie and Alison stumble upon. As Doug gains control of Pieter, Alison stabs him to death with a pair of scissors, saving her father's life. Seconds later, police burst into the office, as Pieter, Julie, and Alison embrace.

== Cast ==
- Klaus Kinski as Pieter Fales
- Marianna Hill as Julie Caffret
- Craig Wasson as Doug Caffret
- Donna Wilkes as Alison Fales
- Christopher Lloyd as Gilbert
- Richard Herd as Lieutenant Donahue
- Joe Regalbuto as Detective Jake
- Flo Lawrence as Pat
- Kiva Lawrence as Rosemary Boyle
- Claude Duvernoy as Françoise

== Production ==
In a February 20, 1980 issue of The Hollywood Reporter, the film was announced as starting principal photography on 13 March 1980 under the title Molded to Murder. It was announced in March that the film's title had been changed to Murder by Mail. The film was announced for sale at the Cannes International Film Festival Market, but was not screened for potential buyers.

Flo Lawrence said she felt somehow abused by Klaus Kinski in the scene just after the topless dancing one: "Kinski starts grabbing me and touching me in places that he had no business touching me. My acting chops went out the window, I should have slapped him, but I was just so shocked and no one yelled 'Cut' at that point." Actor Richard Herd recalled of the production that he and Kinski "got along well... He was such a classy actor. He was a little odd. He did not like people to touch him."

== Release ==
Schizoid was first shown in Detroit and Cleveland on September 5, 1980. It later opened in Los Angeles on October 10, 1980. The Hollywood Reporter announced that in its first month on release the film grossed over $4 million in the United States. The film screened in the United Kingdom in June 1981 as a double feature alongside The Godsend (1980).

=== Critical response ===
Critics Gene Siskel and Roger Ebert discussed the film on an October 23, 1980 episode of Sneak Previews, and they found the film "gruesome and despicable" and "expressing hatred for woman." Kevin Thomas of the Los Angeles Times expressed a similar sentiment, describing it as a "trashy violence-against women jolter." George Bouwman of the Fort Myers, Florida News-Press deemed the film "sleazy and degrading" and its suspense "almost non-existent." Robert C. Trussell of The Kansas City Star deemed the film "low-budget psychological garbage," but conceded that "the interesting thing about this generally below-average film is that it holds your interest." Ed Blank of The Pittsburgh Press felt the film was a "slipshod" effort, writing: "It's confounding how pictures like this continue to be marketed and bought."

Tom McElfresh of The Cincinnati Enquirer had mixed feelings on the film, describing it as "a cheap, bloody little horror number with a driveling plot, dismal dialogue and a far too serious attitude about itself," but conceded that writer-director Paulsen "has a certain taste for the neo-baroque in certain surreal sequences, even though his storytelling, both his words and his images, lack cohesion and control."

=== Home media ===
Scream Factory released the film as a double-feature DVD and Blu-ray combination set with X-Ray (1982), another Cannon Films release, in 2013. This edition went out-of-print on October 12, 2020. In March 2022, Vinegar Syndrome reissued the double-feature disc in 4K UHD format with newly-commissioned bonus features.

== Sources ==
- Edwards, Matthew, ed. (2016). Klaus Kinski, Beast of Cinema: Critical Essays and Fellow Filmmaker Interviews. Jefferson, North Carolina: McFarland. ISBN 978-1-476-62508-9.
- Edwards, Matthew (2017). Twisted Visions: Interviews with Cult Horror Filmmakers. Jefferson, North Carolina: McFarland. ISBN 978-1-476-66376-0.
- Paul, Louis (2014). Tales from the Cult Film Trenches: Interviews with 36 Actors from Horror, Science Fiction and Exploitation Cinema. Jefferson, North Carolina: McFarland. ISBN 978-0-786-48402-7.
