= Donna Wilkes =

American actress (born 1958)

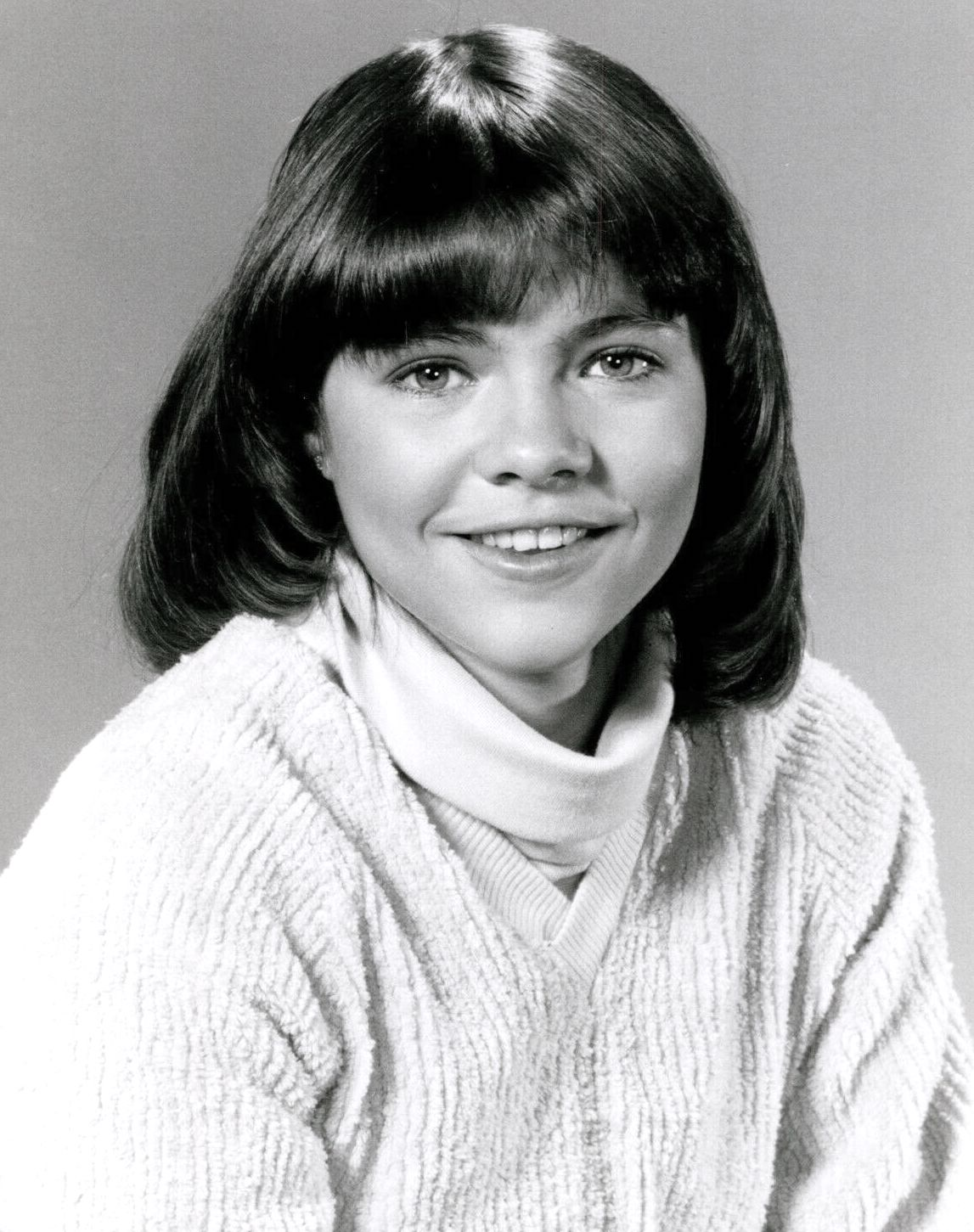
- Wilkes in 1979
- Born: c. 1958–1961 (age 64–68); New York City, U.S.
- Occupation: Actress
- Years active: 1978–present
- Known for: Angel; Jaws 2; Days of Our Lives; Hello, Larry; Blood Song
- Spouse: Billy Gray (m. 1977; div. 1981)
- Children: 1

Donna Consuelo Wilkes (born c. 1958–1961) (Note: Sources vary regarding Wilkes's birthdate. AllMovie lists her birthdate as January 1, 1961 while Rotten Tomatoes and the Mr. Skin's Skincyclopedia state she was born November 11, 1959 in California; this contradicts a 1984 People article, which states that Wilkes was born in Manhattan. The People article also claims she was 20 years old at the time, implying her birth year as 1963–1964.) is an American actress. She began her career as a child actor in commercials before making her feature film debut in Jaws 2 (1978). She subsequently had a supporting role in Almost Summer (1978), followed by lead roles in the horror films Schizoid (1980) and Blood Song (1982). She also appeared in several television programs, including the soap opera Days of Our Lives (1982–1983), portraying Pamela Prentiss. She portrayed Diane Alder in the short-lived sitcom Hello, Larry (1979), a role she reprised in a crossover episode with Diff'rent Strokes.

Wilkes is perhaps best known for her starring role in the thriller Angel (1984), in which she portrayed a preparatory student in Los Angeles who lives a double life as a prostitute by night. Her other credits include the horror film Grotesque (1988), opposite Linda Blair and Tab Hunter, and guest-starring roles on the series Dragnet (1989) and FBI: The Untold Stories (1991).

Wilkes abandoned her acting career in the early 1990s after the birth of her daughter. She returned to acting in 2013, appearing in the independent films My Stepbrother Is a Vampire!?! and 90210 Shark Attack (2014).

== Biography ==
=== Early life ===
Wilkes was born in Manhattan, New York City in Spanish Harlem. Her father was Wayman Otis Wilkes (1918 – 2013), an Irish American chiropractor originally from Texas, while her mother, a nightclub singer from Dominican Republic, was of Spanish and French descent. Wilkes's parents divorced when she was 3 months old. She was raised speaking both English and Spanish, and is fluent in both.

When she was six she made her first commercial, for Keds sneakers. She trained in acting at Dominica American Theatre of Performing Arts, but stopped her training at age 11 to become a "normal student." At age 12, she went to live with her aunt and uncle in the Dominican Republic. Wilkes attended the Collegio Santo Domingo where she was an advanced student, graduating at age 14. At age 15, she moved to Los Angeles, California, but, unable to work at such a young age, convinced many employers that she was 18 and married. Her first jobs included being a computer operator for an ambulance service, and as a secretary and administrative assistant for a large corporation.

=== Career beginnings ===
Wilkes began acting again at age 17. Her first role was the part of Jackie Peters in the 1978 Universal Pictures film Jaws 2. That same year, she starred as Meredith in Almost Summer, which earned her a Screen Actors Guild (SAG) card. At around age 18, she married 39-year-old actor Billy Gray, known for his work on Father Knows Best. The marriage soon ended in divorce.

Wilkes was cast in the NBC sitcom Hello, Larry as one of McLean Stevenson's onscreen daughters. Wilkes was a regular for the first season of Hello, Larry in 1979 but her role was recast with Krista Errickson for the series' second and final season (1979-1980).

In 1980, Wilkes portrayed the mentally-unstable daughter of a psychologist (played by Klaus Kinski) in the horror film Schizoid. She subsequently starred in the Oregon-shot slasher film Blood Song (1982) opposite Frankie Avalon, playing a disabled young woman stalked by a maniacal killer with whom she has a telepathic connection.

=== Angel, hiatus, and later career ===
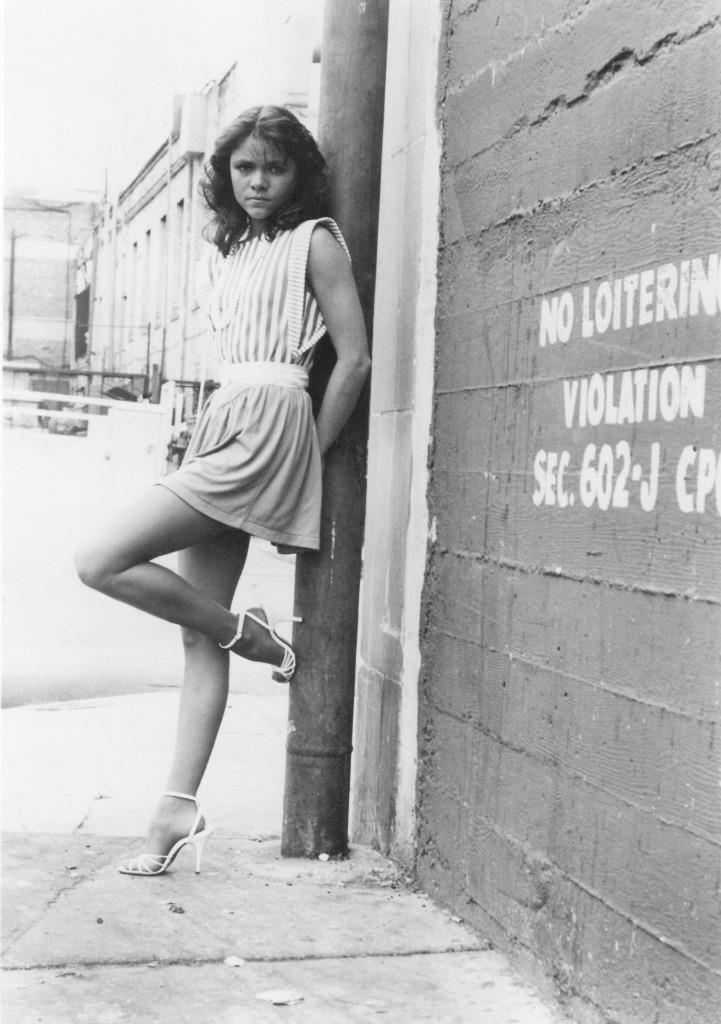
Press photo of Donna Wilkes as Molly "Angel" Stewart promoting Angel

Wilkes had a central role as Pamela Prentiss on the soap opera Days of Our Lives from 1983 to 1984.

She subsequently gained international attention for her leading role in the cult sexploitation film Angel, in which she played Molly "Angel" Stewart, a high school honor student by day, and a prostitute by night, opposite Cliff Gorman, Susan Tyrrell, Dick Shawn, and Rory Calhoun. The film spawned three sequels in which Wilkes had no involvement. Wilkes was 22 or so at the time she played the 15-year-old character. To prepare for the role, she spent time in halfway houses and rehabilitation centers in Los Angeles. Released by New World Pictures in January 1984, Angel was a box-office hit, grossing $17.5 million in the United States.

Following Angel, Wilkes continued to work in television, making guest appearances on the series Partners in Crime (1984), Hell Town (1985), and Dragnet (1989). She also had a supporting role in the horror film Grotesque (1988), co-starring with Linda Blair and Tab Hunter.

Wilkes abandoned her acting career in the early 1990s after giving birth to her daughter. She returned to acting in the 2010s, appearing in the independent films My Stepbrother Is a Vampire!?! (2013), 90210 Shark Attack (2014) and Buzz Cut (2021).

== Filmography ==
=== Film ===
Year	Title	Role	Notes
1978	Jaws 2	Jackie Peters	
1978	Almost Summer	Meredith	
1979	Fyre	Carol	
1979	Hard Knocks	Chris	Alternate titles: Mid-Knight Rider and Hollywood Knight
1980	Schizoid	Alison Fales	Alternate title: Murder by Mail
1982	Blood Song	Marion	Alternate title: Dream Slayer
1984	Angel	Molly 'Angel' Stewart	
1988	Grotesque	Kathy	
2013	My Stepbrother Is a Vampire!?!	Miss Fortune	
2014	90210 Shark Attack	Pamela	
2021	Buzz Cut	Bee Shop Lady	

=== Television ===
Year	Title	Role	Notes
1978	The Courage and the Passion	Tracy	Television film
1978	The Incredible Hulk	Alice Morrow	Episode: "Alice in Disco Land"
1979	Hello, Larry	Diane Alder	Main cast (14 episodes)
1979	Diff'rent Strokes	Diane Alder	Episode: "The Trip: Part 1"
1979	The Runaways		Episode: "Land of Honey"
1981	Born to Be Sold	Cindy Carlson	Television film
1981	House Calls		Episode: "The Sex Police"
1982	Father Murphy	Emma Walker	Episodes: "The First Miracle" (Parts 1 & 2)
1982	T. J. Hooker	Karen Stewart	Episode: "King of the Hill"
1982–1983	Days of Our Lives	Pamela Prentiss	Main cast (14 episodes)
1983	Teachers Only		Episode: "Praise the Lord and Pasta Ammunition"
1984	Gimme a Break!	Gina	Episode: "The Center"
1984	Partners in Crime	Sandy	Episode: "Fantasyland"
1985	Hell Town	Meg	Episode: "The Rat Man Cometh"
1986	Superior Court		Episode: "Date Rape"
1989	Dragnet	Amy Redmond	Episode: "Safe in Jail"
1991	FBI: The Untold Stories	Teresa Starr	Episode: "The Murder of Judge John Wood"

== Sources ==
- Lamparski, Richard (1982). Whatever Became Of-- ?: Eighth Series : the Best (updated) and Newest of the Famous Lamparski Profiles of Personalities of Yesteryear. New York City, New York: Crown Publishers. ISBN 978-0-517-54346-7.
- McBride, Jim (2004). Mr. Skin's Skincyclopedia: The A-to-Z Guide to Finding Your Favorite Actresses Naked. New York: Macmillan. p. 593. ISBN 978-0-312-33144-3.
- Shary, Timothy (2009). Generation Multiplex: The Image of Youth in Contemporary American Cinema. Austin, Texas: University of Texas Press. ISBN 978-0-292-77490-2.
- Stine, Scott Aaron (2003). The Gorehound's Guide to Splatter Films of the 1980s. Jefferson, North Carolina: McFarland. ISBN 978-1-4766-1132-7.
