= Angel III: The Final Chapter =

1988 film by Tom DeSimone

- VHS cover
- Directed by: Tom DeSimone
- Written by: Tom DeSimone
- Produced by: Arnold H. Orgolini
- Starring: Mitzi Kapture; Mark Blankfield; Emile Beaucard; Maud Adams; Richard Roundtree
- Cinematography: Howard Wexler
- Edited by: Warren Chadwick
- Music by: Eric Allaman; BerlinGame
- Production company: New World Pictures
- Distributed by: New World Pictures
- Release date: November 10, 1988
- Running time: 94 minutes
- Country: United States
- Language: English

Angel III: The Final Chapter is a 1988 American action thriller film written and directed by Tom DeSimone. A sequel to Avenging Angel (1985) and it is the third installment in the Angel film series, and stars Mitzi Kapture in the role of Molly, a former prostitute.

== Premise ==
Molly, now a freelance photographer (having apparently abandoned law school) living in New York City, is at an art show and accidentally takes a picture of a woman who turns out to be her mother, who abandoned her over 14 years ago. Molly learns she has a sister and both are connected to a dangerous crime element. Molly goes to Los Angeles to find out if the woman is her mother. The reunion is short-lived when her mother calls her to tell her that her sister is in danger and later, her mother is killed in an explosion. Molly must once again become Angel to try and find her sister.

== Cast ==
- Mitzi Kapture as Molly "Angel" Stewart
- Maud Adams as Nadine
- Richard Roundtree as Lieutenant Doniger
- Mark Blankfield as "Spanky"
- Emile Beaucard as Shahid
- Kin Shriner as Neal
- Tawny Fere as Michelle
- S.A. Griffin as Roger
- Floyd Levine as Lieutenant Mellin
- Dick Miller as Nick Pellegrini
- Toni Basil as Hillary
- Anna Navarro as Gloria
- Julie K. Smith as Darlene (credited as Julie Kristen Smith)
- Paunita Nichols as Black Hooker
- Roxanne Kernohan as White Hooker
- Laura Albert as Nude Dancer
- Ashlyn Gere as Video Girl #2 (credited as Kim McKamy)
- Barbara Hammond as Video Girl #2
- Cheryl Starbuck as Video Girl #3

== Reception ==
Michael Musto of The Village Voice stated that the film completes "a sort of Godfather trilogy of teen prostitution" and that he loves the film despite its poor quality.

== Sequel ==
A fourth film in the series, Angel 4: Undercover, was released in 1993.
