= Jack Slade (film) =

1953 film by Harold D. Schuster

- Directed by: Harold Schuster
- Written by: Warren Douglas
- Produced by: John H. Burrows; Lindsley Parsons
- Starring: Mark Stevens; Dorothy Malone; Barton MacLane
- Cinematography: William A. Sickner
- Edited by: Leonard W. Herman
- Music by: Paul Dunlap
- Production companies: Allied Artists Pictures; Monogram Pictures
- Distributed by: Allied Artists Pictures; Associated British-Pathé; Interna Filmverleih; Comet Video
- Release date: November 8, 1953
- Running time: 90 minutes
- Country: United States
- Language: English

Jack Slade is a 1953 American black-and-white Western film directed by Harold Schuster, written by Warren Douglas and starring Mark Stevens. It was followed by a sequel, The Return of Jack Slade (1955), also directed by Schuster, written by Douglas and starring John Ericson. Both were based on chapter 9 through 11 of Mark Twain's book Roughing It.

== Cast ==
- Mark Stevens as Jack Slade
- Dorothy Malone as Virginia Maria Dale
- Barton MacLane as Jules Reni
- John Litel as Judge Davidson
- Paul Langton as Dan Traver
- Harry Shannon as Tom Carter
- John Harmon as Hollis
- Jim Bannon as Farnsworth
- Lee Van Cleef as Bolt Mackay
- David May as Tump
- Ron Hargrave as Ned Prentice
- Sammy Ogg as Joey Slade
- Nelson Leigh as Alf Slade
- Richard Reeves as Rufe Prentice
- Dorothy Kennedy as Mrs. Ward
- Duane Thorsen as Tad Prentice
- Robert Carson as Holdup Man
- Harry Cheshire as Mr. Hill
- Bill Coontz as Barfly
- Steve Darrell as Holdup Man
- Tex Driscoll as Barfly
- Donald Elson as Mr. Ward
- Nancy Gilbert as Little Girl
- John Halloran as Johnny Danton
- Chick Hannan as Barfly
- Jim Hayward as Bartender
- Ray Jones as Townsman
- Harry Landers as Danton Son
- Scotty Morrow as The Ward Boy
- Anna Navarro as Mexican Girl
- Fox O'Callahan as Barfly
- Tex Palmer as Townsman
- Hank Patterson as Old Tom
- Steve Pendleton as Stage Passenger
- Jack Tornek as Barfly
- Bob Woodward as Stage Driver

== Reception ==
The film was popular at the box office.
