= Frankie Sardo =

American film producer

- Born: Francesco Sardo Avianca; September 16, 1936; Sicily, Kingdom of Italy
- Died: February 26, 2014 (aged 77) Somers, New York, US
- Genres: Rock and roll, doo-wop
- Occupations: Singer, actor, producer
- Years active: 1958–1988
- Labels: ABC Paramount, MGM

Frank Sardo Avianca (September 16, 1936 – February 26, 2014), who performed as Frankie Sardo, was an American rock and roll singer, actor and film producer.

== Life ==
He was born on September 16, 1936 into an Italian-American family from Sicily. His father, Marco Sardo Sr. was a bricklayer and his mother Anita (Avianca) Sardo, was a housewife. As a young child, Frankie and his sisters (Marie and Antonette) lived in the 1300 block of East 95th Street in Brooklyn, New York. By age five, Frankie Sardo had his first musical debut on stage of the theatre of Little Italy, in the Bronx. He continued to perform in these theatres, which catered to Italian immigrants, along with his parents, Marco and Anita, who had a comedy act. After high school graduation, Frankie attended Fork Union Military Academy (FUMA), in Fluvanna County, Virginia where he also acted in stage plays. He served in the military in Korea. On his return to the United States, Frankie joined a comedy group, before making his first recordings as a singer for MGM Records in 1958.

His second record, "Fake Out", written by his brother Johnny Sardo (born 1941) and released by ABC-Paramount, became a regional hit, and he was invited to join the 1959 Winter Dance Party tour starring Buddy Holly, Ritchie Valens, The Big Bopper (J.P. Richardson), and Dion and the Belmonts with Sardo as the opening act (most of the tour's posters mistitled his song "Fake Out" as "Take Out"). After the tour concert at Clear Lake, Iowa on February 2, 1959, Sardo traveled to the next venue by bus with Dion and the Belmonts and other performers on the tour, while Holly, Valens, and Richardson took a plane. The plane crashed in the early hours of February 3, killing the three stars and pilot Roger Peterson. Sardo continued to release singles on several different record labels until 1962; on some, he performed with his brother as a duo, Frankie and Johnny. On September 7, 1960, Frankie Sardo appeared on American Bandstand, where he performed his single, "When the Bells Stop Ringing".

Using the name Frank Avianca, he worked as a film actor and producer. His film credits included co-writing the lyrics of several songs for the movie Hell's Angels '69 (1969). He produced Clay Pigeon (1971), co-produced The 14, also known as Existence (1973); produced and acted in The Human Factor (1975); and appeared in Matilda (1978). He then co-wrote and co-produced the horror film Blood Song (1982), and also co-wrote and co-produced the feature-length animated film Ferretina - The Promise.

He lived in many places including England, Canada and California. In 1982, after wrapping up his horror film Blood Song, Sardo returned to California and married his young love, Hedda Britt, in a civil ceremony at their home in Chatsworth.

In 2010, Frank was interviewed by the Rock and Roll Hall of Fame about his experiences on the 1959 tour.

Frankie Sardo died of cancer in Somers, New York on February 26, 2014, aged 77.

== Filmography ==
Year	Title	Role	Notes
1975	The 'Human' Factor	Kamal	
1978	Matilda	Hood #2	final film role
1988	The Undertaker	Uncle Chickie	director
