= Brink's: The Great Robbery =

- Genre: Drama
- Written by: Robert W. Lenski
- Directed by: Marvin J. Chomsky
- Starring: Stephen Collins; Carl Betz; Michael V. Gazzo; Leslie Nielsen; Darren McGavin; Cliff Gorman
- Music by: Richard Markowitz
- Country of origin: United States
- Original language: English

Production
- Executive producer: Quinn Martin
- Producer: Philip Saltzman
- Cinematography: Jacques R. Marquette
- Editor: Jerry Young
- Camera setup: Panavision Cameras and Lenses
- Running time: 100 minutes
- Production companies: Warner Bros. Television; Quinn Martin Productions

Original release
- Network: CBS
- Release: March 26, 1976

Brink's: The Great Robbery is a 1976 American crime drama television film. It stars Leslie Nielsen and is based on the Great Brink's Robbery in Boston in 1950.
