= Jack Tornek =

Belarusian-born American film and television actor

- Tornek in The Wild Wild West, 1966
- Born: Issy Targownik; January 2, 1888; Minsk, Russian Empire (now Belarus)
- Died: February 18, 1974 (aged 86); Los Angeles County, California, U.S.
- Occupations: Film and television actor
- Spouse: Anna Tornek

Issy Targownik (January 2, 1888 – February 18, 1974) was a Belarusian-born American film and television actor.

== Life and career ==
Tornek was born in Minsk, Russian Empire. He emigrated to the United States in 1903, and served in the United States Army. He began his screen career in 1916, appearing in the film 20,000 Leagues Under the Sea. In 1920, he appeared in the film The Mark of Zorro.

Later in his career, Tornek guest-starred in numerous television programs including Gunsmoke, Bonanza, Wagon Train, The Life and Legend of Wyatt Earp, Death Valley Days, Perry Mason, Tombstone Territory, Tales of Wells Fargo, Wanted Dead or Alive, Mr. Lucky, Have Gun – Will Travel, The Wild Wild West and Sugarfoot. He also appeared in numerous films such as West of the Pecos, Deep in the Heart of Texas, The Oklahoma Kid, The Man from Guntown, Texas Manhunt, Hang 'Em High, The Rawhide Years, Jack Slade, Requiem for a Gunfighter, The Lusty Men, Snake River Desperadoes and Bright Leaf.

Tornek retired from acting in 1969, last appearing in the film Support Your Local Sheriff!.

== Death ==
Tornek died on February 18, 1974, in Los Angeles County, California, at the age of 86.
