= An Unmarried Woman =

1978 film by Paul Mazursky

- Theatrical release poster
- Directed by: Paul Mazursky
- Written by: Paul Mazursky
- Produced by: Paul Mazursky; Tony Ray
- Starring: Jill Clayburgh; Alan Bates; Michael Murphy; Cliff Gorman
- Cinematography: Arthur J. Ornitz
- Edited by: Stuart H. Pappé
- Music by: Bill Conti
- Distributed by: 20th Century Fox
- Release date: March 5, 1978 (United States)
- Running time: 125 minutes
- Country: United States
- Language: English
- Budget: $2.5 million
- Box office: $62.5 million

An Unmarried Woman is a 1978 American romantic comedy-drama film written and directed by Paul Mazursky and starring Jill Clayburgh, Alan Bates, Michael Murphy, and Cliff Gorman. The film was nominated for three Academy Awards: Best Picture, Best Original Screenplay, and Best Actress (Clayburgh).

The film was released in the United States on March 5, 1978 and it was a box office success with $24 million domestically and $38.5 million internationally, earning $62.5 million in worldwide.

== Plot ==
Erica Benton works part-time at a SoHo art gallery and is in a seemingly happy marriage to Martin, a successful businessman. They live together with their teenage daughter Patti in an upscale apartment on Manhattan's Upper East Side. Martin, however, has been having a year-long affair with a much younger woman named Marcia. When he confesses to Erica that he loves his mistress and wants to marry her, Erica is devastated, and Martin moves out.

With the help of Patti, her circle of close friends, and a therapist, Erica slowly comes to terms with the divorce and begins to get her life back on track. She reluctantly tries dating again, but after Martin's betrayal and a disastrous blind date, she is even warier of ever finding a suitable man again. Her mistrust of men threatens her relationship with Patti, as she takes out her frustrations on Patti's boyfriend, Phil. Out of desperation, Erica has sex with Charlie, an obnoxious, chauvinistic co-worker, but she does not find the experience fulfilling.

As she grows more accustomed to her new life, she meets Saul, an abstract painter, and begins a relationship with him. Both value their independence and so have a difficult time adjusting to domestic life. When Patti meets Saul, she is initially hostile, believing Erica is trying to bring him in to replace Martin, which, Saul assures Patti, is not his intention.

After a few tense meetings, Martin and Erica begin to act cordially towards each other, only for Martin to reveal that Marcia has left him and he wants Erica back. Erica rebuffs him.

Saul tries to convince Erica to come with him to his home in Vermont for the summer, where he spends five months every year with his children, but she declines, not wishing to leave her daughter and her life behind for so long. Outside Saul's building, Erica helps him lower one of his paintings from his loft to the sidewalk. Shortly before driving away in his car, Saul reveals that the painting is a gift for Erica, leaving her to carry the giant canvas through the busy streets of Manhattan.

== Cast ==
- Jill Clayburgh as Erica Benton
- Alan Bates as Saul Kaplan
- Michael Murphy as Martin Benton
- Cliff Gorman as Charlie
- Pat Quinn as Sue Miller
- Kelly Bishop as Elaine Liebowitz
- Lisa Lucas as Patti Benton
- Linda Miller as Jeannette Lewin
- Andrew Duncan as Bob
- Daniel Seltzer as Dr. Jacobs
- Matthew Arkin as Phil
- Penelope Russianoff as Tanya Berkel
- Novella Nelson as Jean Starret
- Raymond J. Barry as Edward Thoreaux
- Ivan Karp as Herb Rowan
- Jill Eikenberry as Claire
- Michael Tucker as Fred
- Paul Mazursky as Hal
- Vincent Schiavelli as man at party
- David Rasche as man at bar (uncredited)

The abstract expressionist paintings in the film were created by artist Paul Jenkins, who taught Bates his painting technique for his acting role.

== Production ==
Paul Mazursky began writing the script in 1976 after interviewing several different women about their thoughts on marriage and independence. He initially offered the role of Erica to Jane Fonda, who passed to star in Julia. Mazursky also considered Barbra Streisand for the lead but did not hear back from her agent. Finally, Jill Clayburgh was considered without an audition after Mazursky saw her in a New York play. At 32 years old, Clayburgh was thought to be too young to play a wife in a 16-year marriage with a teenage daughter, but Clayburgh returned to Mazursky's office having styled herself in fashions indicative of an older woman and secured the part.

Principal photography began on April 5, 1977, in New York City, with the main locations being Manhattan's Upper East Side and SoHo neighborhoods. Clayburgh worked the entire shoot without a day off; her character was written into every scene of a film that was on a tight budget.

Anthony Hopkins was offered the role of Saul but turned it down because the character does not show up until past the midway point of the script. British actor Alan Bates, whom Mazursky had always admired and who had never appeared in an American film, was given the part. Bates had some misgivings because he did not want to leave his dying father in England, but Mazursky assured him that he would be given seven days to be with his father in case of a tragic event. Bates conceded and his father died after he returned home.

== Reception ==
=== Critical response ===
Vincent Canby of The New York Times wrote that "Clayburgh is nothing less than extraordinary in what is the performance of the year to date. In her we see intelligence battling feeling – reason backed against the wall by pushy needs."

Pauline Kael of The New Yorker wrote:

An Unmarried Woman may give Mazursky the popular success that his films Blume in Love, Harry and Tonto and Next Stop, Greenwich Village should have given him – Erica, the heroine, sleeps in a T-shirt and bikini panties. There are so few movies that deal with recognizable people that this detail alone is enough to pick up one's spirits... Jill Clayburgh has a cracked, warbly voice – a modern polluted-city huskiness... When Erica's life falls apart and her reactions go out of control, Clayburgh's floating, not-quite-sure, not-quite-here quality is just right.

On the review aggregator website Rotten Tomatoes, the film holds an approval rating of 90% based on 29 reviews, with an average rating of 7.2/10. The website's critics consensus reads, "Jill Clayburgh is wondrous as a woman who loses her marriage – only to find herself – in this acutely observed and lived-in portrait of New York City life."

=== Accolades ===
Award	Year	Category	Recipient(s)	Result	Ref.
Cannes Film Festival	1978	Palme d'Or	Paul Mazursky	Nominated	
Cannes Film Festival	1978	Best Actress	Jill Clayburgh	Won (Note: Tied with Isabelle Huppert for Violette Nozière)	
Los Angeles Film Critics Association Awards	1978	Best Screenplay	Paul Mazursky	Won	
National Board of Review Awards	1978	Top Ten Films	An Unmarried Woman	7th Place	
Academy Awards	1979	Best Picture	Paul Mazursky and Anthony Ray	Nominated	
Academy Awards	1979	Best Actress	Jill Clayburgh	Nominated	
Academy Awards	1979	Best Writing, Screenplay Written Directly for the Screen	Paul Mazursky	Nominated	
Bodil Awards	1979	Best Non-European Film	Paul Mazursky	Won	
British Academy Film Awards	1979	Best Actress in a Leading Role	Jill Clayburgh	Nominated	
Directors Guild of America Awards	1979	Outstanding Directorial Achievement in Motion Pictures	Paul Mazursky	Nominated	
Golden Globes	1979	Best Motion Picture – Drama	An Unmarried Woman	Nominated	
Golden Globes	1979	Best Actress in a Motion Picture – Drama	Jill Clayburgh	Nominated	
Golden Globes	1979	Best Director	Paul Mazursky	Nominated	
Golden Globes	1979	Best Screenplay	Paul Mazursky	Nominated	
Golden Globes	1979	Best Original Score	Bill Conti	Nominated	
National Society of Film Critics Awards	1979	Best Film	An Unmarried Woman	2nd Place (Note: Tied with The Deer Hunter)	
National Society of Film Critics Awards	1979	Best Actress	Jill Clayburgh	3rd Place	
National Society of Film Critics Awards	1979	Best Screenplay	Paul Mazursky	Won	
New York Film Critics Circle Awards	1979	Best Film	An Unmarried Woman	Runner-up	
New York Film Critics Circle Awards	1979	Best Actress	Jill Clayburgh	Runner-up	
New York Film Critics Circle Awards	1979	Best Director	Paul Mazursky	Runner-up	
New York Film Critics Circle Awards	1979	Best Screenplay	Paul Mazursky	Won	
Writers Guild of America Awards	1979	Best Drama Written Directly for the Screenplay	Paul Mazursky	Nominated	
