= Susan Tyrrell =

American actress (1945–2012)

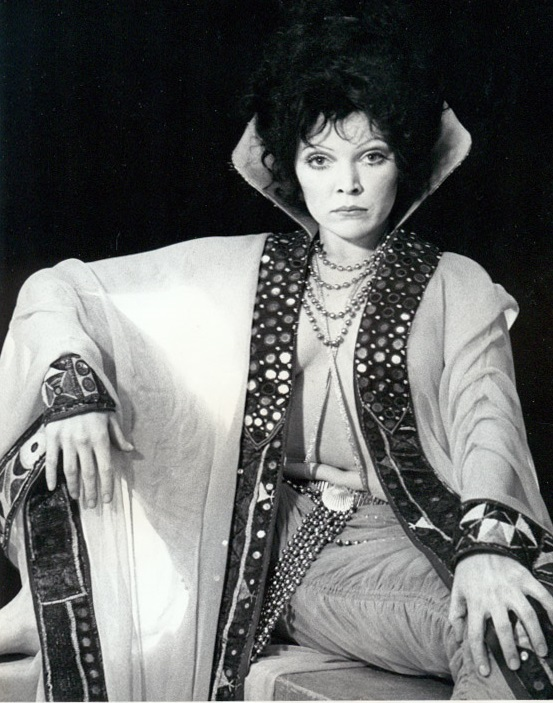
- Publicity still for Camino Real, 1970
- Born: Susan Jillian Creamer; March 18, 1945; San Francisco, California, U.S.
- Died: June 16, 2012 (aged 67); Austin, Texas, U.S.
- Occupation: Actress
- Years active: 1964–2012
- Notable work: Fat City, Andy Warhol's Bad, Forbidden Zone, Butcher Baker Nightmare Maker, Cry-Baby

Susan Tyrrell (born Susan Jillian Creamer; March 18, 1945 – June 16, 2012) was an American character actress. Tyrrell's career began in theater in New York City in the 1960s in Broadway and off Broadway productions. Her first film was Shoot Out (1971). She was nominated for the Academy Award for Best Supporting Actress for her performance as Oma in John Huston's Fat City (1972). In 1978, Tyrrell received the Saturn Award for Best Supporting Actress for her performance in Andy Warhol's Bad (1977). Her New York Times obituary described her as "a whiskey-voiced character actress (with) talent for playing the downtrodden, outré, and grotesque."

== Early life ==
Tyrrell was born in San Francisco, California, to a British mother, Gillian (née Tyrrell; 1913–2012), and an American father, John Belding Creamer. Her mother was a socialite and member of the diplomatic corps in China and the Philippines during the 1930s and 1940s. Her father John was an agent with the William Morris Agency who represented Leo Carrillo, Loretta Young, Ed Wynn, and Carole Lombard.

Tyrrell spent her childhood in New Canaan, Connecticut. She was a poor student and as a teenager became estranged from her mother. Through her father's connections, Tyrrell was employed in the theatrical production of Time Out for Ginger (1963) starring Art Carney in New York City. Her father also persuaded Look magazine to follow her as she toured with the show, but he died shortly afterwards.

== Career ==
Tyrrell made her Broadway debut in 1965 as a replacement performer in the comedy Cactus Flower. In 1968, as a member of the Repertory Theatre of Lincoln Center, she was in the cast of King Lear and revivals of The Time of Your Life (1969) and Camino Real (1970). Off-Broadway, Tyrrell appeared in the 1967 premiere of Lanford Wilson's The Rimers of Eldritch and a 1979 production of Father's Day (play) at The American Place Theatre.

Tyrrell's television debut was in Mr. Novak (1964) and her film debut was in Shoot Out (1971). Tyrrell was nominated for an Academy Award for Best Supporting Actress for her performance as Oma in John Huston's Fat City (1972). In 1976, she played a psychotic character in I Never Promised You A Rose Garden. In 1978, she won the Saturn Award for Best Supporting Actress for her performance in Jed Johnson's Bad (1977).

Later, Tyrrell starred as Queen Doris in the indie Forbidden Zone (1980). She sang the film's song, "Witch's Egg". A year later, she portrayed Vera in Tales of Ordinary Madness (1981). From 1981 to 1982, Tyrrell starred as Gretchen Feester, in the ABC's short-lived situation comedy series Open All Night. She then had a starring role in the exploitation horror film Butcher, Baker, Nightmare Maker (1981).

In 1983, Tyrrell played Solly in the sexploitation film Angel and its 1984 sequel, Avenging Angel. Then followed roles in the adventure film Flesh+Blood, the Vincent Price anthology horror film From a Whisper to a Scream (1987), the animated feature film The Chipmunk Adventure (1987), and Big Top Pee-wee (the 1988 sequel to 1985's Pee-wee's Big Adventure). Tyrrell took a supporting role in John Waters' Cry-Baby (1990).

In 1992, she guest starred on an episode of Wings "Marriage Italian Style" and she performed her own one-woman show, Susan Tyrrell: My Rotten Life, a Bitter Operetta. In the late 1990s, Tyrrell had roles in the Tales from the Crypt episode "Comes the Dawn" (1995), the animated series Extreme Ghostbusters (1997), and the psychological thriller film Buddy Boy (1999).

In the 2000s, Tyrrell appeared in Bob Dylan's Masked and Anonymous (2003) and The Devil's Due at Midnight (2004). Her final appearance was in the 2012 independent film Kid-Thing.

== Personal life ==
Tyrrell moved to New York City in the early 1960s to focus on theater work, for the first time meeting and socializing with openly LGBT people. The artistic crowd of "New York freaks" she associated with included "Andy Warhol people", among them Candy Darling, with whom Tyrrell had a relationship and shared an apartment.

In the mid-1970s, Tyrrell had a two-year relationship with actor Hervé Villechaize and shared a home with him in the Laurel Canyon area of Los Angeles.

Tyrrell had two brief marriages and no children. In 1981 she told an interviewer that she had decided on tubal ligation surgery, "to ensure that no actors come out of me."

Tyrrell suffered from essential thrombocytosis, a disease of the blood. In early 2000, her disease necessitated bilateral below-knee amputations. That year, Johnny Depp hosted a benefit at the Viper Room to help defray Tyrrell's medical bills. Megan Mullally, Jack Black, and Chloe Webb attended.

In 2008, Tyrrell moved to Austin, Texas, to be closer to her niece. In January 2012, Tyrrell wrote in her journal, "I demand my death be joyful and I never return again." She died on June 16, 2012, in Austin. She was cremated and her ashes were scattered.

== Filmography ==
=== Film ===
Year	Title	Role	Notes
1971	The Steagle	Louise	
1971	Been Down So Long It Looks Like Up to Me	Jack	
1971	Shoot Out	Alma	
1972	Fat City	Oma Lee Greer	New York Film Critics Circle Award for Best Supporting Actress (2nd place); National Society of Film Critics Award for Best Supporting Actress (2nd place); Nominated — Academy Award for Best Supporting Actress
1974	Catch My Soul	Emilia	
1974	Zandy's Bride	Maria Cordova	
1974	To Kill the King	Maggie Van Birchard	
1976	The Killer Inside Me	Joyce Lakeland	
1977	Andy Warhol's Bad	Mary Aiken	Saturn Award for Best Supporting Actress
1977	Wizards	Narrator	Voice, Uncredited
1977	Islands in the Stream	Lil	
1977	I Never Promised You a Rose Garden	Lee	
1977	September 30, 1955	Melba Lou	
1977	Another Man, Another Chance	Alice	
1978	Loose Shoes	Boobies	
1979	Racquet	Miss Baxter	
1980	Forbidden Zone	Queen Doris of the Sixth Dimension / Ruth Henderson	
1981	Document of the Dead	Narrator	Voice
1981	Subway Riders	Eleanor Langley	
1981	Butcher, Baker, Nightmare Maker / Night Warning	Cheryl Roberts (Aunt Cheryl)	
1981	Tales of Ordinary Madness	Vera	
1982	Liar's Moon	Lora Mae Bouvier	
1982	Fast-Walking	Evie	
1983	Fire and Ice	Juliana	Voice
1984	Angel	Solly Mosler	
1984	The Killers	Susu, Second Ragpicker	
1985	Avenging Angel	Solly Mosler	
1985	Flesh and Blood	Celine	
1986	The Christmas Star	Sara	
1987	The Chipmunk Adventure	Claudia Furschtein	Voice
1987	From a Whisper to a Scream	Beth Chandler	
1987	The Underachievers	Mrs. Grant	
1988	Tapeheads	Nikki Morton	
1988	Big Top Pee-wee	Midge Montana	
1989	Far from Home	Agnes Reed	
1990	Rockula	Chuck the Bartender	
1990	Cry-Baby	Ramona Rickettes	
1991	Motorama	Bartender	
1992	Susan Tyrrell: My Rotten Life, a Bitter Operetta	The Woman	
1995	The Demolitionist	Mayor Eleanor Grimbaum	
1995	Digital Man	Mildred Hodges	
1995	Powder	Maxine	
1997	Poison Ivy: The New Seduction	Mrs. B	
1997	Pink as the Day She Was Born	Lana	
1998	Relax...It's Just Sex	Alicia Pillsbury	
1999	Buddy Boy	Sal	
1999	Swap Meet		
2003	Masked and Anonymous	Ella the Fortune Teller	
2008	The Boneyard Collection	High Priestess	
2012	Kid-Thing	Esther	Voice; Final film role

=== Television ===
Year	Title	Role	Notes
1964	Mr. Novak	Phyllis Freuchen	Episode: "Beyond a Reasonable Doubt"
1964	The Patty Duke Show	Sue Ellen	Episode: "The Tycoons"
1971	Bonanza	Mrs. Jill Conway	Episode: "Fallen Woman"
1975	Baretta	Pamela / Jenny	Episode: "Double Image"
1976	Starsky and Hutch	Annie / Isabelle Oates	Episode: "The Collector"
1978	Kojak	Mary Torino	Episode: "In Full Command"
1978	Lady of the House	Helen Proctor	TV movie
1981–1982	Open All Night	Gretchen Feester	13 episodes
1986	If Tomorrow Comes	Bertha	1 episode
1987	The Hitchhiker	Doris	Episode: "In the Name of Love"
1988	Windmills of the Gods	Neusa Muñoz Angel	2 episodes
1991	Shades of LA	Rita	Episode: "Send Up the Clowns"
1992	Wings	Sconset Sal	Episode: "Marriage, Italian Style" (as Susan Tyrell)
1995	Tales from the Crypt	Mona	Episode: "Comes the Dawn"
1997	Extreme Ghostbusters	Achira	Voice; Episodes: "Darkness at Noon, Part 1", "Darkness at Noon, Part 2"

=== Theatre ===
Year	Title	Role	Notes
1967	The Rimers of Eldritch	Patsy Johnson	Cherry Lane Theatre
1968	Cactus Flower	Botticelli's Springtime [Replacement] Toni (Understudy) [Replacement]	Broadway
1968	A Cry for Players	Jenny	Broadway
1969	King Lear	Ensemble	Broadway
1969	Invitation to a Beheading	Marthe	The Public Theater
1969	A Cry of Players	Jenny	Broadway
1969	The Time of Your Life	Kitty Duval	Broadway
1970	Camino Real	Esmeralda	Repertory Theater of Lincoln Center
1979	Father's Day (play)	Louise	The American Place Theatre
1992	Susan Tyrrell: My Rotten Life, a Bitter Operetta	The Woman	
1997	The Joy of Going Somewhere Definite	Patsy, Older Woman, Waitress	Center Theatre Group

== Awards and nominations ==
Year	Work	Award	Category	Result
1973	Fat City	NSFC Award	Best Supporting Actress	Nominated
1973	Fat City	NYFCC Award	Best Supporting Actress	Nominated
1973	Fat City	Academy Award	Best Supporting Actress	Nominated
1978	Andy Warhol's Bad	Saturn Award	Best Supporting Actress	Won
