= Robert Vincent O'Neil =

American screenwriter, film director, and playwright (1930–2022)

- Born: September 15, 1930
- Died: March 12, 2022 (aged 91)
- Occupations: Screenwriter, film director, playwright
- Known for: Angel

Robert Vincent O’Neil (September 15, 1930 – March 12, 2022) was an American screenwriter, film director, and playwright. He was best known for directing and co-writing the film Angel. He co-wrote such films as The Baltimore Bullet and Vice Squad, and created the television series Lady Blue.

O'Neil died on March 12, 2022, at the age of 91.
