= Mitzi Kapture =

American television & film actress (born 1962)

- Born: Mitzi Gaynor Donahue; May 2, 1962 (age 64); Yorba Linda, California, U.S.
- Other name: Mitzi Kapture Donahue
- Occupation: Actress
- Years active: 1980–present
- Children: 2

Mitzi Kapture (born Mitzi Gaynor Donahue; May 2, 1962) is an American actress, known for her role as Sgt. Rita Lee Lance in the CBS/USA Network crime drama series Silk Stalkings from 1991 to 1995.

== Life and career ==
Kapture was born in Yorba Linda, California, and raised in Atlanta, Georgia. After appearing as a contestant on $100,000 Pyramid, she began her career in films such as Lethal Pursuit (1988), Angel III: The Final Chapter (1988), Liberty & Bash (1989), and The Vagrant (1992), before moving to television. She gained exposure with her first regular series role as Sergeant Rita Lee Lance in the television series Silk Stalkings. Silk Stalkings premiered on CBS and USA, but later moved solely to USA Network. The show aired for eight seasons and became USA network's highest-rated original drama series. She played Rita, the other half of the two "Sams" for almost five years. Paired with Rob Estes, who played Sergeant Chris Lorenzo, Kapture gained recognition along with her co-star. Sergeant Lance eventually became Lieutenant Lance by the time Kapture left the series in 1995 to have her first daughter. During her time with the series, Kapture also directed episodes.

Kapture returned to television in 1997, starring in two made-for-USA-Network movies. She played lead roles in USA Pictures Originals telemovies, Perfect Crime (based on a true story, also called Hide and Seek: The Joanne Jensen Story), which also starred Jasmine Guy, and His Bodyguard with Robert Guillaume. She returned to series television in a lead role on Baywatch as Alexis Ryker.

From 2002 through 2005, she played the seductive Anita Hodges on the CBS daytime soap opera The Young and the Restless, credited as Mitzi Kapture Donahue. She also starred in the made-for-Lifetime television movie Night of Terror, which premiered March 26, 2007. In her latest film, she played the role of a therapist specializing in autism in the independent feature God's Ears, released in 2008 and on DVD in 2012. In 2010, she guest-starred in an episode of the CBS sitcom Rules of Engagement.

== Filmography ==
Year	Title	Role	Notes
1987	House II: The Second Story	Cowgirl	
1987	Private Road: No Trespassing	Helen Milshaw	
1988	Lethal Pursuit	Debra J.	
1988	MacGyver	Katie	Episode: "Rock the Cradle"
1988	Angel III: The Final Chapter	Molly Stewart / Angel	
1989	Liberty & Bash	Sarah	
1989	1st & Ten	Colleen	Episode: "Love and Marriage"
1991	MacGyver	Laura Bartlett	Episode: "The Wasteland"
1991	Perry Mason: The Case of the Maligned Mobster	Janice Kirk	Television film
1992	The Vagrant	Edie Roberts	
1991–1995	Silk Stalkings	Sgt. Rita Lee Lance	Series regular, 101 episodes
1997	Perfect Crime	Joanne Jensen	Television film
1998	His Bodyguard	Jenny Farrell	Television film
1998–1999	Baywatch	Alex Ryker	Series regular, 22 episodes
1999	The Storytellers	Marcie Russell	
1999	Pumpkin Hill	Lisa	Short film
2003	She Spies	Charlotte Hill	Episode: "Manhunt"
2002–2005	The Young and the Restless	Anita Hodges	Series regular
2006	Night of Terror	Jill Dunne	Television film
2008	God's Ears	Dr. Kerry Jeffus	
2010	Rules of Engagement	Gina	Episode: "Refusing to Budget"
2013	The Executive	Daphne	Short film
