= Vampyre (album) =

Vampyre: Symphonies from the Crypt

Studio album by Midnight Syndicate
- Released: August 13, 2002
- Recorded: 2002
- Genre: Gothic, dark ambient, neoclassical dark wave, darkwave, ambient
- Length: 49:57
- Label: Entity Productions
- Producer: Edward Douglas; Gavin Goszka

Midnight Syndicate chronology
Gates of Delirium (2001)	Vampyre: Symphonies from the Crypt (2002)	Dungeons and Dragons (2003)

Vampyre: Symphonies from the Crypt is the fifth studio album by Midnight Syndicate, released August 13, 2002 by Entity Productions. Centering on themes surrounding vampire lore, gothic literature, and classic horror films, the album featured the band's "symphonic horror" blend of dark, synth-created orchestral music and soundscape. The album features cover art by fantasy artist, Keith Parkinson.

== Background and release ==
In a 2002 interview, composer Edward Douglas said this of the album:

The focus of Vampyre is really on the music and its role in helping the listener craft their own story for the disc. When writing, we wanted to create pieces that incorporated the multiple levels of the vampyre: the hunger, the reflection, the predators, the prey, the passion, and the fury. There are very few sound effects and the tracks are generally longer than those on our previous releases. This doesn't necessarily indicate a change in direction for the band, it's just that we try and offer our listeners something different on every album.

The album was released through Entity Productions and self-distributed nationally through chains like Spencer Gifts and Hot Topic as well as in costume shops, hobby shops, Halloween-merchandise retailers like Halloween Adventure, and in theme parks like Disneyland during the Halloween season. The CD release party was held at the Phantasy Nite Club in Cleveland, and featured haunted house actors performing choreographed mini-scenes.

== Reception ==
Horror magazine, Rue Morgue, called the album "a return to the more gothic flavourings" of the band's 1999 release, Realm of Shadows, with Mike Ventarola of the gothic music magazine Legends adding that the album "brings listeners through many layers of a storyline, not by spoken prose but through inflections and nuances of sound that create a wordless script."

In the haunted attraction industry where Midnight Syndicate's music was used in haunted houses and at amusement parks like Cedar Point, Universal Studios Florida, Paramount Parks, and Six Flags, Jim O'Rear of Underground Entertainment Magazine lauded the album's blend of gothic atmosphere and classical music adding that it, and the band's previous releases, were the most commonly used albums in the haunted attraction industry.

The album also saw the band's popularity in the role-playing game industry expand with Gene Vogel of National Gamers Guild lamenting that adding music to role-playing games hadn't been explored much to that point while praising the album's suitability for use in table top games. A review in Gothic Beauty Magazine called it the "perfect accompaniment for Live action role-playing games (LARPs) and RPGs."

On September 11, 2009, AOL Radio released a list of the Top 10 Best Halloween Music CDs as ranked by AOL/CBS Radio listeners. Vampyre was ranked No. 3 behind Danny Elfman's The Nightmare Before Christmas and John Carpenter's Halloween soundtrack.

== Track listing ==
No.	Title	Writer(s)	Length
1.	"Awakening"	Edward Douglas	4:54
2.	"Graveyard"	Edward Douglas	2:17
3.	"Unhallowed Ground"	Gavin Goszka	3:30
4.	"Crypt of the Forsaken"	Edward Douglas	3:42
5.	"Winged Fury"	Gavin Goszka	5:18
6.	"Blackest Rose"	Gavin Goszka	4:23
7.	"Ravages of Time"	Gavin Goszka	3:23
8.	"Catacombs"	Edward Douglas	2:43
9.	"Unseen Eyes"	Gavin Goszka	1:16
10.	"Undead Hunters"	Edward Douglas	3:18
11.	"Ancient Tomes"	Gavin Goszka	5:07
12.	"Dusk"	Edward Douglas	1:22
13.	"Spectral Masquerade"	Edward Douglas	2:42
14.	"Vampyre"	Edward Douglas	6:02

== Personnel ==
- Edward Douglas – composer
- Gavin Goszka – composer

== Production ==
- Producers – Edward Douglas, Gavin Goszka
- Mixing and Engineering – Edward Douglas, Gavin Goszka
- Mastering – Gavin Goszka
- Cover art – Keith Parkinson
- Design – Mark Rakocy
- Financial Consultant – Edward P. Douglas
