= Out of the Darkness (Retrospective: 1994–1999) =

Compilation album by Midnight Syndicate
- Released: July 4, 2006
- Recorded: 2006
- Genre: Neoclassical dark wave
- Length: 66:57
- Label: Entity Productions

Midnight Syndicate chronology
| The 13th Hour (2005) | Out of the Darkness (Retrospective: 1994–1999) (2006) | The Rage: Original Motion Picture Soundtrack (2008) |

Out of the Darkness (Retrospective: 1994–1999) is a compilation album by Midnight Syndicate, released July 4, 2006, by Entity Productions. The album features re-recorded and re-mastered tracks from Born of the Night and Realm of Shadows along with four previously unreleased songs the band's early years (1994-1999).

== Album information and release ==
In March 2006, Midnight Syndicate announced that Born of the Night and Realm of Shadows were out of print. and explained in an interview that they would no longer be available for sale. In July of that same year Out of the Darkness (Retrospective: 1994–1999) was released featuring re-recorded versions of tracks from the Midnight Syndicate (1997), Born of the Night (1998), and Realm of Shadows (2000) albums and tracks from Edward Douglas' early scores for his films Journey into Dementia (1994) and The Dead Matter (1996) and a previously unreleased track by Gavin entitled, Prisoner of Time.

In a 2006 interview, composer, Gavin Goszka said, "It's been over seven years since we originally recorded most of those songs, and our technology and technique have improved... This gives us an opportunity to reissue the songs closer to what we originally envisioned." Composer, Edward Douglas referred to the Out of the Darkness material as "what we consider our best horror-genre material from the early years." The album artwork was created by fantasy artist, Rob Alexander, who also created a number of works for Magic: the Gathering games.

The album was released through Entity Productions and self-distributed through Halloween retailers like Spencer Gifts, costume shops, and hobby shops.

== Style ==
Side-Line Magazine described the album as remaining in the band's universe of "imaginary horror films"-style calling it a "fusion of orchestral arrangements and dark horror-like impressions." Gothic Beauty noted the album featured fewer "scary" sound tricks than previous albums adding that although it was "made-for-Halloween theatrics" several tracks were too grandiose to be "horror camp."

== Post-release ==
In 2013, the track Into The Abyss was featured as outro music following track 14, Saturday Night on the Misfits live album, Dead Alive!. In 2015, Rue Morgue Magazine included Out of the Darkness in its list of 50 Essential Horror Albums - Discs That Created, Evolved, or Defined Genre Music Through the Decades citing the band's influence in the haunted attraction industry and "entrenchment" in the celebration of the Halloween season as reasons for its inclusion.

== Track listing ==
| No. | Title | Writer(s) | Originally released on | Length |
|---|---|---|---|---|
| 1. | "Realm of Shadows" | Douglas | Realm of Shadows | 2:54 |
| 2. | "Darkness Descends" | Douglas | Born of the Night | 2:06 |
| 3. | "Born of the Night" | Douglas | Born of the Night | 3:07 |
| 4. | "Return of the Apparition" (Previously released as "The Apparition" on Born of the Night.) | Goszka | Born of the Night | 1:06 |
| 5. | "Legions of the Night" | Douglas | Realm of Shadows | 2:45 |
| 6. | "Eye of the Storm" | Douglas | Realm of Shadows | 2:40 |
| 7. | "Solemn Reflections" | Goszka | Born of the Night | 2:51 |
| 8. | "Nightstalker" | Douglas | Born of the Night | 2:40 |
| 9. | "Noctem Aeternus" | Douglas | Realm of Shadows | 2:33 |
| 10. | "Haunted Nursery" | Douglas | Born of the Night | 1:31 |
| 11. | "Sanctuary" | Goszka | Realm of Shadows | 2:33 |
| 12. | "Into the Abyss" | Goszka | Realm of Shadows | 4:50 |
| 13. | "The Night Beckons" | Douglas | Realm of Shadows | 2:25 |
| 14. | "Masque of Sorrow" | Goszka | Born of the Night | 2:05 |
| 15. | "Forbidden Crypts" | Douglas | Born of the Night | 2:13 |
| 16. | "Theme to The Dead Matter (Vampire's Kiss)" (previously appeared as "Theme to The Dead Matter" in 1996 film and on Midnight Syndicate in 1997. Re-released as "Vampire's Kiss" (Theme to The Dead Matter) on Born of the Night in 1998.) | Douglas | Midnight Syndicate , Born of the Night | 2:17 |
| 17. | "Darkfolk (Shadows)" (Released as "Dark Folk" on Midnight Syndicate, then as "Shadows (Darkfolk)" on Born of the Night in 1998.) | Douglas | Midnight Syndicate, Born of the Night | 3:06 |
| 18. | "Soliloquy" | Douglas | Realm of Shadows | 3:04 |
| 19. | "Beyond the Gates" | Douglas | Realm of Shadows | 2:14 |
| 20. | "Eclipse" | Douglas | Realm of Shadows | 3:25 |
| 21. | "Scenes from The Dead Matter" | Douglas | The Dead Matter _{(1996 film)} | 1:57 |
| 22. | "Prisoner of Time" | Goszka | (Previously unreleased) | 4:43 |
| 23. | "Theme to Journey Into Dementia" (Journey Into Dementia was a short film in 1994. The first audio release was a techno mix on Midnight Syndicate in 1997.) | Douglas | Journey Into Dementia _{(1994 short)}, Midnight Syndicate | 2:36 |
| 24. | "Druids" | Angus, Douglas | Midnight Syndicate | 5:16 |

== Personnel ==
- Edward Douglas – Music Written, Performed, and Produced by
- Gavin Goszka – Music Written, Performed, and Produced by
- Greg Zydyk - Engineered and Mixed by
- Scott Angus and Edward Douglas - Druids written by
- Christopher Robichaud and Jami Douglas - Additional voices on Druids
- Scott Angus - Drums and Keyboards on Druids
- Mark Rakocy - Photography by
- Rob Alexander - Cover art by
- Brainstorm Studios - Design and layout by
