= The 13th Hour =

Studio album by Midnight Syndicate
- Released: June 7, 2005
- Recorded: 2005
- Genres: Gothic, dark ambient, neoclassical dark wave, darkwave, ambient
- Length: 56:23
- Label: Entity Productions
- Producers: Edward Douglas; Gavin Goszka

Midnight Syndicate chronology
Dungeons and Dragons (2003)	The 13th Hour (2005)	Out of the Darkness (Retrospective: 1994–1999) (2006)

The 13th Hour is the sixth studio album by Midnight Syndicate, released June 7, 2005, by Entity Productions. The album took listeners on a journey through a haunted Victorian mansion through the blend of symphonic gothic horror instrumental music and horror-inspired soundscape the band had become known for. Since its release, it has become one of the band's most popular titles, winning awards in the gaming industry and inspiring the prequel-themed album, Bloodlines, in 2021.

== Background ==
In a 2005 interview, composer Gavin Goszka said this of the album:

We feel that The 13th Hour is definitely our best work to date, both musically as well as atmospherically. The sound effects were based on real-life stories of paranormal experiences ... the (album) is our audio interpretation of an actual haunted house.

Both Goszka and Edward Douglas also credit their love of ghost stories, horror movies, and their studio (a fully restored Victorian era home) as further inspiration for the album. Douglas mentioned that some of the soundscape on the album was inspired by a presentation George Lutz gave describing his experiences in the house that became the basis for the book, The Amityville Horror. The album is set in the personal residence of the doctor who created Haverghast Asylum, a fictitious turn-of-the-century haunted mental institution first introduced on the band's 2001 release, Gates of Delirium.

== Album information and release ==
The cover artwork was created by fantasy artist, Keith Parkinson. The album featured vocal effects by Lily Lane of the band, Lazy Lane as the character, Madeline Haverghast. Douglas called Lily's vocal performance "perfect" adding "she was so critical to (the album)." The track Footsteps in the Dust featured Douglas' 2-year-old daughter.

The album was released through Entity Productions and self-distributed nationally through chains like Spencer Gifts and Hot Topic, as well as in costume shops, game stores, and Halloween-merchandise retailers like Spirit Halloween The band held a press preview at the purportedly haunted Agora Theater and Ballroom followed by a release party at the Phantasy Nite Club where a psychic, and haunted house actors entertained guests followed by performances by the bands Lazy Lane, Filament 38, and State of Being.

== Reception ==
Belgium's Side Line Magazine praised how the soundscape elements took the album further than typical horror film scores. Outburn, Movement, and Rue Morgue Magazines called it the band's best work to date with Outburn and Rue Morgue adding that the band had "revolutionized and redefined the Halloween horror music genre."

The 13th Hour album won Best Gaming Accessory at the 32nd Origins Awards presented by the Academy of Adventure Game Art & Design. It marked the first time a music album had won an Origins Award. In 2006, The 13th Hour also became the first music CD to win an award (Silver for Best Aid or Accessory) at the ENnies, a fan-based annual award show for role-playing game publishers and products.

== Post-release ==
In 2021, Midnight Syndicate created a prequel to The 13th Hour entitled, Bloodlines. Designed to be listened to first and segued into Mansion in the Mist, Bloodlines expands upon the backstory of the Haverghast family and the events that transpired before the story in The 13th Hour begins.

== Track listing ==
No.	Title	Writer(s)	Length
1.	"Mansion in the Mist"	Edward Douglas	1:03
2.	"Forgotten Path"	Douglas	1:30
3.	"Time Outside of Time"	Gavin Goszka	3:42
4.	"Fallen Grandeur"	Goszka	2:54
5.	"Hands of Fate"	Douglas, Goszka	0:47
6.	"The Drawing Room"	Douglas	1:30
7.	"Mausoleum d'Haverghast"	Douglas	2:15
8.	"Family Secrets"	Douglas	3:07
9.	"Last Breaths"	Douglas, Goszka	0:21
10.	"Vertigo"	Goszka	1:40
11.	"The Watcher"	Goszka	3:36
12.	"Cellar"	Douglas, Goszka	0:54
13.	"Cold Embrace"	Goszka	3:27
14.	"Hand in Hand Again" (performed by Albert Campbell, Henry Burr with effects and overdubs by Midnight Syndicate)	Richard A. Whiting, Raymond B. Egan	1:16
15.	"Harvest of Deceit"	Douglas	3:43
16.	"Footsteps in the Dust"	Douglas	1:51
17.	"Veiled Hunter"	Douglas	2:00
18.	"Sinister Pact"	Goszka	3:21
19.	"Grisly Reminder"	Goszka	1:51
20.	"Deadly Intentions"	Douglas	0:55
21.	"The Lost Room"	Douglas	3:22
22.	"Living Walls"	Goszka	3:30
23.	"Gruesome Discovery"	Douglas	1:29
24.	"Return of the Ancient Ones"	Douglas	3:14
25.	"The 13th Hour"	Douglas	2:35

== Personnel ==
- Edward Douglas – composer
- Gavin Goszka – composer
- Lily Lane – voice actor Madeline Haverghast
- David Jacobs – voice actor
- Greg Ballato – voice actor
- Mary Kate Douglas – voice actor Anastasia Haverghast

== Production ==
- Producers – Edward Douglas, Gavin Goszka
- Mixing and Engineering – Edward Douglas, Gavin Goszka
- Mastering – Gavin Goszka
- Artwork – Keith Parkinson
- Photography – Anthony Gray
- Text (story in packaging) – Patrick Kapera

== Song information ==
The song, Hand in Hand Again was written in 1919 by Richard A. Whiting and Raymond B. Egan as an answer song to their hugely popular "Till We Meet Again" from 1918.
