= Christmas: A Ghostly Gathering =

Studio album by Midnight Syndicate
- Released: September 10, 2015
- Genre: Christmas music, neoclassical dark wave
- Label: Entity Productions
- Producer: Edward Douglas, Gavin Goszka

Midnight Syndicate chronology
Axe Giant: Original Motion Picture Soundtrack (2013)	Christmas: A Ghostly Gathering (2015)	Zombies!!! Official Board Game Soundtrack (2016)

Christmas: A Ghostly Gathering is the eighteenth album by Midnight Syndicate. The album features a mix of re-imagined Christmas carols and original compositions in a style similar to the band's other gothic, paranormal, and Halloween-themed releases. Midnight Syndicate founder and composer, Edward Douglas, said it's one of his favorite albums they've ever created.

== Background and album information ==
In an interview with InPark Magazine a year after the album's release, composer, Edward Douglas said this:

A Christmas album with a Midnight Syndicate twist is something we’d wanted to do for years. The traditions of Christmas as celebrated around the world are seeped in the supernatural and in folk tales passed down from generation to generation. Those stories and traditions were a tremendous source of inspiration for the music on this album. Additionally, the haunting quality to some of the older carols lent themselves well to what we wanted to do. It was extremely important to both Gavin and myself that we be very respectful of the music and the traditions of holidays. I like to think of this album as hauntingly beautiful as opposed to very dark. We have some fun taking a few uptempo tracks down a creepier path but it’s all done carefully so as not to go too far. I think that is one of the reasons this album has appealed to so many different people.

In an interview with Gothic Beauty, Gavin Goszka said the band wanted to do more than take Christmas songs and "redo them in minor keys", adding many of the songs were completely re-imagined and that the band's musical palette had never been more varied.

The album included four original tracks: Night of the Krampus, Little Helpers, Winter Storm, and Christmas at Midnight. The track, Little Helpers featured vocal artist, Dennis Carter Jr., who previously portrayed, Laughing Denny in the band's Carnival Arcane album. The album artwork was created by French illustrator and matte painter, Pascal Casolari.

== Reception ==
Aaron Von Lupton of the horror magazine, Rue Morgue, called the album's darkness "more subtle and genuine" than he typically saw when horror was mixed with a Christmas setting, adding that the holiday music was "redone with Midnight Syndicate's unique stamp, reflecting beauty, fantasy, and the supernatural." On his America's Most Haunted website, Blogcritics founder, Eric Olsen praised the album's roots in the Victorian era tradition of telling ghost stories during Christmas. Justin Dark of the horror website, Dread Central called the album "a creepy and dark tribute to (Christmas)" and a "masterful collection of holiday spooky," while lamenting that some of the original songs got lost in their new "comprehensive" rearrangements. Several horror blog sites like Mr. Fright's and Gross Movie Reviews as well as haunted house-related YouTuber page, DEAD with Dave, praised the album's appeal to fans of horror while Sue Granquist of the fantasy and role-playing game-related online publication, Black Gate Magazine, called the album "charmingly haunting." While giving the album a "7 out of 10," Outburn Music Magazine's Kevin Stewart-Panko added "if you want to put a dampened pallor on holiday cheer, here's some ammunition."

== Other appearances ==
In 2017, Edward Douglas' version of Dance of the Sugar Plum Fairy was featured in the SyFy television series, Happy! in the episode When Christmas Was Christmas.

== Track listing ==
No.	Title	Writer(s)	Arrangement	Length
1.	"Christmas Overture"	Various	Edward Douglas	2:18
2.	"Dance of the Sugar Plum Fairy"	Pyotr Ilyich Tchaikovsky	Edward Douglas	3:38
3.	"Carol of the Bells"	Mykola Leontovych	Gavin Goszka	2:54
4.	"Night of the Krampus"	Edward Douglas	Edward Douglas	3:51
5.	"Angels We Have Heard on High"	18th century French	Gavin Goszka	3:40
6.	"Greensleeves"	16th century English	Edward Douglas	3:12
7.	"Up on the Housetop"	Benjamin Hanby	Gavin Goszka	2:38
8.	"God Rest You Merry, Gentlemen"	16th century English	Edward Douglas	4:00
9.	"Coventry Carol"	16th century English	Gavin Goszka	2:34
10.	"Little Helpers"	Edward Douglas	Edward Douglas	2:15
11.	"Sing We Now of Christmas"	15th century French	Gavin Goszka	3:04
12.	"Winter Storm"	Gavin Goszka	Gavin Goszka	3:14
13.	"Into the Stillness"	19th century Austrian	Gavin Goszka	1:46
14.	"The Parade of the Tin Soldiers"	Leon Jessel	Gavin Goszka	3:47
15.	"Everywhere, Everywhere, Christmas Tonight"	Philips Brooks, Lewis Redner	Edward Douglas	1:47
16.	"Christmas at Midnight"	Edward Douglas	Edward Douglas	3:33

== Personnel ==
- Edward Douglas – composer
- Gavin Goszka – composer
- Dennis Carter Jr. – voice actor on Little Helpers

== Production ==
- Producers – Edward Douglas, Gavin Goszka
- Mastering – Gavin Goszka
- Cover art – Pascal Casolari
- Design – Brainstorm Design Group
- Band Photography – Steven Franczek
- Band Photography Design – Topher Adam
