= The Dead Matter (soundtrack) =

The Dead Matter: Original Motion Picture Soundtrack

Soundtrack album by Midnight Syndicate
- Released: July 30, 2010
- Genre: Neoclassical dark wave; film score
- Label: Entity Productions
- Producer: Edward Douglas

Midnight Syndicate chronology
The Dark Masquerade with Destini Beard (2010)	The Dead Matter: Original Motion Picture Soundtrack (2010)	Halloween Music Collection (2010)

The Dead Matter: Original Motion Picture Soundtrack is both the twelfth album, and second movie soundtrack by the band, Midnight Syndicate, released July 30, 2010. The album features the original score to the supernatural horror film, The Dead Matter (2010), composed by Edward Douglas, as well as other songs from the film. The album also contained several remixes of previously released Midnight Syndicate material including one performed by related act, Destini Beard.

== Background and information ==
In 1996 Midnight Syndicate composer, Edward Douglas, directed and scored a micro-budget version of The Dead Matter, shot on S-VHS for under two-thousand US dollars. After its release, he turned his attention to the formation and development of Midnight Syndicate. According to an article in Fangoria, the success of Midnight Syndicate's "soundtracks for imaginary films" caught the attention of horror filmmakers which led to film scoring opportunities. In 2008, the band scored and released the soundtrack to Robert Kurtzman's Rage (see The Rage: Original Motion Picture Soundtrack). That collaboration with Kurtzman led to the creation of The Dead Matter (2010) movie (directed and scored by Edward Douglas) and subsequent release of The Dead Matter: Original Motion Picture Soundtrack.

The soundtrack album featured Edward Douglas' original score to the film, the darkwave song, Lost, by Gavin Goszka, two gothic rock tracks by Lazy Lane, and a heavy metal track by Hipnostic, all of which appeared in the film. Additionally, the soundtrack included a song inspired by the movie entitled The Dead Matter by the heavy metal band, Eternal Legacy and three remixes of previously released Midnight Syndicate songs. One of the remixes, Noctem Aeternus (Masquerade Remix), was taken from the Destini Beard and Midnight Syndicate remix EP, The Dark Masquerade

== Release ==
The Dead Matter: Original Motion Picture Soundtrack was released and self-distributed through Entity Productions, the second largest distributor of Halloween music CDs at the time. The album was also packaged for sale with The Dead Matter (2010) DVD, and Midnight Syndicate's compilation album Halloween Music Collection in a "3-Disc Deluxe Edition." The Deluxe Edition DVD was sold at Hot Topic stores throughout the US in coordination with an online cross-promotional campaign Entity Productions ran with the counter-culture-related clothing and music chain for The Dead Matter film. A zombie-themed music video for the Gavin Goszka's Lost was produced by 529 Films and released along with a music video for Eternal Legacy's track, The Dead Matter, which featured footage from the film. Both music videos were included on the DVD as extras.

== Reception ==
Jeff Treppel of Outburn Music Magazine called the soundtrack "really spooky" adding though, that it "lacked a standout theme" like previous (Midnight Syndicate) releases. Gregory Burkart of Fearnet said Douglas' score departed in some ways from the Midnight Syndicate's usual output, "having moved behind the action (instead of being the main attraction)," but added there were "still some superb atmospheric touches, often reminiscent of John Carpenter's memorable scores." Trevor Tuminski of Rue Morgue Magazine said that while the score "didn't exhume anything new in duo's (Midnight Syndicate's) timeless Halloween music" it would "put the listener on edge," calling out the tracks Possession, Late Night Snack, and Death Is the Answer, but lamenting the tracks with vocals weren't evenly spread out throughout the soundtrack.

== Track listing ==
No.	Title	Writer(s)	Performed by	Length
1.	""The Dead Matter" Main Title"	Edward Douglas	Midnight Syndicate	1:20
2.	"Dangerous Meeting"	Edward Douglas	Midnight Syndicate	2:58
3.	"Entering The Dusk"	Edward Douglas	Midnight Syndicate	1:54
4.	"Unexpected Company"	Edward Douglas	Midnight Syndicate	1:19
5.	"Hollows Point"	Edward Douglas	Midnight Syndicate	3:37
6.	"Ian McCallister"	Edward Douglas	Midnight Syndicate	1:00
7.	"Seance"	Edward Douglas	Midnight Syndicate	1:47
8.	"Sebed Suite"	Edward Douglas	Midnight Syndicate	4:18
9.	"Gretchen And Mark Pym"	Edward Douglas	Midnight Syndicate	1:44
10.	"Late Night Snack"	Edward Douglas	Midnight Syndicate	1:26
11.	"Possession"	Edward Douglas	Midnight Syndicate	3:04
12.	"Death Is The Answer"	Edward Douglas	Midnight Syndicate	1:24
13.	"Trilec Labs"	Edward Douglas	Midnight Syndicate	7:08
14.	"You're So Funny Frank"	Edward Douglas	Midnight Syndicate	1:42
15.	"Sleep"	Edward Douglas	Midnight Syndicate	1:44
16.	"Finale"	Edward Douglas	Midnight Syndicate	6:00
17.	""The Dead Matter" End Credit Suite"	Edward Douglas	Midnight Syndicate	2:34
18.	"Lost"	Gavin Goszka	Gavin Goszka	3:55
19.	"The Graveyard"	Kerri Fabian	Lazy Lane	3:20
20.	"Shadows (Haunt Rocker Remix)"	Edward Douglas (music), Jerry Vayne (remix)	Jerry Vayne with Midnight Syndicate	3:12
21.	"The Dead Matter"	Shaun Vanek, Jason Vanek	Eternal Legacy	3:34
22.	"The Girl Upstairs"	Kerri Fabian	Lazy Lane	3:41
23.	"Noctem Aeternus (Masquerade Remix)"	Edward Douglas (music), Destini Beard (lyrics)	Destini Beard with Midnight Syndicate	2:35
24.	"Graveyard (Dead and Buried Remix)"	Edward Douglas (music), Pat Berdysz (remix)	UV / Pat Berdysz with Midnight Syndicate	3:50
25.	"Ritual"	Blake Hastings	Hipnostic	4:06
26.	"Sean Is In The Ground"	Edward Douglas	Midnight Syndicate	1:35

== Personnel ==
- Edward Douglas – composer
- Gavin Goszka – writer, performer on Lost
- Lazy Lane – writer, performer on The Graveyard, The Girl Upstairs
- Jerry Vayne – guitars and remix on Shadows (Haunt Rocker Remix)
- Eternal Legacy – writer, performer on The Dead Matter
- Destini Beard – lyrics, vocals on Noctem Aeternus (Masquerade Remix)
- Pat Berdysz – remix, performer on Graveyard (Dead and Buried Remix)
- Hipnostic – writer, performer on Ritual

== Production ==
- Producer – Edward Douglas
- Mastering – Gavin Goszka
- Sound effects design – Patrick Giraudi at Virtual Mix
- Assistant music supervisor – Colleen Douglas
- Technical advisor – Jeff Kasunic
- Photography – Darell Day
- Cover art – Mike Digrazia
- Design – Brainstorm Studios
