= Bloodlines (Midnight Syndicate album) =

Studio album by Midnight Syndicate
- Released: August 20, 2021
- Recorded: 2021
- Studio: Apothecary Nine; The Dungeon
- Genre: Neoclassical dark wave
- Length: 26:43
- Label: Entity Productions
- Producer: Edward Douglas; Gavin Goszka

Midnight Syndicate chronology
| Live Shadows (2021) | Bloodlines (2021) | The Brimstone Club (2023) |

Bloodlines is the fourteenth studio album by Midnight Syndicate, released August 20, 2021. It is a prequel to Midnight Syndicate's popular 2005 haunted mansion-themed album, The 13th Hour providing an additional backstory to the cursed Haverghast family and the occurrences that happen before The 13th Hour's narrative begins. Bloodlines is a "cinema of the mind" or "faux soundtrack" album similar to its predecessor, where the track list is a scene guide to a movie that must be imagined while listening.

== Background and album information ==
In an August 2021 interview with Germany's Virus Magazine, composer Gavin Goszka mentioned that the idea for Bloodlines came from Midnight Syndicate's desire to create new material to add to an upcoming vinyl reissue of The 13th Hour. In another interview, he also spoke of the band's interest in extending the backstory of the characters from The 13th Hour, a sinister clan called the Haverghast family which were first introduced on Midnight Syndicate's 2001 release, Gates of Delirium. In the same interview he added that recapturing the sound and feel of The 13th Hour's original classic haunted house story while still taking it in a different direction was the goal. According to composer, Edward Douglas, the events that occur in Bloodlines happen before The 13th Hour but how long before is left up to the listener.

The band has mentioned that making sure Bloodlines flowed seamlessly into The 13th Hour was a priority. As such, the tail end of the album's last track, Sands of Time, is designed to segue directly into Mansion in the Mist, the first track on The 13th Hour. Bloodlines includes a humorous and distorted take on Richard Wagner's Bridal Chorus. Artist, Eddie Mendoza created the cover art for the album.

== Release ==
Bloodlines was released and distributed by Midnight Syndicate's own label, Entity Productions, debuting at #12 on Billboard's Classical Crossover charts. On October 20, a music video for the song Grand Waltz was released. It marked first music video to a studio track to feature both Edward Douglas and Gavin Goszka since the Dark Legacy music video from The Dead Matter: Cemetery Gates.

== Reception ==
The album was favorably received, with fans like Grim D. Reaper of Movie Crypt noting that the album "flows like a throwback to some of Midnight Syndicate’s earliest work but with a modern styling and refined edge — a deliberate work rather than an experimental one." Jeff Szpirglas of Rue Morgue Magazine praised the album's "depth of sound and gothic grandeur" as well as its "real narrative drive, rather than disconnected cuts of mood music." Anne Nickoloff of The Plain Dealer described the album as "lush doomy orchestrations vividly painting a picture of ghoulish adventures" while Cinemusical described its music style as "engaging thematic ideas that have a dark Elfman-esque quality with a bit more growl and Poledouris-style rhythmic ingenuity." Readers of The Aquarian voted it one of their Top Ten Albums for 2021.

== Track listing ==
| No. | Title | Writer(s) | Inspired by | Length |
|---|---|---|---|---|
| 1. | "Bloodlines" | Edward Douglas | | 3:58 |
| 2. | "Servitor" | Gavin Goszka | | 2:45 |
| 3. | "Ancestral Decree" | Gavin Goszka | | 2:55 |
| 4. | "I Won't Tell" | Gavin Goszka | | 2:52 |
| 5. | "Assembly" | Edward Douglas, Gavin Goszka | | 0:34 |
| 6. | "Wedding March" | Edward Douglas | Bridal Chorus, R. Wagner | 3:29 |
| 7. | "Grand Waltz" | Edward Douglas | | 2:47 |
| 8. | "A Light in the Attic" | Gavin Goszka | | 2:39 |
| 9. | "Sands of Time" | Edward Douglas | | 3:41 |

== Personnel ==
- Edward Douglas – composer
- Gavin Goszka – composer

== Production ==
- Producer – Edward Douglas
- Mastering – Gavin Goszka
- Cover art – Eddie Mendoza
- Photography – Anthony Gray
- The 13th Hour cover art – Keith Parkinson
- Graphic Design – Brainstorm Design Group
