= The Dead Matter: Cemetery Gates =

Studio album by Midnight Syndicate
- Released: August 28, 2008
- Recorded: 2008
- Genre: Dark wave; neoclassical dark wave
- Label: Entity Productions
- Producer: Edward Douglas; Gavin Goszka

Midnight Syndicate chronology
| The Rage: Original Motion Picture Soundtrack (2008) | The Dead Matter: Cemetery Gates (2008) | The Dark Masquerade with Destini Beard (2010) |

Alternate cover
- Alternate cover (current)

The Dead Matter: Cemetery Gates is the tenth album of the band Midnight Syndicate, released in 2008. The album consists of original music in band's orchestral, gothic, horror soundtrack-style inspired by the themes in the horror film, The Dead Matter.

== Background and release ==
In an interview with Fearnet, composer, Edward Douglas, said this about The Dead Matter: Cemetery Gates:

Gavin and I wanted to do a new Midnight Syndicate CD for 2008. It had been three years since The 13th Hour and we were anxious to get back to doing an all-original Syndicate release that wasn’t a movie soundtrack. When we were tossing around ideas for the theme for the new disc we thought, “why not The Dead Matter (2010) movie?" Here we had a movie about vampires, zombies, mysticism, and an Egyptian occult relic... perfect material for a Midnight Syndicate disc. We liked it because, although it gave us familiar ground to work from, it also allowed us to explore new territory and bring back a splash of some fantasy elements reminiscent of our Dungeons & Dragons soundtrack. The bonus track Lost was actually written for the movie and will appear in it.

The album was released and self-distributed into counter-culture music chains like Hot Topic and Halloween retailers like Spirit Halloween, through Entity Productions, one of the largest distributors of Halloween music CDs at the time. A music video for the song Dark Legacy was released in March 2010, debuting at the TransWorld Halloween & Attractions Show. The video, filmed in Cleveland's Phantasy Theater, was directed by David Greathouse whose work included music videos for the band, Mushroomhead. The video marked the first time Midnight Syndicate performed live together on stage and featured cameos Mushroomhead band members Jeff Hatrix and "Schmotz".

== Reception ==
The album was named runner-up for Best Horror CD in the 2008 Rondo Awards. Craig Harvey of Movement Magazine compared the minimalistic piano lines on certain tracks to early John Carpenter scores. Tomb Dragomir of Rue Morgue Magazine described it as an "eerie offering of dark soundscapes" adding that "if Midnight Syndicate weren't around at this time of year, I think we would actually have to cancel Halloween."

== Track listing ==
| No. | Title | Writer(s) | Length |
|---|---|---|---|
| 1. | "Cathedral Ruins" | Edward Douglas | 3:03 |
| 2. | "Shadowed Grove" | Gavin Goszka | 1:02 |
| 3. | "Meeting of the Acolytes" | Gavin Goszka | 3:19 |
| 4. | "The Revenants" | Gavin Goszka | 3:26 |
| 5. | "Called from Beyond" | Gavin Goszka | 3:04 |
| 6. | "Nightfall" | Edward Douglas | 3:44 |
| 7. | "The Hunt" | Edward Douglas | 2:56 |
| 8. | "Across the Chasm" | Gavin Goszka | 1:16 |
| 9. | "Cemetery Gates" | Edward Douglas | 3:00 |
| 10. | "Entering the Crypt" | Gavin Goszka | 2:09 |
| 11. | "Alchemist's Chamber" | Edward Douglas | 2:50 |
| 12. | "Tear of Osiris" | Edward Douglas | 1:57 |
| 13. | "Forging the Scarab" | Gavin Goszka | 3:24 |
| 14. | "Shadows Descend" | Edward Douglas | 3:06 |
| 15. | "Inside the Scarab" | Edward Douglas | 1:29 |
| 16. | "Exodus" | Gavin Goszka | 3:46 |
| 17. | "Dark Legacy" | Gavin Goszka | 3:38 |
| 18. | "Lullaby" | Edward Douglas | 1:56 |
| 19. | "Lost" (Performed by Gavin Goszka) | Gavin Goszka | 3:55 |
| 20. | "Not Your Saviour" (Performed by Gavin Goszka) | Gavin Goszka | 3:13 |
| 21. | "Theme to The Dead Matter (A.B.T. Remix)" (Remixed by Gavin Goszka) | Edward Douglas | 2:49 |

== Personnel ==
- Edward Douglas – composer
- Gavin Goszka – composer

== Production ==
- Producers – Edward Douglas, Gavin Goszka
- Mastering – Gavin Goszka
- Album cover design – Brainstorm Studios
- Album photography – Darell Day
