= Monsters of Legend =

Studio album by Midnight Syndicate
- Released: July 19, 2013
- Genre: Neoclassical dark wave
- Label: Entity Productions
- Producer: Edward Douglas, Gavin Goszka

Midnight Syndicate chronology
Carnival Arcane (2011)	Monsters of Legend (2013)	Axe Giant: Original Motion Picture Soundtrack (2013)

Monsters of Legend is the sixteenth studio album by the neoclassical dark wave band Midnight Syndicate. Advertised as a tribute to the Golden Age of Horror, the packaging featured images from Universal Classic Monster films Bride of Frankenstein, Werewolf of London, and Dracula. The album featured the blend of dark orchestral music, sound effects, and audio storytelling that the band had become known for.

== Background and album information ==
In a 2013, interview with Scary Monsters Magazine, composer, Edward Douglas said this about the album:

Monsters of Legend is Midnight Syndicate's tribute to the classic horror films (especially those of Universal and Hammer) that shaped horror cinema. When you listen to the album, we want you to feel like you are a character in one of those classic horror films exploring a place where mysterious townsfolk, a foreboding castle up the cliffs, and any one of the iconic monsters could be lurking right around the corner. The music (which has a very Hammeresque and Herrmannesque feel to it) is blended with sound effects to make you feel like you are right there... especially with headphones (on) or in a quiet room.

In addition to the sixteen new tracks on the album, were five previously released tracks that were given new arrangements and additional material by Edward Douglas. The most notable additions to the old tracks were voice actor, Dick Terhune performing on a new arrangement of the song, Requiem and vocalist Amber Foth (also featured on Carnival Arcane) performing on a new version of Twilight.

== Reception ==
Monsters of Legend received favorable reviews from many horror film bloggers like Theofantastique and Mr. Frights, role-playing game-related publications like Black Gate and Games Gazette, and amusement park sites like, Behind the Thrills. Mr. Dark of the horror website, Dread Central, wrote that: "This is what Midnight Syndicate does best: dark, goth instrumental orchestrations that fit a general theme and provide an excellent mental backdrop to all things horror." Aaron Von Lupton of Rue Morgue Magazine it "mood music for horror fans." Music reviewer, Elise Din, of Side-Line Music Magazine and Halloween and home haunt YouTuber Dave Dankanyin called it the band's best work yet. FEARnet included the album in its Best of 2013: Top 13 Horror-Friendly albums of 2013.

In May 2014, Monsters of Legend won the Best Horror CD category in the 12th annual Rondo Hatton Classic Horror Awards. The album was nominated for Best RPG Related Product in the 2014 ENnie Awards in the role-playing game industry.

== Track listing ==
No.	Title	Writer(s)	Length
1.	"Return to Arcacia"	Edward Douglas	3:31
2.	"Into the Valley of Shadows"	Gavin Goszka	3:30
3.	"A Watchful Gathering"	Edward Douglas	2:19
4.	"Inn of the Weeping Sparrow"	Edward Douglas	3:52
5.	"Unwanted Visitor"	Gavin Goszka	2:54
6.	"Requiem" (new arrangement and material by Edward Douglas)	Gavin Goszka	3:52
7.	"Witching Hour" (new arrangement and material by Edward Douglas)	Edward Douglas	2:57
8.	"Unexpected Cargo"	Edward Douglas	2:01
9.	"Black Woods" (new arrangement and material by Edward Douglas)	Gavin Goszka	3:00
10.	"Twilight" (new arrangement and material by Edward Douglas)	Gavin Goszka	2:48
11.	"Carriage Ride"	Edward Douglas	3:30
12.	"Stone Guardians"	Edward Douglas	3:47
13.	"Ancient Portal"	Edward Douglas	0:25
14.	"Dark Tower" (New Arrangement and Material by Edward Douglas)	Edward Douglas	4:04
15.	"Building the Monster"	Gavin Goszka	4:38
16.	"Lord of the Realm"	Edward Douglas	3:19
17.	"Forgotten Alcoves"	Edward Douglas	0:45
18.	"A Terror Unleashed"	Gavin Goszka	4:16
19.	"Cloistered Cemetery"	Edward Douglas	2:41
20.	"It Lives!"	Gavin Goszka	1:55
21.	"Beyond the Veil of Time"	Edward Douglas	4:20

== Personnel ==
- Edward Douglas – composer
- Gavin Goszka – composer
- Dick Terhune – voice actor on Requiem, Unwanted Visitor

== Production ==
- Producers – Edward Douglas, Gavin Goszka
- Mastering – Gavin Goszka
- Cover art and Design – Brainstorm Design Group
- Band Photography – Beki Ingram, David Henson Greathouse
- Band Photography Design – Topher Adam
- Arcacia Photography – Mark Rakocy

== Release history ==
- Entity Productions MS1016-CD (July 19, 2013): First CD issue
- Entity Productions MS1016-LP (July 19, 2013): First Vinyl issue (250, limited edition, hand-numbered)
