= Realm of Shadows =

Studio album by Midnight Syndicate
- Released: March 6, 2000
- Genre: Neoclassical dark wave; dark ambient
- Length: 52:01
- Label: Entity Productions

Midnight Syndicate chronology
Born of the Night (1998)	Realm of Shadows (2000)	Gates of Delirium (2001)

Reissue cover
- Raven's Hollow: Realm of Shadows Reissue (2016)

Realm of Shadows is the third studio album by American band Midnight Syndicate, released March 6, 2000 by Entity Productions. Musically keeping with the band's blend of dark instrumental music and horror-influenced soundscape, the theme of the album centers around a cursed and abandoned village.

== Album release ==
The album was self-distributed in United States, selling nationally in the United States through chains like Spencer Gifts, Hot Topic, Border Book Stores. The album was also sold in amusement park gift stores at Busch Gardens Williamsburg, and in other retailers of Halloween-related products, such as Mr Fun's, a chain of costume shops based in Cuyahoga Falls, Ohio. Since 2006, the album has been out of print.

== Reception ==
Realm of Shadows, along with their previous release, Born of the Night, helped establish the band's reputation in the haunted attraction and gothic music industries. In an October 2000 interview in The Plain Dealer, band founder, Edward Douglas estimated that about 400 haunted houses and amusement parks were using the music including Cedar Point and Busch Gardens Tampa. In an article in Cleveland Magazine Adrian LePeltier, Director of Show Development at Universal Florida, called the music "the most horrifying he'd ever heard," convincing him to use it in the park's Halloween Horror Nights event. Daniel Hinds of Outburn Magazine said the album "took the band's brand of symphonic horror to a new level," commenting on that the ambient, synth-based instrumentals were a more subtle type of "terror." Side-Line Music Magazine praised the dark tone of album's music created and effectiveness of the artwork. Realm of Shadows, along with Born of the Night, was used as pre-show music for King Diamond's tour in 2000.

== Reissues ==
Several tracks from Realm of Shadows (2000) were reissued on the 2006 album Out of the Darkness (Retrospective: 1994–1999) and in 2010 on Halloween Music Collection.

The album was reissued under the title, Raven's Hollow: Realm of Shadows Reissue on August 25, 2016. In addition to alternate cover art and packaging, the reissue included the previously unreleased tracks: Darkened Shores and Serenade. The track, Prophecy does not appear on the reissue.

== Track listing ==
No.	Title	Writer(s)	Length
1.	"Prophecy" (narration performed by Joseph Vargo)	Edward Douglas, Joseph Vargo	1:49
2.	"Into the Abyss"	Gavin Goszka	5:00
3.	"Noctem Aeternus"	Edward Douglas	2:32
4.	"Tempest"	Edward Douglas	1:19
5.	"Eye of the Storm"	Edward Douglas	2:35
6.	"Sanctuary"	Gavin Goszka	2:32
7.	"Among the Ruins"	Tim Blue	1:47
8.	"Realm of Shadows"	Edward Douglas	2:57
9.	"Raven's Hollow"	Edward Douglas	1:11
10.	"Beyond the Gates"	Edward Douglas	2:02
11.	"The Summoning"	Gavin Goszka	3:13
12.	"Spectral Mist"	Edward Douglas	2:13
13.	"Soliloquy"	Gavin Goszka	3:04
14.	"Twilight"	Gavin Goszka	2:43
15.	"Serpent's Lair"	Gavin Goszka	0:59
16.	"Black Woods"	Gavin Goszka	2:48
17.	"The Night Beckons"	Edward Douglas	2:25
18.	"Legions of the Dead"	Edward Douglas	2:45
19.	"Witching Hour"	Edward Douglas	2:50
20.	"Harbored Souls"	Edward Douglas	1:44
21.	"Eclipse"	Gavin Goszka	3:25

== Personnel ==
- Edward Douglas – composer
- Gavin Goszka – composer
- Tim Blue – composer on Among the Ruins
- Joseph Vargo – narration on Prophecy

== Production ==
- Mixed and Engineered by Tim Blue (assisted by Edward Douglas and Gavin Goszka)
- Artwork by Joseph Vargo for Monolith Graphics
- Photography and Design by Christine Filipak
- Additional Photography by Colleen Douglas
- Financial Consultant: Edward P. Douglas
- Mixed at Mandala Studios
- Mastered at Beachwood Studios
