= Gates of Delirium =

Studio album by Midnight Syndicate
- Released: March 3, 2001
- Genre: Gothic, dark ambient, neoclassical dark wave, Halloween music
- Length: 56:29
- Label: Entity Productions
- Producer: Edward Douglas; Gavin Goszka

Midnight Syndicate chronology
Realm of Shadows (2000)	Gates of Delirium (2001)	Vampyre (2002)

Alternate cover
- Original cover (2001-2006)

Gates of Delirium is the fourth studio album by Midnight Syndicate, released March 3, 2001, by Entity Productions. The album is set in the fictitious haunted Haverghast Asylum and features the blend of horror-inspired symphonic music and sound design the band had become known for.

== Background and release ==
Gates of Delirium was written, produced, and mixed by Edward Douglas and Gavin Goszka. In a 2001 interview, Gavin Goszka said that musically, the album encompassed their most intense and involving material to date and, production-wise, was by far their most intricate. Edward Douglas said that he felt they were "truly able to realize their cinema of the mind" concept on Gate of Delirium with the mix of sound effects and music. The album artwork and photography was designed by Mark Rakocy, the same artist who handled the design and artwork for the Midnight Syndicate debut.

The album was released through Entity Productions and self-distributed nationally through chains like Spencer Gifts, Hot Topic, Border Books, Best Buy, as well as in amusement parks, costume shops, and Halloween-merchandise retailers. To mark the release of the album, the group decorated the Tyr nightclub in Lakewood, Ohio to look like a mental institution and had a cast of actors who pretended to be its mad patients.

== Reception and post-release ==
During the 2001 Halloween weekend, six of the band's mp3 singles, including two from Gates of Delirium, were in the Top 20 for all of MP3.com. Daniel Hind of Outburn Magazine called the album impressive with a more developed concept although less eerie than previous releases. Rue Morgue Magazine gave it a 5 out of 5, calling it "choice audio theater" and Haunted Attraction Magazine called it a "masterpiece," praising the versatility of its potential uses in the haunted attraction industry. Jeff Niesel of Cleveland Scene Magazine praised the album's effectiveness and production values adding though that it still suffered from the fact that was "best suited as background music."

Gates of Delirium was among the first Midnight Syndicate albums to receive a review from a table top game/role-playing game publication when, in 2001, Games Unplugged Magazine praised Gates and the band's previous two releases as having the "right balance of power and transparency," adding that they could "serve just about any horror adventure very well." In 2007, Midnight Syndicate teamed up with Goodman Games to produce Cage of Delirium, a Dungeon Crawl Classics role-playing game adventure based on Gates of Delirium which came packaged with the CD. Cage of Delirium was nominated for Best Adventure in the 2007 ENnie Awards.

== Track listing ==
No.	Title	Writer(s)	Length
1.	"Arrival"	Edward Douglas / Gavin Goszka	1:51
2.	"Welcome"	Edward Douglas	2:25
3.	"Haverghast Asylum"	Edward Douglas	3:34
4.	"Halls of Insurrection"	Gavin Goszka	2:41
5.	"Cage of Solitude"	Gavin Goszka	2:36
6.	"Residents Past"	Gavin Goszka	4:07
7.	"Adelaide"	Edward Douglas	1:09
8.	"Phantom Sentinels"	Edward Douglas	2:35
9.	"Gates of Delirium"	Gavin Goszka	3:36
10.	"Non Compos Mentis"	Gavin Goszka	0:56
11.	"Procession of the Damned"	Gavin Goszka	3:12
12.	"Infestation"	Edward Douglas	0:58
13.	"Room 47"	Edward Douglas	2:54
14.	"Dark Discovery"	Gavin Goszka	3:53
15.	"Morbid Fascination"	Edward Douglas	2:36
16.	"Dead of Night"	Edward Douglas	1:41
17.	"Alternative Therapy"	Edward Douglas	3:04
18.	"Crimson Door"	Edward Douglas / Gavin Goszka	1:08
19.	"Unrest in the East Wing"	Edward Douglas	2:47
20.	"Ebony Shroud"	Gavin Goszka	4:09
21.	"Sleep Tight" (contains an unlisted track starting at 3:08)	Edward Douglas	2:22

== Personnel ==
- Edward Douglas – composer
- Gavin Goszka – composer
- Christopher Robichaud – voice actor
- Trishalana Kopaitich – voice actor
- Dana Armstrong – voice actor
- Ted Neroda – voice actor

== Production ==
- Producers – Edward Douglas, Gavin Goszka
- Mixing – Edward Douglas, Gavin Goszka
- Mastering – Gavin Goszka
- Artwork, Photography, Design – Mark Rakocy
- Financial Consultant – Edward P. Douglas

== Release history ==
- Entity Productions MS1004-CD (March 6, 2001): First CD issue
- Entity Productions MS1004-CD (2006): CD reissue with alternate cover art by Rob Alexander
