= Dungeons & Dragons (album) =

Soundtrack album by Midnight Syndicate
- Released: August 12, 2003
- Genre: Neoclassical dark wave; dungeon synth
- Length: 64:56 (approximate)
- Label: Entity Productions; Darkcell
- Producer: Edward Douglas and Gavin Goszka

Midnight Syndicate chronology
Vampyre (2002)	Dungeons & Dragons (2003)	The 13th Hour (2005)

Dungeons & Dragons is a studio album by the American musical group Midnight Syndicate, released August 12, 2003, by Entity Productions. The album is designed as a soundtrack to the Dungeons & Dragons role-playing game and was produced by Midnight Syndicate at the request of Wizards of the Coast, the company that owns the rights to the Dungeons & Dragons franchise. Midnight Syndicate was approached by game designers at a gaming convention where they had set up stall, and they agreed to produce the album.

After an initial meeting with Wizards of the Coast, the two members of Midnight Syndicate—Edward Douglas and Gavin Goszka—were left to write and produce the album themselves. They went their separate ways and produced tracks independently of one another, but came back together to arrange the album and master the tracks. The album was a change in style for Midnight Syndicate, because most of it had a fantasy feel, whereas their earlier works had been almost entirely horror-based. Artwork within the album booklet came from Dungeons & Dragons sourcebooks, including works from prominent game designers such as Skip Williams. The album was well received by Wizards of the Coast, with positive reviews from music critics and the gaming community. It was the first official Dungeons & Dragons soundtrack.

== Conception and production ==
According to Bob Ignizio of Utter Trash, an ezine featuring "music, movies and more", Midnight Syndicate's older albums had already been used as background music to role-playing sessions for many years. Wizards of the Coast described the band's music as "the perfect accompaniment to role-playing game sessions". Support for Midnight Syndicate's music as a role-playing aid grew so much that the band decided to set up stalls at gaming conventions. At their first convention, Midnight Syndicate was approached by Wizards of the Coast, which subsequently asked if they would be interested in recording an official soundtrack, to which they agreed.

Before the band started writing or recording music they sat down with the Dungeons & Dragons designers, who informed them of several elements that were essential on the album. According to Ed Stark, the special project manager of Wizards of the Coast, this consisted of "a chase scene and a fight scene and things like that". This was new to the band who had never written music to fit someone else's ideas before. Stark said, however, that "they really got that. We were very impressed, because we're in sort of a niche industry, and we're not always used to people getting exactly what we need right away". After this, the band was mostly left to deal with the music themselves. The designers were already familiar with Midnight Syndicate's music and knew what to expect from the album. As inspiration for earlier albums had sometimes come from Dungeons & Dragons gaming sessions, Douglas said that writing the album came very naturally.

After the initial meeting with game designers, the album was written in the same way Midnight Syndicate conventionally write. First, Douglas and Goszka agreed on the setting they were trying to create with the album and then filled in details about the setting. Once this was done, they worked on music separately, in their own different studios. They remained in contact throughout the writing process to ensure that their work was cohesive and appropriate for the album. Once writing was complete, they worked together on arranging, mastering and mixing the tracks.

Douglas said that, for him, instrument choice came naturally and that "sounds and sometimes even melodies fall in line themselves". The band had a wide number of instruments at their disposal, as all the music is produced on synthesizers. To ensure Douglas stayed true to creating the musical landscape he intended, his studio was covered with Dungeons & Dragons artwork and module covers throughout recording.

Joseph Vargo, the executive producer on Midnight Syndicate's albums Born of the Night and Realm of Shadows, has said that he was the one who initiated the first contact between Wizards of the Coast and the band. Vargo claims that, in 1999, he sent a copy of Born of the Night to Dungeons & Dragons game designer Jason Carl, at the time employed by TSR, who described the album as "terrific gaming music". Vargo also says that he sent a copy of Realm of Shadows to Carl a year later, and this communication helped forge the link between the band and Dungeons & Dragons game designers.

=== First soundtrack ===
Wizards of the Coast claimed that the album was the first official Dungeons & Dragons soundtrack, and this was repeated by other groups, including Metropolis Mail Order, GamingReport.com, and Skirmisher Game Store. It was not, however, the first official Dungeons & Dragons music. Years earlier, another album, First Quest: The Music, was released by Filmtrax and licensed by TSR, then-owners of Dungeons & Dragons, for Advanced Dungeons & Dragons. The album was released both as a cassette and a record and came with a pre-printed module. Both formats proved unpopular and are difficult to find today. The music on First Quest was keyed specifically to the module that came with it, rather than as a soundtrack to the game in general.

== Musical style ==
According to Mario Mesquita Borges of AllMusic, Midnight Syndicate typically create "darkly blended compositions", described both as "gloomy" and "brooding". Leonard Pickel of Haunted Attraction Magazine stated that "each year, the band's music becomes more a part of America's Halloween culture", and also said that the band had "literally formed their own musical genre". For Douglas, however, Dungeons & Dragons was a different style of music from other albums and soundtracks that the band had produced. Originally, he had described Midnight Syndicate's music as "Gothic Nightmare Soundtracks", but claimed that Dungeons & Dragons had a more fantasy feel than previous releases, which focused more on horror, meaning that he now describes the band's music as "Gothic Fantasy Nightmare Soundtracks". Chris Harvey of Movement Magazine—a magazine supporting "underground" music and arts—described the album as being symphonic, which he claimed added to the feel of the album. Sounds were also sampled, including the sounds of battle on "Final Confrontation", clashing swords on "Skirmish", a mantra on "Eternal Mystery", and spoken words in "Craft of the Wizard".

Peter-Jan Van Damme, the owner of the alternative music ezine Darker than the Bat, described Dungeons & Dragons as going more in the direction of contemporary classical composers such as Trevor Jones, while still retaining the horror sound typical of Midnight Syndicate. The album has been categorized into a range of genres by reviewers, including neoclassical, gothic ambient, ethereal, and gothic rock.

== Reception ==
Wizards of the Coast were happy with the resulting album, with Anthony Valterra, the company's RPG category manager, saying that Midnight Syndicate "have succeeded at capturing the magic of D&D through music". Numerous critics picked up on the idea that new subject matter had resulted in a new feel for the music, with reviewers claiming that the fantasy influence had given the album a different sound to Midnight Syndicate's gothic horror soundtracks. An unnamed writer for the now-defunct Living Dead Girls ezine said that Dungeons & Dragons "brings a wider range of songs than Midnight Syndicate produces for their Gothic horror soundtracks", meaning that the album "displays for the first time the diversity and musical craft [of which] Midnight Syndicate is capable". GamingReport.com claimed that the album "furthered the band's establishment as the leading producer/supplier of music to the hobby game industry". Dungeons & Dragons became the best-selling role-playing game soundtrack ever in its first month of release, and Leonard Pickel of Haunted Attraction Magazine claimed that the album helped spread the band's popularity to Europe where "Halloween and Haunted Attractions are just beginning to take hold".

The album was criticized by Marc Shayed, of the hobby gaming news site GamingReport.com, for focusing too much on combat and ambiance. He explained that there was only one track that felt triumphant ("City of Sails") and no tracks suitable for traveling or character "down time", which are standards in fantasy gaming. Despite these perceived gaps, he did call it the "ultimate" gaming soundtrack. The album was further criticized by Gene Vogal of the National Gamers Guild who said that it lacked a lot of the "oomph" that Vampyre had, and thought Wizards of the Coast may have been to blame for it. He did think that the album's being composed explicitly for D&D made it superior to music not specifically composed for games (e.g., film soundtracks) as a gaming aid. He criticized the soundtrack for being less original than Vampyre, and sounding much like The Lord of the Rings soundtracks. Other critics compared the album's music to the work of Danny Elfman and the soundtrack of Conan the Barbarian.

== Personnel ==
The album was written and produced by Edward Douglas and Gavin Goszka, the only two members of Midnight Syndicate. The album's graphical design was executed by Mark Rakocy and Jeff Visgaitis, with "additional design" credited to "Stan!" The album heralded a change in production for Midnight Syndicate, as it was the first album for which the band hired a professional writer for descriptions in the album booklet and the blurb. Before this point, the descriptions had been written by Douglas or by Vargo, who had also been responsible for artwork in some earlier albums. Artwork for the album was taken from Dungeons & Dragons role-playing sourcebooks. Douglas said that he was "a huge fan of Dungeons & Dragons artwork, so having free reign [sic] on that material was fun". This artwork was praised by Gene Vogal, who described it as "one plus to the possible Wizards of the Coast interference" and said that the "CD jacket was done very nicely and has some cool artwork throughout". The album contains artwork by the game designers Todd Lockwood and Skip Williams, as well as from the artists Scott Fischer, Brian Snoddy, Lars Grant-West, Wayne Reynolds, Mark Tedin, and Sam Wood.

== Track listing ==
No.	Title	Writer(s)	Length
1.	"Prelude"	Gavin Goszka	2:14
2.	"Troubled Times"	Goszka	4:37
3.	"Ride to Destiny"	Edward Douglas	4:11
4.	"The Fens of Sargath"	Douglas	1:30
5.	"Descent into the Depths"	Douglas	3:27
6.	"Stealth and Cunning"	Douglas	1:16
7.	"Behind Door #1"	Douglas; Goszka	0:37
8.	"Skirmish"	Goszka	4:30
9.	"Eternal Mystery"	Goszka	3:55
10.	"Heroes' Valor"	Douglas	3:09
11.	"Relic Uncovered"	Douglas	1:47
12.	"Deep Trouble"	Goszka	1:48
13.	"Chant"	Goszka	0:11
14.	"Craft of the Wizard"	Goszka	3:23
15.	"Beasts of the Borderlands"	Douglas	2:57
16.	"Secret Chamber"	Douglas	2:04
17.	"Lair of the Great Wyrm"	Douglas	3:29
18.	"Ancient Temple"	Douglas	2:43
19.	"How Strange"	Goszka	1:43
20.	"Army of the Dead"	Goszka	4:08
21.	"Final Confrontation"	Douglas	4:47
22.	"Ruins of Bone Hill" (Bonus track.)	Douglas	2:23
23.	"City of Sails" (Bonus track.)	Goszka	3:31
Total length:			64:56 (approximate)

There is a final 36-second bonus track, which sometimes receives no title, and sometimes is named "BOTCH!" The Midnight Syndicate website does not mention the track at all. It is a joke track in which a hapless D&D player summons something from the game into the real world. Chris Harvey of Movement Magazine found the dice-rolling sound effects "hilarious".
