= Christopher Robichaud =

American philosopher and lecturer

Christopher Robichaud (born October 21, 1973) is an American philosopher and lecturer in Ethics and Public Policy at the Harvard Kennedy School of Government. He received his doctorate in philosophy from MIT. His areas of research include ethics, political philosophy, and social epistemology. He also teaches at the Harvard Extension School and the Harvard Graduate School of Education, and in the past has taught at Texas A&M University, the University of Vermont, and Tufts University.

Robichaud often draws upon popular culture, movies, TV shows, and graphic novels to teach philosophical concepts. He is a frequent contributor in The Blackwell Philosophy and Pop Culture Series, with topics including the moral duties of superheroes, the ethics of making vampires, and the military ethics of the Kree-Skrull War. He was also contributing editor in the Dungeons & Dragons, The Walking Dead, and The Watchmen editions. In the classroom, he has championed the use of role-playing games such as a fictional zombie apocalypse to simulate real-time leadership and policy decision-making in times of crises or disaster. In 2014, Robichaud agreed to give an opening lecture at a reenactment of a Black Mass by the Satanic Temple at the Queens Head Pub on Harvard University campus organized by the Harvard University Extension School Cultural Studies Club. The topic of the lecture was religious liberty, and Robichaud planned to explore the ways in which society defines ideas such as hate-speech and tolerance. The event was widely criticized by local Catholic leaders and Harvard affiliates, including Harvard President Drew Faust, and was eventually canceled by the Cultural Studies Club as interest in the event greatly exceeded the bar's capacity.

== Early life and hobbies ==
Robichaud grew up in Chardon, Ohio. In addition to his work in philosophy, Robichaud has pursued side projects in acting and music. He appeared in the 2010 Fantasy Horror film The Dead Matter, and has contributed vocals to the Dark Wave band Midnight Syndicate.
