= The Rage (soundtrack) =

The Rage: Original Motion Picture Soundtrack

Soundtrack album by Midnight Syndicate
- Released: February 26, 2008
- Genre: Neoclassical dark wave
- Label: Entity Productions
- Producer: Edward Douglas

Midnight Syndicate chronology
Out of the Darkness (Retrospective: 1994–1999) (2006)	The Rage: Original Motion Picture Soundtrack (2008)	The Dead Matter: Cemetery Gates (2008)

The Rage: Original Motion Picture Soundtrack is both the ninth album and first movie soundtrack by the band Midnight Syndicate, released February 26, 2008. The album features the score to the 2007 horror film, The Rage, composed by Edward Douglas.

== Background and release ==
After leaving the KNB EFX Group in 2003, Rage, director, Robert Kurtzman moved to Ohio to form Precinct 13 Entertainment. In a 2010 interview, Kurtzman said: When I came to Ohio, I wanted to get The Rage going and I wanted to make it in Ohio with as many Ohioans as I could. I had some of their (Midnight Syndicate) CDs, that I had picked up at conventions. Someone told me that Ed (Douglas) and his partner lived in Cleveland. I called them up and asked them if they wanted to be involved with our independent movie. That is really how the relationship started. At that point, Midnight Syndicate had a well-established reputation in the Halloween/horror music, haunted attraction, and gaming industries having released eight albums that featured a blending of instrumental symphonic music and soundscape. Daniel Hinds of Outburn Music Magazine said that, given their previous work, it made "perfect sense" for them to "feel right at home" scoring movie soundtracks. The album was released and distributed through Entity Productions, one of the largest distributor of Halloween music CDs at the time.

== Reception ==
Dread Central praised the soundtrack calling it "a rare piece of music where the sound defines the picture" noting homages to Brad Fiedel's Terminator soundtrack and Goblin's Dawn of the Dead (1978). Daniel Hinds of Outburn called the soundtrack "surprisingly well rounded" and "larger than life" adding that while, because the pacing and arrangement of the album were tied to the film, it "might not be as satisfying as a spin of one of Midnight Syndicate's independent albums," it still made for a "gripping" listen that should "fit nicely next to your John Carpenter soundtracks."

== Track listing ==
No.	Title	Length
1.	"Theme from The Rage"	2:55
2.	"Injecting the Formula"	4:11
3.	"In the Forest Deep"	2:51
4.	"Dr. V's Lab"	3:04
5.	"Feeding Time"	1:32
6.	"Don't Go in There"	2:57
7.	"Uncle Ben Montage"	0:57
8.	"Crash Aftermath"	1:11
9.	"Uncle Ben Under the Winnebago"	1:52
10.	"The Waterfall"	2:14
11.	"Birds of Prey"	3:15
12.	"Meet Dr. V"	4:00
13.	"Kiss the Monkey"	3:19
14.	"Dr. V's Theme"	4:21
15.	"Surrounded"	1:47
16.	"Breakthrough"	3:18
17.	"Showdown in the Lab"	2:12
18.	"Gor"	2:46
19.	"Final Confrontation with Dr. V"	4:45

== Personnel ==
- Edward Douglas – composer

== Production ==
- Producer – Edward Douglas
- Album producers – Midnight Syndicate
- Mastering – Gavin Goszka
- Design – Brainstorm Studios
- Photography – Precinct 13 Entertainment
