= The Brimstone Club =

Studio album by Midnight Syndicate
- Released: August 18, 2023
- Recorded: 2023
- Studio: Apothecary Nine; The Dungeon
- Genre: Gothic, classical crossover, dark ambient, neoclassical dark wave, darkwave
- Length: 34:43
- Label: Entity Productions
- Producer: Edward Douglas; Gavin Goszka

Midnight Syndicate chronology
Bloodlines (2021)	The Brimstone Club (2023)

The Brimstone Club is the fifteenth studio album by Midnight Syndicate, released August 18, 2023. With a "shadowy theatre" theme inspired by the Parisian Cabaret de L'Enfer, the album blends orchestral music and sound effects to create a "soundtrack to an imaginary film" in a style similar to the band's other releases.

== Background and album information ==
In an August 2023 interview with WKYC, composer Edward Douglas mentioned that the album was inspired by pictures and stories of the hell-themed Parisian Cabaret de L'Enfer which he described as the first themed restaurant and a forerunner to the modern day haunted attraction. He added that there was "just enough" information about the club to "get the imagination going" but it was what was not known about the club that really served as much of the further inspiration.

== Release ==
The Brimstone Club was released and distributed by Entity Productions, debuting at #2 on Billboard's Classical Crossover charts on September 2, 2023. The album's packaging included a paper ticket to the imaginary club. French artist, Pascal Casolari created the album artwork.

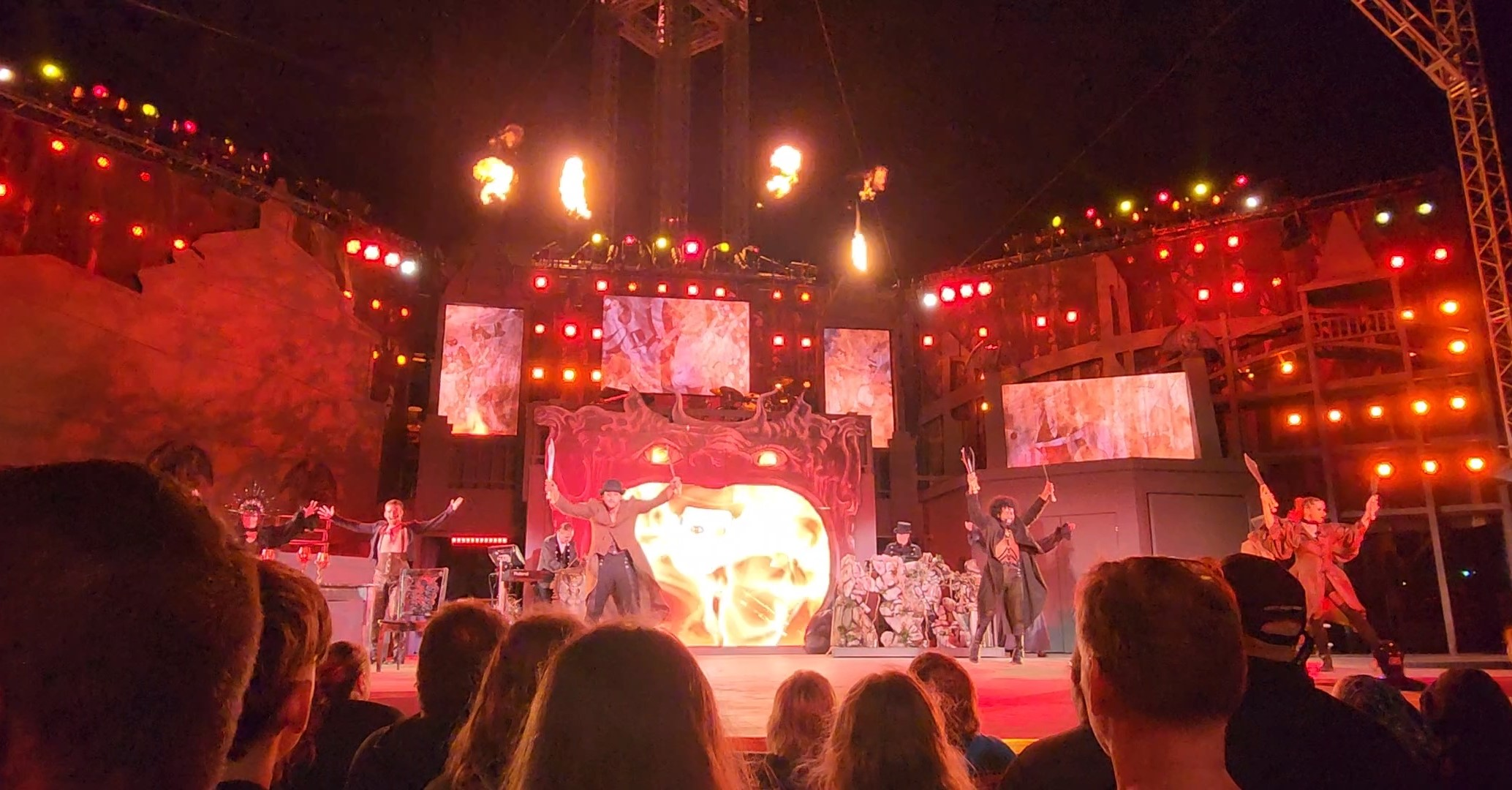
Midnight Syndicate performing in "Echoes from the Brimstone Club" at Cedar Point in 2023

In support of the album, the band produced a show with the Ohio amusement park, Cedar Point called Echoes of the Brimstone Club. The show began its run at the park's HalloWeekends event on September 15, 2023. With set design inspired by the album's cover art, the show featured music from the album, various cirque-type specialty acts, and pyrotechnics.

== Reception ==
Sue Granquist of Black Gate Magazine called the album her favorite album from the band adding that the music made it easy imagine "Parisians at the small cabaret tables, some in bowler hats to hide their horns and others with dark glasses to mask their black, iris-less eyes." Jeff Szpirglas of Rue Morgue Magazine mentioned that while "the sixteen tracks moved swiftly over the albums brief 33 minutes," there was fun to be had piecing together the environment through the cues and their titles adding that the album made good use of the band's talents given their aptitude for scoring theme park horror events.

== Track listing ==
No.	Title	Writer(s)	Length
1.	"The Brimstone Club"	Edward Douglas	3:25
2.	"Fellowship of the House"	Gavin Goszka	2:23
3.	"Saturnalia"	Gavin Goszka	3:07
4.	"Vodou"	Edward Douglas	1:14
5.	"Glamoury"	Gavin Goszka	3:09
6.	"Fortune's Folly"	Gavin Goszka	2:40
7.	"Amber & Oak"	Gavin Goszka	2:18
8.	"The Incomparable Mr. Jingles"	Edward Douglas	1:29
9.	"Behind the Curtain"	Edward Douglas	2:29
10.	"Ghost Light"	Edward Douglas	1:39
11.	"Green Room"	Edward Douglas	2:05
12.	"Lacricia"	Edward Douglas	1:18
13.	"Descending"	Edward Douglas	2:38
14.	"Ritual"	Edward Douglas	1:09
15.	"Underbelly"	Gavin Goszka	2:04
16.	"The Chosen"	Edward Douglas	1:22

== Personnel ==
- Edward Douglas – composer
- Gavin Goszka – composer

== Production ==
- Producer – Edward Douglas, Gavin Goszka
- Mastering – Gavin Goszka
- Cover art – Pascal Casolari
- Graphic design – Brainstorm Design Group
