= Live Shadows =

Live album by Midnight Syndicate
- Released: June 11, 2021
- Recorded: October 2014 – October 2019
- Venue: Cedar Point, Sandusky, Ohio, USA
- Length: 33:22
- Label: Entity Productions
- Producer: Edward Douglas; Gavin Goszka

Midnight Syndicate chronology
Music of Halloween Horror Nights (2020)	Live Shadows (2021)	Bloodlines (2021)

Live Shadows is the first live album by Midnight Syndicate. Released on June 11, 2021, it features performances from the band's multimedia Midnight Syndicate Live! shows recorded from 2014 through 2019 at Cedar Point in Sandusky, Ohio during their annual HalloWeekends event.

== Background and album information ==
In September 2014, seventeen years into their career, Midnight Syndicate began producing their first live concerts. These first shows were performed at Cedar Point's HalloWeekends event under the moniker, Midnight Syndicate Live! and featured a mix of film, special effects using fog and lasers, and live renditions of music from Midnight Syndicate's albums. At the time, Craig Webb of the Akron Beacon Journal described it as "Part concert, part movie, part theater, part just plain creepy," going on to call it "top-notch and ambitious." The band would return to Cedar Point's HalloWeekends with new productions of their Midnight Syndicate Live! show in 2017, 2018, and 2019.

In a May 2021 interview with Rue Morgue Magazine, the band said that the idea for Live Shadows, came from a desire to share their live performance experience with fans who could not attend the shows in person. They added that the timing of the release had a lot to do with the coronavirus pandemic cancelling of their live show plans for 2020 and the fact that many people were currently unable to experience live music in person.

The songs on the album come from recordings of Midnight Syndicate Live! shows from 2014 through 2019. Many of the selections are new arrangements of songs from Midnight Syndicate albums although some of the selections are new, previously unreleased songs that were written specifically for particular Midnight Syndicate Live! shows.

== Release ==
On June 11, 2021, Live Shadows was digitally released on CD with an accompanying limited-edition purple vinyl. The band produced four music videos in support of the album: Creatures of Darkness, Alchemist's Chamber, Nightstalker, and Into the Valley of Shadows. Each music video represents one of the four shows featured on the album.

== Reception ==
William J. Wright of Rue Morgue Magazine called the album an "aural onslaught of their concert performances with surprises for even the most dedicated fans." While calling the album's content "compelling", Games Gazette writer Chris Baylis lamented the fact that the music video offerings did not feature a complete Midnight Syndicate concert. Writer Lino Endorphino commented that the lack of audience noise in between every track made it different from a typical rock music live album. He asked the band if it was intentional in an interview with them for the German-based horror magazine, Virus. Album co-producer Edward Douglas replied that they "wanted the same loss of reality to occur while listening (to Live Shadows) that happens (while listening to) their studio albums."

== Track listing ==
No.	Title	Writer(s)	Vocals	Length
1.	"The Stage Is Set"	Edward Douglas		1:00
2.	"Alchemist's Chamber" (Live)	Edward Douglas		2:52
3.	"Sigil" (Live)	Gavin Goszka		0:59
4.	"Twilight" (Live)	Gavin Goszka	Janina Bradshaw	2:08
5.	"Creatures of Darkness" (Live)	Gavin Goszka	Amber Foth	4:00
6.	"Noctem Aeternus" (Live)	Edward Douglas	Emily Viancourt	2:34
7.	"Haunted Nursery" (Live)	Edward Douglas	Janina Bradshaw	1:19
8.	"Gatekeeper"	Edward Douglas		1:25
9.	"Into the Valley of Shadows" (Live)	Gavin Goszka		2:37
10.	"Kiddieland" (Live)	Edward Douglas	Daniel Prillaman	2:26
11.	"Nightstalker" (Live)	Edward Douglas	Janina Bradshaw	3:01
12.	"Grisly Reminder" (Live)	Gavin Goszka		1:56
13.	"Twisted Labyrinth" (Live)	Gavin Goszka		1:01
14.	"Haverghast Asylum" (Live)	Edward Douglas	Ashley Watkins	3:01
15.	"Conspiracy of Shadows" (Live)	Edward Douglas		2:03

== Personnel ==
- Edward Douglas – composer
- Gavin Goszka – composer

== Production ==
- Producer – Edward Douglas
- Producer – Gavin Goszka
- Mastering – Gavin Goszka
- Sound – Cedar Point Live Entertainment
- Graphic design – Brainstorm Design Group
- Lighting – Matt Weber
- Photography – Rex B. Hamilton, Steven Franczek, Rebecca Nowak, Jordan Sternberg, Joe Kleon, Shawn Marie Stitak, Martin Smoley, Rick Davis, Kristen Lindsey
- Videography – Andrew Smoley, Martin Smoley, Mark Rakocy, Gary Jones
