= Halloween Adventure =

American retail store chain

Halloween Adventure Stores (also known as Masquerade, LLC) is a retail store chain specializing in Halloween-related merchandise, they are one of the world's largest costuming companies and arguably the largest chain store specializing in Halloween in the United States. The company was founded in 1981 by brothers Bruce and Darron Goldman in Philadelphia, Pennsylvania and has locations in Pennsylvania, New York, New Jersey, Delaware, Maryland, Florida, and California. In 2006 there were over 120 "seasonal stores", using temporary locations in shopping malls that were vacated for seasonal short-term rentals.

== Products ==
Halloween Adventure sells a variety of costumes, masks, makeup, props, hats and other accessories for adults and children. They also sell online as they found customers would browse in-store, then search online for the best pricing. Its main competition for this group is Halloween Thrills.

The company also owns five permanent stores: Masquerade in Philadelphia and Pittsburgh, Pennsylvania, New York Costumes and Gothic Renaissance in New York City and a self-named store in Canoga Park, California. In 1994 the company estimated gross revenues at $10 million.

The company has branched out into other retailing areas, mostly in the Christmas retailing season, converting Halloween Adventure temporary stores after October 31 into one of three different shops: Christmas Adventure, Smart Toys and/or Santa's Treasures. The company also runs Swingsets Direct, a company that specializes in children's (as well as municipal) playground equipment out of their former Halloween Adventure year-round store in Boothwyn, Pennsylvania. In addition, Masquerade Inc. has recently introduced a concept store called Bliss Avenue, which sells sexy costumes and lingerie.
