= Midnight Syndicate =

American musical duo

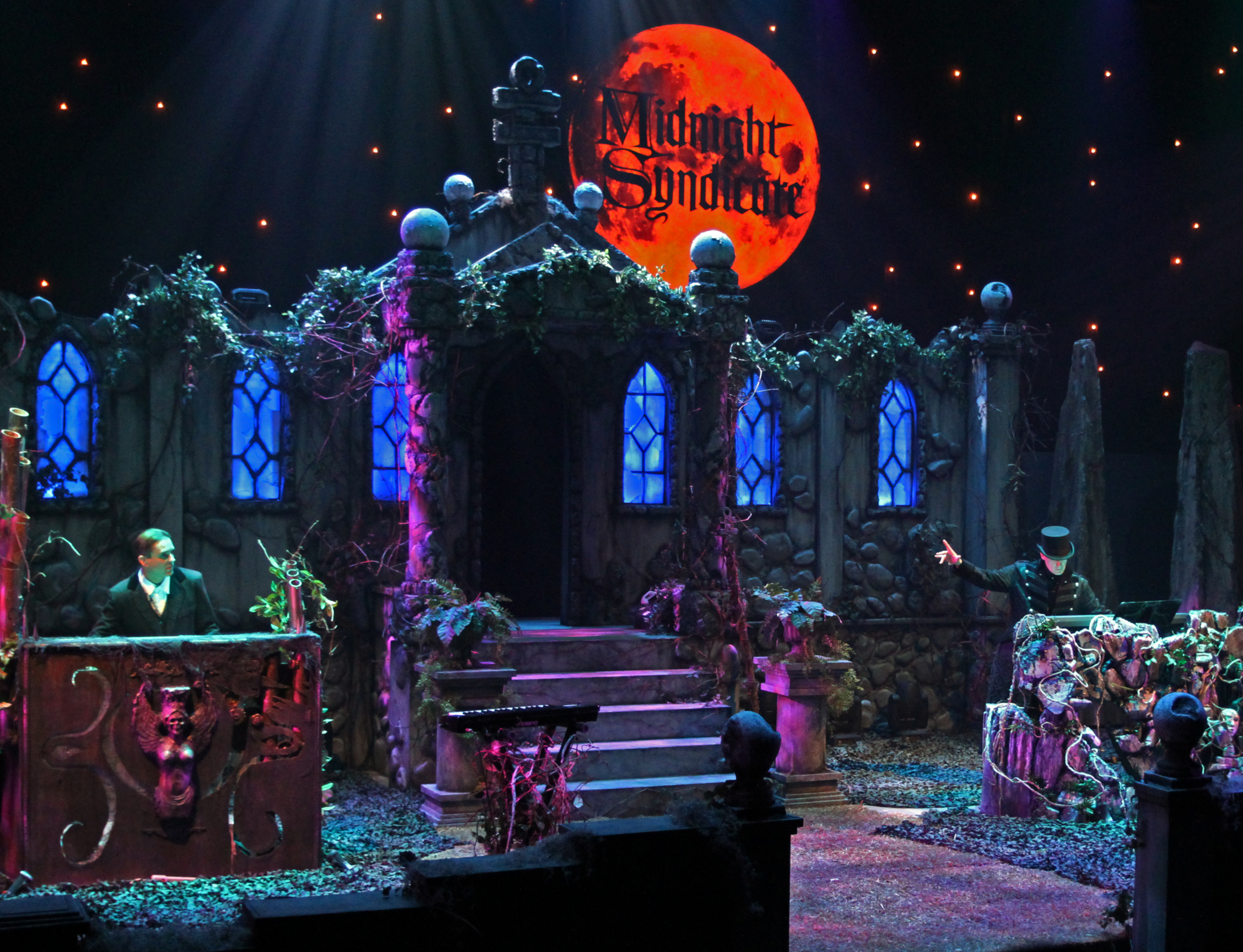
- Midnight Syndicate performing in 2014 at Cedar Point, Sandusky, Ohio

Background information
- Origin: Chardon, Ohio, US
- Genres: Neoclassical dark wave; dungeon synth; dark ambient; classical crossover
- Years active: 1997–present
- Labels: Entity Productions (1997–present); Monolith Graphics (1998)
- Members: Edward Douglas; Gavin Goszka
- Past members: Scott Angus (1997); Mark Rakocy (1997); Dennis Carleton (1997); Jamie Barbour (1997); Ray Portler (1997); Christopher Robichaud (1997); Joseph Vargo (1998–2000)
- Website: www.midnightsyndicate.com

Midnight Syndicate is an American musical duo that has been working primarily in the genre of neoclassical dark wave music since 1997 and is based in Chardon, Ohio, a suburb of Cleveland.

The band refers to their CDs as "soundtracks for the imagination" or "soundtracks to imaginary films". Their songs are characterized by a blend of instrumental music and sound effects and are commonly used to provide atmosphere during the Halloween season, in haunted attractions, amusement parks, and in the role-playing game industry.

== History ==
=== Formation and early years (1996–1998) ===
Composer/filmmaker Edward Douglas formed Midnight Syndicate in 1996 shortly after releasing a micro-budget, direct-to-video horror film called The Dead Matter (1996) which he directed and scored and would later remake in 2010. Midnight Syndicate's self-titled debut album was released the following year. A majority of music on the album was written, arranged, and performed by Edward Douglas. Contributors included Scott Angus, Mark Rakocy, Dennis Carleton, Jamie Barbour, Ray Portler, the rap act Dark Side, and Christopher Robichaud. Douglas coined the term cine-fusion to describe the album. Cine-fusion is described in the album's liner notes as

"a blending of movie soundtrack music and pop music ... a compilation of soundtracks to movies that do not exist. The goal of the music is to stimulate the imaginations of listeners so that they are able to transport themselves to worlds or movies of their own creation."

Musically, the album contained an eclectic blend of styles including everything from dark instrumental music (of which three tracks appeared on future releases), rock, rock-a-billy, techno, rap, new-age, comedy music, jazz, and space. Movie-style sound effects were employed in some tracks. In March 1998, a multimedia show was produced by Douglas and his company, Entity Productions, to support the album. The show included a blending of original short films, live music, animation, and stage performers.

=== Breakout (1998–2000) ===
In 1998, Douglas teamed up with gothic fantasy artist Joseph Vargo, and the two decided to create an exclusively dark-themed instrumental Midnight Syndicate album, the result of Joseph Vargo's desire to produce an album that people could play in the background of their Halloween parties. Vargo developed the storyline and concept of a musical journey through a haunted castle, with the music reflecting his gothic artwork, in addition to being integral to many of the creative decisions on the album.

Composer Gavin Goszka, formerly a solo artist in a project called Lore, also joined Douglas and Vargo in the new Midnight Syndicate line-up. Together, they created Born of the Night, a groundbreaking album that appealed to fans of gothic music, the horror genre, and haunted attractions. Douglas and Goszka wrote and performed the music on the album while Vargo served as executive producer and creative director of the project, as well as writing and performing the vocals and narrations, and designing the cover art and packaging. The album and songs were also titled after several of Vargo's most popular paintings. Born of the Night was independently released in September 1998 through Vargo's Monolith Graphics and Douglas' Entity Productions, hitting the horror market just in time for the Halloween season. It was Midnight Syndicate's first critically acclaimed gothic-horror soundtrack and proved to be an instant success, establishing Midnight Syndicate's trademark sound.

In March 2000, Realm of Shadows followed suit with the same flavor of dark instrumental music and another gothic setting illustrated by Joseph Vargo. Douglas and Goszka wrote all of the music for this album while Vargo wrote and performed the opening narration and theme story. Again, the songs were titled after Vargo's artworks. Both albums were featured as official soundtracks for Universal Studios' Halloween Horror Nights, and used in several other major theme parks during Halloween, such as Busch Gardens, Cedar Point, Kennywood Park, and Thorpe Park's Fright Nights event. The heavy metal band King Diamond also featured tracks from Born of the Night and Realm of Shadows as opening music for their 2000 US tour. Afterwards, Vargo and Midnight Syndicate chose to work separately of one another on future projects.

=== Rise (2001–2006) ===
Midnight Syndicate's third gothic horror soundtrack, Gates of Delirium, was released in 2001. This time Douglas and Goszka teamed up with two members who worked on the first Midnight Syndicate CD, Mark Rakocy (graphic design) and Christopher Robichaud (vocals). Set in a Victorian haunted mental institution called Haverghast Asylum, Gates of Delirium was the first Midnight Syndicate disc to feature the fictitious Haverghast family, a theme the band would revisit on future discs such as The 13th Hour and Bloodlines. Gavin Goszka has since called Gates of Delirium "a personal favorite" from the Midnight Syndicate library.

During the 2001 Halloween weekend, six of the band's mp3 singles were in the Top 20 for all of MP3.com (#1, No. 2, No. 7, No. 10, No. 12, and No. 19) registering over 100,000 listens in three days. The title track from Born of the Night remained at No. 1 for over a week with two tracks from Gates of Delirium maintaining their positions in the Top 40 as well.

In August 2002, the band released their fifth studio album Vampyre. The vampire-themed disc was the first Midnight Syndicate disc to feature a cover designed by fantasy artist Keith Parkinson.

By this time, the band's popularity with role-playing gamers who used their discs as background for their sessions had grown to where they were exhibiting at gaming conventions. It was at one of these conventions that the band was approached by designers from Wizards of the Coast. The result was the 2003 release Dungeons & Dragons: Official Role-playing Soundtrack, the first officially licensed soundtrack to the classic roleplaying game Dungeons & Dragons. The album (whose fantasy themes were a departure from previous releases) was generally well received by music critics and the gaming community and helped the band build their following in Europe. Some of the tracks were later used in computer games Baldur's Gate - Dark Alliance II and Shadowbane expansions Rise of Chaos and Throne of Oblivion.

In August 2005, the band released The 13th Hour. Featuring vocal effects by Lily Lane of the horror-rock band Lazy Lane and cover art by Keith Parkinson the disc is set in a haunted Victorian mansion. The album would become one of their most popular titles, winning awards in the gaming industry, and eventually inspiring Bloodlines in 2021.

In March 2006, Midnight Syndicate announced that Born of the Night and Realm of Shadows were out of print. In July of that same year Out of the Darkness (Retrospective: 1994–1999) was released featuring re-recorded versions of tracks from the Midnight Syndicate (1997), Born of the Night (1998), and Realm of Shadows (2000) albums and tracks from Edward Douglas' early scores for his films Journey into Dementia (1994) and The Dead Matter (1996) and a previously unreleased track by Gavin entitled, Prisoner of Time. The album artwork was created by fantasy artist, Rob Alexander, who also created a number of works for Magic: the Gathering games. The track Into The Abyss was featured as the outtro of the final track of the Misfits 2013 live album, DEA.D ALIVE! In 2015, the album was included in Rue Morgue Magazine's 50 Essential Horror Albums - Discs That Created, Evolved, or Defined Genre Music Through the Decades.

=== Film soundtracks (2007–2010) ===
In early 2007, the band temporarily shifted from creating "soundtracks to imaginary films" to composing music for actual projects when they completed the score to Robert Kurtzman's, The Rage and wrote music for Universal Orlando's Halloween Horror Nights 17's Carnival of Carnage. The Rage: Original Motion Picture Soundtrack was released in February 2008.

In September 2007, Douglas returned to filmmaking as director, co-producer, and composer of an updated remake of his 1995 horror film, The Dead Matter. The remake stars Andrew Divoff, Tom Savini, and Jason Carter, and was co-produced by Kurtzman. During this time, Gavin Goszka started a solo project called Parlormuse which featured Victorian era songs re-recorded in a modern folk rock style.

In August 2008, the band released The Dead Matter: Cemetery Gates, a CD of music inspired by the themes from The Dead Matter movie. Midnight Syndicate's first two music videos were made for the songs Dark Legacy and Lost from the disc. In the finale of the music video for Dark Legacy, Edward Douglas and Gavin Goszka are shown playing on stage at the historic Phantasy Theater in Cleveland, Ohio. It marked the first time they had played together live.

On July 30, 2010 The Dead Matter movie was released on DVD along with a Midnight Syndicate compilation CD called Halloween Music Collection and an EP entitled The Dark Masquerade featuring gothic artist Destini Beard performing operatic vocals and lyrics to various Midnight Syndicate recordings. The Dead Matter: Original Motion Picture Soundtrack was also released on July 30. The CD featured the score by Edward Douglas, other music that appeared in the film, and several remixes of Midnight Syndicate tracks by other artists.

=== Studio albums, collaborations and live shows (2011–2019) ===
In August 2011, the band released its fourteenth studio album, entitled Carnival Arcane. The theme of the CD surrounds a fictional turn of the century traveling circus called The Lancaster Rigby Carnival. The CD was inspired by research into carnivals of that time period and Ray Bradbury's Something Wicked This Way Comes. In 2012, the album won the Best CD category in the 2012 Rondo Hatton Classic Horror Awards.

In August 2012 Destini Beard released the followup to her 2010 EP, The Dark Masquerade. The full-length CD once again featured Destini's original vocals and lyrics blended with previously recorded Midnight Syndicate tracks. The disc featured a remix by Pat Berdysz of the Electro-industrial band Encoder and an original song written and performed entirely by Destini entitled, My Last Goodbye. The CD is set in a haunted Victorian hotel and features cover art by Destini's father, fantasy artist, Ed Beard Jr. In February 2013, the band's song Into The Abyss from their Out of the Darkness CD was featured as an outtro on the Misfits live album, DEA.D Alive.

In 2013, the band scored the horror creature feature film, Axe Giant: The Revenge of Paul Bunyan. The film is a dark contemporary take on the legend of Paul Bunyan and premiered on the Syfy Channel in June 2013. In July 2013 the band released a new studio album entitled Monsters of Legend. Featuring images from Bride of Frankenstein and Werewolf of London on the cover, the album was influenced by classic Universal Monsters, Hammer Films, Amicus Productions, and Euro Horror films from the 60's and 70's as well as composers like James Bernard, Bernard Herrmann, and Max Steiner. The album won the Best CD category in the 2014 Rondo Hatton Classic Horror Awards.

In March 2014, the band announced plans for a series of live multimedia concerts entitled Midnight Syndicate Live! Legacy of Shadows that would run at the amusement park Cedar Point's HalloWeekends event beginning in September 2014. They also announced that they would be teaming up with special effects artist, Robert Kurtzman who worked on The Dead Matter as well as director Gary Jones and Face Off contestants, Beki Ingram and David Greathouse. The show opened on September 12 to very positive reviews. The Akron Beacon Journal described it as "Part concert, part movie, part theater, part just plain creepy," going on to call it "top-notch and ambitious."

In September 2015, the band released, a "Yuletide-inspired" album entitled, Christmas: A Ghostly Gathering. Billed as "the band’s unique twist on classic Christmas carols blended with new and original material," the album was seen as an effort to take the band's Halloween-associated sound and apply it to a Christmas theme. In a November 2016 interview, Edward Douglas called it "one of my favorite albums Midnight Syndicate has ever done."

In April 2016, the band announced that it was teaming up with tabletop game designers, Twilight Creations, to create a soundtrack for that company's award-winning zombie apocalypse-themed board game Zombies!!!. The Zombies!!! Official Board Game Soundtrack was released in September of that year. The album was praised for its effectiveness for use with the game as well as its appropriateness for use as background music during the Halloween season.

In September 2017, the band returned to Cedar Point with a new production of their Midnight Syndicate Live! show. Staged inside the Jack Aldrich Theater, the show once again ran as a part of the amusement park's HalloWeekends event. They followed it up in 2018 with a new show entitled Midnight Syndicate: Conspiracy of Shadows which WBLZ Media's Daniel James called the band's "most ambitious project to date" and "one of the best stage shows in the country." In the band's blog, Gavin Goszka mentioned that the 2018 show marked the conclusion of a loose trilogy that consisted of the band's first three productions at Cedar Point.

In March 2019, the band announced that they would be returning to Cedar Point for a third consecutive year. Gavin stated that the new show would be "taking things in a new direction," with Edward Douglas adding that he felt it was something that would appeal to fans of Twilight Zone.

=== Recent projects (2020–present) ===
In 2020, plans for a fourth consecutive Midnight Syndicate Live! show at Cedar Point were canceled due to the coronavirus pandemic. In August, a limited-edition album, entitled Music of Halloween Horror Nights was made available at the Universal Studios Florida Halloween Horror Nights Tribute Store. The album featured songs created by Midnight Syndicate specifically for Universal's Halloween Horror Nights in addition to other tracks that had been used at the event and on the event's websites since 1999. 500 hand-numbered copies were made available on red vinyl. Music of Halloween Horror Nights sold out in less than three hours.

Midnight Syndicate released its first live album in June 2021. Entitled Live Shadows, the album consisted of new material and newly arranged live versions of music from throughout the band's career. Recorded at Midnight Syndicate Live! shows from 2014 through 2019, the album was released along with music videos that showcased the productions the group had performed at Cedar Point's HalloWeekends to date.

In August 2021, Midnight Syndicate released its fourteenth studio album, Bloodlines, which debuted at #12 on Billboard's Classical Crossover charts. Created as a prequel to the 2005 release The 13th Hour, the album's last track, Sands of Time, is meant to segue directly into the first track of The 13th Hour. Bloodlines expanded upon the backstory of the Haverghast family that was established on both the Gates of Delirium and The 13th Hour albums.

In September 2021, Universal Studios Florida reissued 2020's Music of Halloween Horror Nights album on limited-edition orange vinyl featuring new artwork and four additional tracks on the digital download version. Once again, the album sold out within days of its release. A third limited-edition vinyl pressing of Music of Halloween Horror Nights was released on October 5. This picture disc version featured the iconic Halloween Horror Nights character, Jack the Clown, on the cover and included a slightly different lineup of songs. Edward Douglas and Gavin Goszka commemorated this particular reissue with a signing at Universal Studios Florida which also included the albums' cover artists, Jose Pardo and Luis Orazi. That September also marked the return of the band to Cedar Point's HalloWeekends event where they staged a remount of their 2018 Midnight Syndicate: Conspiracy of Shadows multimedia performances.

To celebrate their 25th Anniversary in 2022, the band relaunched its Legions of the Night fan community featuring a fan-generated "best of" compilation entitled Legions of the Night Volume 1. In August, Universal Orlando and Midnight Syndicate teamed up again to release another limited-edition vinyl album. The new album, entitled Legendary Truth: The Collective, featured packaging that referenced elements from Halloween Horror Night's past including: previous icons, Legions of Horror, and the in-park experience, Legendary Truth: The Collective. Additionally, in 2022, the band commemorated its 25-year association with Cedar Point's HalloWeekends by producing and performing a new show entitled, Midnight Hour: 25 Years of HalloWeekends and Midnight Syndicate. A compilation album entitled, HalloWeekends: 25 Years of Terror Together was released and sold in the park. The new album featured songs that had been heavily used at the park over the previous 25 years as well as new music from the Midnight Hour show.

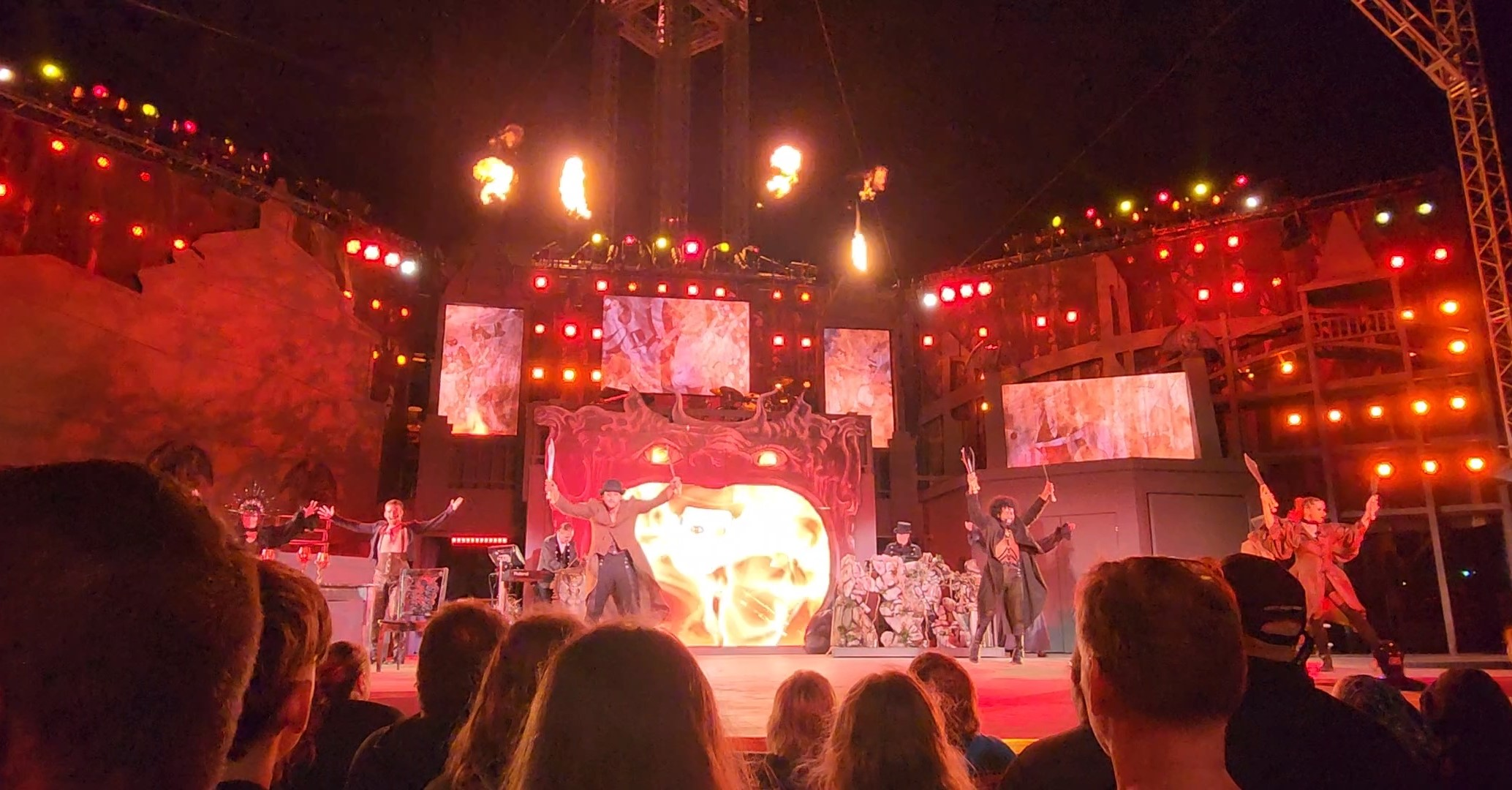
Midnight Syndicate performing in "Echoes from the Brimstone Club" at Cedar Point in 2023

In August 2023, the band released its fifteenth studio album, The Brimstone Club. The album's "shadowy theatre" theme was inspired by the Parisian Cabaret de L'Enfer, a 19th-century hell-themed cabaret that band member Edward Douglas described as the first themed restaurant and forerunner to the modern day haunted attraction. The album debuted at #2 on Billboard's Classical Crossover charts on September 2, 2023. In support of the album, the band produced an outdoor live show with Cedar Point's HalloWeekends entitled Echoes from the Brimstone Club which incorporated music from the album, with live actors and pyrotechnics.

In August 2025, it was announced that Midnight Syndicate had written the original soundtrack for Universal Destinations & Experiences' first year-round horror experience, Universal Horror Unleashed, located in Las Vegas. Although Midnight Syndicate's music had been a part of the haunted attraction industry since the late-90s, this project marked the band's first custom score to an attraction. A month later, on September 26th, they released an EP of rare and previously unreleased material entitled Darkened Corners. Darkened Corners featured music from the previous twenty years that the band had written for various projects including live shows, amusement parks, and films that had not yet been completed. It also included a remix of the track Sleep from The Dead Matter: Original Motion Picture Soundtrack. It was this time that the band announced that development on their next full-length album had been "underway for a while" and was expected to be released in 2026.

On August 21, 2026, Midnight Syndicate released their sixteenth studio album, Plankett's Grove. Inspired by folk horror, the 18-track album explores the secrets of a forest surrounding the secluded fictional town of Illswich, marking an aesthetic shift from the European cabaret setting of The Brimstone Club.

=== Influences ===
Douglas cites film composers Danny Elfman, James Horner, John Carpenter, Hans Zimmer, heavy metal acts King Diamond and Black Sabbath, radio dramas, and horror film scores and Hammer Film Productions, as primary musical influences for Midnight Syndicate. He cites gothic artist Joseph Vargo, whose input Douglas credits as critical on the Born of the Night CD and the designs of Alchemy Gothic, and Keith Parkinson. Douglas credits the books of Stephen King, Tales From the Crypt comics, and Role-playing games as sources of inspiration. In a 2010 interview, Goszka cited similar musical influences such as Danny Elfman, John Carpenter, King Diamond, and Black Sabbath as well as Dead Can Dance.

== Distribution ==
When the band was unable to secure a record label or distributor after the release of Born of the Night and Realm of Shadows, Douglas decided to build their own distribution network. Through a combination of cold-calls, hand-delivering CDs to stores, and attending tradeshows, they eventually built a worldwide distribution network which included stores like Spirit Halloween, Spencer Gifts, and Hot Topic. Entity Productions also distributed the 2010 version of The Dead Matter movie.

=== Halloween retail and haunted attraction industry ===
The group's music is commonly used as atmosphere for Halloween-themed events, stores, and parties (including Hugh Hefner's), as well as home decorating for trick-or-treating. Heather Adler credits them as helping to legitimize the genre of Halloween music (music for the Halloween holiday), elevating standards in the genre, and inspiring other musicians to create similar projects. On September 11, 2009, AOL Radio released a list of the Top 10 Best Halloween Music CDs as ranked by AOL/CBS Radio listeners. Three of the ten CDs were Midnight Syndicate discs (Born of the Night No. 8, Realm of Shadows No. 4, and Vampyre No. 3), ranking behind Danny Elfman's The Nightmare Before Christmas and John Carpenter's Halloween soundtrack. In 2015, Rue Morgue Magazine cited Midnight Syndicate's "entrenchment" in the celebration of the Halloween season among their reasons for including Out of the Darkness (Retrospective: 1994–1999) among their 50 Essential Horror Albums - Discs That Created, Evolved, or Defined Genre Music Through the Decades.

In 2005, Leonard Pickel, editor of Haunted Attraction Magazine estimated that "75-90% of the attractions in the industry had at least one Midnight Syndicate CD." Their music is used by amusement parks such as Universal Orlando, Busch Gardens, Kings Island, Six Flags, Cedar Point, and Kennywood Park hold Halloween-themed events such as Thorpe Park Fright Nights, Halloween Horror Nights, HalloWeekends, Howl-O-Scream, and Fright Fest. In the liner notes to 2020's, Music of Halloween Horror Nights album, Vice President of Entertainment, Art and Design at Universal Orlando, T.J. Mannarino said, "It is difficult to overemphasize how much the music of Midnight Syndicate played in the historic success of Halloween Horror Nights." In 2020, Midnight Syndicate received a Lifetime Achievement Award from the haunted attraction website, City Blood.

=== Role-playing game industry ===
Midnight Syndicate has a significant following in the role-playing game community. Their Dungeons & Dragons CD broke previous sales records for gaming soundtracks in its first month. Their The 13th Hour CD won the Origins Award for Best Gaming Accessory presented by the Academy of Adventure Game Art & Design, marking the first time a role-playing soundtrack or music CD had won the award. The 13th Hour also became the first music CD to win an award at the ENnies, a fan-based annual award show for role-playing game publishers and products. In 2007, Midnight Syndicate teamed up with Goodman Games to produce Cages of Delirium a Dungeon Crawl Classics adventure based on Gates of Delirium which came packaged with the CD. The Cages of Delirium module was nominated for an ENnie Award as well as the band's Carnival Arcane album in 2012, their Monsters of Legend album in 2014, and their Zombies!!! Official Board Game Soundtrack in 2016.

== In popular culture ==
Midnight Syndicate's composer credits include the scores to the films The Rage, The Dead Matter, and Axe Giant. Their music has been featured in television programs such as Happy!, Barbara Walters' 10 Most Fascinating People of 2002, The Ellen DeGeneres Show, The Today Show, Monday Night Football, NBA on TNT, Syfy's The Possessed, and Travel Channel's haunted attraction-themed reality show, Making Monsters. The music has also been used as theme music in independent horror films like Dead & Rotting, Revamped, Witchouse 3: Demon Fire and Song of the Vampire (AKA Vampire Resurrection), and on the Dungeons & Dragons-based web series, Critical Role.

The music was used in the audio drama, The Byron Chronicles. Newer episodes of the Byron Chronicles are available at the creator's blog.

== Discography ==
=== Studio albums ===
- Midnight Syndicate (1997)
- Born of the Night (1998)
- Realm of Shadows (2000, 2016 reissue)
- Gates of Delirium (2001)
- Vampyre (2002)
- Dungeons & Dragons (2003)
- The 13th Hour (2005)
- The Dead Matter: Cemetery Gates (2008)
- Carnival Arcane (2011)
- Monsters of Legend (2013)
- Christmas: A Ghostly Gathering (2015)
- Bloodlines (2021)
- The Brimstone Club (2023)
- Plankett's Grove (2026)

=== Reissues ===
- Raven's Hollow: Realm of Shadows (2016)

=== Film soundtracks ===
- The Rage: Original Motion Picture Soundtrack (2008)
- The Dead Matter: Original Motion Picture Soundtrack (2010)
- Axe Giant: Original Motion Picture Soundtrack (2013)

=== Game soundtracks ===
- Zombies!!! Official Board Game Soundtrack (2016)

=== Compilation albums ===
- Out of the Darkness (Retrospective: 1994–1999) (2006)
- Halloween Music Collection (2010)
- Music of Halloween Horror Nights (2020)
- Legendary Truth: The Collective (2022)
- HalloWeekends: 25 Years of Terror Together (2022)
- Darkened Corners (2025)

=== Collaborative albums ===
- The Dark Masquerade with Destini Beard (2010)
- A Time Forgotten with Destini Beard (2012)

=== Live albums ===
- Live Shadows (2021)

=== Film ===
- The Dead Matter (2010)

== Associated with ==
- Destini Beard
- Parlormuse
