= The Watchman (newspaper) =

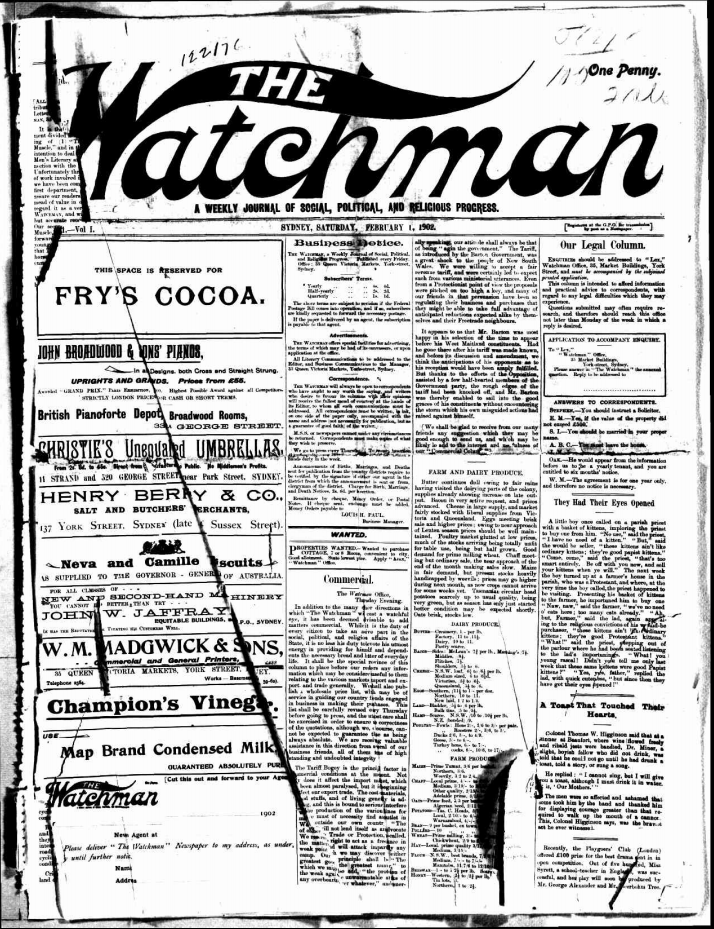
The Watchman, 1 February 1902

The Watchman was a weekly newspaper published in Sydney, New South Wales, Australia from 1902 until 1926.

== History ==
The Watchman was first published on 1 February 1902. It was edited until 1904 by William Marcus Dill Macky, the founder of the Australian Protestant Defence Association (APDA). The Watchman was intended to represent the interests of the APDA whose mission was to "preserve and defend the general interests of Protestantism against the encroachments of Rome in matters religious, political, social and commercial".

The Watchman was inspired by a pamphlet of the same name which had been published by the Pitt Street Congregational Church in Sydney from 1895 until 1902.

== Digitisation ==
The paper has been digitised as part of the Australian Newspapers Digitisation Program project of the National Library of Australia.

== See also ==
- List of newspapers in Australia
- List of newspapers in New South Wales
