= Carnival Arcane =

Studio album by Midnight Syndicate
- Released: August 2, 2011
- Genre: Dark cabaret; neoclassical dark wave
- Label: Entity Productions
- Producer: Edward Douglas, Gavin Goszka

Midnight Syndicate chronology
Halloween Music Collection (2010)	Carnival Arcane (2011)	A Time Forgotten with Destini Beard (2012)

Carnival Arcane is the 14th album by neoclassical dark wave band Midnight Syndicate, released in 2011. Featuring the blend of dark, orchestral, instrumental music and horror-inspired soundscape the band had become known for, the "dark carnival" theme of the album centers on a fictional, early-20th century traveling circus called The Lancaster Rigby Carnival.

== Background and album information ==
Carnival Arcane was inspired by research into carnivals of the early 20th century and Ray Bradbury's Something Wicked This Way Comes. In a 2011 interview with FEARnet, composer, Edward Douglas said:

We've definitely put together something different for us (Midnight Syndicate), but we still maintain our identity. More than ever, we really focused on using sound effects and design to pull you into the world of the disc. The music is still the focus, absolutely, but there are many times that it feels like an 'imaginary film' more than anything we've done to this point."

The album featured voice acting performances by actors, Jason Carter, Dennis Carter, Jr., and Brian Van Camp, all who had appeared in the band's previous project, The Dead Matter (2010) horror film.

== Reception ==
Fangoria, Dread Central, FEARnet, and Outburn Magazine all praised the band's execution of their "cinema of the mind" concept through the use of instrumental music and sound design. Mike Beardsall of Rue Morgue complimented the album's "immersive" qualities, adding that "coulrophobics, however, should probably skip this ride." In 2012, the album won the Best Horror CD category in the 10th annual Rondo Hatton Classic Horror Awards. The album was also nominated for Best RPG Related Product in the 2012 ENnie Awards in the role-playing game industry.

== Track listing ==
No.	Title	Writer(s)	Length
1.	"Mesonoxian Visitors"	Edward Douglas	3:27
2.	"Midway"	Edward Douglas	1:03
3.	"Welcome to the Carnival"	Gavin Goszka	3:32
4.	"Canvas Wonderland"	Gavin Goszka	3:12
5.	"Midway Reprise"	Edward Douglas	0:24
6.	"A Strange Menagerie"	Gavin Goszka	2:45
7.	"Madame Zora"	Edward Douglas	0:37
8.	"Agent of Fortune"	Edward Douglas	3:10
9.	"Dr. Atmore's Elixirs of Good Humour and Fortification"	Gavin Goszka	3:09
10.	"Alura the Snake Lady"	Edward Douglas	3:16
11.	"Arcane Wonders"	Gavin Goszka	2:39
12.	"Under the Big Top"	Gavin Goszka	4:34
13.	"Freakshow"	Edward Douglas	4:56
14.	"Pulling the Strings"	Gavin Goszka	3:17
15.	"Carousel Ride"	Edward Douglas	1:50
16.	"Revelation"	Edward Douglas	1:19
17.	"Goons and Greasepaint"	Edward Douglas	3:03
18.	"Kiddieland"	Edward Douglas	1:51
19.	"Krellsig's Kastle of Fun"	Edward Douglas	1:19
20.	"Diversions in the Dark"	Edward Douglas	1:44
21.	"Twisted Labyrinth"	Gavin Goszka	1:20
22.	"Cheval Glass"	Gavin Goszka	1:19
23.	"Sea of Laughter"	Edward Douglas	1:25
24.	"Lights Out"	Gavin Goszka	2:42
25.	"Epilogue"	Gavin Goszka	1:30
26.	"Crum Car" (Bonus track – performed by International Novelty Orchestra with effects and overdubs by Midnight Syndicate)	M. Earl	1:21

== Personnel ==
- Edward Douglas – composer
- Gavin Goszka – composer
- Jason Carter – voice actor – Ringmaster, Montgomery Lancaster
- Dennis Carter, Jr. – voice actor – Laughing Denny
- Amber Foth – vocals on Kiddieland
- Brian Van Camp – voice actor
- Todd Malkus – voice actor
- Keith Martin – voice actor
- Mary Kate Douglas – voice actor
- Sarah Douglas – voice actor

== Production ==
- Producers – Edward Douglas, Gavin Goszka
- Mastering – Gavin Goszka
- Cover art and Design – Brainstorm Design Group
- Band Photography – Anthony Gray
- Additional Photography – Wisconsin Historical Society, Darkride and Funhouse Enthusiasts (DAFE)
