= Border Group =

Geologic formation in Great Britain

- Stratigraphic range: Chadian to Holkerian substages of Carboniferous
- Type: Group
- Sub-units: Lyne and Fell Sandstone formations, Kershopefoot Basalt Beds
- Underlies: Yoredale Group
- Overlies: Inverclyde Group
- Thickness: more than 1350m

Lithology
- Primary: sandstones
- Other: siltstone, limestone, dolomite, conglomerate, basalt

Location
- Country: Scotland, England
- Extent: Northumberland and Solway basins

Type section
- Named for: Scottish Borders

The Border Group is a Carboniferous lithostratigraphic group (a sequence of rock strata) in southern Scotland and northernmost England. The name is derived from the Scottish Borders region. The rocks of the Border Group have also previously been referred to as the Lower, Middle and Upper Border groups.
