= Gothic Beauty =

American magazine

- Editor-in-Chief: Steven Holiday
- Frequency: Quarterly
- Circulation: 14,000
- Publisher: Steven Holiday
- First issue: October 2000
- Country: US
- Based in: Portland, Oregon
- Language: English
- Website: www.gothicbeauty.com
- ISSN: 1533-841X

Gothic Beauty is an American magazine established by editor Steven Holiday in the fall of 2000 after the success of the Internet social group of the same name. Gothic Beauty covers numerous aspects of underground culture including fashion, music, events and various forms of entertainment. Issues have included interviews with such Goth and Goth-friendly musicians as Alice Cooper, Diamanda Galás, KMFDM, Rasputina, Midnight Syndicate and Peter Murphy. Also featured are interviews with fashion designers and other icons of the gothic and alternative subcultures, and myriad music reviews. Their main office is located in Portland, Oregon.

In August 2016 contributor Lenore (previously anchor of Rockworld TV) was announced as the new managing editor. She curated content for issues 49, 50 and 51.

The magazine is currently published along with a Gothic Beauty Box which is very beloved by Gothic influencers.

== See also ==
- Goth subculture
