= Hobby shop =

Shop selling recreational items for hobbyists

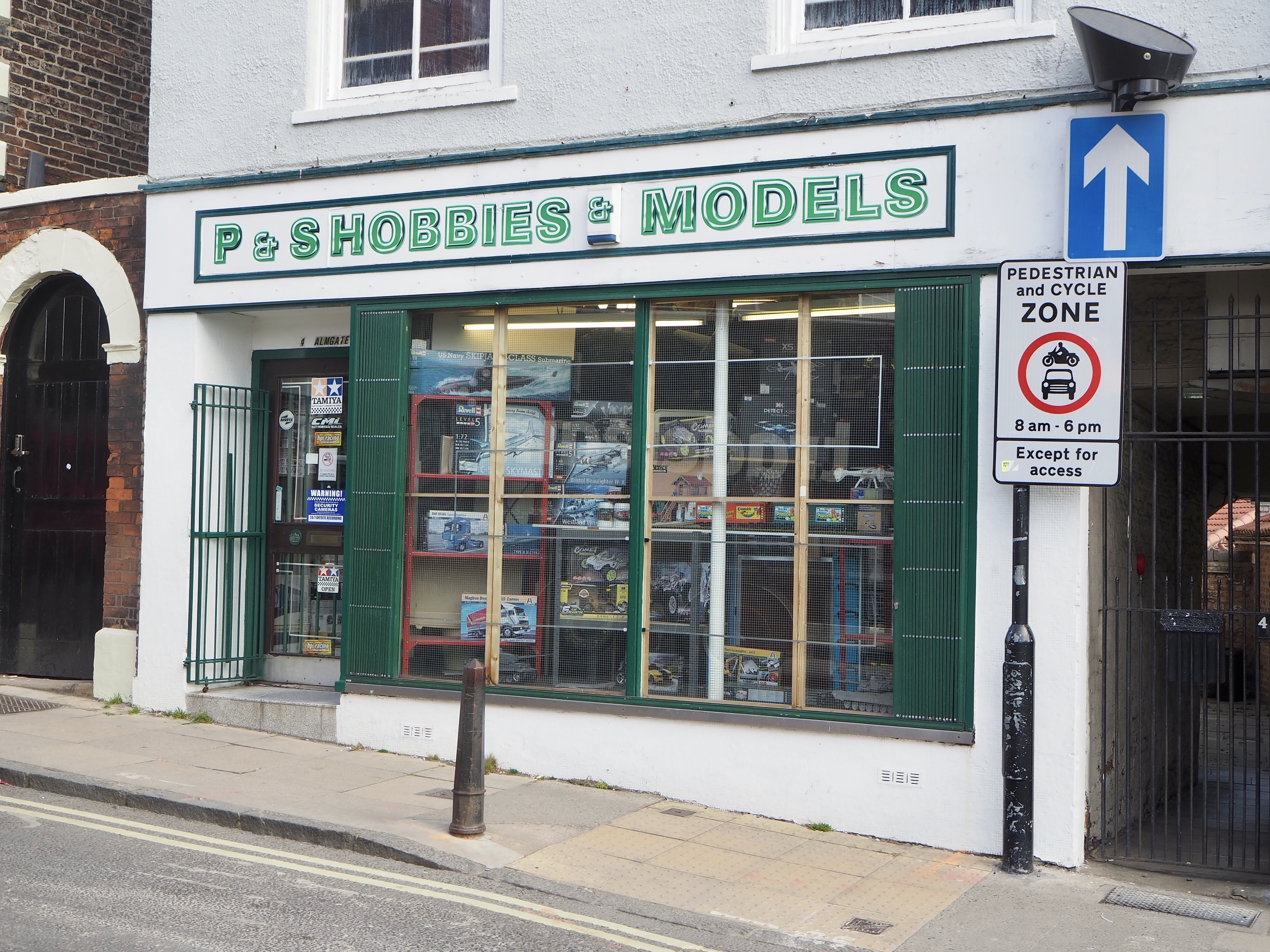
Hobby and model shop in York, England.

A hobby shop (or hobby store) is a type of marketplace that specializes in selling recreational or decorative items for hobbyists.

== Types ==
=== Modelling ===
Classical hobby stores specialize in modelling, craft supplies, and specialty magazines for model airplanes (military craft, private airplanes and airliners), model trains (locomotives, rolling stock, track, power packs and accessories), ship models, and house or building models. They may also sell R/C cars, pinewood derby kits, boats, and model or remote control planes.

=== Collectibles ===
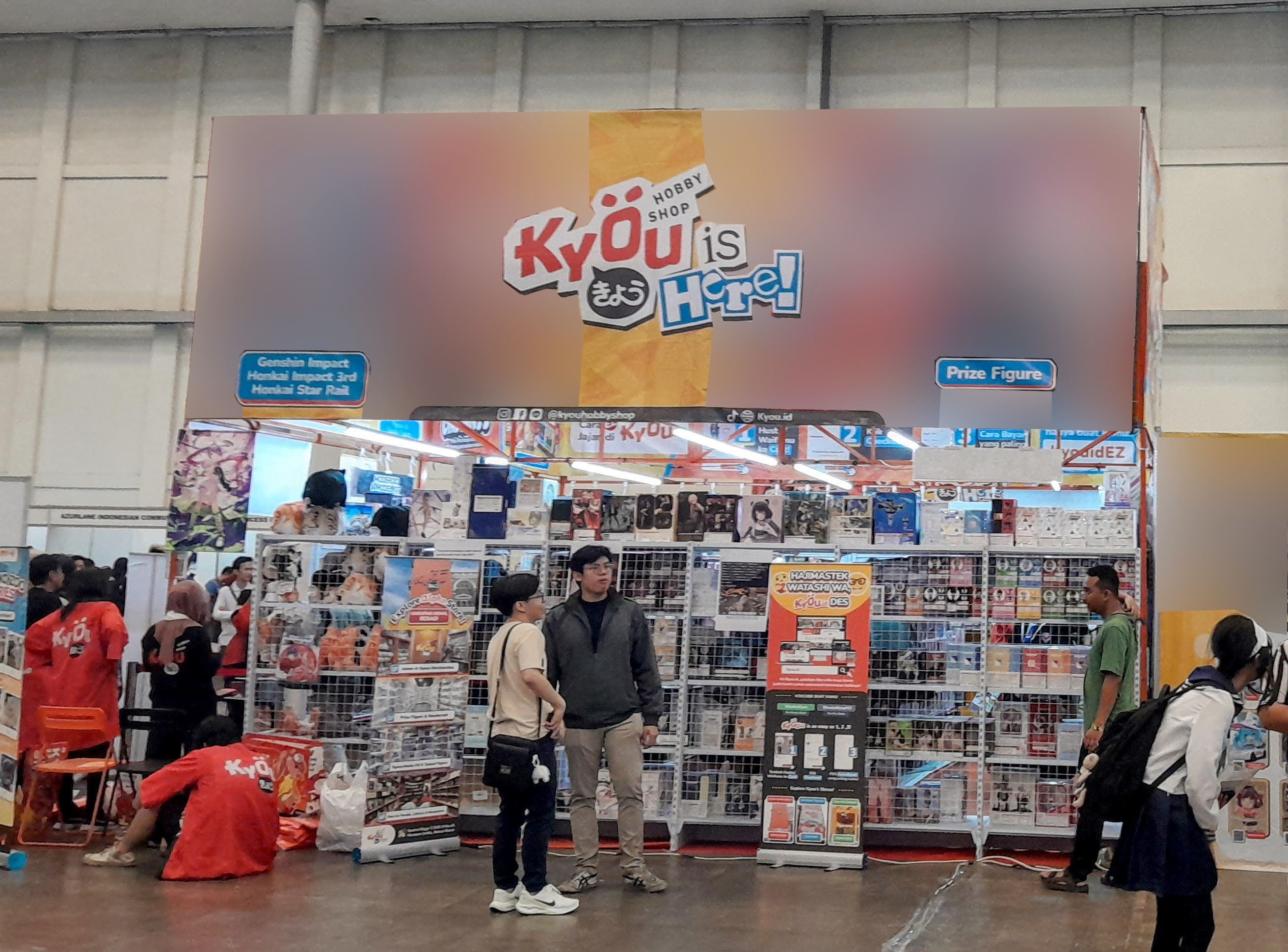
Collectible hobby shops at Comic Frontier 18 in BSD City, Indonesia.

Some hobby shops may also sell dolls, figures, and collectible coins and stamps.

=== Gaming ===
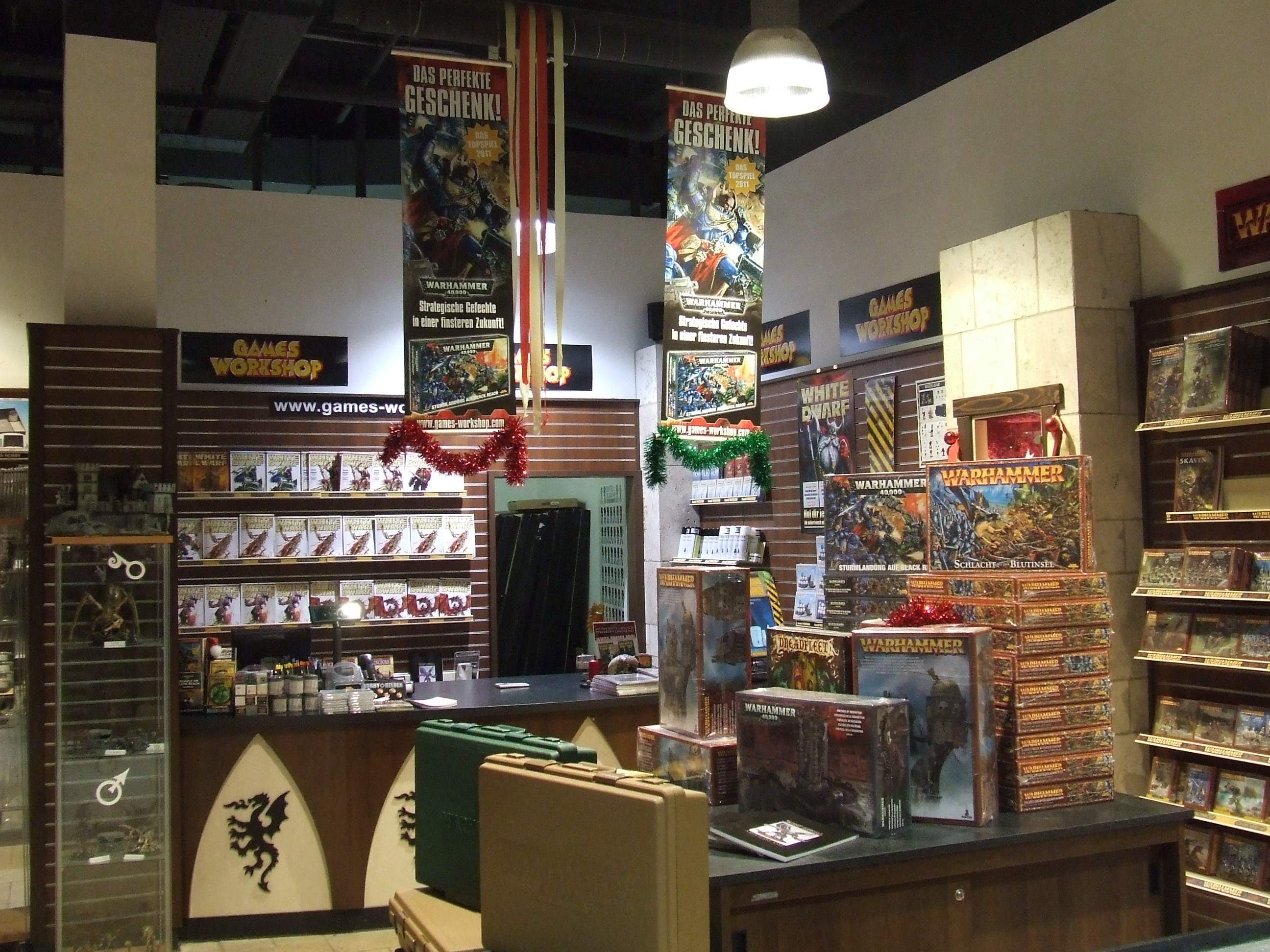
Interior of a wargaming Games Workshop store in Vienna, Austria.

A subtype of hobby shop is a game store, which sells jigsaw puzzles, card and board games and role playing games. Such stores sometimes may also contain community space for hobbyists (gamers) to mingle and play games. In recent years, board and card game hobby shops have often become part-cafes.

=== Computer ===
Another subtype of hobby shop is the computer store, which sells computers, software, services, and training. Computer hobby shops have traditionally sold computers, related network equipment, and services, more often than not, they are selling training in software like Adobe PhotoShop, Autodesk 3ds, web design and other creative software pursuits. As technology continues to evolve, the post "dot com" computer hobby shops have transformed these equipment and services to hands-on training environments where people gather and learn from one another. This is because several people who work in technology also have it as a hobby.

== See also ==
- Third place – Social space other than home or workplace
