= Costume shop =

Place where costumes are designed, built, and stored

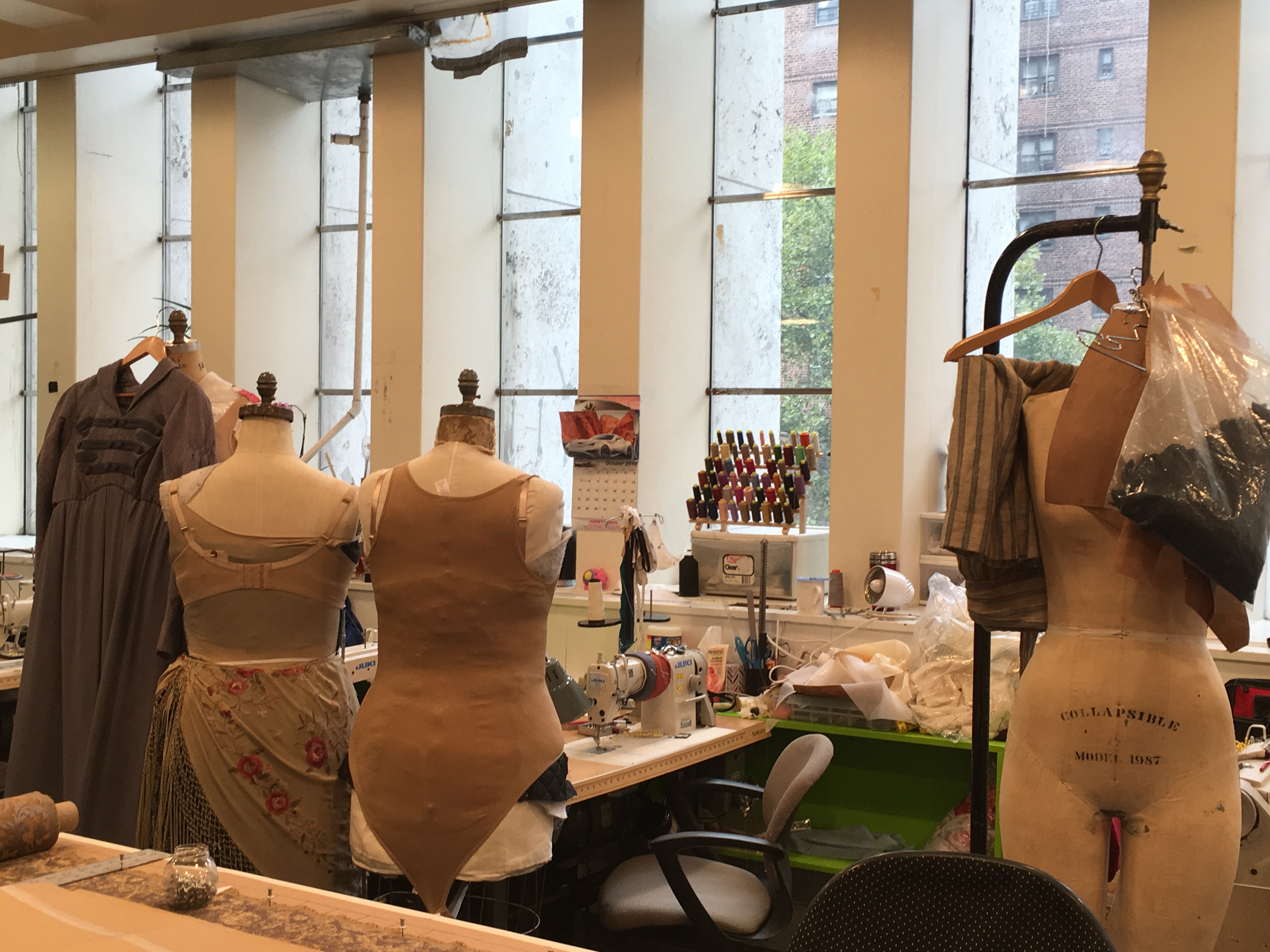
Costume shop at the Metropolitan Opera

A costume shop is a space where costumes for theatrical or film productions are designed, built, and stored for the company or production. Costume designers, builders, seamstresses, and stitchers work in costume shops. The shops themselves can vary in size, from one large room to a house with multiple floors. Costumes from past productions, fabric, jewelry and accessories are often stored in the shop.

== Purpose ==
A costume shop is where the costumes worn on stage for a production are built. Some costume shops have washers for cleaning costumes, fitting rooms, racks for storage or spaces for designers to conceptualize a costume. Some shops allow rentals of their costumes. However, the most common and primary purpose for a costume shop is for building and finishing pieces that go onstage.

There is no standard layout for costume shops, though most have stations for stitching or surging, cutting tables, fabric storage, and finishing tables. A large an expansive costume shop style helps work to enable productions to be mounted lavishly and permit study and experimentation at the same time. The process of building a costume requires many steps and stations, which the costume designer first conceptualizes. But before building can begin, the designer must choose where the costumes will come from.

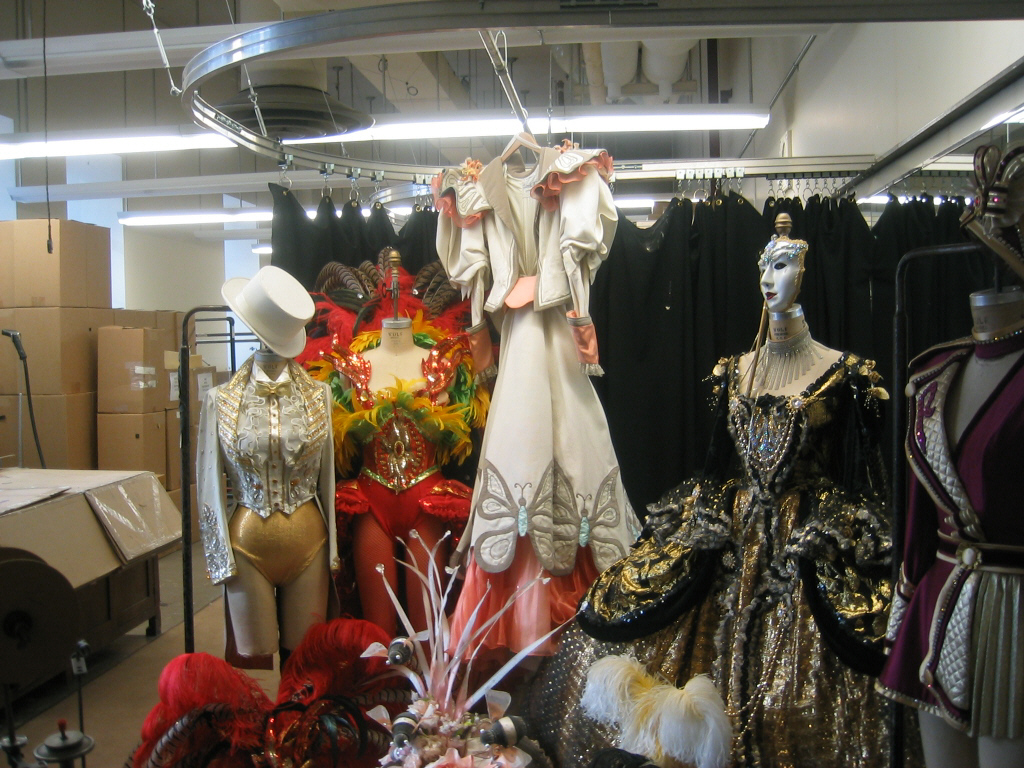
Costume storage at the Radio City Music Hall

Once the show is designed, pieces can come from a multitude of places, but there are commonly four options:

- Rented, either from other theatres, businesses, or individuals
- Pulled, which refers to searching through a costume shops stock. That is, "pulling" from the rack of stored costumes.
- Constructed, ones that the designer and costume shop create themselves.
- Shopped, items that can be purchased from outside sources.

The costume shop will search, place orders, create, organize, and dole out the costumes for each production and each character in the manner that best fits the costume and production itself. For instance, not every shoe is cobbled in the shop, or "in house"; some are bought and some are borrowed.

== History ==
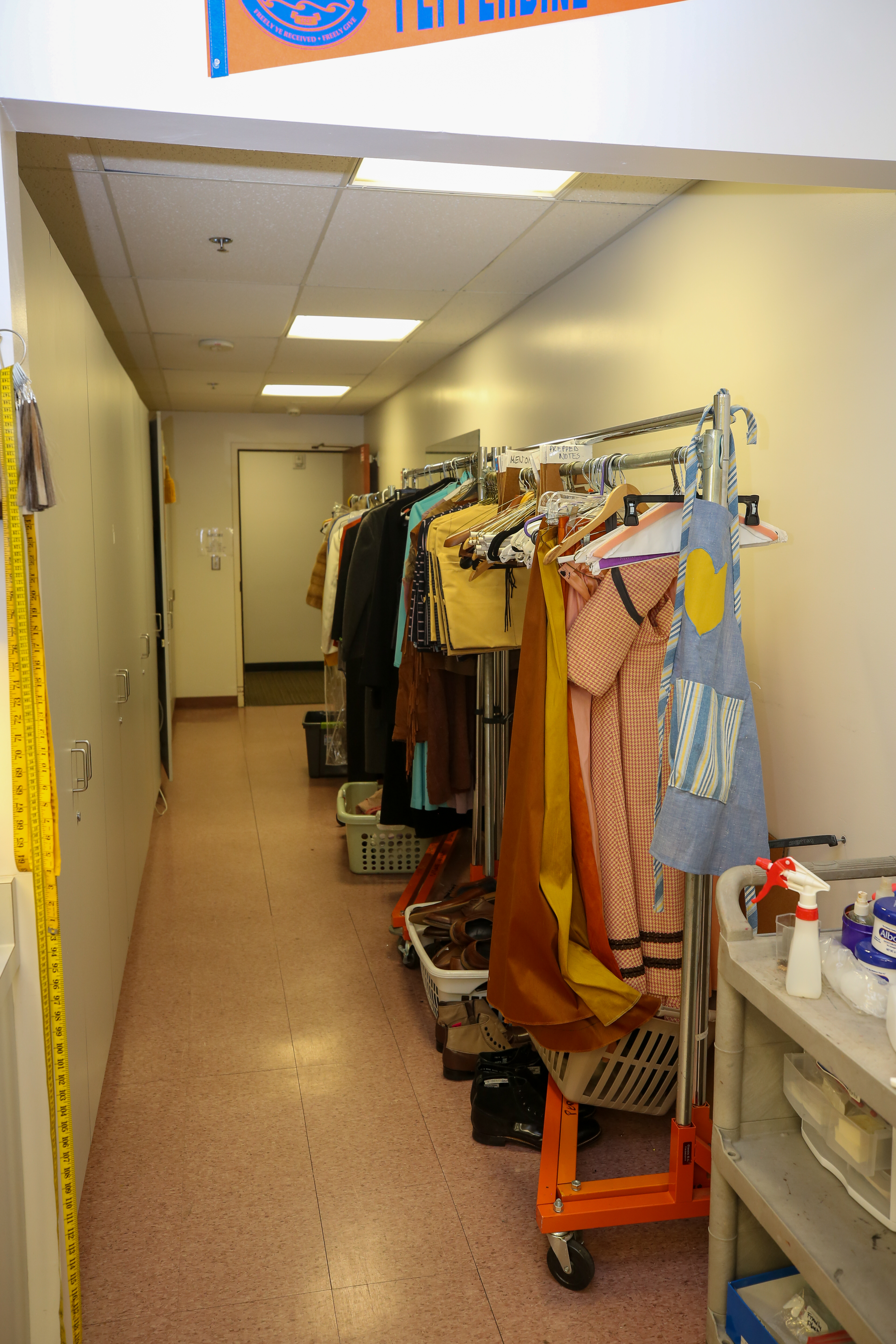
A university costume shop workspace with sewing stations and fabric storage.

Costume shops date back to ancient Greek and Roman theaters. Many actors brought their clothes for the productions. By the medieval and Renaissance periods, costumes grew more elaborate, often tailored or borrowed from patrons, particularly for performances in royal courts and religious pageants.

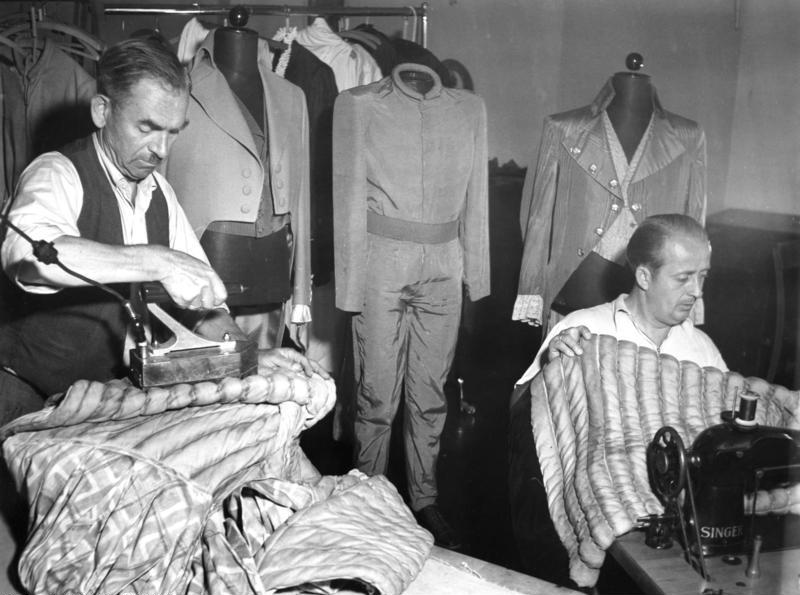
Costume making for Schiller-Theater in Berlin.

As theater grew into a profession in the 18th and 19th centuries, companies began creating in-house wardrobe departments for costume creation, maintenance, and storage. A great support for this growth was the industrial revolution as it expanded the access to fabrics and tools, aiding costume production. With new demands towards costume shops, there were studios, like Metro-Goldwyn-Mayer (MGM), that built wardrobe departments for fast-paced productions.

In the mid-20th century, universities and community theaters established costume shops, providing training in techniques like hand-stitching and dyeing. In current times, modern tools are used with traditional techniques

== Modern Tools and Trends ==
Some of the current digital design software used are Adobe Illustrator, Procreate, and CLO 3D. They are used to create costume renderings and technical patterns before making the costumes. These methods allow for possible alterations of the costume design as the visualization is more precise and detailed than a traditional sketch. Modern technology also makes it easier to update designs. For instance, if a costume's color doesn't work for the production, it can be changed with just a layer adjustment instead of redoing the entire sketch. Some shops also incorporate textile printers to produce custom fabric patterns directly in-house.

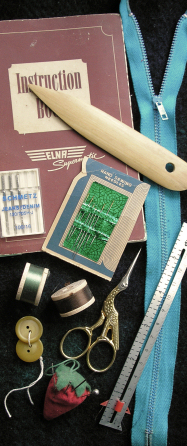
Common sewing tools used costume shops.

Other tools are Laser cutters and 3D printers. Often, these tools are used to make detailed accessories to speed up production but traditional skills remain at the heart of costume creation, and many costume professionals still train through hands-on work with many shops choosing to repurpose older costumes.

== Jobs within ==
Within a costume shop, there are people working on different parts of the creative or accumulative process. The size of the theatre or company will determine whether each job goes to one person, if a group of individuals share more than one job, or if everyone pitches in on everything.

=== Costume designer ===
The costume designer is an integral part of the production's creative team. They work closely with the director to develop a look for the actors onstage that best serves the plot of the play and concept the director has envisioned. "The Costume Designer seeks inspiration from many sources, including interviews with the actors who will play the characters, and extensive historical and visual research." Whether the costume designer is a permanent position or a by-production hire will determine whether they are considered the head of the costume department or shop

=== Assistant designer ===
The assistant designer helps the head designer with the jobs that must be completed. This includes but is not limited to research, shopping, rental acquisition and fittings for actors.

=== Cutter/draper ===
The cutter/draper is responsible for making patterns, cutting, fitting and construction of costumes from specific designs or sketches supplied by the designer. "The Cutter may assist in selecting materials and supervising the costume construction." In most shops there are multiple cutters and drapers to ease and spread out work load.

=== Costume coordinator/supervisor/shop manager ===
A shop manager is responsible for daily goings on in the shop, much like a manager in a building or restaurant. They deal with the costume budget from the producers, manufacturing and purchasing, as well as work and costume building schedules and production crew requirements.

=== Stitcher/Tailor (sewer, seamstress, costume builder) ===
A stitcher works on the actual construction of the costumes. The stitcher will sometimes assist during fittings to help with pinning and alterations. A stitcher will help pick up wherever needed, often stretching out from fittings, pinning, and alteration, to textiles, dye working and errands.

== Costume Shops across media ==
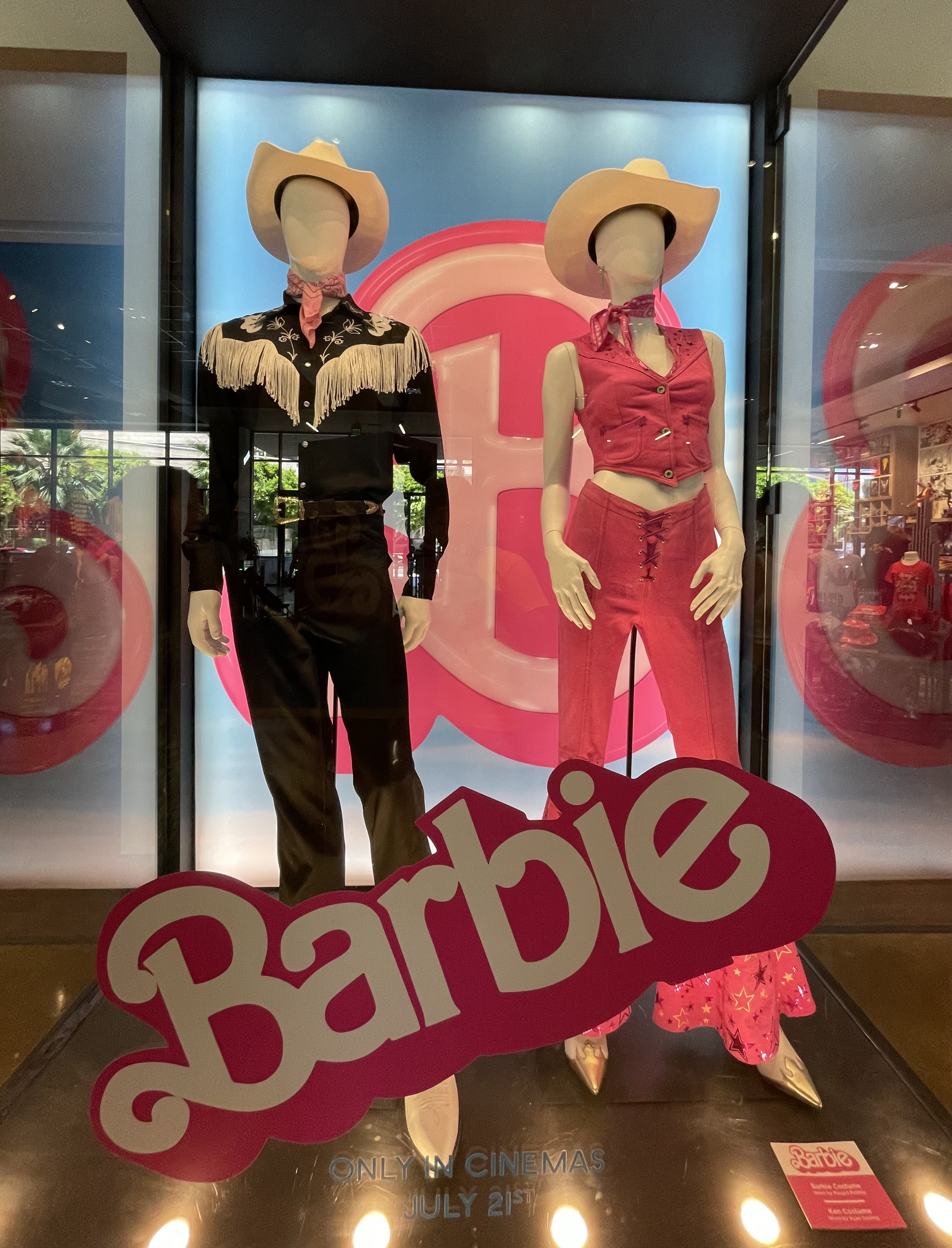
Barbie and Ken costumes worn by Margot Robbie and Ryan Gosling at Warner Bros. Studio Tour Hollywood.

In general, demands vary between theater, film and television. In theater, costumes must withstand being used in multiple performances and must factor in quick wardrobe changes. In Film and television, the costumes must have detail for close-ups and be good quality for shootings with different durations varying from days to weeks. Having multiple takes may require multiple versions of the same costume. In these cases, costumes are usually designed to be camera-ready rather than stage-durable. As designer Ann Roth explained, stage costumes are built for endurance and movement, while film pieces prioritize how they appear on camera.

Some costume shops also serve theme parks, dance companies, and commercial productions, where performers may wear the same outfit for extended periods. These costumes are meant for comfort and movement rather than historical accuracy or high detail.

== Industry Challenges ==
Costume shops face several ongoing challenges varying in nonprofit or educational environments. One example being limited budgets that restrict access to quality fabrics and specialty tools. Costume shops are also subject to tight schedules where fittings, alterations, and the making of the costumes are needed opening night and shooting. A tight schedule and limited budget requires much creativity with staff in terms of sourcing or making the costumes. Additionally, in terms of staff, there's a growing shortage of skilled labor for costume shops as fewer young professionals are entering these trades.

Another concern is the preserving and storing costumes between shows as climate-controlled environments are need. Without a climate-controlled environment, older garments may deteriorate due to moisture, insects, or light exposure. In such cases, some shops partner with archives or rental services to offload long-term storage.

== See also ==
- Costume designer
- Costume coordination
