= Outburn =

American music magazine

- Editor: Rodney Kusano
- Categories: Alternative rock, heavy metal, punk rock
- Frequency: Bimonthly (five issues per year)
- Founder: Octavia Laird; Rodney Kusano
- Founded: 1996; 29 years ago
- First issue: August 1996; 29 years ago
- Country: Thousand Oaks, California, United States
- Language: American English
- Website: www.outburn.com
- ISSN: 1542-1309
- OCLC: 50797728

Outburn is a print magazine and online publication focusing on alternative rock, heavy metal, punk rock, indie rock, and other genres. It presents news on bands, music releases, and events, in-depth interviews, high-quality studio and live photography, and music reviews. From March 2018 to March 2021, the print magazine was on hiatus after the departure of an editorial staff member. In one of the first still available About Us pages after the departure of the editorial staff member, Octavia Laird's name was notably erased from the founder's section of the About Us page. A protracted legal battle ensued over the future of Outburn as a result of Octavia's departure However, in April 2021, Outburn resumed publication of the print magazine, beginning with issue #93, in celebration of their 25th anniversary.

== History ==
Outburn was founded in the summer of 1996 by Rodney Kusano (rodent ek) and Octavia Laird. The founders initially discussed launching a mail-order catalog, but decided to launch a magazine as Octavia began doing on-air interviews as a DJ. In a 1997 interview, Octavia said: "I saw people do "homemade" zines & I thought I could do that." Its first issue was published in August 1996. Reviewing the debut issue in November 1996, Alternative Press praised its "stylish" page designs and wrote that it "[showed] potential despite some less than thought-provoking questions and a hefty cover price". The magazine's circulation circa issue 5 (late 1997) was 3,400, double what it was at launch. Outburn initially specialized on what the magazine described as "Subversive & Post-Alternative music"—electronic, gothic, noise, ambient and industrial music. It later transitioned into a mainstream rock and metal magazine.

== Staff ==
publisher + editor + creative director: Rodney Kusano

editor-in-chief: Jeremy Saffer

writers: Anabel DFlux, Stephanie Jensen, Colleen Johnson, Mischa Perlman, Becton Simpson, Kevin Stewart-Panko, Sammie Star

photographers: Anabel DFlux, Jeremy Saffer
