= John Capodice =

American character actor (1941–2024)

- Born: December 25, 1941; Chicago, Illinois, U.S.
- Died: December 30, 2024 (aged 83); Blauvelt, New York, U.S.
- Occupation: Actor
- Years active: 1978–2024

John Capodice (December 25, 1941 – December 30, 2024) was an American character actor.

== Acting career ==
=== Television ===
Capodice began his film and television career in the late 1970s. His first role was in the ABC-TV soap opera Ryan's Hope, where he appeared in six episodes as Lloyd Lord. He had guest roles on numerous other television series, including Spenser: For Hire, Kate & Allie, Seinfeld, Murder, She Wrote, Murphy Brown, Knots Landing, Hunter, and Law & Order. He appeared on the series Moonlighting in 1989 and performed as a guest star in an episode of NBC-TV's Will & Grace (episode 1.21), in the role of the repairman who suffers a heart attack.

His later television appearances were on The West Wing, Six Feet Under and CSI: Crime Scene Investigation.

In a 1980s television ad for Polly-O String Cheese, Capodice portrayed Fred, a dumbfounded pizzeria owner, who is asked by three teens to make a pizza with extra cheese, but to hold the tomato sauce, and the crust. Essentially a pizza, with "nuttin." He also appeared as a trucker who gives medical advice in a popular ad for Dimetapp Cold Medicine.

=== Theatre work ===
Capodice also worked in the theatre, appearing mainly in Off-Broadway productions. He appeared as a prison guard in the play Getting Out at the Marymount Manhattan Theatre in October/November 1978 and at the Lucille Lortel Theatre from May 1979 to December 1980. The play won two Outer Critics Circle Awards in 1979. Capodice appeared in the Broadway production of Requiem For a Heavyweight, opposite John Lithgow, George Segal, and John C. McGinley.

=== Films and voice work ===
Capodice appeared as Doyle in the 1982 film Q and in the 1989 film Family Business as Tommy. Other film appearances are in the 1991 Oliver Stone film The Doors and the 1989 comedy See No Evil, Hear No Evil, where he appears as a bookmaker. He had roles in Ace Ventura: Pet Detective, Naked Gun 33 1/3: The Final Insult (1994), Speed (1994), Independence Day (1996), and Enemy of the State (1998). He provided the voice of Sidney Pen in the 2010 video game Mafia II.

== Personal life and death ==
Capodice was born in Chicago, Illinois, on Christmas Day of 1941. (Note: Some sources incorrectly list 1938 as his birth year, but most, including Intelius, list 1941) He lived in Los Angeles, California, and later in Blauvelt, New York. Capodice died on December 30, 2024, at the age of 83.

== Selected filmography ==
- Ryan's Hope (1978, TV series) as Lloyd Lord
- Q (1982) as Doyle
- The Equalizer (1985, TV series) as Father Antonelli - "The Confirmation Day"
- The Secret of My Success (1987) as Man In KRS Building
- Wall Street (1987) as Dominick
- Spike of Bensonhurst (1988) as Mafia Eater
- See No Evil, Hear No Evil (1989) as Scotto
- Family Business (1989) as Tommy
- Internal Affairs (1990) as Chief Healy
- Blue Steel (1990) as Trial Commissioner
- Q&A (1990) as Hank Mastroangelo
- Gremlins 2: The New Batch (1990) as Fire Chief
- Jacob's Ladder (1990) as Army Officer
- Seinfeld “The Revenge” (1991) as Laundromat Vic
- The Doors (1991) as Jerry
- The Hard Way (1991) as Detective Grainy
- Honeymoon in Vegas (1992) as Salvatore 'Sally Molars'
- Family Prayers (1993) as Barber #1
- Point of No Return (1993) as Detective
- The Evil Inside Me (1993) as Uncle Lou
- Ace Ventura: Pet Detective (1994) as Sergeant Aguado
- Naked Gun 33 1/3: The Final Insult (1994) as Mr. Big
- Speed (1994) as Bob, The Bus Driver
- Trial by Jury (1994) as 'Limpy' DeMarco
- The Scout (1994) as Caruso
- A Low Down Dirty Shame (1994) as Mob Boss
- Boy Meets World (1994, TV series) as Chubbie
- Murder, She Wrote (1994) as Lt. Giordano
- General Hospital (1994-1995, TV series) as Carmine Cerullo
- The Misery Brothers (1995) as Lieutenant Al Dente
- The Phantom (1996) as Al, The Cabby
- Independence Day (1996) as Mario
- Wedding Bell Blues (1996) as Jasmine's Father
- Dilemma (1997) as Ramsey
- True Friends (1998) as Tony 'Big Tony'
- Hoods (1998) as Sammy
- With Friends Like These... (1998) as Actor Friend
- Enemy of the State (1998) as Older Worker #1
- Ringmaster (1998) as Mel Riley
- Kiss of a Stranger (1998) as Detective Brown
- Simon Says (1998) as Frankie
- Follow Your Heart (1999) as Polo Manager
- A Wake in Providence (1999) as Uncle Sal
- Chain of Command (2000) as Cameron Ellis
- Price of Glory (2000) as Priest
- The Amati Girls (2000) as Danny
- Out of the Black (2001) as Dirk Hobson
- Double Bang (2001) as Frankie Carbonaro
- A Month of Sundays (2001) as Sleeper Man
- Blasphemy the Movie (2001) as Jehova's Witness
- Desert Rose (2002) as Donny Diamond
- The Streetsweeper (2002) as Unknown
- Carolina (2003) as Ernie, The Cook
- Shut Up and Kiss Me (2004) as Mr. Grummace
- Jesus, Mary and Joey (2005) as Joey Vitello Sr.
- Everybody Hates Chris (2005) as Bus Driver
- 10th & Wolf (2006) as Sipio
- Cattle Call (2006) as Public Defender
- CSI: Crime Scene Investigation (2007–2008, TV Series) as Lou Gedda
- Dark Room Theater (2009) as Sam
- Detention (2010) as Workman 1
- Pizza with Bullets (2010) as Mr. Tortellini
- Last Call (2012) as Joe 'Jo-Jo'
- Miami or Bust: A Hoboken Bet (2012) as Mr. Cacciatore
- Sharkskin (2015) as Don Piano
- Frank and Ava (2018) as Lee
- Lost Angelas (2019) as Detective Ed Robles
- Teenage Mutant Ninja Turtles: Mutant Mayhem (2023) as Cabdriver (voice)
- Conversations with a Mobster (2024, TV series) as Big John final role
