= Standing Ovation (film) =

- Theatrical release poster
- Directed by: Stewart Raffill
- Written by: Stewart Raffill
- Produced by: Diane Kirman
- Starring: Kayla Jackson; Kayla Raparelli; Najee Wilson; Pilar Martin; Alexis Biesiada; Devon Jordan; Ashley Cutrona; Erika Corvette; London Clark; Jeanna Zettler; Alanna Palombo; Joei DeCarlo
- Cinematography: Jon Darbonne
- Edited by: Laurie McDowell
- Music by: Benedikt Brydern
- Production company: Kenilworth Film Productions
- Distributed by: Rocky Mountain Pictures
- Release date: July 16, 2010
- Running time: 106 minutes
- Country: United States
- Language: English
- Budget: $5.6 million
- Box office: $550,418

Standing Ovation is a 2010 American musical film written and directed by Stewart Raffill. Produced by Kenilworth Film Productions, Standing Ovation had a limited theatrical release on July 16, 2010.

== Plot ==
The singing group the 5 Ovations perform at a talent contest. A rival group, The Wiggies' father sabotages another group's performance. In the dressing room, the Ovations encounter Alanna Wannabe, a pesky little girl who desperately wants to join the Ovations and the Wiggies. Once The Wiggies are finished with their performance, Ziggy Wiggies bribes the stage manager to sabotage the Ovations' performance by putting pepper in their microphones, causing them to sneeze and lose the contest.

The next day at school, Cameron tells the rest of the group about CDS's Best Music Video Contest. Maya tells the group about the Wiggies' rehearsal at the school. At that point, they decide to make their video and submit it to the contest.At the Wiggies' video shoot, Maya recruits Eric Bateman to assist the Ovations in making their video. At a show in a retirement home, the Ovations' manager, Joei Battalucci and Brittany confront a man who has information about money stolen from an account run by Joei.

At the show, Alanna decides to make her own video. Once the Ovations arrive at the recording, they start recording a cover of "River Deep – Mountain High" by Ike & Tina Turner. They later watch the video with Eric and his brother. Because the Wiggies ruined their video, Joei pays the chef to put frogs in the Wiggies' soup. Joei finds the "Snuffer Guy" and books a trip to Philadelphia to find him while Brittany, Cameron and Maya do a commercial. They shoot their final entry titled "Scream" but later, one of the Wiggies re-edits the video.

At school the next day, the Wiggies are admitted into the finals but the Ovations are not. Later, Tatiana calls Brittany saying that the group who was admitted instead of the Ovations has been disqualified and the Ovations are next in line for the semi-finals. Meanwhile, Alanna was also admitted into the semi-finals. The Wiggies' plan backfires on them. While the re-edit was too comedic, the Ovations move onto the finals. While auditioning dancers for the finals, Alanna announces that she manages all the dancers. She strikes a deals with the Ovations & the dancers and Alanna join the number. During a Wiggies' party, the Ovations put fleas in the Wiggies' wigs.

While the Wiggies are at the show, the Ovations and their dancers are stuck on the road due to sabotage from the Wiggies. While the Wiggies receive positive reaction from the audience, only a few people give them a standing ovation.After the Ovations' performance, they receive a standing ovation from the whole audience (except Mr. and Mrs. Wiggs). Backstage, Joei tells Brittany that she found the thief that they've been chasing down. The Ovations end up winning the contest with the Wiggies in second place. When Joei and Brittany go to confront the thief, Brittany discovers that he is her father and becomes upset with Joei and Joei has an asthma attack. Brittany's father makes things right between them by buying a house for Joei, presents for the neighborhood & hosting a party for the people in the competition.

== Cast ==
- Kayla Jackson as Brittany O'Brien
- Alanna Palombo as Alanna Wannabe
- Pilar Martin as Blaze
- Kayla Raparelli as Cameron
- Najee Wilson as Maya
- Alexis Biesiada as Tatiana
- Joei DeCarlo as Joei Battaluci
- Rocco Fiorentino as Bateman
- Bobby Harper as Mr. Wannabe
- Austin Powell as Mark O'Brien
- P. Brendan Mulvey as Gramps O'Brien
- William McKenna as Eric Bateman
- Brooke Feldman as Duet Girl
- Joann Reagan as Nursing Home Dance Captain
- Mario Macaluso as Kenny Rich
- Dexter Darden as MC John
- Sal Dupree as Mr. Wiggs
- Jeana Zettler as Zoey Wiggs
- London Clark as Ziggy Wiggs
- Erika Corvette as Angel Wiggs
- Devon Jordan as Twiggy Wiggs
- Susie Newstadter as Mrs. Wiggs
- Ashley Cutrona as Zita Wiggs
- Paula Tramutolo as Jasmine

== Soundtrack ==
The Standing Ovation soundtrack was released by Kenliworth Films on May 25, 2010 on AmazonMP3. On August 3, 2010, the album was released on iTunes and split into two CDs, one which features The Wiggies, and the other, featuring The 5 Ovations.

The film features a cover of "River Deep – Mountain High" originally by Ike & Tina Turner and Phil Spector as well as an original song titled "Blush" by Billboard hit songwriter and record producer Roy Hamilton III. Award winning composer/producer Edward B. Kessel, produced and wrote several of the songs on the Standing Ovation soundtrack including "Dancing Girls".

Track List

1. "All I Wanna Do Is Sing" – The 5 Ovations
2. "Scream" – The 5 Ovations
3. "Blush" – The Wiggies (produced by Roy Hamilton III)
4. "Thing 4 U" – Diverse
5. "That Boy" – The Wiggies
6. "Superstar" – The Wiggies
7. "Crazy Feet" – The 5 Ovations
8. "Soup to Nuts" – Mr. Wiggs and The Wiggies
9. "The Runway" (feat. Daade) – Dacav5 (produced by N Pa)
10. "The Music is Dropping You" (feat. Daade) – Dacav5 (produced by Daade)
11. "Dancing Girl" – The Wiggies
12. "Shooting Star" – The 5 Ovations
13. "Turn It Up" – Mr. Wiggs
14. "Our Songs Begins Again" – Jacklyne Tasca
15. "Standing Ovation" – Austin Powell and Devon Jordan
16. "All I Wanna Do is Sing" (Single Mix) – Alexis Biesiada

== Release ==
During the promotion of Standing Ovation, the cast performed at venues across the US while traveling in a tour bus. Performances included a show before a crowd of 60,000 people at the Dallas Freedom Concert and an appearance on the main stage at Knott’s Berry Farm in California.

Standing Ovation premiered at Universal CityWalk, which was attended by associate producer James Brolin as well as Barbra Streisand and Josh Brolin. After the film's opening, the cast of Standing Ovation performed a concert raising $60,000 for the children of the Ranfurly Home Orphanage in The Bahamas.

== Reception ==
=== Critical response ===
The film was panned by mainstream critics. On Rotten Tomatoes the film has 6% rating based on reviews from 17 critics. On Metacritic it has a score of 22 based on 6 reviews, indicating "Generally unfavorable reviews". Joe Leydon of Variety magazine called it "at once annoyingly hyper and underwhelmingly dull." Mick LaSalle of the San Francisco Chronicle said "Standing Ovation is an innovative film in the sense that every minute or so it comes up with a different way of being annoying." Gary Thompson of Philadelphia Daily News said "Standing Ovation will have its work cut out for it at the viciously competitive box office, but the film may serve as a springboard for the eager and able talent on display." The Last Airbender and Standing Ovation appeared on the "Worst of 2010" movie list by Ain’t It Cool News. Chris Hewitt of the St. Paul Pioneer Press said that he "had never heard of the people in Standing Ovation and I hope to never hear of any of them again." On August 20, 2015, CraveOnline declared the film the 37th "Worst Movie of the Decade (So Far)".

Standing Ovation received mixed reviews from family-centric critics. The Dove Foundation reviewed the film and gave it their Dove Seal of Approval for the family audience. Dove said "This is a comical musical about a group of young singers and dancers as they try to make their dreams come true. It’s an upbeat film geared towards the tween set." Roger Moore in Paradise Post said "Director Stewart Raffill (The New Swiss Family Robinson) is an old pro who at least makes the laughs work." Scholastic News Kids Press Corps said "Standing Ovation is a rocking and colorful movie about musical competitions, friendship, loyalty, and dreams—BIG DREAMS!"

Some critics praised the cast for their performances. Carrie Rickey of The Philadelphia Inquirer said "the cast is full of fresh-faced unknowns ready for their close-ups. Most likely to succeed is Kayla Jackson, an almond-eyed dreamer". William Bibbiani of Geekscape says "Standing Ovation is a film that received a small theatrical run in the middle of the summer. You were probably too busy watching Inception to notice. The film was written and directed by Stewart Raffill, who also helmed the wonderful 1980s sci-fi action romp The Ice Pirates, and features a cast of dozens of youngsters competing in a music video contest..." "...in theaters around the country audiences are slowly beginning to discover Standing Ovation, one of the must-see movies of the year." Jack Fitcher of the Cape May County Herald said "The movie is rich in dance numbers set to music that will be loved by teens and pre-teens which is the target audience. Even though this reporter is about 30 years older than the targeted demographic, I got caught up in the plot and enjoyed seeing so much local talent on the screen."

=== Box office ===
The film was a box office bomb. The film had a limited release and earned a gross of $531,806 in the United States. and made $18,612 internationally.

== Home media ==
The film was released on DVD format as of November 29, 2010. On November 15, 2011, a companion DVD Standing Ovation Dance Party: Keep Fit! was released.
