= Duino (film) =

Before We Forget
- Theatrical release poster
- Duino
- Directed by: Juan Pablo Di Pace; Andrés Pepe Estrada
- Starring: Juan Pablo Di Pace; Santiago Madrussan; Oscar Morgan; August Wittgenstein
- Production company: Momento Films
- Release date: 2024
- Running time: 108 minutes
- Country: Argentina
- Languages: English; Spanish

Duino is a 2024 romantic drama film directed by and starring Juan Pablo Di Pace. It was released in the United States on July 11, 2025, under the title Before We Forget.

Inspired by Di Pace's life experiences, the film explores the first love of a homosexual Argentinian teenager, Matias, while a student at UWC Adriatic, who grew up to be a film producer to reconstruct his memories.

== Plot ==
Matias came to UWC Adriatic, an international school in Duino, Italy, as a first year student in 1997, together with Alex from Sweden, with whom he soon developed romantic feelings. Alex was expelled after a prank and an argument with the headmaster, and Matias went into a period of depression until he was invited by Alex's family to spend the Christmas holidays together. During the holiday, Matias struggled to express his feelings for Alex, while Alex's sister Kathrine made romantic moves to Matias.

More than 20 years later, Matias became a debut film producer who wished to produce a movie about this experience, but struggled to recreate the story exactly the way he wanted. By chance, he discovered the lost VHS tape documenting his experience. Invited to Kathrine's wedding, he flew to meet and reconcile with Alex.

== Reception ==
=== Accolades ===
The film has won numerous awards in film festivals before release. At NewFest 2024, Duino won Audience Award for Narrative Feature and U.S. Narrative Jury Special Mention. At Rio LGBTQIA+ Festival Internacional de Cinema, Duino won Best International Feature Film.

=== Critical response ===
Alan Ng, for Film Threat, wrote: "Duino is a delicate, heartfelt exploration of identity, artistic passion, and the complexities of human connection. With its quiet yet powerful storytelling, Juan Pablo Di Pace and Andrés Pepe Estrada’s film captures the inner turmoil of coming of age in a world that doesn’t always understand you. It’s a meditative and moving journey, reminding us that self-expression is always worth the struggle, no matter how messy."

"Set against the backdrop of Italy’s Adriatic Coast, the film explores themes of memory, infatuation and self-discovery", noted Jake Wittich for the Sun Times. Cameron Scheetz, meanwhile, found that the film was "[b]lurring the lines between reality and fiction". The same comment was made by Eugene Sun for Instinct, the reviewer adding that "the result is a meta-romantic drama that moves between timelines and memory".
