= Questions!/Answers? =

Educational film series

Questions!/Answers? is a series of ten educational films released in 1975 by Walt Disney Productions. The series dealt with many moral topics and it excerpted many sequences from various live-action Disney films.

== Films ==
- Alcoholism: Who Gets Hurt? — a child is facing alcoholism of his parents. Includes excerpts from Follow Me, Boys!
- Love and Duty: Which Comes First? — on the notion of loyalty, duty and love. Includes excerpts from True Vagabond.
- Responsibility: What Are Its Limits? — personal responsibility
- Stepparents: Where Is the Love? — on adoptive families
- Optimist/Pessimist: Which Are You?
- Death: How Can You Live with It? — a boy learns to accept the death of her grandfather. Includes excerpts from Napoleon and Samantha.
- Your Career: Your Decision? — a girl wants to be a ballerina against the advice of her mother. Includes excerpts from Ballerina.
- Prejudice: Hatred or Ignorance — a young man tries to overcome prejudice. Includes excerpts from The Light in the Forest.
- Being Right: Can You Still Lose?
- Ambition: What Price Fulfillment?
