= Suzanne DeLaurentiis =

American actress

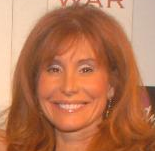
- Born: Born and raised in Mount Holly, New Jersey
- Other names: Graduated in 1980 from Rancocas Valley Regional High School, other notable classmate, Irving Fryer (NFL Football Player)
- Occupations: Actress, film producer
- Years active: 1982–current

Suzanne DeLaurentiis is an American film producer and actress. She founded the Cinema City International Film Festival in 2007. She won the Hollywood F.A.M.E. Lifetime Achievement Award in 2008. She was born and raised in Burlington County, New Jersey.

== Filmography ==
=== Producer ===
- My Lovely Bank (1982)
- Rocky V (1990)
- Mannequin Two: On the Move (1991)
- Mutant Man (1996)
- Pocket Ninjas (1997)
- The Vegas Connection (1999)
- Out of the Black (2001)
- A Month of Sundays (2001)
- Adjustments (2001)
- While You Were Waiting (2002)
- Jean Webster: The Mother Theresa of Atlantic City (2003)
- Shut Up and Kiss Me (2004)
- 10th & Wolf (2006)
- I Believe in America (2007)
- Deceit (2009)
- New Hope Manor (2009)
- Area 407 (2012)
- Dark Tourist (2012)
- How Sweet It Is (2014)

== Actress ==
- Evil Judgment (1984)
- Breaking All the Rules (1985)
- Junior (1985)
- Mannequin Two: On the Move (1991)
- Dirt Merchant (1999)
- Dark Tourist (2012)
