= Shut Up and Kiss Me (film) =

- DVD cover
- Directed by: Gary Brockette
- Written by: Steven Chase; Howard Flamm
- Produced by: Suzanne DeLaurentiis
- Starring: Christopher Daniel Barnes; Kristin Richardson; Krista Allen; Brad Rowe; Victoria Jackson; Leo Rossi; Burt Young
- Cinematography: Jacques Haitkin
- Edited by: Terry Kelley
- Music by: Andrew Gross
- Distributed by: American World Pictures (AWP)
- Release dates: March 5, 2004 (Washington D.C. Independent Film Festival); November 4, 2005 (United States)
- Running time: 101 minutes
- Country: United States
- Language: English

Shut Up and Kiss Me is a 2004 romantic comedy film starring Christopher Daniel Barnes, Kristin Richardson, Krista Allen, and Brad Rowe. It was written by Steven Chase and Howard Flamm and directed by Gary Brockette.

== Cast ==
- Christopher Daniel Barnes as Bryan Ballister
- Brad Rowe as Pete Waddle
- Kristin Richardson as Jessica Preston
- Krista Allen as Tiara Benedette
- Victoria Jackson as Harriet Ballister
- Leo Rossi as Mario
- Burt Young as Vincent Bublioni
- John Capodice as Mr. Grummace
- Frank Bonner as Harvey Ballister
- Veronica De Laurentiis as Aunt Isabella
- Tim Ware as Police Officer
- Kevin Meaney as Judge Walter Kapinsky
