= Juan Pablo Di Pace =

Argentine actor

- Born: 25 July 1979 (age 47); Buenos Aires, Argentina
- Occupation: Actor
- Years active: 1999–present

Juan Pablo Di Pace (born 25 July 1979) is an Argentine actor. He began his career in the United Kingdom, performing in a number of musicals and appearing in films like Survival Island (2005) and Mamma Mia! (2008). He later moved to Spain, starring in several television series from 2009 to 2012. In 2013, Di Pace moved to Los Angeles where he starred as Nicolas Treviño in the TNT drama series Dallas. And in 2014, he was cast as Jesus Christ in the NBC limited series A.D. The Bible Continues which earned him a Movieguide Award for Best Male Performance. From 2016 to 2020, he played the role of Kimmy Gibbler's estranged husband, Fernando, on Fuller House, a spin-off series of Full House. In 2024, Juan Pablo wrote, co-directed and starred in the film Duino, his directorial debut feature alongside Andres P. Estrada (co-director) and executive produced by Norman Lear.

== Early life and education ==
Di Pace was born in Buenos Aires, Argentina, and moved to Spain when he was twelve. He was raised Catholic. He lived in London for ten years. He speaks fluent Spanish, Italian and English. At age 17, he was awarded a scholarship to attend the United World College of the Adriatic in Duino, Trieste, Italy, later studied theatre at the London Studio Centre and at the HB Studio in New York City.

== Career ==
Prior to joining the big screen, he played the role of Danny Zuko in the Trieste production of Grease in Italy, partly directed by Di Pace. In 2003, he appeared in the London production of the Bob Fosse musical Chicago. For one year, he starred as Tony Manero in the 2009–2010 Spanish production of Saturday Night Fever in Madrid, with songs by The Bee Gees, produced by Stage Entertainment - which won him the title of "triple threat" by the European press. In 2011-12 he starred in the original Spanish production of Más de 100 Mentiras produced by Drive Entertainment, based on the songs of Spanish legend Joaquin Sabina. In 2017 he premiered his solo show in New York's 54 Below, which was nominated for Best "One Person Show" at the Broadway World Awards.

Di Pace has made several appearances on British television, such as the BBC One comedy The Catherine Tate Show, BBC One film Aftersun, BBC One series New Tricks and BBC Scotland soap River City, which he joined in 2005 playing the character of Luca Rossi. His on-screen debut was in the 2005 film Survival Island. He is also featured in Mamma Mia! (2008).

Di Pace also starred in the video for the 2004 Eric Prydz hit "Call on Me". In the video, he is the only man amongst a group of women in an aerobics class. He also directed and starred in the sequel What a Feeling by Hughes Corporation in 2006, which is loosely based on dance sequences from Flashdance and Dirty Dancing. In 2008 he directed a music video for Katie Melua. In 2009, he appeared on the music video Time Is Running Out by Muse.

Upon moving to Spain he played regular roles in TV series such as Supercharly, Angel o Demonio, Los Hombres de Paco, 90-60-90, and El Don de Alba. In 2011, he starred in the final season of Física o Química.

In 2013, Di Pace moved to the US and was cast as series regular billionaire businessman Nicolas Treviño for season 3 of the TNT drama series Dallas.

In 2014, Roma Downey and Mark Burnett cast Juan Pablo as Jesus Christ in the NBC series A.D. The Bible Continues which earned him a "Grace" Award at the 2016 Movieguide Awards.

In 2016, Di Pace appeared in a recurring role as Fernando, the fiancé and ex-husband of Kimmy Gibbler on the Netflix series Fuller House. Starting in the second season he was promoted to the main cast, playing the role for 5 seasons until the show's end in 2020.

In 2018, he was announced as one of the celebrities to compete on season 27 of Dancing with the Stars, being paired with the professional dancer Cheryl Burke. Despite earning five perfect scores and holding the highest average of the season, they were eliminated in the semi-finals. Len Goodman along with judges Carrie Ann Inaba and Bruno Tonioli, expressed their outrage for the results. A frustrated Len said, "I know the Americans, we like fair play but mostly we like justice. And there's no justice here." Fans of the TV show deemed Juan Pablo's premature exit "ridiculous," an "injustice" and "not acceptable."

in 2024, Di Pace wrote, starred and produced his debut feature film Duino (formerly known as "For Another Time") executive produced by Norman Lear and Brent Miller (producer), and co-directed by Andres P. Estrada -editor of Argentina, 1985, the 2022 Golden Globe Award for Best Foreign Language Film. Duino premiered in the US at Frameline Film Festival and won "Best International Feature" at Rio LGBTQIA+ Festival Internacional de Cinema.

== Personal life ==
Di Pace came out publicly as gay in March 2019 while giving a TEDx talk at the United World College Maastricht in The Netherlands called "The Story of Your Life".

== Filmography ==
=== Film ===
Year	Title	Role	Notes
2004	Piccadilly Jim	Ben	Uncredited
2005	Three	Manuel	Alternative title: Survival Island
2006	Aftersun	Felipe	TV film
2008	Mamma Mia!	Petros	
2009	Tutti intorno a Linda		
2013	Rubenesque	Hernandez	TV film
2015	Fuera de foco	Marcos	
2016	After the Reality	Dunkin	
2018	Admission	Russo	Short
2020	Dashing in December	Heath	TV film
2021	Resurrection	Jesus	
2021	Raise a Glass to Love	Marcelo Castillo	TV film
2023	The Mattachine Family	Oscar	
2024	Branching Out	T.J. Cruz	TV film
2024	Before We Forget	Matias	Also co-director

=== Television ===
Year	Title	Role	Notes
2005	New Tricks	Antonio	Episode: "Fluke of Luck"
2005	Mile High	Vito Garcia	Episode: "2.23"
2005–06	River City	Luca Rossi	Recurring role (2 episodes)
2006	The Catherine Tate Show	Salsa Dancer	Episode: "1951–2006"
2009	Los hombres de Paco	Carlo	Episode: "Todos los planes de Lucas Fernández"
2010	Supercharly		Recurring role (5 episodes)
2011	Ángel o demonio		Episode: "El demonio de los celos"
2011	Física o Química	Xavi López	Main cast (7 episodes)
2013	El don de Alba	Víctor	Recurring role (4 episodes)
2013	Camp	Miguel Santos	Recurring role (5 episodes)
2014	Dallas	Nicolas Treviño	Main cast (15 episodes)
2015	A.D. The Bible Continues	Jesus Christ	Recurring role (5 episodes)
2015	Tango Americano	Tango singer	TV Miniseries
2016	Rosewood	Antonio Espada	Episode: "Silkworms y Silencio"
2016–20	Fuller House	Fernando Hernandez-Guerrero-Fernandez-Guerrero	Main cast (69 episodes)
2017	Angie Tribeca	Ricardo Vasquez	Episode: "Welcome Back, Blotter"
2018	Dancing with the Stars	Himself	Contestant on Season 27; 5th place
2020	Minutiae	Tomás	Series regular
2022	Travesuras de la niña mala	Ricardo Somocurcio	Main cast
2025	My Argentine Heart	Diego	Hallmark movie

=== Theatre ===
Year	Play	Role	Venue	Notes
1999	Grease	Danny Zuko	Silvio Pellico Theatre, Trieste	
2000	Boléro	Performer	Sadler's Wells Theatre, London	
2002	Chicago	Aaron	Adelphi Theatre, London	with The Weissler Company
2009–10	Saturday Night Fever	Tony Manero	Teatro Coliseum, Madrid	with Stage Entertainment
2012	More Than 100 Lies	Juan	Teatro Rialto, Madrid	with Drive Entertainment
2012–13	Primer Acto (One Man Show)	Juan Pablo	Pequeño Teatro, Madrid	
2026	Schmigadoon!	Doc	Nederlander Theatre, Broadway	

== Awards and nominations ==
Year	Award	Category	Work	Result
2012	Mi Butaquita Theatre Awards	Best One Man Show	Primer Acto (One Man Show)	Won
2016	Movieguide Awards	Most Inspiring Performance in Television	A.D. The Bible Continues	Won
2016	Movieguide Awards	Best Actor - Television	A.D. The Bible Continues	Won
