= The Tender Warrior =

- Directed by: Stewart Raffill
- Written by: Stewart Raffill
- Produced by: Stewart Raffill
- Starring: Dan Haggerty
- Cinematography: Gerardo H. Wenziner
- Edited by: John Shouse
- Music by: Kenneth Wannberg
- Production companies: William Thompson Productions; Safari Films
- Distributed by: William Thompson International
- Release date: April 1971
- Running time: 85 min.
- Country: United States
- Language: English

The Tender Warrior is a 1971 film directed by Stewart Raffill and starring Dan Haggerty and Charles Lee. It was Raffill's debut feature as director.

== Cast ==
- Dan Haggerty as Cal
- Charles Lee as Sammy
- Liston Elkins as Pa Lucas

== Production ==
Stewart Raffill was an animal supervisor who would rent animals to films and TV series. He saved up enough money to finance this film. It was shot at the Okefenokee Swamp in Georgia. Raffill sold it to Warner Bros., was unhappy with what they did with it, bought it back, and re-distributed it.
