= High Risk (1981 film) =

- Film poster
- Directed by: Stewart Raffill
- Written by: Stewart Raffill
- Produced by: Anuar Badin; Gerald Green; Joseph Raffill
- Starring: James Brolin; Anthony Quinn; Lindsay Wagner; Bruce Davison; Cleavon Little; Chick Vennera; James Coburn; Ernest Borgnine
- Cinematography: Álex Phillips Jr.
- Edited by: Tom Walls
- Music by: Mark Snow
- Production companies: Hemdale Film Corporation; Viacom Productions
- Distributed by: American Cinema Releasing
- Release date: May 6, 1981 (United States)
- Running time: 94 minutes 90 minutes (Argentina video)
- Countries: United States; United Kingdom; Mexico
- Language: English
- Box office: $1.1 million

High Risk is a 1981 American-British-Mexican adventure heist film directed by Stewart Raffill and stars James Brolin, Lindsay Wagner, Cleavon Little, James Coburn, Ernest Borgnine and Anthony Quinn.

== Plot ==
During a period of sluggish economy and high unemployment, four friends—Stone, Tony, Dan and Rockney—gather for a fishing trip. The weekend getaway is a cover: they are really planning to fly to Colombia to rob a drug lord. They meet with Clint, who supplies them with weapons and target practice. It becomes clear that with the exception of Stone, the men have no relevant training and are not taking the heist seriously.

The men are flown to a jungle. Their target is Serrano, a sadistic drug lord who lives in a large villa. The group observes Serrano, his staff and various visitors from a hidden vantage point. They discuss whether they would have the courage to actually kill someone, and what they will do with their share of the cash once they return home. They infiltrate the villa, capture Serrano and his lover, and force Serrano to reveal the combination to his safe. They escape from the villa with five million dollars in cash. They travel on foot through the jungle, eventually finding horses to buy. Believing that they have been successful, the men camp for the night and celebrate. They are unaware that they are being observed by a rebel tracker.

When they wake the next day, Serrano’s men and the local military are approaching them in all-terrain vehicles and on horseback. They flee, but Tony and Rockney are captured by Serrano. Stone and Dan have to continue on foot and only escape their pursuers by leaping from a very high rope bridge. Serrano has Rockney beaten to force Tony to reveal the location of money. Knowing that Stone has his share of the cash and that they face better odds of escape in the open, Tony agrees to show them where the money is "hidden".

Serrano has them taken to a prison. They meet Olivia, the prisoner in the neighboring cell, who claims she was falsely arrested. Tony bribes a passing child to pull out the barred window of their cell with a tow truck. The child demands their clothes in payment also, and they are pursued virtually naked through the town. They lose their pursuers in a bordello. Dressed in women's clothes, Tony and Rockney make their way to a bus station and reunite with Olivia. They travel together to the rendezvous point.

Dan and Stone are captured by a local rebel leader, General Mariano, who wants the stolen money for himself. They escape, then turn and track the rebels until nightfall. They are forced to kill several of the rebels before they retrieve the cash. The rebels pursue them to the rendezvous point, where they expect to be airlifted to safety. Dan is wounded by Mariano’s tracker. In the ensuing firefight, Tony is shot trying to protect Stone.

Believing Tony is dead, the others continue to the airstrip without him. Serrano’s mercenaries have arrived ahead of them, and a three-way gun battle ensues. Serrano's men subdue the rebels. The retrieval plane arrives and provides covering fire, scattering Serrano’s men. The plane lands, the team boards hurriedly, and they make their escape. They are celebrating their success when the engine stalls.

== Cast ==
- James Brolin as Stone
- Anthony Quinn as Mariano
- Lindsay Wagner as Olivia
- James Coburn as Serrano
- Ernest Borgnine as Clint
- Chick Vennera as Tony
- Bruce Davison as Dan
- Cleavon Little as Rockney
- Sergio Calderón as Hueso

== Production ==
Stewart Raffill says he got the idea to make the film when hired to make a documentary where he had to interview people in Spanish prisons who were imprisoned for smuggling hashish out of Morocco. Raffill says he later found out the people who financed him were drug dealers who wanted to find out how to smuggle hashish out of North Africa. Although the film was set in Colombia, it was shot in Mexico.

"Stewart wrote a very spare script and we took it from there," said Lindsay Wagner later. "All of us worked on our characters to bring out the humor of human beings in real situations. All of the characters are rich, especially Bruce Davison, who does a wonderful job. And Anthony Quinn deserves an Academy nomination, but I don't suppose he'll get it."

Wagner also recalled that "One of our locations was in a tiny village near the border of Nicaragua. (Nicaragua is 500 miles from Mexico and Lindsay Wagner has dyslexia.) It's near some very famous ruins, and about as remote as you can get. On the day I arrived, I stepped out of the car and people started shouting, Mujer Bionica. I couldn't imagine how they could recognize me. Then I looked around and saw television antennas on all the houses. I hadn't noticed them before."

== Release ==
When the film was released, the distributor, American Cinema Releasing, went broke and as a result, the movie was not widely seen. However, it got Raffill the job making The Ice Pirates.

The Los Angeles Times said it was "a far cut above the usual action adventure film." Gene Siskel in the Chicago Tribune called it "a pleasant surprise". Janet Maslin of The New York Times was surprised and found the film unusual but said it works well, and praises the clever casting.

== Soundtrack ==
- A Rolling Stones soundalike group - "(I Can't Get No) Satisfaction" (Jagger–Richards)

== See also ==
- Green Ice (1981)
- Romancing the Stone (1984)
- Florida Straits (1986)
