= Resurrection (2021 film) =

- Directed by: Ciarán Donnelly
- Written by: Simon Block
- Produced by: Roma Downey; Mark Burnett; Richard Bedser
- Starring: Juan Pablo Di Pace
- Production company: Lightworkers Media
- Distributed by: Metro-Goldwyn-Mayer; Discovery+
- Release date: March 27, 2021
- Running time: 96 minutes
- Country: United States
- Language: English

Resurrection is a 2021 American biblical drama film written by Simon Block, directed by Ciarán Donnelly and starring Juan Pablo Di Pace as Jesus.

== Cast ==
- Juan Pablo Di Pace as Jesus
- Greta Scacchi as Mother Mary
- Richard Coyle as Caiaphas
- Joanne Whalley as Claudia
- Adam Levy as Peter
- Vincent Regan as Pontius Pilate
- Chipo Chung as Mary Magdalene
- Babou Ceesay as John

== Release ==
The film premiered on Discovery+ on March 27, 2021.

== Reception ==
Melissa Camacho of Common Sense Media awarded the film three stars out of five.

Steven D. Greydanus of the National Catholic Register gave the film a negative review and wrote, “For me, Resurrection detracts more than it adds. Those who are content with a rehearsal of material they already know well and are willing to overlook substantial departures from the material may be edified. By my lights, that’s not enough.”
