= When the North Wind Blows =

- Directed by: Stewart Rafill
- Starring: Henry Brandon
- Distributed by: Sunn Classics Pictures
- Release date: 1974
- Country: United States
- Language: English

When the North Wind Blows is a 1974 American film written and directed by Stewart Raffill. It gave a rare lead role to Henry Brandon.

It was also known as The Snow Tiger.

== Cast ==
- Henry Brandon as Avakum
- Herbert Nelson as Boris
- Dan Haggerty as Tsezar
- Henry Olek as Ivan
- Sander Johnson as Peter
- Rex Holman as Sergei
- Dale Ishimoto as Yermak

== Production ==
The film was shot in Alberta, Canada.

== Reception ==
It was one of the most popular films at the British box office in 1977.
