= Kenneth Wannberg =

American composer and sound editor (1930–2022)

Kenneth Gail Wannberg (June 28, 1930 – January 27, 2022) was an American composer and sound editor. He worked extensively with the composer John Williams on some of the biggest box office films of all time. His music editing credits include Star Wars (George Lucas, 1977), Raiders of the Lost Ark (Steven Spielberg, 1981), JFK (Oliver Stone, 1991), Schindler's List (Spielberg, 1993), and Harry Potter and the Prisoner of Azkaban (Alfonso Cuarón, 2004). In 1986 Wannberg won an Emmy for his sound editing on Steven Spielberg's Amazing Stories series.

His film score compositions include The Tender Warrior (1971), The Great American Beauty Contest (1973), Lepke (1975), The Four Deuces (1975), Bittersweet Love (1976), The Late Show (1977), Tribute (1980), The Amateur (1981), Mother Lode (1982), Losin' It (1982), Draw! (1984), Blame It on Rio (1984) and The Philadelphia Experiment (1984).

Wannberg died on January 27, 2022, in Florence, Oregon, at the age of 91.
