= Napoleon and Samantha =

1972 American adventure drama film

- Theatrical release poster
- Directed by: Bernard McEveety
- Written by: Stewart Raffill
- Produced by: Winston Hibler
- Starring: Michael Douglas; Will Geer; Johnny Whitaker; Jodie Foster
- Cinematography: Monroe P. Askins
- Edited by: Robert Stafford
- Music by: Buddy Baker
- Production company: Walt Disney Productions
- Distributed by: Buena Vista Distribution
- Release date: July 5, 1972
- Running time: 91 minutes
- Country: United States
- Language: English

Napoleon and Samantha is a 1972 American adventure drama film directed by Bernard McEveety and written by Stewart Raffill. Filmed in and around John Day, Oregon, it stars Johnny Whitaker and Jodie Foster (in her feature film debut) in the title roles. The film was nominated for an Academy Award for Best Original Dramatic Score at the 45th Academy Awards.

== Plot ==
Eleven-year-old Napoleon Wilson lives with his grandfather Seth. He and Seth adopt a lion named Major when by chance they meet Dimitri, an old clown who cannot take him back to Europe. The old lion has bad teeth and only drinks milk so they put Major in the chicken cage to look after him. When Seth dies of old age, Napoleon asks a young grad student named Danny Williams to help bury his grandfather. Uncertain about his future, Napoleon runs off with the lion, a pet rooster, and his eight year old friend Samantha to try to find Danny, now a goat herder who lives in the mountains, and so Napoleon can avoid being sent to an orphanage.

Along their way, the two children encounter many dangers. Napoleon nearly falls off a cliff, but Major manages to pull him up with a rope. They have to cross a river which Major does not like, since most cats are afraid of water. A cougar attacks Napoleon's rooster, but Major easily defeats the much smaller cat and chases it up a tree. While Napoleon is out looking for wood he comes across an angry black bear that chases him back to where Samantha is resting with Major. At first, Major is too tired and wants to sleep while Samantha desperately tries to wake him. But as soon as the lion hears the roar of the bear, he stands up to challenge his opponent and protect the children. As the bear is much closer in size to Major than the cougar was, the two beasts fight hard but Major eventually gains the upper hand and the bear runs away.

Eventually the children find Danny's cabin and he takes them in with the hope of convincing Napoleon that orphanages really aren't that bad. Danny leaves the kids with a man named Mark Pierson and attempts to find Samantha's family to notify them, but he is arrested and accused of kidnapping the children. While at the police station, Danny notices a photo of Mark, who happens to be a dangerous psychopath, and he escapes to rescue them. He steals a motorcycle and the police chase him all the way back to his cabin, where they find and arrest the wanted man.

When things are back to normal, Napoleon takes Major and tries to run away again to live with the Indians, but Danny catches up. Danny explains that the Indians don't really live out in the wild anymore, and that Napoleon should give foster care a try, with a promise that Major could stay in the mountains and live with him. Napoleon agrees and they go back to Danny's cabin.

== Cast ==
- Johnny Whitaker as Napoleon Wilson
- Jodie Foster as Samantha
- Michael Douglas as Daniel Arlington Williams III
- Will Geer as Grandpa Seth Wilson
- Zamba as Major the Lion
- Arch Johnson as Chief of Police
- Henry Jones as Mr. Amos Gutteridge
- Vito Scotti as Dimitri the Clown
- John Crawford as Desk Sergeant
- Mary Wickes as Clerk
- Ellen Corby as Gertrude
- Rex Holman as Mark Pierson
- Claude Johnson as Gary
- John Lupton as Pete
- James MacDonald as the Bear and Major the Lion (Roaring)
- Billy De Wolfe as Man (Uncredited)

== Production ==
It was the second film written by Stewart Raffill, who was an animal supervisor-turned-writer-and-director. He sold the script to Disney and worked on the film as an animal supervisor and producer. The film was largely shot in John Day, Oregon.

Jodie Foster was mauled by a substitute lion used on the film set named Simba and still has scars on her back and stomach (Simba nearly mauled Bob Denver in the Gilligan's Island episode "Feed the Kitty", also as a stand-in for Zamba). "I was walking ahead of him. He was on an invisible leash, some piano wire. He got sick of me being slow, picked me up and held me sideways and shook me like a doll." "I was in shock and thought it was an earthquake. I turned around and saw the entire crew running off in the other direction. The trainer then said, 'Drop it' and he opened his mouth and dropped me." In response to claims that Zamba (the main lion in the movie) was involved in the mauling incident, Foster fiercely defended Zamba, insisting that the lion that attacked her was a substitute.

== See also ==
- Alaxander, Julia (2023-11-14). "Disney+ launch lineup: every movie and TV show available to stream in the US on day one". The Verge. Retrieved 13 February 2023.
- List of American films of 1972
