= The Philadelphia Experiment (film) =

1984 science fiction film directed by Stewart Raffill

- Theatrical release poster
- Directed by: Stewart Raffill
- Screenplay by: William Gray; Michael Janover
- Story by: Wallace C. Bennett; Don Jakoby
- Based on: The Philadelphia Experiment: Project Invisibility; 1979 book by Charles Berlitz; William L. Moore
- Produced by: Douglas Curtis; Joel B. Michaels
- Starring: Michael Paré; Nancy Allen; Eric Christmas; Bobby Di Cicco
- Cinematography: Dick Bush
- Edited by: Neil Travis
- Music by: Kenneth Wannberg
- Production company: Cinema Group
- Distributed by: New World Pictures
- Release date: August 3, 1984
- Running time: 102 minutes
- Country: United States
- Language: English
- Budget: $9 million
- Box office: $8,103,330

The Philadelphia Experiment is a 1984 American science fiction film. It is directed by Stewart Raffill, stars Michael Paré, Bobby Di Cicco, Kene Holliday and Nancy Allen and is based on the urban legend of the Philadelphia Experiment. In 1943, United States Navy sailors David Herdeg (Paré) and Jim Parker (Di Cicco) are thrown forward in time to the year 1984 when a scientific experiment being performed aboard the USS Eldridge suffers a catastrophe. The film follows the two men as they attempt to survive the future and race against time to put an end to the experiment that now threatens the fate of the entire world.

The film was released on August 3, 1984 by New World Pictures, and received mixed reviews from critics and only earned $8,103,330 against a budget of $9 million in the United States, but nonetheless proved to be successful for New World Pictures and led to the producer's decision to produce John Carpenter's Black Moon Rising.

== Plot ==
In 1943, United States Navy sailors David Herdeg and Jim Parker serve aboard destroyer escort USS Eldridge, docked in Philadelphia. Doctor James Longstreet and his team conduct an experiment to render the ship invisible to radar, but a malfunction causes the ship to disappear. David and Jim's attempts to stop the experiment fail and they jump overboard to escape.

They land during the night in a small town, which also disappears, leaving them marooned in a desert. Startled by the appearance of an unfamiliar aircraft (a helicopter), they flee and Jim is nearly electrocuted by an electric fence. Eventually, they find their way to a roadside diner. An energy discharge from Jim destroys two arcade games, forcing an altercation with the owner. Fleeing to the parking lot, they take a woman named Allison Hayes hostage and force her to drive them away. Confused by their surroundings, they are shocked when Allison tells them that the year is 1984. They are tracked and apprehended by the police. Jim, who is suffering increasingly severe seizures, is hospitalized before disappearing from his hospital bed in a flash of light. David and Allison then evade military police, who have arrived to take David into custody.

Learning that they are near Jim's birthplace, Santa Paula, California, David decides to try to find his family. Jim's wife Pamela, who is now a senior citizen, immediately recognizes David from 1943. She says that the Eldridge had reappeared minutes after disappearing. Jim had also returned and had been chastised and hospitalized after telling the truth about temporarily visiting 1984. David finds that he himself never returned. David sees an elderly Jim outside a window but Jim refuses to speak with him. As David and Allison leave, they see military police approaching and a high speed chase through Jim's ranch ensues. The two manage to elude them when the pursuing vehicle crashes and burns. From the burning wreck, David salvages documents mentioning Longstreet. Recognizing that Longstreet had been involved with the Philadelphia experiment in 1943, David decides to find him. As they spend time together, David and Allison fall in love.

In 1984, Longstreet has attempted to use the same technologies that were used in the Eldridge experiment to create a shield as protection from an ICBM attack. When the equipment was tested, the shielded town disappeared into "hyperspace". The scientists are unable to shut down the experiment, which has created a vortex that is drawing matter into it and causes extremely unstable and severe weather. Longstreet predicts that the vortex will continue to expand until the entire world is consumed. The scientists send a probe into the vortex and discover the Eldridge inside. They theorize that the two experiments have linked together with the generators on the Eldridge powering the vortex.

David captures Adjutant Andrews, an assistant at Longstreet's home and forces Andrews to take them onto the base. Longstreet explains the situation to David and tells him that, according to surviving sailors from the Eldridge, the ship returned to Philadelphia in 1943 after David shut down the generator. Longstreet says that David must go through the vortex to the Eldridge and terminate the experiment or the vortex will destroy the Earth.

David is outfitted with a protective suit to allow him to shut down the experiment and catapulted into the vortex. He lands on the deck of the Eldridge, where he finds crew members badly injured. He hurries to the generator room and smashes arrays of vacuum tubes using a firefighting axe. The generator shuts down and David looks for Jim. Assured that Jim is fine, David jumps over the side of the ship and disappears. Back in 1943, Longstreet and others watch the Eldridge reappear in Philadelphia, revealing crew members with severe burns, while others have been fused alive into the ship's hull. In 1984, the missing town reappears as Allison and David are reunited.

== Cast ==
- Michael Paré as David Herdeg
- Nancy Allen as Allison Hayes
- Eric Christmas as Dr. Jim Longstreet
  - Miles McNamara as Young Jim Longstreet
- Bobby Di Cicco as Jim Parker
  - Ralph Manza as Older Jim Parker
- Louise Latham as Pamela Parker
  - Debra Troyer as Young Pamela Parker
- Stephen Tobolowsky as Barney
- Kene Holliday as Major Clark
- Joe Dorsey as Sheriff Bates
- Michael Currie as Magnussen
- Gary Brockette as Adjutant Andrews
- James Edgcomb as Officer Boyer
- Glenn Morshower as Mechanic
- Rodney Saulsberry as Doctor
- Vaughn Armstrong as Cowboy

== Production ==
=== Development and writing ===
John Carpenter wrote an original draft. He called it a "great shaggy dog story. Absolute crap, but what a great story. While I was writing it, I couldn’t figure out the third act. A friend suggested the revenge of the crew against the people who put them there, but I thought it was too much like The Fog". Carpenter had originally intended the film to be his follow-up to The Fog, but abandoned pursuing it due to frustration with the lack of momentum it was getting. Producer Douglas Curtis acquired the rights to Carpenter's screenplay in 1981. Curtis thought that Carpenter's original idea of having the entire film being a period piece set entirely in 1943 would not be sustainable and had the script rewritten with the added element of introducing the protagonists during 1943 before being transported to present day. Production on the film was set to commence initially in April 1982, but stalled when Avco Embassy Pictures was sold. Afterwards Carpenter rejoined the project as an executive producer with the intention of providing input during post-production and helped set the film up at New World Pictures. Jonathan Kaplan was initially set to direct the film, but left and was replaced by Stewart Raffill.

Raffill says by the time he became involved with the film, the script had been rewritten nine times. He agreed to do the film, subject to the next rewrite which he thought was "terrible". The head of the studio agreed with Raffill's additions to the script, even though it was only three weeks before filming: "So, he asked if I had ever dictated a screenplay before. I told him I had not. Then he said, ‘Well, I’m gonna send someone to your house, a girl, every afternoon, and just dictate the story you told me and fill in the dialogue and we’ll make that.’ And I said, ‘Okay.’ So that's what I did."

Principal photography began on November 28, 1983. Parts of the film were shot in Salt Lake City and Wendover, Utah, Denver, Colorado, Santa Paula, California, and Charleston, South Carolina. The destroyer USS Laffey (DD-724), then on display at Patriots Point, represented USS Eldridge in the film. Other shooting locations included the John P. Grace Memorial Bridge, which was also known as the Cooper River Bridge in 1983, Charleston Harbor, the William Enston Home, Wendover Air Force Base, and the Bonneville Salt Flats.

== Reception ==
=== Critical response ===
On Rotten Tomatoes the film has an approval rating of 50% based on reviews from 10 critics. Metacritic, which uses a weighted average, assigned the film a score of 44 out of 100, based on 7 critics, indicating "mixed or average" reviews.

=== Accolades ===
- 1985, Nancy Allen was nominated by the Academy of Science Fiction, Fantasy and Horror Films for the Saturn Award for Best Actress at the 12th Saturn Awards.
- 1985, Stewart Raffill won the Best Film Award at Fantafestival.

== Sequel and remake ==
- A sequel called Philadelphia Experiment II, featuring a different cast and crew, was released in 1993.
- A made-for-television reconception of the original film was released in 2012 on SyFy. Michael Paré also appears in this version, but in a different role.
