= Gary Brockette =

American actor (1947–2010)

Gary "Tex" Brockette (September 13, 1947 – January 1, 2010) was an American actor, assistant director, writer and co-producer. He was born in Denton, Texas.

== Career ==
Gary Brockette began his career working as an actor in New York. He played the role of Bobby Sheen in 1971's The Last Picture Show and Frank Cameron in Encounter with the Unknown. He also appeared in the 1984 movies, The Philadelphia Experiment and The Ice Pirates. As a character actor, he made guest appearances on such television shows as Trapper John, M.D. and Charlie's Angels. He also wrote, directed, and edited a short film called Deceit in 2009.

Brockette was married to actress Sandra Brown who played Diane in the 1973 blaxploitation The Mack.

== Death ==
Gary Brockette died on January 1, 2010, from complications of cancer.

== Filmography ==
Year	Title	Role	Notes
1970	Mark of the Witch	Howard	
1971	The Last Picture Show	Bobby Sheen	
1972	Encounter with the Unknown	Frank Cameron	
1984	The Ice Pirates	Percy the Robot	
1984	The Philadelphia Experiment	Adjutant / Andrews	
1988	Mac and Me	Doctor #2	
1990	The Sleeping Car	Ghost Mister	
2003	Streets of Legend	Bob Smith	
2005	National Lampoon's Adam & Eve	Miles' Boss	
2005	Survival Island	Captain Richards	
2007	Sirens of the Caribbean	Gary	(final film role)
