= Deceit (2009 film) =

- Directed by: Gary Brockette
- Written by: Gary Brockette
- Produced by: Suzanne DeLaurentiis
- Starring: Robin W. Cho; Brian Jeffrey Hall; Marc Mazur; David B. Michaelson
- Cinematography: Michael T. Balog
- Edited by: Gary Brockette
- Distributed by: Suzanne DeLaurentiis Productions
- Release date: September 10, 2009 (Cinema City)
- Running time: 6 minutes
- Country: United States
- Language: English

Deceit is a 2009 American short film. The story takes place during the Vietnam War and revolves around a young girl and three soldiers trapped in a defensive fighting position. The film received the Audience Choice Award for Best Short Film at the 2009 Cinema City International Film Festival. It was also accepted by the SoCal Film Festival.
