= Dark Tourist =

2012 American psychological thriller film

- Movie poster
- Directed by: Suri Krishnamma
- Written by: Frank John Hughes
- Produced by: Zachery Ty Bryan; Adam Targum; Suzanne DeLaurentiis; Michael Cudlitz; Frank John Hughes
- Starring: Michael Cudlitz; Melanie Griffith; Pruitt Taylor Vince
- Cinematography: Ricardo Jacques Gale
- Edited by: Justin Guerrieri
- Music by: Austin Wintory
- Production company: Vision Entertainment Group
- Distributed by: Phase 4 Films
- Release date: July 3, 2012 (Filmfest München)
- Running time: 80 minutes
- Country: United States
- Language: English
- Budget: $1.5 million

Dark Tourist (also known as The Grief Tourist) is a 2012 American psychological thriller film directed by Suri Krishnamma, written by Frank John Hughes, and starring Michael Cudlitz, Melanie Griffith, and Pruitt Taylor Vince. Cudlitz plays a bisexual security guard who engages in dark tourism. It premiered at Filmfest München on July 3, 2012, and Phase 4 Films released it theatrically on August 23, 2013.

== Plot ==
Jim Tahna, a quiet and solitary man, explains in voice-over narration his hatred of society and his employers, though he enjoys his work as a security guard, as it allows him long periods of solitude. On his vacation time, he engages in dark tourism, the visitation of murder sites. His current subject is Carl Marznap, a mass murderer and arsonist. He leaves Yonkers, New York, to visit Carl's home in California. His neighbor at the cheap motel in which he stays, Iris, turns out to be a prostitute. Nervous, Jim fumbles in conversation with her, then states in voice-over how much he hates prostitutes. At a local restaurant, he meets Betsy, a friendly waitress. Jim introduces himself to her as Carl and falsely claims that his sister has been diagnosed with cancer. Betsy and Jim draw closer over their difficult lives, and she invites him to an Alcoholics Anonymous meeting.

On his tour of Marznap's home and crime scenes, Jim becomes increasingly disturbed by hallucinations and vague flashbacks. Eventually, Jim hallucinates or connects with the spirit of (it is left ambiguous) Marznap himself, who urges him to teach the world what it feels like to be a victim. Once tortured and gang-raped in juvenile detention, Marznap explains that he sought revenge by burning down a church, as he blamed those people for knowingly doing nothing to help him while his father abused him. After the Alcoholics Anonymous meeting, Jim and Betsy bond further, and Betsy invites him to dinner at her house. Betsy offers him marijuana, and he reluctantly accepts. When she tries to kiss him, he becomes agitated and demands that they have sex without any affection. When she asks him to slow down, he berates her and leaves. Marznap encourages him to visit Iris. A trans woman, Iris has anal sex with Jim that turns forced with Iris insulting him, and he flashbacks to a childhood gang rape.

Jim and Carl discuss their shared experiences, and Jim expresses his belief that he is broken beyond repair. The next day, at the restaurant, Betsy apologizes to Jim, and he calls her disgusting. She runs away crying, and Jim returns to his motel. Jim breaks into Iris' room, scares off her client, and beats her savagely. After he berates Iris, God, and the kids who raped him, he takes Iris to the church, where he strangles her. Marznap and Jim then discuss what to do next; Marznap counsels him to commit suicide, and Jim slits his own throat. In the epilogue, the police reveal that Jim has killed six trans-women prostitutes on his various dark tourism trips, and a young man visits Jim's house as part of his own dark tourism. Around a hole in the wall in Jim's house, a message reads, "From this void, no one returns!"

== Cast ==
- Michael Cudlitz as Jim Tahna
- Melanie Griffith as Betsy
- Pruitt Taylor Vince as Carl Marznap
- Suzanne Quast as Iris
- Brad Bufanda as Manny

== Production ==
Production was originally to take place in New Orleans but moved to Los Angeles after a money dispute. Cudlitz and Griffith were drawn to the film because of the writing.

== Release ==
Dark Tourist premiered at Filmfest München on July 3, 2012. It received a limited release in the United States on August 23, 2013. It was released on Blu-ray, DVD in the United States on February 25, 2014.

== Reception ==
Rotten Tomatoes, a review aggregator, reports that 33% of nine surveyed critics gave the film a positive review; the average rating was 4.7/10. Metacritic rated the film 40/100. Geoff Berkshire of Variety called it "a well-acted but rote and ultimately repellent character study". Karsten Kastelan of The Hollywood Reporter wrote that the film is unrelentingly dark, which makes it too uncomfortable to enjoy. Nicolas Rapold of The New York Times wrote that the film's mood is weakened by Vince's and Griffith's appearances, and the post-credits scene is "too clever by half". Annlee Ellingson of the Los Angeles Times criticized the film's pacing and called the climax "a grotesque, exploitive mess". Ernest Hardy of The Village Voice wrote that the film "veer[s] hard into cliché" but the actors give good performances. Gareth Jones of Dread Central rated it 1.5/5 stars and wrote, "What should be a deep and wounding trip to the edge of sanity remains far too understated and impenetrable for its own good." Becki Hawkes of Daily Dead rated it 4/5 stars and wrote, "There's an intense evocation of dread throughout: a crawling, fetid sense of evil, which some viewers may simply find too repellent to watch."
