= How Sweet It Is (2013 film) =

- Theatrical release poster
- Directed by: Brian Herzlinger
- Written by: Jay Black; Brian Herzlinger
- Produced by: Suzanne DeLaurentiis; Steven Chase; Matthew L. Weiner; Keith Weiner; Ivan Kavalsky; Rick Finklestein
- Starring: Joe Piscopo; Erika Christensen; Michael Paré; Erich Bergen; Paul Sorvino
- Cinematography: Akis Konstantakopoulos
- Edited by: Blake Barrie
- Music by: Matt Dahan
- Production companies: Winbrook Entertainment; Suzanne DeLaurentiis Productions; Factory Entertainment Group
- Distributed by: E-T Pictures
- Release date: May 10, 2013 (United States)
- Running time: 104 minutes
- Country: United States
- Language: English

How Sweet It Is is a 2013 American independent musical comedy-drama film directed by Brian Herzlinger and written by Herzlinger and Jay Black. The film stars Joe Piscopo, Erika Christensen, Erich Bergen, Michael Paré, and Paul Sorvino. It was released in select theaters in the United States on May 10, 2013.

== Plot ==
An alcoholic theater owner needs to put together a successful musical in order to pay off his mob debt, but problems arise when the wise guys want to cast their friends in the production.

== Cast ==
- Joe Piscopo as Jack Cosmo
- Erika Christensen as Sarah Cosmo
- Erich Bergen as Ethan Trimble
- Michael Paré as Mike
- Paul Sorvino as Big Mike
- Jonathan Slavin as Clifton
- Louis Lombardi as Wally
- Victoria Summer as Kristina
- Steven W. Bailey as Gregory
- Veronica De Laurentiis as Veronica

== Production ==
On May 2, 2012, it was announced that Erika Christensen, Paul Sorvino, and Joe Piscopo had joined the cast of the film. It was also announced that Burt Reynolds had joined the cast, but he later dropped out. Principal photography began in early May 2012 in Los Angeles, California.

== Reception ==
How Sweet It Is was panned by critics, receiving a 0% rating from 6 reviews on aggregator website Rotten Tomatoes. Rachel Saltz of The New York Times wrote: "Brian Herzlinger's How Sweet It Is, an ode to the healing powers of musical theater, misfires so badly at the beginning that it takes a while to notice when it goes from godawful to sweetly awful. Mr. Herzlinger, who wrote the script with Jay Black, comes out swinging, with cut-rate gags and unpleasant clichés, not to mention the treacly number that plays over the opening credits."

Amy Nicholson of Los Angeles Times also gave a negative review, writing: "Piscopo - one of the two break-out stars in the 1980s class of Saturday Night Live [the other was Eddie Murphy] – isn't just too good for this film, he's too good to be giving it this much effort." Chris Packham from The Village Voice wrote: "Like the climactic musical itself, the film pivots on silly people and absurd situations that demand total, unhinged commitment."
