= Heywood Gould =

American screenwriter

- Occupations: Film director, writer

Heywood Gould is an American screenwriter, journalist, novelist and film director. He wrote the screenplays for the films Rolling Thunder, The Boys from Brazil, Fort Apache, The Bronx, Streets of Gold, Cocktail, and wrote and directed the films One Good Cop, Trial by Jury, Mistrial and Double Bang.

== Career ==
In 2008 his novel Leading Lady was nominated for a Hammett Prize.

=== Rolling Thunder ===
On the strength of his spec screenplay Fort Apache, The Bronx (1981), Gould was enlisted by star William Devane to rewrite Paul Schrader's Rolling Thunder script. Gould added pop-psych monologues for Devane's character, a former POW, that reflected an almost clinical understanding of his own trauma. Devane opted instead for a terse, contained performance in the mold of Steve McQueen, forgoing Gould's ornate characterization. Only one Gould monologue remains in the film, and it contains the oft-quoted line "You learn to love the rope," a poignant reference to defying one's captors. Aborted monologues aside, Gould's changes to Schrader's script provide the most memorable scenes in the film. Moreover, Gould added flourishes that tied supporting characters more organically to the film's themes.

== Works ==
=== Novels ===
- One Dead Debutante (1976)
- Deadline For Murder (1977)
- Glitter Burn (1981)
- Fort Apache, The Bronx (1981) (from his screenplay)
- Cocktail (1984)
- Double Bang (1988)
- One Good Cop (1999)
- Leading Lady (2008)
- Serial Killers Daughter (2011)
- Green Light For Murder (2012)

=== Memoirs and non-fiction ===
- Sir Christopher Wren: Renaissance Architect, Philosopher, And Scientist (1970) (juvenile biography))
- Corporation Freak (1971) (nonfiction account of working at IBM's Advanced Systems Development Division in 1968)
- The Complete Book Of Camping (1972)
- Headaches And Health (1973)
- Drafted, A Memoir Of The ‘60’s (2021)

=== Screenplays ===
- Hazard’s People (1976) (made for TV)
- Dog And Cat (1977) (made for TV)
- Rolling Thunder (1977)
- Boys From Brazil (1978)
- Cocktail (1988)
- Fort Apache, The Bronx (1981)
- Streets Of Gold (1986)
- One Good Cop (1991) (plus director)
- Trial By Jury (1994) (plus director)
- Mistrial (1996) (made for TV, plus director)
- Double Bang (2001) (plus director)
