= Survival Island =

2005 film directed by Stewart Raffill

- Theatrical release poster
- Directed by: Stewart Raffill
- Written by: Stewart Raffill
- Produced by: Jimmy de Brabant; Michael Dounaev; Heinz Thym; Robert Velo; Albert Martinez-Martin
- Starring: Billy Zane; Kelly Brook; Juan Pablo Di Pace
- Cinematography: Tony Imi
- Edited by: Nick Rotundo
- Music by: Richard Harvey
- Production companies: Thema Production; T Films; Future Films
- Distributed by: Universal Pictures (United Kingdom, Brazil); Showtime Networks (United States)
- Release dates: 16 November 2005 (Australia); 5 May 2006 (United Kingdom)
- Running time: 95 minutes
- Countries: Luxembourg; United States; United Kingdom
- Language: English
- Budget: $9 million
- Box office: $558,764

Survival Island, also known as Three, is a 2005 erotic thriller survival film written and directed by Stewart Raffill and starring Billy Zane, Kelly Brook and Juan Pablo Di Pace.

== Plot ==
Jack and Jennifer are a wealthy couple who are yachting in the Caribbean during Christmas. One of their crew is the handsome Manuel, who is immediately found attractive by Jennifer and her friend Gail. Shortly after, Manuel is cursed by his angry ex-girlfriend Maria as he prepares to leave on the yacht. He is clearly bothered and has a difficult time fulfilling requests, particularly for Jack who becomes irritated. Manuel also begins to be infatuated with Jennifer after overhearing her having sex with Jack in their cabin. When Captain Richards confronts him, Manuel quits and throws down a rag as he storms out of the galley. The rag lands on a gas flame and causes the entire yacht to catch fire. Captain Richards is unable to control the blaze with a fire extinguisher so they abandon ship. Their lifeboats are capsized by a storm later that night and everyone becomes separated.

Washing up on a deserted island, Jennifer is completely alone until she sees the body of Captain Richards in the water. As she attempts to resuscitate him, Manuel appears and also unsuccessfully tries to revive him. They bury his body and under Manuel's guidance, set out to build a hut for shelter and find food. Two days later while fishing near a reef, Manuel finds Jack alive and brings him back to Jennifer and their hut. As he recovers, Jack confirms the death of Gail and their other friend Bill, leaving the three of them as the only survivors.

Although Jack is grateful at first, he eventually suspects Manuel of having desires on his wife and declares the man his enemy, promising to ruin his life once they get off the island. This puts Jennifer in the uncomfortable position of her loyalty to Jack conflicting with the realization that they both need Manuel's help to survive. A proud man, Jack insists that he can provide for them both, but it quickly becomes apparent that he cannot. Jack and Jennifer's relationship starts quickly deteriorating.

Jack steals Manuel's goggles to go fishing one day and when Manuel discovers this, he threatens to kill Jack. Jennifer attempts to get him to calm down. As the two exit the water after fighting, Manuel pins Jennifer down and starts to rape her as a way of getting revenge on Jack, but she soon stops resisting and falls for him, and they have sex. Afterwards, Jennifer feels remorse despite having enjoyed the encounter and Manuel confesses his love for her. When Jack returns, Jennifer accidentally hints at him what had happened and he furiously rejects her.

While fishing another day, Jack finds a boat on the ocean floor. He drags it to shore and attempts to repair it. That night, Manuel and Jennifer go for a midnight swim as Jack watches them from a distance. As they start having sex, she gives him the idea of stealing the boat while Jack is out fishing so they can get away together from the island. The following morning, they manage to steal the boat and sail, however they do not get far before the boat begins to sink and they realize that Jack's plan all along was for them to take the boat and drown. They are forced to swim back to the island and to Jack, who attacks the exhausted Manuel with a spear and kidnaps Jennifer. Manuel rescues her that night but gets wounded in the process and becomes sick.

The next day, Jack tracks down the pair and finds them on top of a branch of a tree. He throws one of his spears to a weakened Manuel, who loses his balance and falls to the ground. Before Jack could kill him, Jennifer pins Jack to the ground, attempting to kill him with his own knife. Manuel picks up a heavy rock with which to crush Jack but he loses his balance again and falls backward, impaling himself on one of Jack's spears. Simultaneously, Maria performs a voodoo ceremony and impales Manuel's effigy on a spike.

One year later, a yachting family drops anchor near the island and explores it, discovering Jennifer asleep in her hut. She, still somewhat distraught over Manuel's death, leaves with them, but does not mention that Jack, who she has been forced to live with and depend on since Manuel's death, is also on the island. Jack, who is fishing, sees her leaving on the yacht and calls out, but Jennifer, who had also stolen his lighter so he could not make any more fires, finally exacts revenge on him by ignoring him and the family inside the boat cannot hear him. Jack is abandoned on the island and his eventual fate is left ambiguous.

== Cast ==
- Billy Zane as Jack
- Kelly Brook as Jennifer
- Juan Pablo Di Pace as Manuel
- Maria Victoria Di Pace as Maria
- Todd Collins as Bill
- Gabrielle Jourdan as Gail
- Gary Brockette as Captain Richards
- Isabelle Constantini as Maggie Richards

== Production ==
Principal photography started in April 2004 at Eleuthera in the Bahamas and lasted for seven weeks. In 2005, Billy Zane and Kelly Brook unsuccessfully challenged the film's producers to remove Brook's nude scenes from the movie.

== Release ==
=== Theatrical ===
Survival Island went on limited theatrical release on 3 May 2006 in the United Kingdom before being released to DVD on 21 August 2006. The cinematic release lasted for just one week in many cinemas.

=== Home media ===
Survival Island was released on DVD in the United States on 15 August 2006. It was also released theatrically in a number of European countries under its original title, Three. Actors Billy Zane and Kelly Brook met during the course of filming in 2004 and later became engaged. In 2005, Zane and Brook challenged the film's producers to remove Brook's nude scenes from the movie, however, the eventual DVD release kept these scenes intact.

== Reception ==
=== Critical response ===
Survival Island received mostly negative reviews. On Rotten Tomatoes, the film has an approval rating of 17% based on reviews from six critics.

The relationships between the characters in the film were heavily criticised. The Daily Press called the film "Not the best retelling of the rich-poor love triangle..."

Three, as it was known in the UK, suffered from poor reviews, gaining a rare one-star rating on the BBC Movies website. Robert Hanks of The Independent said "[Three is] an unholy amalgam of Lord of the Flies, The Blue Lagoon and The Admirable Crichton ... At odd moments it rises to risibility, but mostly it is just dull". In a review for Empire, Adam Smith described the film as "appalling". Anna Smith of Time Out criticised the film's tone in her review saying, "the dramatic score and writhing sex scenes imply an erotic thriller, but the camera treats pneumatic Brook like the subject of a cheap porno and the plot bears little resemblance to either genre. As the survivors bicker and allegiances change, it's hard to fathom their motivation or to glean what allegiances we, the audience, are expected to make". Total Film rated it one star out of five, while Patrick Mullen of Medium gave the film a rating of 3/10.

=== Accolades ===
Wins

- Golden Trailer Awards: Golden Trailer – Trashiest (2006)
