= James Brolin =

American actor (born 1940)

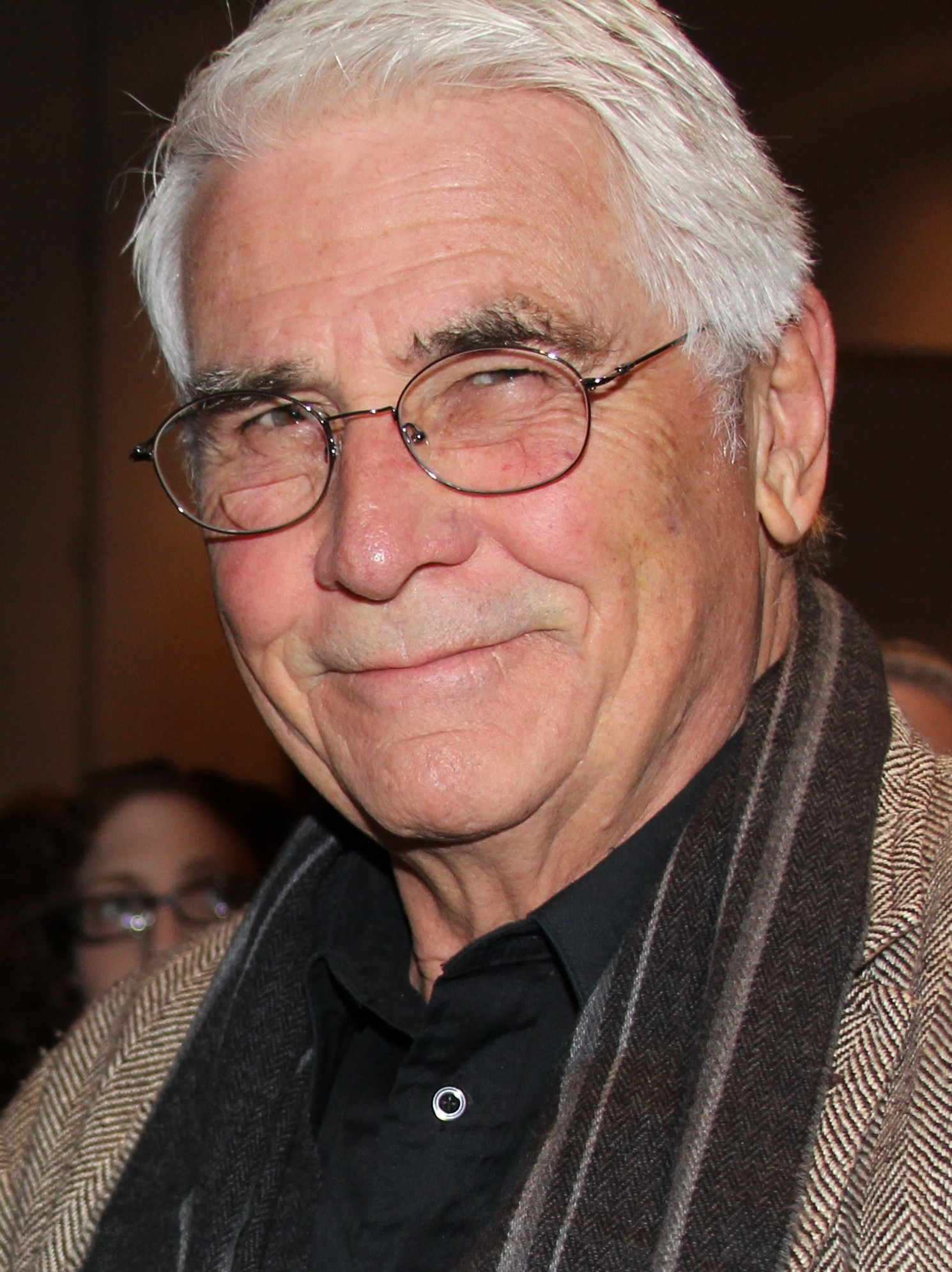
- Brolin in 2013
- Born: Craig Kenneth Bruderlin; July 18, 1940 (age 86); Los Angeles, California, U.S.
- Other name: Craig J. Brolin
- Education: Santa Monica City College; University of California, Los Angeles
- Occupation: Actor
- Years active: 1960–present
- Spouses: Jane Cameron Agee (m. 1966; div. 1984); Jan Smithers (m. 1986; div. 1995); Barbra Streisand (m. 1998)
- Children: 3, including Josh Brolin
- Relatives: Eden Brolin (granddaughter)
- Awards: Hollywood Walk of Fame

James Brolin (born Craig Kenneth Bruderlin; July 18, 1940) is an American actor. He has appeared in over 140 film and television productions since his debut in 1961 and is the recipient of two Golden Globe Awards and a Primetime Emmy Award.

Brolin is known for his TV roles such as Steven Kiley on Marcus Welby, M.D. (1969–76), Peter McDermott on Hotel (1983–88), LCol. Bill Kelly on Pensacola: Wings of Gold (1997–2000), John Short on Life in Pieces (2015–19), and the Narrator on Sweet Tooth (2021–24). His notable film roles include Sgt. Jerome K. Weber in Skyjacked (1972), John Blane in Westworld (1973), George Lutz in The Amityville Horror (1979), General Ralph Landry in Traffic (2000), Jack Barnes in Catch Me If You Can (2002), and the voice of Emperor Zurg in the Toy Story spin-off film Lightyear (2022).

For his contributions to the television industry, Brolin received a star on the Hollywood Walk of Fame on August 27, 1998. He is the father of actor Josh Brolin and the husband of Barbra Streisand.

== Early life ==
Brolin was born Craig Kenneth Bruderlin on July 18, 1940, in Westwood Village, Los Angeles, California. The eldest of two brothers and two sisters, he is the son of Helen Sue (née Mansur), a housewife, and Henry Hurst Bruderlin, a building contractor. As a young child, Brolin was interested in animals and in model airplanes, which he began building and flying when he was 10. As a teenage filmgoer in the mid-1950s, Brolin was particularly fascinated with actor James Dean, and he began shooting 8 mm films.

== Career ==
=== Early career ===
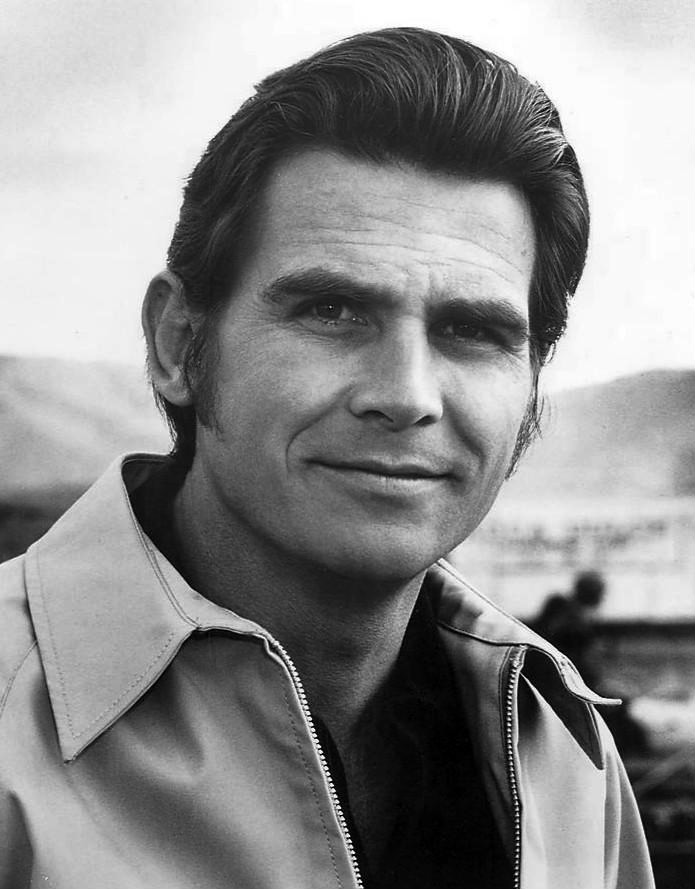
Brolin in 1974

Brolin attended Santa Monica City College and studied drama at the University of California Los Angeles before signing a contract with 20th Century Fox in 1960. At Fox, he started out as a contract player in Sandra Dee movies. Brolin appeared on an episode of Bus Stop in 1961. The part led to parts in other television productions such as Voyage to the Bottom of the Sea; Margie; Love, American Style; 12 O'Clock High; and The Long, Hot Summer. He made three guest appearances on the popular 1960s series Batman, alongside Adam West and Burt Ward, as well as roles in The Virginian, and Owen Marshall: Counselor at Law alongside Arthur Hill and Lee Majors. He also had a recurring role on the short-lived television series The Monroes.

At age 20, Brolin changed his surname from "Bruderlin" to "Brolin" to become James Brolin ("Bruder" is the German word for "brother"). Brolin also had small roles in several films including Take Her, She's Mine (1963), Dear Brigitte (1965), Von Ryan's Express (1965), and Fantastic Voyage (1966). The following year, his first big role was in The Cape Town Affair (1967), but it did not receive any success at the box office. Brolin was ultimately fired by 20th Century Fox. In 1969, he got his big break co-starring in the TV series Marcus Welby, M.D., with numerous awards kickstarting his film career.

=== Film ===
In the 1970s, Brolin was 6 feet 4 inches (1.93 m) and began appearing in leading roles in films, including Skyjacked (1972) and Westworld (1973). By the mid-1970s, he was a regular leading man in films, starring in Gable and Lombard (1976), The Car (1977), Capricorn One (1978, in which he costarred with Elliott Gould, Streisand's ex-husband), The Amityville Horror (1979), Night of the Juggler (1980), and High Risk (1981). When Roger Moore expressed his desire to vacate the role of James Bond, Brolin undertook screen tests to replace him in Octopussy (1983). It has been reported that not only were these successful, but Brolin was about to move to London to begin work on the film when the producers persuaded Moore to continue.

In 1985, Brolin parodied his near-hiring as James Bond in the film Pee-wee's Big Adventure.

=== Television ===
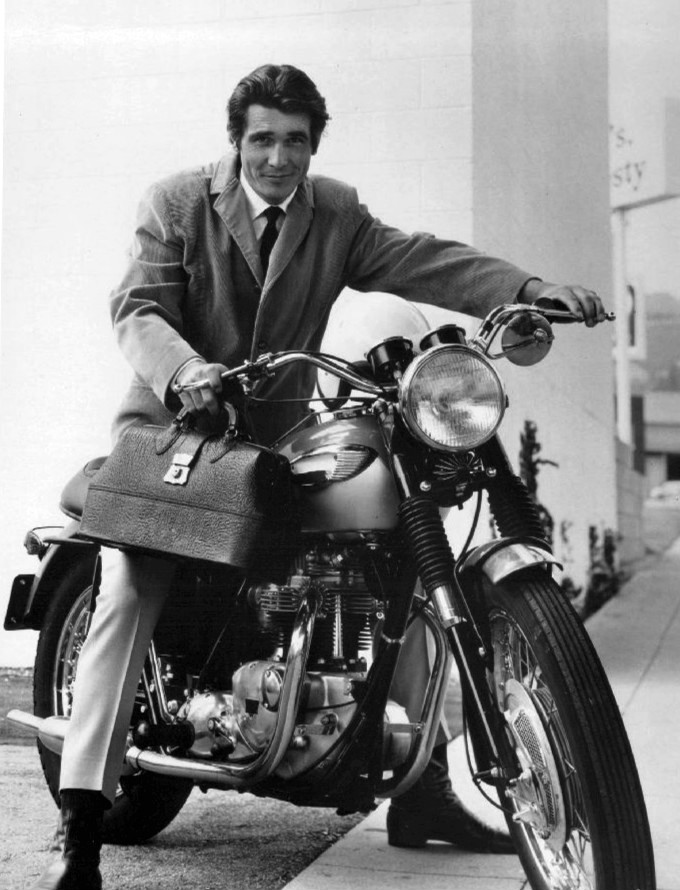
Brolin as Steven Kiley in Marcus Welby, M.D. (1969)

While contracted to Fox, Brolin had three small roles in the episodes "The Cat and the Fiddle", "The Catwoman Goeth", and "Ring Around the Riddler" in the television series Batman.

In 1968, Brolin transferred to Universal Studios, where he auditioned for a co-starring role opposite seasoned actor Robert Young in the popular medical drama Marcus Welby, M.D. (1969–1976). In its first season in 1970, Brolin won the Emmy Award for Outstanding Performance by an Actor in a Supporting Role and was subsequently nominated thrice more. He was also nominated for Golden Globes three times for Best Supporting Actor and won twice between 1971 and 1973. Brolin also starred in the television films Short Walk to Daylight (1972), on the television series Batman, and Trapped (1973). He and his first wife Jane also appeared on several episodes of the 1970s game show Tattletales.

In 1983, Brolin returned to television to star in another series and teamed with producer Aaron Spelling's prime-time soap opera, Hotel, for ABC. On Hotel, Brolin played Peter McDermott, a hotel manager. Brolin was nominated twice for Golden Globes between 1983 and 1984 for Best Performance By an Actor in a TV Series but lost both times. He would also eventually serve as a director for the show.

As the new decade approached, Brolin starred in both Angel Falls, for CBS and Extreme,

In 1997, Brolin's luck changed with the syndicated television series Pensacola: Wings of Gold. He played the role of Lt. Col. Bill "Raven" Kelly, whose job was to teach young Marines in a special unit, before being promoted to work with a group of talented Marine fighter pilots. For 4 years, 66 episodes in total, Brolin served as an executive producer and director on the series.

In 1997, Brolin also hosted Beyond Belief: Fact or Fiction. That same year, Brolin guest-starred on Roseanne.

=== Since 2000 ===
Brolin played General Ralph Landry, outgoing director of the Office of National Drug Control Policy in Steven Soderbergh's Oscar-winning Traffic (2000); as Jack Barnes in Steven Spielberg's Catch Me If You Can (2002); a minor role in the 2003 comedy A Guy Thing; as philandering husband Robert Hatch in the 2006 comedy The Alibi (released in the UK as Lies and Alibis); as Jack Jennings in the 2007 film The American Standards; as TV network anchor Frank Harris in Richard Shepard's The Hunting Party (2007); and starred alongside Emma Thompson and Dustin Hoffman in Joel Hopkins' 2008 film Last Chance Harvey (2008).

In 2002, Brolin played Governor Robert Ritchie of Florida, the Republican nominee running against President Jed Bartlet, on the TV series The West Wing.

In late 2003, Brolin portrayed Ronald Reagan in the television film The Reagans. The film was originally meant to air on CBS, but after creative differences, scripts controversies, and rising costs, CBS passed on the film, and it aired on cable channel Showtime, also owned by Viacom. The role earned Brolin his fifth Emmy Award nomination, as well as his fifth Golden Globe nomination.

In 2005, Brolin guest starred as casino owner Daniel Thorn in the TV series Monk. In 2006, Brolin appeared in the A&E Network film Wedding Wars, playing an anti-gay marriage governor. In 2008, Brolin guest starred on Law & Order: SVU as astronaut Col. Dick Finley. The same year, Brolin also starred in the lead role in the Sci-Fi Channel film Lost City Raiders.

Brolin appeared in the 2009 comedy film The Goods: Live Hard, Sell Hard. He also appeared in a 2009 episode of Psych, titled "High Noon-ish", where Brolin played the sheriff of a tourist-attracting "Wild West" town. The episode was in part a parody of the 1973 film Westworld, in which he had starred.

Brolin has played Richard Castle's mysterious father in two episodes of ABC's Castle, (2013-2014). He appeared as William Winger, Jeff Winger's estranged father, in the NBC sitcom Community.

From 2015 until 2019, Brolin played the role of John, the family patriarch, in the CBS comedy Life in Pieces.

In his first role in an animated film, Brolin portrayed Emperor Zurg in the 2022 Toy Story spin-off film Lightyear.

== Personal life ==
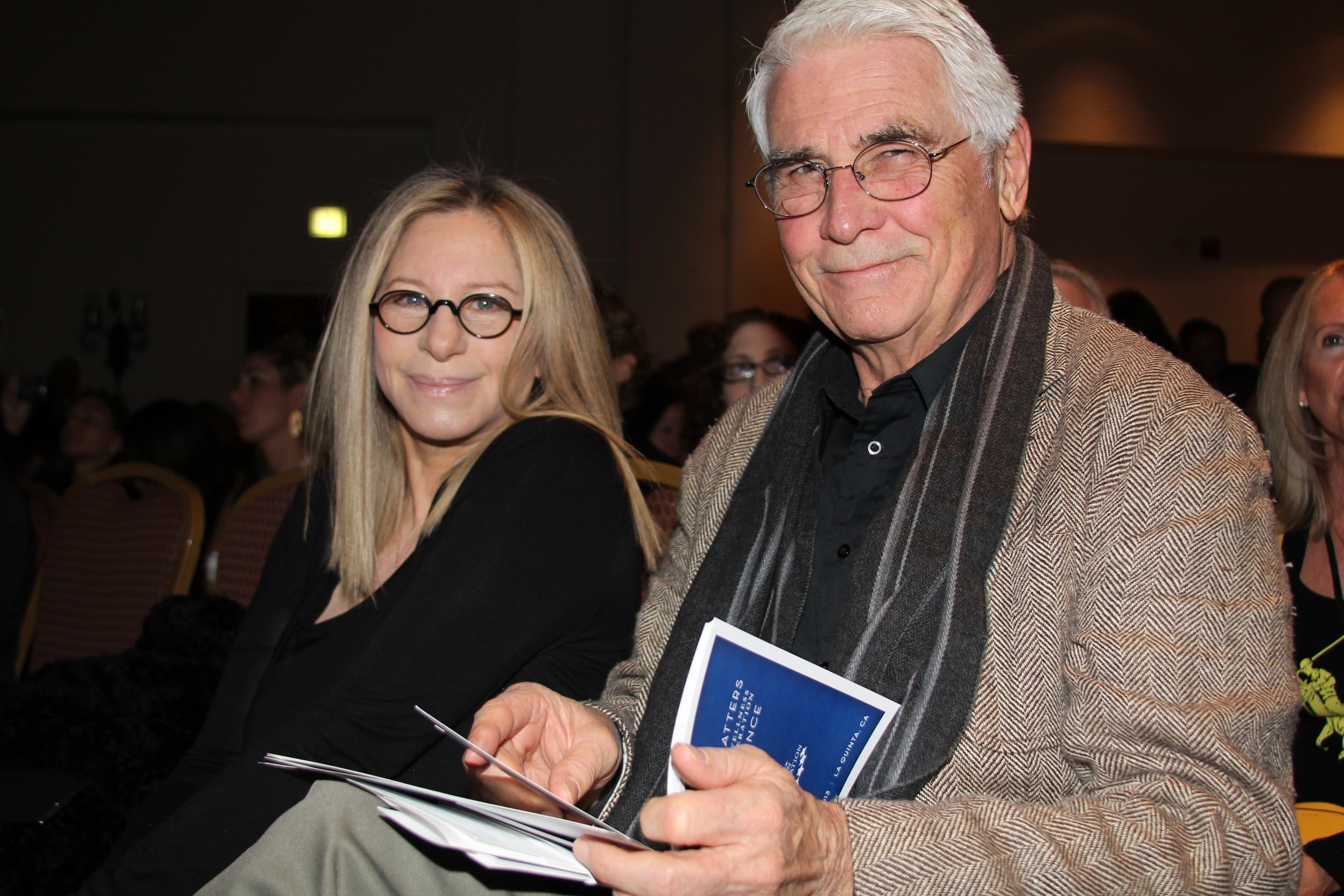
Brolin with Barbra Streisand (2013)

Brolin has been married three times and has three children. In 1966, Brolin married Jane Cameron Agee, a wildlife activist and aspiring actress at Twentieth Century Fox, 12 days after they first met. The couple had their first child, Josh, in 1968, and a second child in 1972. They were divorced in 1984. Josh said on the October 14, 2008, episode of the Late Show with David Letterman that his parents met on the TV series Batman, where his mother was assistant casting director.

In the late 1970s, Brolin started a brief but relatively successful career in sports car racing. After success in several celebrity auto races, he entered the 1979 24 Hours Nürburgring as part of the AMC Spirit team. Brolin's two-car team, which included accomplished racer Lyn St. James, finished both first and second in class.

In 1985, Brolin met actress Jan Smithers on the set of Hotel, and they married in 1986. The couple had a daughter in 1987. They divorced in 1995.

In 1996, Brolin met Barbra Streisand through a friend, and they got married on July 1, 1998.

== Filmography ==
=== Film ===
| Year | Title | Role | Notes |
|---|---|---|---|
| 1963 | Take Her, She's Mine | Mel | Uncredited |
| 1965 | Dear Brigitte | Student | Uncredited |
| 1965 | Von Ryan's Express | Private Ames | |
| 1966 | Our Man Flint | GALAXY technician | Uncredited |
| 1966 | Fantastic Voyage | Technician | |
| 1966 | Way...Way Out | Ted Robertson | |
| 1967 | The Cape Town Affair | Skip McCoy | |
| 1968 | The Boston Strangler | Detective Sgt. Phil Lisi | |
| 1972 | Skyjacked | Sgt. Jerome K. Weber | |
| 1973 | Westworld | John Blane | |
| 1976 | Gable and Lombard | Clark Gable | |
| 1977 | The Car | Captain Wade Parent | |
| 1977 | Capricorn One | Colonel Charles Brubaker | |
| 1979 | The Amityville Horror | George Lutz | |
| 1980 | Night of the Juggler | Sean Boyd | |
| 1981 | High Risk | Stone | |
| 1982 | Evergreen Trailride | Narrator | |
| 1985 | Pee-wee's Big Adventure | P.W. Herman | Cameo appearance |
| 1987 | Deep Dark Secrets | Michael Wakefield | |
| 1989 | Voice of the Heart | Victor Mason | |
| 1990 | Bad Jim | B. D. Sweetman | |
| 1991 | Ted & Venus | Max Waters | |
| 1992 | Gas Food Lodging | John Evans | |
| 1993 | Paper Hearts | Henry | |
| 1994 | The Visual Bible: Acts | Simon Peter | |
| 1997 | My Brother's War | John Hall | Also director |
| 1997 | Goodbye America | Ed Johnson | |
| 1998 | A Marriage of Convenience | Manson | |
| 2000 | Traffic | General Ralph Landry | |
| 2002 | Catch Me If You Can | Jack Barnes | |
| 2002 | The Master of Disguise | Fabbrizio Disguisey | |
| 2003 | A Guy Thing | Ken Cooper | |
| 2006 | The Alibi | Robert Hatch | |
| 2007 | The American Standards | Jack Jennings | |
| 2007 | The Hunting Party | Franklin Harris | |
| 2007 | Bad Girl Island | Terry Bamba | |
| 2008 | Last Chance Harvey | Brian | |
| 2009 | The Goods: Live Hard, Sell Hard | Ben Selleck | |
| 2009 | Bitter/Sweet | Calvert Jenkins | |
| 2010 | Burlesque | Mr. Anderson | |
| 2010 | Standing Ovation | | Also producer |
| 2011 | Last Will | Det. Sloan | |
| 2011 | A Fonder Heart | Craig | |
| 2011 | Love, Wedding, Marriage | Bradley | |
| 2014 | Elsa & Fred | Max Hayes | |
| 2015 | Accidental Love | Senator Bramen | |
| 2015 | The Steps | Ed | |
| 2015 | The 33 | Jeff Hart | |
| 2015 | Sisters | Bucky Ellis | |
| 2019 | Being Rose | Max | |
| 2022 | Lightyear | Zurg / Old Buzz Lightyear | Voice |

=== Television ===
| Year | Title | Role | Notes |
|---|---|---|---|
| 1961 | Follow the Sun | Teenager | Episode: "The Highest Wall" |
| 1961 | Bus Stop | Unknown | Episode: "The Resurrection of Annie Ahearn" |
| 1962 | Margie | Freddie Coates | Episode: "Madame President" |
| 1964–1965 | Valentine's Day | Harry / Charles "Charlie" Falwell Jr. | Episodes: "The Seasick Sailor" and "Two Weeks with Pay" |
| 1965 | Voyage to the Bottom of the Sea | Spencer | Episode: "The Saboteur" |
| 1965 | The Patty Duke Show | Hank | Episode: "Patty Meets the Great Outdoors" |
| 1965 | Daniel Boone | Member of the Lost Colony, Mark | Episode: "The Lost Colony" |
| 1966–1967 | The Monroes | Dalton Wales | 4 episodes |
| 1966–1967 | Batman | Various | 3 episodes |
| 1969 | The Virginian | Ned Trumbull | Episode: "Crime Wave in Buffalo Springs" |
| 1969–1976 | Marcus Welby, M.D. | Steven Kiley | 172 episodes |
| 1972 | Owen Marshall, Counselor at Law | Zack Jamison | Episode: "Shine a Light on Me" |
| 1972 | Short Walk to Daylight | Tom Phelan | ABC Movie of the Week |
| 1973 | Class of '63 | Joe Hart | ABC Movie of the Week |
| 1973 | Trapped | Chuck Brenner | ABC Movie of the Week |
| 1974 | Owen Marshall, Counselor at Law | Steven Kiley | Episode: "I've Promised You a Father, Part 2" |
| 1978 | Steel Cowboy | Clayton Ray Dennis | Television movie |
| 1982 | The Ambush Murders | Paul Marshall | Television movie |
| 1982 | Mae West | Jim Timony | Television movie |
| 1983 | White Water Rebels | Mike McKay | Television movie |
| 1983 | Cowboy | Ward McNally | Television movie |
| 1983–1988 | Hotel | Peter McDermott | 115 episodes |
| 1986–1987 | Hold the Dream | Ross Nelson | TV mini series |
| 1989 | Finish Line | Martin Shrevelow | Television movie |
| 1990 | Nightmare on the 13th Floor | Alan Lanier | Television movie |
| 1990 | The Earth Day Special | Doctor | Television special |
| 1991 | And the Sea Will Tell | Mac Graham | Television movie |
| 1992 | City Boy | Tom McLean | Television movie |
| 1993 | Gunsmoke: The Long Ride | John Parsley | Television movie |
| 1993 | Visions of Murder | Hal | Television movie |
| 1994 | A Perry Mason Mystery: The Case of the Grimacing Governor | Governor Ryan Allison | Television movie |
| 1994 | Parallel Lives | Nick Dimas | Television movie |
| 1995 | Extreme | Reese Wheeler | 7 episodes |
| 1996 | Hart to Hart: Harts in High Season | Elliot | Television movie |
| 1997 | Roseanne | Edgar Wellman, Jr. | 2 episodes |
| 1997 | Beyond Belief: Fact or Fiction | Host | 6 episodes |
| 1997–2000 | Pensacola: Wings of Gold | Lt. Colonel Bill Kelly | 66 episodes |
| 1998 | A Marriage of Convenience | Mason Whitney | Television movie |
| 1999 | To Love, Honor & Betray | Ted Brennan | Television film |
| 2002 | The West Wing | Governor Robert Ritchie | 2 episodes |
| 2003 | The Reagans | Ronald Reagan | Television movie |
| 2005 | Monk | Daniel Thorn | Episode: "Mr. Monk Goes to Vegas" |
| 2005 | Widow on the Hill | Hank Cavanaugh | Television movie |
| 2008 | Law & Order: Special Victims Unit | Colonel Richard Finley | Episode: "Lunacy" |
| 2008 | Lost City Raiders | John Kubiak | Television movie |
| 2009 | Psych | Sheriff Hank Mendel | Episode: "High Noon-ish" |
| 2010 | Blackout | Terrance Danfield | 3 episodes |
| 2013–16 | Castle | Jackson Hunt | 2 episodes |
| 2013 | Community | William Winger | Episode: "Cooperative Escapism in Familial Relations" |
| 2013 | Christmas with Tucker | Bo McCray | Television movie |
| 2014 | When Calls the Heart | Circuit Judge Jedidiah Black | Episode: "Prelude to a Kiss" |
| 2015–2019 | Life in Pieces | John Short | 79 episodes |
| 2016 | I'll Be Home For Christmas | Jack Foster | Television movie (also executive producer & director) |
| 2017 | Royal Hearts | Hank Pavlik | Television movie (also director) |
| 2021–2024 | Sweet Tooth | Narrator (Older Gus) | Voice; Netflix TV series |
| 2025–present | Ransom Canyon | Cap Fuller | |

== Awards and nominations ==
| Award/Organization | Year | Category | Work | Result | Ref. |
|---|---|---|---|---|---|
| Golden Globe Awards | 1971 | Best Supporting Actor – Series, Miniseries or Television Film | Marcus Welby, M.D. | Won | |
| Golden Globe Awards | 1972 | Best Supporting Actor – Series, Miniseries or Television Film | Marcus Welby, M.D. | Nominated | |
| Golden Globe Awards | 1973 | Best Supporting Actor – Series, Miniseries or Television Film | Marcus Welby, M.D. | Won | |
| Golden Globe Awards | 1984 | Best Actor – TV Series Drama | Hotel | Nominated | |
| Golden Globe Awards | 1985 | Best Actor – TV Series Drama | Hotel | Nominated | |
| Golden Globe Awards | 2004 | Best Actor – Miniseries or TV Film | The Reagans | Nominated | |
| Primetime Emmy Awards | 1970 | Primetime Emmy Award for Outstanding Supporting Actor in a Drama Series | Marcus Welby, M.D. | Won | |
| Primetime Emmy Awards | 1971 | Primetime Emmy Award for Outstanding Supporting Actor in a Drama Series | Marcus Welby, M.D. | Nominated | |
| Primetime Emmy Awards | 1972 | Primetime Emmy Award for Outstanding Supporting Actor in a Drama Series | Marcus Welby, M.D. | Nominated | |
| Primetime Emmy Awards | 1973 | Primetime Emmy Award for Outstanding Supporting Actor in a Drama Series | Marcus Welby, M.D. | Nominated | |
| Primetime Emmy Awards | 2004 | Outstanding Lead Actor in a Limited or Anthology Series or Movie | Ronald Reagan in The Reagans | Nominated | |
