= Stewart Raffill =

British writer and director

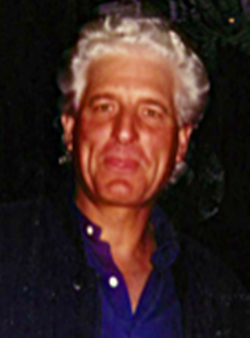
- Raffill in 2014.

Stewart Raffill is a British writer and director.

== Biography ==
Raffill was born in England and grew up near Stratford before immigrating to the US and working in the motion picture industry. His writing and directing work in film and TV spans several genres including science fiction, family, comedy and drama.

=== Film ===
Raffill made his feature debut as director with The Tender Warrior, starring Dan Haggerty and sold to Warner Brothers. It was filmed on location in Okefenokee Swamp in Georgia.

He sold his next script, Napoleon and Samantha, to Disney. Raffill also worked on the film as a producer. The film starred Jodie Foster and Michael Douglas.

He wrote and directed When the North Wind Blows.

Raffill wrote and directed The Adventures of the Wilderness Family with Robert Logan, leading to two sequels.

He followed it with two films with Logan, Across the Great Divide and The Sea Gypsies.

Raffill wrote and directed High Risk, shot in Mexico, starring James Brolin which he later described as a personal favorite. The film got him the job of writing and directing The Ice Pirates, made for John Forman and David Begelman at MGM.

Raffill directed and did uncredited writing on The Philadelphia Experiment which won Best Science Fiction Film at the Rome Film Festival.

Raffill directed and wrote Mac and Me, made to provide royalties to the McDonald's Foundation and starring Jade Calegory, who had spina bifida. The film is frequently cited as one of the worst ever made, but it later attained cult status and was re-released in 2019.

Begelmen hired Raffill to direct Mannequin Two: On the Move. Raffill wrote the original screenplay for Passenger 57.

Raffill wrote and directed Lost in Africa made for the Tusk charity. He also wrote and directed Tammy and the T-Rex, which starred Paul Walker, Denise Richards and Terry Kiser, which was re-released in 2019 and was the official selection for the Fantastic Fest and premiered at Beyond Fest. It was also featured in its entirety in the 2022 comedic video game, High on Life.

Other credits include A Month of Sundays, starring Rod Steiger, Sal Sapienza and Dee Wallace Stone; Survival Island, starring Billy Zane and Juan Pablo DiPace; Mysterious; and the family musical Standing Ovation.

=== Television ===
He moved into directing for TV with The New Adventures of Robin Hood and the TV movie The New Swiss Family Robinson with Jane Seymour and David Carradine, which he also wrote. He directed Grizzly Falls that won the Heartland Award and starred Bryan Brown.

Raffill directed episodes of Pensacola: Wings of Gold and 18 Wheels of Justice, and the TV movie Croc (2007).

== Filmography ==
Film

Year	Title	Director	Writer	Notes
1971	The Tender Warrior	Yes	Yes	
1972	Napoleon and Samantha	No	Yes	National Association of Theatre Owners Movie of the Month
1974	Snow Tigers (aka When the North Wind Blows)	Yes	Yes	
1975	The Adventures of the Wilderness Family	Yes	Yes	
1976	Across the Great Divide	Yes	Yes	
1978	The Sea Gypsies	Yes	Yes	
1981	High Risk	Yes	No	
1984	The Philadelphia Experiment	Yes	No	
1984	The Ice Pirates	Yes	Yes	
1988	Mac and Me	Yes	Yes	
1991	Mannequin Two: On the Move	Yes	No	
1992	Passenger 57	No	Yes	
1994	Tammy and the T-Rex	Yes	Yes	
1994	Lost in Africa	Yes	Yes	
1998	The New Swiss Family Robinson	Yes	Yes	
1999	Grizzly Falls	Yes	No	
2001	A Month of Sundays	Yes	No	
2002	While You Were Waiting	Yes	No	
2006	Survival Island	Yes	Yes	
2007	Croc	Yes	No	TV movie
2007	Sirens of the Caribbean	Yes	Yes	
2010	Standing Ovation	Yes	Yes	

Television

Year	Title	Episodes
1999–2000	Pensacola: Wings of Gold	"True Stories" "A Wing and a Prayer" "Cuba Libre" "Busted"
2000–2001	18 Wheels of Justice	"Two Eyes for an Eye" "Through a Glass, Darkly" "A Place Called Defiance" "Hot Cars, Fast Women" "Dance with the Devil"

== Awards and nominations ==
Year	Title	Award
1976	Across the Great Divide	Outstanding Merit Award - So. California Motion Picture Council
1978	The Sea Gypsies	Film Advisory Board Award of Excellence
1984	The Philadelphia Experiment	Best Science Fiction Rome International Film Festival; Fantafestival Award for Best Film
1988	Mac and Me	Golden Raspberry Award for Worst Director (Tied with Blake Edwards of Sunset); Nominated—Golden Raspberry Award for Worst Screenplay (with Steve Feke)
1999	Grizzly Falls	Award of Excellence Winner - Heartland Film Festival; Marco Island Film Festival - Audience Winner; Golden Reel Award Nominee
2001	A Month of Sundays	Feature Film Award for Best Actor - Rod Steiger - 2001 New York International Independent Film and Video Festival; Winner - Best of the Festival - Feature Film - Stewart Raffil - 2002 Atlantic City Film Festival
2002	While You Were Waiting	Silver Award for Dramatic Short Atlantic City Film Festival
2010	Standing Ovation	Official Selection - May Film Festival 2011
