= Rex Holman =

American film and television actor (1935–2025)

- Holman in Land of the Giants, 1969
- Born: Roy Eugene Baker; December 11, 1935; Tulsa, Oklahoma, U.S.
- Died: January 9, 2025 (aged 89)
- Occupation: Actor
- Years active: 1959–1989

Roy Eugene Baker (December 11, 1935 – January 9, 2025), known professionally as Rex Holman, was an American film and television actor.

== Life and career ==
Holman was born in Tulsa, Oklahoma. He began his screen career in 1959, appearing in the CBS anthology television series The Millionaire. In 1960, he appeared in the film Ma Barker's Killer Brood. He then made numerous guest-starring appearances in the western television series Gunsmoke, his first appearance being in the episode "Small Water".

Holman guest-starred in television programs, including Bonanza, Tales of Wells Fargo, Rawhide, The Virginian, Mission: Impossible, Mannix, The Twilight Zone, Land of the Giants, The Big Valley, Have Gun Will Travel, The Deputy, The Fall Guy, The Streets of San Francisco, Wagon Train, The Rifleman, Death Valley Days, Daniel Boone, Lawman, and Star Trek (as Wyatt Earp's ghost brother Morgan Earp), and played the recurring role of India in the NBC western television series The Road West. He also appeared in numerous films such as The Hindenburg, Young Jesse James, The Quick Gun, The Outlaws Is Coming, The Oscar, The Wrecking Crew, When the North Wind Blows, The Cool Ones, Joy in the Morning, Your Cheatin' Heart, Ride a Northbound Horse, and Escape to Witch Mountain.

Holman retired from acting in 1989, last appearing in the film Star Trek V: The Final Frontier.

== Death ==
Holman died on January 9, 2025, at the age of 89.
