= Double Bang =

2001 film by Heywood Gould

- Home video cover art
- Directed by: Heywood Gould
- Written by: Heywood Gould
- Produced by: Alan B. Bursteen; Michael P. Flannigan; Yoram Pelman; Marc Schaberg; Roee Sharon
- Starring: William Baldwin; Jon Seda; Adam Baldwin; Elizabeth Mitchell; Richard Portnow
- Cinematography: David Rush Morrison
- Edited by: Joel Goodman
- Music by: John Leftwich
- Distributed by: Artisan Entertainment
- Release date: August 17, 2001
- Running time: 99 minutes
- Country: United States
- Language: English
- Budget: $6 million

Double Bang is a 2001 American dramatic film starring William Baldwin, Jon Seda, and Adam Baldwin, The film was written and directed by Heywood Gould.

== Plot ==
A policeman's corrupt partner is killed by a hitman. The policeman gets involved with the criminal gang responsible for the killing in order to seek revenge and to bring down the gang's boss.

== Production ==
In July 1998, it was announced Norah Films' producer Roee Sharon and writer/director Heywood Gould of Tolmitch Prods. had partnered to form Tolmitch/Norah Films to co-produce a slate of films budgeted under $10 million. The company’s first announced project was an adaptation of Gould’s 1988 novel Double Bang about an honest cop who reluctantly enters the world of corruption and murder when his partner is killed by a small-time mobster.
