= Trial by Jury (film) =

- Theatrical release poster
- Directed by: Heywood Gould
- Written by: Jordan Katz; Heywood Gould
- Produced by: James G. Robinson; Chris Meledandri; Mark Gordon
- Starring: Joanne Whalley-Kilmer; Armand Assante; Gabriel Byrne; William Hurt
- Cinematography: Frederick Elmes
- Edited by: Joel Goodman
- Music by: Terence Blanchard
- Production companies: Morgan Creek Productions; Chris Meledandri Productions
- Distributed by: Warner Bros.
- Release date: September 9, 1994
- Running time: 107 minutes
- Country: United States
- Language: English
- Box office: $6.9 million

Trial by Jury is a 1994 American legal thriller film directed by Heywood Gould and starring Joanne Whalley-Kilmer, Gabriel Byrne, Armand Assante and William Hurt.

== Plot ==
Crime boss Rusty Pirone is about to stand trial again and Daniel Graham of the district attorney's office is determined this time to put him behind bars.

Pirone sends one of his henchmen, a burned-out former corrupt cop named Tommy Vesey, to find a way to get him off the charges. Vesey realizes that a hung jury will lead to an acquittal and he investigates all of the jurors with a view to blackmailing them. Unsuccessful in his blackmail investigation, he switches his attention to finding a juror that can be forced to work with him. He identifies single mother Valerie Alston, who he feels could make a difference in the jury room, but can also follow orders. Vesey warns Valerie that unless she cooperates, the Pirone family will kill her son and her elderly father.

Meanwhile, Graham's key witness dies before making it to court. He sets his investigator John Boyle the task of finding a new witness. First to testify is Hughie Bonner, a former henchman of Rusty's. He identifies Rusty as a key underworld figure, but is easily antagonized by Rusty's lawyer Leo Greco and lunges at Rusty, startling the jury. Greco calls out that Bonner is subject to a deal by Graham and his evidence is tainted because he is a convicted murderer. With no other choice, Graham and Boyle try to convince Rusty's uncle Johnny Verona to testify. Boyle finds video evidence of Johnny with another inmate in an intimate position in prison, indicating Johnny may be gay. Graham pressurizes Johnny to do the right thing or risk being outed. With no other choice, Johnny agrees and testifies against Rusty, linking him to the murders and seemingly sealing Rusty's fate.

Valerie attempts multiple times during the trial to find a way out of her predicament, but is stopped each time by Vesey. Rusty eventually breaks into her apartment and threatens her and her family. With no other options available, Valerie reluctantly complies. When the jury moves to deliberation, the eleven other jurors vote guilty while Valerie holds out. She incurs the wrath of many of them, who feel Pirone's guilt is obvious. She manipulates the deliberation procedure to highlight perceived discrepancies in Graham's case turning the jury against one another and against her. One by one, three of the jury members decide to vote her way.

Pirone goes free. Graham is furious and unable to believe he could lose an open-and-shut case. He tasks Boyle with finding out what went wrong. Boyle poles each of the jurors who found Rusty not guilty and they each call out Valerie's role in convincing them to change their verdict. Graham suspecting that Valerie may have been tampered with, meets with her discretely and tries to pressure her. Valerie adamantly denies any wrongdoing.

Pirone now free is worried that Valerie will eventually turn on him and he tasks Vesey and some thugs with monitoring her. Vesey though has fallen for the innocent Valerie and tries to protect her. However, after Graham is seen leaving her apartment, Rusty panics and orders a hit on her.

Valerie is kidnapped in broad daylight by three of Rusty's thugs and thrown in the trunk of their car. Vesey pursues them and tries to help her escape. In the ensuing shootout, Vesey manages to shoot the thugs, but is mortally wounded. He warns Valerie that the Pirone family will not let her live and she needs to sort things with Rusty directly.

With nowhere else to turn, Valerie decides to use all of the skills she picked up while manipulating the jury and turn the tables on Rusty. She goes to his hideout dressed in a vintage dress and tries to seduce him. Rusty appears to fall for the ruse and starts to kiss Valerie. Suddenly he turns on Valerie and attempts to smother her. Valerie removes an ice pick from her purse and stabs Rusty to death. She then escapes the hideout and returns to her life.

Later, Graham meets Boyle in the aftermath of the shootout. Boyle identifies Vesey's body among those of the thugs, and also tells Graham that Rusty has disappeared. They suspect that the Pirone family had enough of Rusty and may have murdered him. Graham confronts Valerie at her son's football game. He explains that he is not wearing a wire, but he needs to know how a good person like her could help a violent thug like Rusty. Valerie gives an unremarkable answer, but alludes to the fact that she had to protect her son and father.

== Cast ==
- Joanne Whalley-Kilmer as Valerie Alston
- Armand Assante as Rusty Pirone
- Gabriel Byrne as Daniel Graham
- William Hurt as Tommy Vesey
- Kathleen Quinlan as Wanda
- Margaret Whitton as Jane Lyle, Juror
- Ed Lauter as John Boyle
- Mike Starr as Hughie Bonner
- Richard Portnow as Leo Greco
- Lisa Arrindell Anderson as Eleanor Lyons
- Jack Gwaltney as Teddy Parnell
- Graham Jarvis as Mr. Duffy, Foreman
- William R. Moses as Paul Baker, Juror
- Joe Santos as Johnny Verona
- Beau Starr as Phillie
- Bryan Shilowich as Robbie, Valerie's Son
- Stuart Whitman as Emmett, Valerie's Father
- Kevin Ramsey as Edmund
- Fiona Gallagher as Camille, Juror
- Kay Hawtrey as Clara, Juror
- Ardon Bess as Albert, Juror
- Karina Arroyave as Mercedes, Juror
- Andrew Sabiston as Elliot, Juror
- Paul Soles as Mr. Kriegsberg, Juror
- Jovanni Sy as Louis, Juror
- Damon D'Oliveira as Rafael, Juror
- Andrew Miller as Krasny
- Richard Fitzpatrick as Balsam
- Robert Breuler as Judge Feld
- Ron Hale as Bailiff
- Jack Ellerton as Staring Drinker
- Gordon Welke as Hanson the Prisoner

== Production ==
The original script by Jordan Katz was written under the titles of The Hanging Jury and Deadlock. Once Heywood Gould came on board, he rewrote the original screenplay with additional uncredited revisions performed by David J. Burke and Gina Wendkos.

The film was shot in Toronto and features a cameo by Canadian director David Cronenberg as a movie director.

== Reception ==
Trial by Jury received negative reviews from critics, with a rating of 8% on Rotten Tomatoes.

It opened September 9, 1994 on 1,401 screens in the United States and Canada and grossed $2.9 million in its opening weekend, the largest opener that weekend, but only enough for fourth place. It went on to gross $6,971,777 million in the United States and Canada.

== Year-end lists ==
- Worst films (not ranked) – Jeff Simon, The Buffalo News
- 8th worst – Dan Craft, The Pantagraph
- Top 18 worst (alphabetically listed, not ranked) – Michael Mills, The Palm Beach Post

== See also ==
The Juror - a 1996 film also featuring a mother picked for jury duty for a mafia trial and intimidated by mobsters.
