= The Ice Pirates =

1984 film by Stewart Raffill

- Theatrical release poster by Steven Chorney
- Directed by: Stewart Raffill
- Written by: Stewart Raffill; Stanford Sherman
- Produced by: John Foreman
- Starring: Robert Urich; Mary Crosby; Michael D. Roberts
- Cinematography: Matthew F. Leonetti
- Edited by: Tom Walls
- Music by: Bruce Broughton
- Production companies: Metro-Goldwyn-Mayer; JF Productions
- Distributed by: MGM/UA Entertainment Co.
- Release date: March 16, 1984
- Running time: 91 minutes
- Country: United States
- Language: English
- Budget: $9 million
- Box office: $14.3 million

The Ice Pirates is a 1984 American comic space opera film directed by Stewart Raffill, from a screenplay co-written with Stanford Sherman. It stars Robert Urich, Mary Crosby and Michael D. Roberts; and features Anjelica Huston, Ron Perlman, Bruce Vilanch, John Carradine and former football player John Matuszak.

The film was released by MGM/UA on March 16, 1984. It received generally poor reviews on initial release, but was a moderate commercial success and has developed a cult following.

== Plot ==
In a distant galaxy, water is so scarce and rationed that it is considered an immensely valuable substance, both as a commodity and as a currency in ice cubes. The Templars of Mithra control the water and they destroy worlds that have natural water, leaving the galaxy virtually dry. Pirates dedicate their lives to raiding ships and looting the ice from the cargo holds to make a living.

Jason is the leader of a band of pirates that raid a Templar cruiser for its ice, and discover the beautiful princess Karina in a stasis pod. He decides to kidnap her, waking her up, and alarming the Templars. Jason and his pirates flee, but are pursued by Templar ships. Jason lets some of his crew, Maida and Zeno, escape while Roscoe stays to help Jason. Both Jason and Roscoe are captured.

After their capture, they meet Killjoy on their way to become slaves but first they will be 'redesigned': castrated and lobotomized. As Roscoe and Jason are shuffled into the processing facility, Killjoy walks past in a stolen monk's habit as priests are spared "just in case". Our heroes are spared this fate, however, when Princess Karina intervenes and purchases them as her slaves, having them work as servants. That evening, they are reunited with Killjoy (disguised as a robot). Jason, Karina, Roscoe, Killjoy, Karina's servant Nanny and her robot butler Percy manage to leave the planet before the Supreme Commander arrives to arrest her.

Princess Karina hires Jason so she can find her father, who has gone missing while searching for the so-called "Seventh World": a lost, mythic planet rumored to contain vast reserves of water. The existence of such a world would threaten the Templars' water monopoly, and therefore their hold on power. The Supreme Commander of the Templars orders Zorn to pursue Princess Karina in order to locate the Seventh World for the Templars.

At some point, Jason keeps a secret that a nasty creature is hiding in their spaceship. Later, they are about to eat a turkey when the creature bursts out of it and runs away. On their next planet, Jason and Roscoe are reunited with their fellow pirates, Maida and Zeno. They proceed to locate the "lost" planet, which contains massive amounts of water and is protected by a time-distortion field. The planet must be approached on a specific course or the ship will be lost in time forever. As the heroes' ship enters the distortion field, Zorn pursues and attacks them with a host of Templars and robots. This results in a climactic battle as time randomly speeds up and everyone quickly ages into extreme old age.

In the end, the day is saved by the now-adult son of Karina and Jason, the result of a romantic tryst just before entering the time distortion field. As the heroes exit the field, everyone's ages regress to what they originally were, leaving Jason and Karina with the knowledge that they will have a child together. The Templar ship has disappeared as it veered off the designated course during the attack and has now become lost in time for eternity. The crew looks on as they approach the Seventh World, which is revealed to be Earth.

== Cast ==
- Robert Urich as Jason
- Mary Crosby as Princess Karina
- Michael D. Roberts as Roscoe
- Anjelica Huston as Maida
- Ron Perlman as Zeno
- Bruce Vilanch as Wendon
- John Carradine as Supreme Commander
- John Matuszak as "Killjoy"
- Ian Abercrombie as Hymie
- Alan Caillou as Count Paisley
- Natalie Core as Nanny
- Jeremy West as Zorn
- Rockne Tarkington as "Patch"
- Carmen Filpi as Vendor
- Patty Maloney as Waitress
- Ron Taylor as The Pimp Robot (voice)
- Hank Worden as Elderly Jason
- Robert Symonds as Lanky Nibs
- Gary Brockette as Percy
- Marcia Lewis as Frog Lady
- Richard Young as Debs

== Production ==
=== Development and casting ===
The film was based on a script originally called The Water Planet by Stanford Sherman, writer of Krull. The project was set up at MGM, then under studio head David Begelman, with John Foreman attached as producer and a budget of $20 million. However, MGM was in financial difficulty at the time, and its bankers then put a budget limit of $8 million on all films. Begelman and Foreman contacted Stewart Raffill, whose film High Risk (1981) had impressed them, to see if he was able to make a cheaper version of the film. Raffill said he would have to rewrite the script and make it more comic, and they agreed. Rafill and Foreman said the film's main inspiration was pirate movies like The Crimson Pirate and they deliberately did not watch Star Wars.

MGM had a contract with Robert Urich to make a TV series and insisted on him being cast in the lead. John Foreman wanted Anjelica Huston, a personal friend, in the film. John Matuszak was cast because one of the financiers liked him. "It wasn’t my concept," Rafill added. "We just put everything we could in it to make a joke and funny and told the story."

=== Filming ===
Filming started March 1983 at MGM's studios in Culver City. "We got lots of high-tech parts from car engines and gearings and poured molds out of them," said Rafill. "We didn't want to be sleek and spaceship-like, but rather a kind of super-funky, steam engine high-tech, with pistons and gearing—a real hodgepodge. The idea was that these space pirates didn't have good equipment, and had to make do with whatever they could find." Parts of the film were shot at a disused power plant in Playa del Rey and at a Budweiser factory in Van Nuys.

Production was difficult due in part to MGM replacing Begelman with a new studio head, Frank Yablans. Raffill says the film "ended up being a fiasco... MGM went through a transition and they brought in a new guy, who was eventually found out to be stealing money from the company. He was a little problematic sort of a fellow. And he had a bad time with John Foreman so he tried to sabotage the film. Pulled the money out on them, but we did finish it." Raffill says "Turns out the producer was a close friend of Paul Newman's and the studio head had said something derogatory about Paul Newman's wife and so the producer had punched him!"

The film originally had a different, longer ending. Raffill says, "At the end of the film, they were meant to arrive at Earth and they fly over the beaches of Malibu with everyone swimming in the water and the studio head cut that out! He never told me and it was gone. I had to drink vodka to calm myself down."

== Reception ==
The film is somewhat tongue-in-cheek and often compared to Star Wars. On Rotten Tomatoes it has an approval rating of 17% based on reviews from 12 critics. Audiences polled by CinemaScore gave the film an average grade of "C" on an A+ to F scale.

=== Critical response ===
Upon its release, Vincent Canby of The New York Times described it as a "busy, bewildering, exceedingly jokey science-fiction film that looks like a Star Wars spin-off made in an underdeveloped galaxy."

The Morning Call write in its review: "The Ice Pirates, a cross between Raiders of the Lost Ark, Star Wars and Monty Python And The Holy Grail, is amusingly silly through the first box of popcorn. After that, you’re on your own. The movie is more humorous on paper than it is on screen. Jason (Robert Urich) leads a band of spacemen who steal ice from a fleet of interstellar refrigerators. The water in the galaxy is controlled by the evil Templar Empire."

== See also ==
- List of American films of 1984
- List of space pirates

== Sources ==
- Lowry, Brian (May 1984). "The Ice Pirates Defrosted". Starlog. Starlog Group, Inc. (now The Brooklyn Company, Inc.). pp. 44–47. ISSN 0191-4626. OCLC 14796111.
