= The New Swiss Family Robinson =

- Home video cover art
- Genre: Action-adventure
- Based on: The Swiss Family Robinson by Johann David Wyss
- Written by: Stewart Raffill
- Directed by: Stewart Raffill
- Starring: Jane Seymour; David Carradine; James Keach; John Mallory Asher; Blake Bashoff; Jamie Renée Smith; Yumi Iwama
- Music by: John Scott
- Country of origin: United States
- Original language: English

Production
- Producers: Patricia T. Green; Diane Kirman
- Cinematography: Willy Kurant
- Editor: Terry Kelley
- Running time: 90 minutes
- Production companies: Total Film Group; Gross Receipts Inc. Walt Disney Television

Original release
- Network: ABC
- Release: January 10, 1999

The New Swiss Family Robinson is a 1998 American adventure television film written and directed by Stewart Raffill. Based on the 1812 novel The Swiss Family Robinson by Johann David Wyss, the film stars real-life married couple Jane Seymour and James Keach, alongside David Carradine, John Mallory Asher, Blake Bashoff, Jamie Renée Smith, and Yumi Iwama.

== Plot ==
Jack Robinson decides to relocate his family, including his wife Anna, sons Shane and Todd, and daughter Elizabeth, from Hong Kong to Sydney, Australia, aboard a newly purchased sailboat named the Albatross. Before they depart, boat salesman Sheldon Blake hands Jack a handgun under the pretense of self-defense. As they set sail across the Pacific, Elizabeth records their daily experiences in a ship's journal while Anna struggles with seasickness.

On their fifth night at sea, an unidentified vessel pursues the Albatross. Sheldon contacts the family over the radio and demands the yacht back, revealing that he used the ship to smuggle a hidden cache of stolen treasure without Jack's knowledge. Refusing to hand over the boat, Jack uses the motor to navigate through the dark and evade the attackers. In the chaos, the Albatross strikes a reef and breaks apart.

The family escapes to a nearby deserted island using an inflatable dinghy. They build a temporary shelter and salvage supplies from the reef, where Shane and Todd locate the sunken forward locker containing Sheldon's smuggled chest of gold, watches, and jewels. While exploring the jungle, Shane is captured by Francoise, a feral red-headed French girl who survived a 1996 plane crash that killed her family. After Jack helps bury the remains of her family, Francoise integrates with the Robinsons alongside her companion, an orangutan named Big Red. As Francoise adapts to living with the family, she and Shane fall in love. When Shane announces his intention to marry her, Jack and Anna advise them to wait because of their young age, creating tension within the family.

Sheldon and his pirate crew track the Robinsons to the island and abduct Todd, holding him at their encampment on a neighboring island. Jack and Shane launch a rescue mission, locate Todd, and hold Sheldon at gunpoint before escaping on one of the pirates' motorized boats. Sheldon's crew pursues them back to the main island for a final showdown. Using improvised bamboo traps, nettle spray, and physical combat with assistance from Francoise and Big Red, the Robinsons overpower the pirates and capture their vessel. After 182 days marooned on the island, the family sets sail for Sydney alongside Francoise and the orangutans.

== Cast ==
- Jane Seymour as Anna Robinson
- James Keach as Jack Robinson
- David Carradine as Sheldon Blake
- John Mallory Asher as Shane Robinson
- Blake Bashoff as Todd Robinson
- Jamie Renée Smith as Elizabeth Robinson
- Yumi Iwama as Francoise
- Simone Griffeth as Cynthia
- Billy Bates as Halo Pirate
- Rick Kahana as Ninja Pirate
- Joe Isaac as Drunken Pirate
- John Harnagel as Bartender Pirate
- Jaime Irizarry as Nettle Spray Pirate
- John Edmondson as Wheelhouse Pirate
- Diane Kirman as Girlfriend Pirate

== Production ==
The film was written and directed by Stewart Raffill, who specialized in family wilderness and animal adventure films. Lead actors Jane Seymour and James Keach were married in real life during the production.

Principal photography took place on location in Puerto Rico in 1997. Production was temporarily delayed in August 1997 after Seymour contracted dengue fever from a mosquito bite on set, requiring urgent medical care before filming resumed.

== Release and reception ==
As a made-for-television movie, the film did not receive a theatrical box office release. It made its American television debut on the ABC network as part of The Wonderful World of Disney on January 10, 1999. It was later released on home video and DVD by Walt Disney Home Video on August 15, 2000.

Retrospective media studies note the film's modernization of Johann David Wyss's 1812 story, replacing traditional 19th-century survival tropes with contemporary elements like automatic firearms, jet boats, airplane crash survivors, and international smuggling plots.
