= John Campbell (musical composer) =

American musical composer

- Occupation: Musical composer

John Campbell is an American musical composer. He wrote the music for most of the Adventures in Odyssey radio drama series, as well as Lamplighter Theatre, Paws & Tales, Down Gilead Lane, The Chronicles of Narnia, The Extraordinary Adventures of G.A. Henty, the Father Gilbert Mysteries, and the Ark Encounter. He also has written for many television shows, and composed themes for many broadcasting series, including Focus on the Family, Insight for Living, The Coral Ridge Hour, Promise Keepers, among others.
