= A Month of Sundays (2001 film) =

2001 film by Stewart Raffill

- Directed by: Stewart Raffill
- Written by: Keith Murphy
- Produced by: Suzanne DiLaurentiis
- Starring: Rod Steiger; Sally Kirkland; Michael Paré; Sally Struthers; Jamie Farr; Al Sapienza; Dee Wallace Stone; Corina Marie; Jeffrey Tott
- Cinematography: Jacques Haitkin
- Edited by: Terry Kelley
- Music by: John Campbell
- Production company: Suzanne DiLaurentiis Productions
- Distributed by: PorchLight Entertainment
- Release date: September 17, 2001
- Running time: 92 minutes
- Country: United States
- Language: English

A Month of Sundays is a 2001 American film directed by Stewart Raffill. It stars Rod Steiger in one of his final film roles and Sally Kirkland.

== Cast ==
- Rod Steiger as Charles McCabe
- Sally Kirkland as Katherine St. Croix
- Michael Paré as Tomas McCabe
  - Mark Harari as Young Tomas McCabe
  - Ryan James as Child Tomas McCabe
- Sally Struthers as Onida Roy
- Jamie Farr as Par Sundquist
- Al Sapienza as Stephen McCabe
  - David J. Wright as Young Stephen McCabe
- Dee Wallace Stone as Sarah McCabe
  - Michelle Dunker as Young Sarah McCabe
- Corina Marie as Biddy McCabe
- Jeffrey Tott as Jeffrey McCabe
- T.J. Storm as Taxi Driver

== Production ==
Filming took place in Los Angeles, California and began during April 2001,

== Release ==
A Month of Sundays premiered at the New York International Independent Film and Video Festival on September 17, 2001.

== Reception ==
A reviewer for The Palm Beach Post remarked that the film seemed "better suited for TV". Variety also reviewed the movie, calling it "a low-budget, cliche-ridden film featuring a roster of faded stars topped by Rod Steiger, as a sweet, stubborn but ailing grandfather searching for his long-lost son before he dies".
