= Rio LGBTQIA+ Festival Internacional de Cinema =

LGBTQ film festival in Brazil

Rio LGBTQIA+
- Location: Rio de Janeiro, Brazil
- Founded: 2011
- Language: International
- Website: http://www.riolgbtqia.com.br

Rio LGBTQIA+ Festival Internacional de Cinema is a major annual film festival in Rio de Janeiro in Brazil, dedicated to the screening of a wide range of contemporary LGBTQIA+ films. It was established in 2011, and is screened in July each year.

The Festival states that it is focused on supporting artists and filmmakers, providing a means for creative directors to work together and collectively express themselves.

The 2015 Festival lasted for ten days, and included debates, director presentations, panel discussions, Q and A sessions with production staff and screenings in a variety of locations throughout the city. It featured 124 films, 27 full-length features and 93 short films. The International Panorama section featured 18 new films, whilst the National Panorama section, focussed on Brazil, consisted of 9 new films, which were mostly documentaries. The Director And Curator of the Festival, Alexander Mello, explained that "The prevalence of documentaries has to do with the need to tell the stories of what is happening in Brazil in terms of issues surrounding sexuality... It is cinema used as a tool to combat prejudice, as a way of speaking to influential people in the community".

The award ceremony included ways for the public to participate by voting for their favourite films. The talks featured guests including directors and respected figures in the film industry.

== See also ==
- List of LGBT film festivals
