= Blood Sucking Freaks =

1976 exploitation-splatter film by Joel M. Reed

- 1981 theatrical release poster
- Directed by: Joel M. Reed
- Written by: Joel M. Reed
- Produced by: Alan C. Margolin
- Starring: Seamus O'Brien; Luis De Jesus; Viju Krem; Niles McMaster; Dan Fauci; Alan Dellay; Ernie Pysher
- Cinematography: Ron Dorfman
- Edited by: Joel R. Herson; Victor Kanefsky
- Music by: Michael Sahl
- Production company: Rochelle Films
- Distributed by: American Film Distributing Corporation; Troma Entertainment (1981 re-release)
- Release date: November 1976
- Running time: 91 minutes
- Language: English

Blood Sucking Freaks (originally released as The Incredible Torture Show) is a 1976 American exploitation splatter film directed by Joel M. Reed and starring Seamus O'Brien, Luis De Jesus, Viju Krem, Niles McMaster, Dan Fauci, Alan Dellay, and Ernie Pysher. Set in New York City, the film follows a human trafficking ring masquerading as an experimental theater group, which stages Grand Guignol-style performances for audiences, who are unaware that actual murders and torture are being enacted onstage.

Filmed under the working title Sardu: Master of the Screaming Virgins, it was originally released as The Incredible Torture Show in November 1976. Film distributor Troma Entertainment retitled the film Blood Sucking Freaks (Note: This title is sometimes stylized as Bloodsucking Freaks.) upon their acquisition of it in 1981. Troma initially made cuts in hopes of getting an R-rating from the Motion Picture Association of America, but eventually released the version that had all of the most graphic scenes included and was labeled as an R-rated film despite having no such designation from the MPAA. The ratings group subsequently sued Troma for copyright infringement in applying the R-rating without permission; Troma withdrew the rating label, and to date the MPAA has refused to give Blood Sucking Freaks a review at all.

Blood Sucking Freaks went on to develop a cult following, and has been noted as a dark-comic parody of the New York City theater world. Filmsite.org named it one of the most controversial films of all time.

== Plot ==
In New York City's SoHo district, Master Sardu runs a Grand Guignol-style theater with his assistant, the little person Ralphus. The troupe put on grotesque, sadomasochistic shows featuring human-trafficked women whom Sardu and his performers brutalize onstage to audiences who are unaware that the spectacle they are witnessing is in fact real. Professional ballerina Natasha Di Natalie attends one of the performances with her boyfriend, Tom, during which a woman is tortured with an iron tourniquet that crushes her skull, and another woman is dismembered before Ralphus removes and eats her eyeball. Theater critic Creasy Silo is also in attendance, and has an unfavorable response to the show, which he deems pretentious and exploitative. After the show, Ralphus feeds scraps of human flesh to a group of caged women kept in the theater basement as slaves.

Sardu retaliates against Silo by ordering his disciples to kidnap him. The group chain Silo in the theater basement, and force him to view their methods of mind control via physical torture of their victims, turning the women into submissive sex slaves, while Sardu espouses his philosophy behind his shows. The troupe kidnap Natasha next, hoping to utilize her to lend artistic legitimacy to their shows and catapult them to Broadway and eventually Hollywood. Tom discovers that Natasha is missing, and teams with corrupt police officer John Tucci to find her.

Meanwhile, the troupe force Natasha to spectate an array of torturous acts against their slaves, including tooth removals, lobotomies, and dismemberment, rendering Natasha into a fearful psychological state of submission. Tucci and Tom infiltrate the theater and attend one of Sardu's performances, where Natasha is set to perform. Natasha performs an elegant ballet routine for the audience that devolves into a striptease, culminating in her torturing and killing of Silo onstage.

Tucci reveals to Tom that he has uncovered a trove of valuable silver and precious metals in the theater basement, and intends to steal them. After the show ends and the crowd disperses, Tucci and Tom witness a woman crawling from behind the stage with her legs dismembered. Tucci arrests Sardu's female assistant while Tom attempts to free Natasha. Tucci finds Sardu erotically kissing Silo's corpse in the basement, and holds him at gunpoint before tying him to a post and pistol-whipping him. Sardu responds by asking Tucci to "hit him harder".

In the basement, Tucci frees Sardu's caged women who proceed to cannibalize him. As Tom attempts to flee with Natasha, Sardu relishes the sounds of his slaves killing Tucci. In a tunnel under the theater, Natasha, still brainwashed, bludgeons Tom to death with a sledgehammer before joining the other slaves, who have proceeded to brutally kill and dismember Sardu and Ralphus.

== Cast ==
- Seamus O'Brien as Sardu
- Viju Krem as Natasha Di Natalie
- Niles McMaster as Tom Maverick
- Dan Fauci as Sergeant Tucci
- Alan Dellay as Creasy Silo
- Ernie Pysher as Doctor
- Luis De Jesus as Ralphus
- Helen Thompson as Sardu's Assistant
- Alphonso DeNoble as White Slaver
- Illa Howe as Girl on Guillotine
- Lynette Sheldon as Doctor's Compensation

== Themes ==
Blood Sucking Freaks would go on to achieve minor cult following due to its ability to slip between being a serious horror film with sexual overtones and a campy send-up of gore films. The violent deaths of lead actors Seamus O'Brien (stabbed to death in his apartment by a burglar) and Viju Krem (shot by her husband on a hunting trip) after the film's release also contributed to the film's notoriety. Filmmaker Eli Roth, who was inspired by the film, commented in a 2014 interview that it functions as a dark parody of the New York City theater world.

== Depictions of violence ==
Some of the torture methods depicted fictionally in the film include the use of thumb screws, a skull crushed by a vise, amputation at the wrist by a bone saw, the amputation of fingers by a meat cleaver, electro-shock, suspension, the extraction of teeth, the portrayal of an electric drill through a skull with the brains sucked through a straw, the amputation of feet by a chainsaw, stretching on St. Andrew's Cross, caning and subsequent decapitation by guillotine, as well as brainwashing, whipping, darts, and quartering.

== Release ==
The film premiered under the title The Incredible Torture Show in November 1976, and was later acquired by Troma Entertainment, who re-released it under the title Blood Sucking Freaks in 1981. The film was screened out of competition at the 1981 Cannes Film Festival.

=== Censorship ===
Troma executive Lloyd Kaufman submitted the film to the MPAA for American release in 1981, but the organization refused to grant the film an R-rating in its full-length cut. According to Kaufman, the association approved only 54 minutes of the film. Troma proceeded to release the film in its full cut with the R-rating label, which led the MPAA to sue Troma for copyright infringement on the grounds of utilizing the unapproved ratings label. The suit was ultimately settled after Troma was mandated to issue a public apology which was published by The Hollywood Reporter.

=== Critical response ===
Blood Sucking Freaks received largely negative reviews from critics, and as of 2023, holds a 29% approval rating on the review aggregator Rotten Tomatoes, based on 7 reviews. It is considered to be one of the most controversial films of all time by Filmsite.org.

TV Guide panned the film, awarding it 0/4 stars calling the plot "flimsy" and "[an] exercise in total gross-out". Rob Wrigley from Classic Horror.com stated in his review on the film, "If anything makes it tolerable, it is that it is presented as comedy rather than tragedy. Unfortunately, it falls flat far more than it amuses. One could complain about the misogyny of it all. Or its willingness to offend everyone possible. Or even the vibrant, sardonic performances of the principals. But that is giving the film more credit than it deserves". Wrigley also criticized the film's acting.

Scott Weinberg from eFilmCritic.com panned the film stating in his review, "When people use the term 'bottom of the barrel', they often forget about the UNDERSIDE of the barrel, which is where poorly-made dreck like this belongs. It offers absolutely NOTHING in the way of entertainment, and I think you're a cruel little nutcase if you talk someone else into seeing it," also calling it "The nastiest, filthiest and just about WORST thing you will EVER SEE".

The Encyclopedia of Horror says "the film is deliberately tacky and tongue-in-cheek (but distasteful enough nonetheless), in the spirit of Herschell Gordon Lewis." The book reports the film was the subject of a campaign by Women Against Pornography.

=== Home media ===
Troma Entertainment released the film on DVD in 1998, and in a special edition Blu-ray on August 21, 2014.

== In popular culture ==
In the intro to De La Soul's debut album, 3 Feet High and Rising, Plug One cites Blood Sucking Freaks as his "favorite drama movie". Producer Prince Paul sampled Ralphus's line "open your mouth, I’m going to put something nice into it" for the track Open Your Mouth (Hypothalamus) from his debut album Psychoanalysis: What Is It?.

Professional wrestler Chris Jericho borrowed the assistant's name for his own use, naming his bodyguard Ralphus during his time in World Championship Wrestling (WCW).

== Legacy ==
Joe Bob Briggs opened his second season of The Last Drive-In on Shudder with Chopping Mall and Blood Sucking Freaks.

== Sources ==
- Kaufman, Lloyd (2012). Produce Your Own Damn Movie!. Boca Raton, Florida: CRC Press. ISBN 978-1-136-05942-1.
- Milne, Tom; Willemin, Paul; Hardy, Phil, eds. (1986). Encyclopedia of Horror. London, England: Octopus Books. ISBN 978-0-706-42771-4.
- Stine, Scott Aaron (2015). The Gorehound's Guide to Splatter Films of the 1960s and 1970s. Jefferson, North Carolina: McFarland. ISBN 978-0-786-49140-7.
