= Horrors of War =

Horrors of War may refer to:

- Horrors of War: Historical Reality and Philosophy, a 1989 Croatian book by Franjo Tuđman
- Horrors of War (film), a 2006 Nazi Zombie film
