= Nazi zombie =

Horror stock character

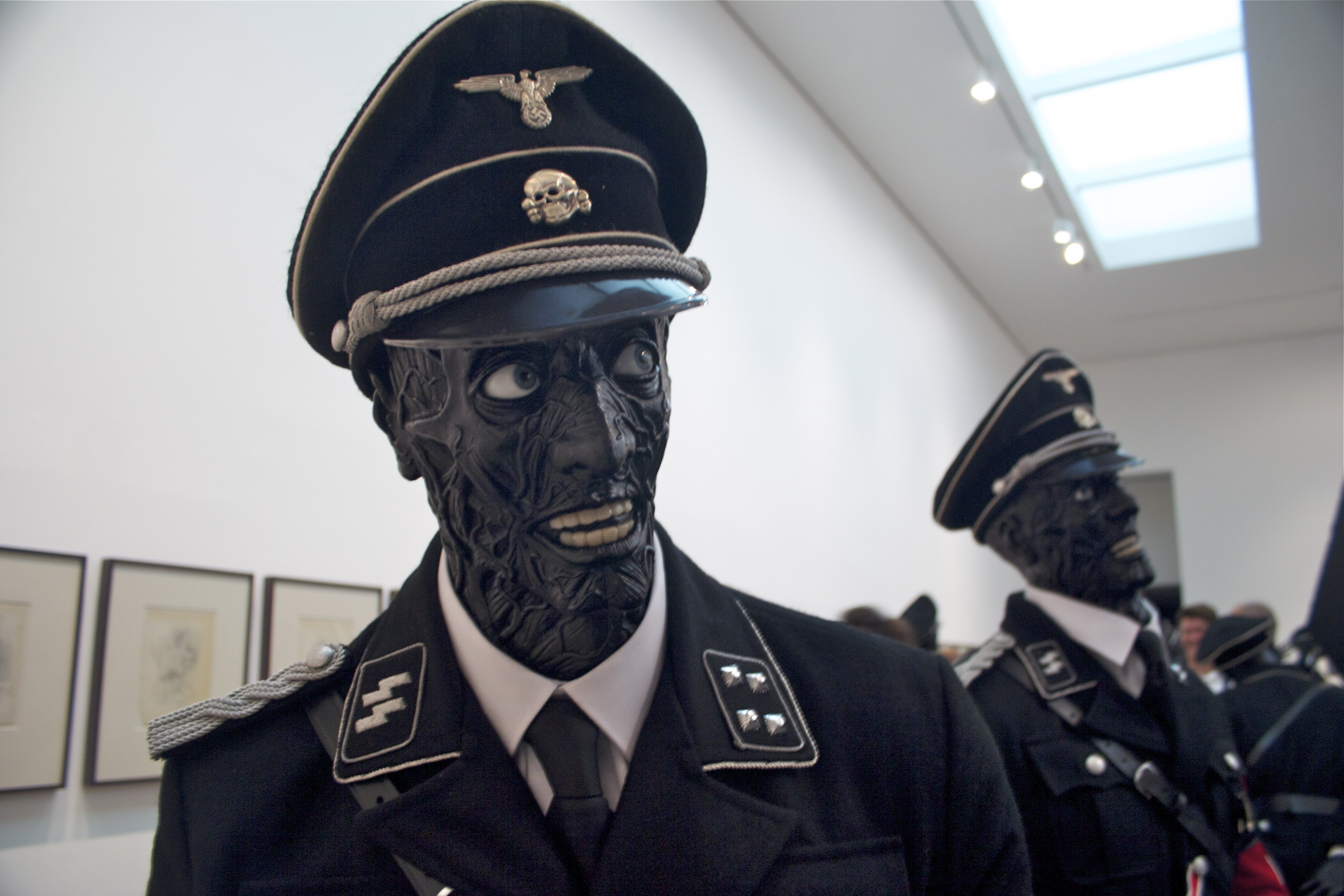
Sculptures of Nazi zombies in an art exhibition by Jake and Dinos Chapman

Nazi zombies are a stock character that depicts zombies who are affiliated with or controlled by Nazis. The earliest Nazi zombie films were King of the Zombies (1941) and Revenge of the Zombies (1943), which depicted Nazi scientists brainwashing and controlling others in the style of voodoo zombies. The time around World War II also saw the publication of several horror comics featuring Nazi zombies. Nazi zombie films in the 1950s and 1960s featured Nazi scientists experimenting to create technological zombies or trying to raise the dead. Shock Waves (1977) was the first film to depict the modern style of shambling undead zombies as Nazis. It was followed by Night of the Zombies (1981), Zombie Lake (1981), and Oasis of the Zombies (1982). Interest in zombie fiction declined until the 2000s. Horrors of War (2006) revived the Nazi zombie genre and was followed by another wave of films. Video games began featuring Nazi zombies at this time, beginning with Wolfenstein 3D (1992) and achieving popularity with Call of Duty: World at War (2008).

Nazi zombie fiction combines the Nazi exploitation genre with the horror genre. Nazis and zombies are both used in fiction to represent evil, and their combination allows audiences to reflect on lingering fears of Nazism. Depicting Nazis as undead creates a dehumanizing effect and makes it easier to other them or justify violence against them. While typical zombie fiction symbolizes the loss of individualism, this is treated more ambiguously with Nazi zombies because they still retain their Nazi identity.

== History ==
=== Early examples ===
The earliest zombie films featured masters who created and controlled the zombies, either through science or magic. Films depicting Nazis as villains were avoided for political reasons until the release of Confessions of a Nazi Spy (1939). The earliest Nazi zombie stories were extensions of the evil scientist trope and its association with Nazism. In the pulp magazine story Z is for Zombie (1937) by Theodore Roscoe, Germans manipulate the people of Haiti by appealing to their religious beliefs about voodoo zombies.

The film King of the Zombies (1941) was created among a popular wave of voodoo zombie films. King of the Zombies depicts an Austrian scientist who uses voodoo magic to create zombies in the Caribbean. The scientist is not explicitly described as a Nazi, but promotional material referred to him as a "secret agent for a European government". The film ends with the American protagonist getting through to his zombified friend by appealing to their friendship, implying that American comradery and independence are more powerful than Nazi totalitarianism. The first true Nazi horror film, Revenge of the Zombies (1943), was a spiritual successor to King of the Zombies, following the same general plot.

American horror comics during World War II occasionally featured Nazi or Imperial Japanese villains who controlled zombies. The Timely Comics story "The Horror of the Haunted Cathedral" in Marvel Mystery Comics #28 (1942) depicted a Nazi raising corpses in Louisiana, making this one of the first zombie stories to depict zombies as the living dead. Nazi zombie stories persisted into the 1950s, including a 1954 issue of the Dark Mysteries horror comic that featured the six-page story "The Living Dead", about the son of a Nazi creating zombies out of people who had been subject to his father's experiments. Films like Creature with the Atom Brain (1955) and Teenage Zombies (1959) also depicted Nazi scientists as they created and controlled zombies, influenced by science fiction stories about radiation and nuclear technology. The films presented "atom-powered zombies" and experimentation on teenagers, respectively. The films They Saved Hitler's Brain (1963) and The Frozen Dead (1966) were prototypes for the modern Nazi zombie film, exploring themes of Nazism and the use of science for evil, though they did not feature true zombies.

=== Modern zombies ===
George A. Romero invented the modern conception of a zombie as a shambling revived corpse for his Night of the Living Dead films, beginning with Night of the Living Dead (1968). Nazi exploitation films were frequently made in the 1970s and 1980s, and Nazi zombie films were created as part of the trend. Shock Waves (1977) was the first film to portray the Romero-style zombies as Nazis. Instead of being cannibals, these zombies are used to pilot U-boats indefinitely because they are unkillable and do not need to eat or breathe. Shock Waves was followed by the Nazi zombie films Night of the Zombies (1981), Zombie Lake (1981), and Oasis of the Zombies (1982). Night of the Zombies was originally going to be set in Japan and based on director Joel M. Reed's experiences in the Vietnam War, but travel expenses led him to shoot the film in Germany instead. Zombie Lake and Oasis of the Zombies were made as allegories for human nature, unlike previous films about the brutality of war. They presented the zombies as Nazis who were killed in surprise attacks and arose to seek revenge.

World War II media proliferated in the 1990s and 2000s. At the same time, the genre of zombie films was revived by films like 28 Days Later (2002) and Resident Evil (2002). These new zombie films popularized swift-running zombies instead of the standard shambling zombies, which were then carried over to Nazi zombie films. The second wave of Nazi zombie films began with the war movie Horrors of War (2006). This was followed by Nazi zombie films like Outpost (2008), Blood Creek (2009), Dead Snow (2009), War of the Dead (2011), and Frankenstein's Army (2013). Horrors of War director Peter Ross and Dead Snow director Tommy Wirkola both attributed their use of running zombies to a desire for the zombies to be more efficient killers. The films of this period sometimes deviated from the standard zombie formula by allowing them to use weapons or eliminating their cannibalistic tendencies. Outpost, Dead Snow and Frankenstein's Army present zombies reminiscent of revenants, draugr, and cyborgs, respectively. Horrors of War features characteristics of a historical film and a war film. Director Richard Raaphorst attempted to create a zombie film about the Normandy landings, Worst Case Scenario, but production never went beyond the creation of trailers and he instead turned his focus to Frankenstein's Army. Later films such as Overlord (2018) continued the Nazi zombie film genre.

As they returned in cinema, Nazi zombies also developed as a popular trope in video games. The Nazi zombie first appeared as a video game enemy in the Wolfenstein series, beginning with Wolfenstein 3D (1992). The idea was then popularized by the Call of Duty franchise with its Call of Duty Zombies game mode, first appearing in Call of Duty: World at War (2008). They also featured prominently in the video games South Park: The Stick of Truth (2014) and Zombie Army Trilogy (2015).

In comic books, Nazi zombies appeared in the manga series Hellsing, the graphic novel War of the Undead (2007) and the Marvel Comics series Marvel Zombies Destroy! (2012).

== Genre ==
Nazi zombie fiction falls under the Nazi exploitation genre and the Nazi horror genre. Nazis and zombies are both culturally depicted as villains and can be used as a simple representation of evil. While zombies are a fictional creation, historical Nazis have been used as villains in popular culture such that they can be used as a stock character.

Nazi zombie films can function as anti-war films that raise questions about good and evil. Video games featuring Nazi zombies are primarily associated with the horror and action genres. To explain the existence of zombies, stories about Nazi zombies may invoke the history of Nazi human experimentation, use paranormal explanations to create a sense of unnaturalness, or combine the two. Critics of Nazi zombie fiction describe it as mere parody or as a misrepresentation of Nazism as something that can be contained or defeated.

Nazi zombies are comparable to other examples of Nazi exploitation horror like the Nazi werewolves from Iron Wolf (2013) and from the fictional film trailer Werewolf Women of the SS in the film Grindhouse (2007). Horrors of War features both Nazi zombies and Nazi werewolves. Frostbite (2006) features a Nazi vampire. There is also a connection to Nazi cloning stories like The Lucifer Complex (1978), which also depict a scientific explanation for Nazis returning. Nazi zombies produce a thematic contrast when placed in an otherwise realistic environment from World War II, such as the battle-torn ruins and era-accurate weapons in the original Call of Duty Zombies.

== Themes ==
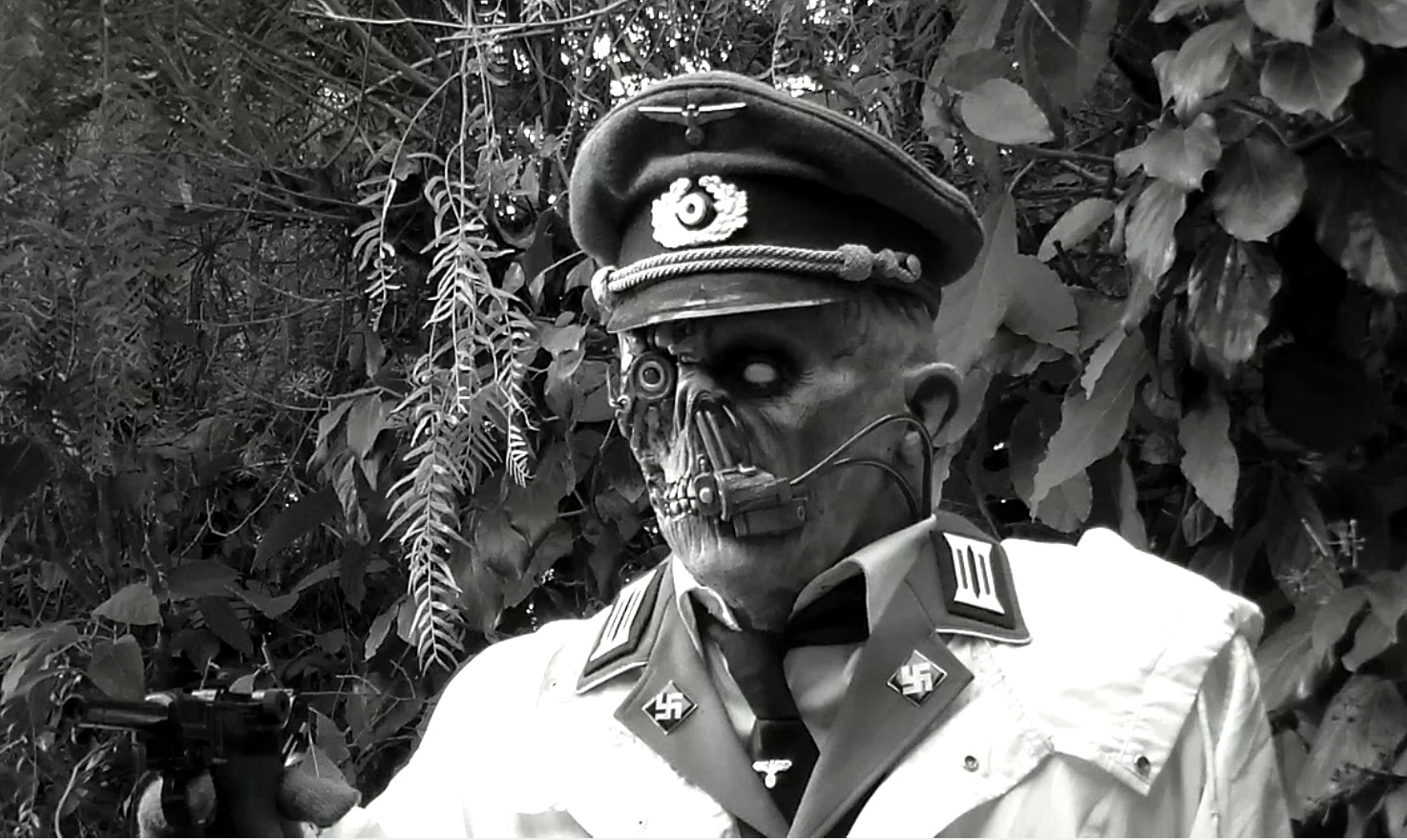
A Nazi zombie costume designed for a horror film

Nazis and zombies in fiction both represent a more dangerous side of humanity, including the potential of the audience to act evilly. Zombies are often used in fiction to express modern societal worries, and in the case of Nazi zombies, this includes lingering anxieties about the dangers of far-right politics. For nations where Nazism is part of their history, stories about Nazi zombies can be used as a form of self-reflection or a means to address historical trauma. Making them into zombies can present Nazism as something that "literally refuses to die".

Using Nazi zombies as villains allows for the depoliticization of a conflict while still having an ideological enemy. They are unthinking, but they are not separated from their living identities and still retain their Nazi affiliation. Turning Nazis into zombies means their role as villains can be further simplified by dehumanizing and othering them. Placing Nazi iconography alongside the undead strips the Nazi ideology of its self-perceived superiority. Othering the perpetrators of the Holocaust in this way can comfort the audience by implying regular humans are not capable of such acts and such a thing cannot happen again. Nazi zombie films can also address the harms caused by Nazism and the Holocaust using dark humor. Media about Nazi zombies rarely mentions the Holocaust directly, as the presence of zombies provides an alternate justification for the audience to oppose the Nazis.

Unlike traditional zombie stories where humanity is turned on itself and may even be responsible for its own downfall, Nazis are depicted as an external threat separate from the rest of humanity. Sometimes this is a threat that brings other countries together to fight a common enemy, which is represented in films like Outpost and War of the Dead. When in conflict with Nazi zombies, the Allies of World War II are presented as inherently on the side of good and fighting on behalf of humanity instead of solely for their own nations or ideologies.

Traditional zombie fiction derives horror from the lack of identity or free will possessed by the zombies. They mindlessly seek to kill, contrasting with the individualist philosophy that is common in the Western world. Early stories about Nazis creating and controlling zombies reflected fears of Nazi subjugation. When the Nazis themselves are zombies, it subverts the common trope of zombies symbolizing the oppressed. The genre may still consider themes of the individual having their individuality robbed from them, which reflects the Nazi characteristic of individuals giving up their individuality for the Volksgemeinschaft, or the collective benefit of the nation. In many cases, Nazi zombies will be organized and militaristic instead of entirely mindless. Nazi zombie fiction leaves open the question of whether all people who give in to a totalitarian government, regardless of their reasons or circumstances, are culpable and warrant a violent response.

Video games involving violent gameplay will often seek ways to allow for moral disengagement on behalf of players to prevent them from feeling uncomfortable about violence they carry out as the player character. Nazis and zombies both assist in this process by presenting targets that players can justify fighting; violence against zombies has no moral considerations because they are soulless and aggressive, while Nazis are identified as inherently evil. German and Japanese characters are sometimes playable in Nazi zombie video games, such as in Zombie Army Trilogy and Call of Duty Zombies, respectively. This creates sympathy for non-ideological members of their nations while further othering Nazis, though zombie fiction related to World War II may sometimes also include zombification of the Imperial Japanese Army, which can risk the creation of Orientalist caricatures and stereotyping. Nazi zombie video games follow the tradition of an individual zombie being easy to defeat and the danger instead coming from a large number of zombies at once. This can be compared to the mob mentality that occurs when larger numbers of people adhere to ideologies like Nazism.

== Works cited ==
- Bishop, Kyle William (2014). "Nazi Zombies". In Fonseca, Anthony J.; Pulliam, June Michele (eds.). Encyclopedia of the Zombie: The Walking Dead in Popular Culture and Myth. Santa Barbara: Greenwood. pp. 180–183. ISBN 978-1-4408-0388-8.
- Chapman, Adam (2019). "The Undead Past in the Present—Historical Anxiety and the Nazi Zombie". In Webley, Stephen J.; Zackariasson, Peter (eds.). The Playful Undead and Video Games: Critical Analyses of Zombies and Gameplay. Routledge. pp. 44–56. ISBN 978-1-138-89546-1.
- Faragher, Megan (2021). "Nazi Zombies! The Undead in Wartime and the Iconography of Mass Persuasion". Revenant: Critical and Creative Studies of the Supernatural. 1 (7): 69–92.
- Höglund, John (2016). "Virtual War and the Nazi zombie Gothic in Call of Duty". In Monnet, Agnieszka Soltysik; Hantke, Steffen (eds.). War Gothic in Literature and Culture. Routledge. pp. 176–191. ISBN 978-1-138-93821-2.
- Kee, Chera (2024). Corpse Crusaders: The Zombie in American Comics. University of Michigan Press. ISBN 9780472904501.
- Luckhurst, Roger (2015). Zombies: A Cultural History. Reaktion Books. ISBN 978-1-78023-564-6.
- Magilow, Daniel H.; Bridges, Elizabeth; Vander Lugt, Kristin T., eds. (2012). Nazisploitation! The Nazi Image in Low-Brow Cinema and Culture. Continuum. ISBN 978-1-4411-8359-0.
  - Bridges, Elizabeth. "Reproducing the Fourth Reich: Cloning, Nazisploitation and Revival of the Repressed". In Magilow, Bridges & Vander Lugt (2012), pp. 72–91.
  - Jüngerkes, Sven; Wienand, Christiane. "A Past that Refuses to Die: Nazi Zombie Film and the Legacy of Occupation". In Magilow, Bridges & Vander Lugt (2012), pp. 238–257.
  - Ward, James J. "Utterly without Redeeming Social Value? 'Nazi Science' Beyond Exploitation Cinema". In Magilow, Bridges & Vander Lugt (2012), pp. 92–113.
- Miller, Cynthia J. (2011). "The Rise and Fall – and Rise – of the Nazi Zombie in Film". In Moreman, Christopher M.; Rushton, Cory (eds.). Race, Oppression and the Zombie: Essays on Cross-Cultural Appropriations of the Caribbean Tradition. McFarland & Company. pp. 139–148. ISBN 978-0-7864-5911-7.
- Miller, Cynthia J.; Van Riper, Anthony Bowdoin, eds. (2015). Horrors of War: The Undead on the Battlefield. Rowman & Littlefield. ISBN 978-1-4422-5111-3.
  - Ward, James J. "Nazis on the Moon! Nazis under the Polar Ice Cap! And Other Recent Episodes in the Strange Cinematic Afterlife of the Third Reich". In Miller & Van Riper (2015), pp. 53–71.
  - Webley, Steve. "The Supernatural, Nazi Zombies, and the Play Instinct: The Gamification of War and the Reality of the Military Industrial Complex". In Miller & Van Riper (2015), pp. 201–217.
- Ordoña, Michael (November 8, 2018). "'Overlord' promises Nazis and zombies but delivers disappointment". San Francisco Chronicle.
- Walker, John (2014-03-04). "Wot I Think - South Park: The Stick Of Truth". Rock, Paper, Shotgun.
- Whittall, Abigail (2020). "Nazi Horror, Reanimated: Rethinking Subgenres and Cycles". In Falvey, Eddie; Wroot, Jonathan; Hickinbottom, Joe (eds.). New Blood: Critical Approaches to Contemporary Horror. University of Wales Press. pp. 167–182. ISBN 978-1-78683-634-2.
