= Angelique Pettyjohn =

American actress and burlesque queen (1943–1992)

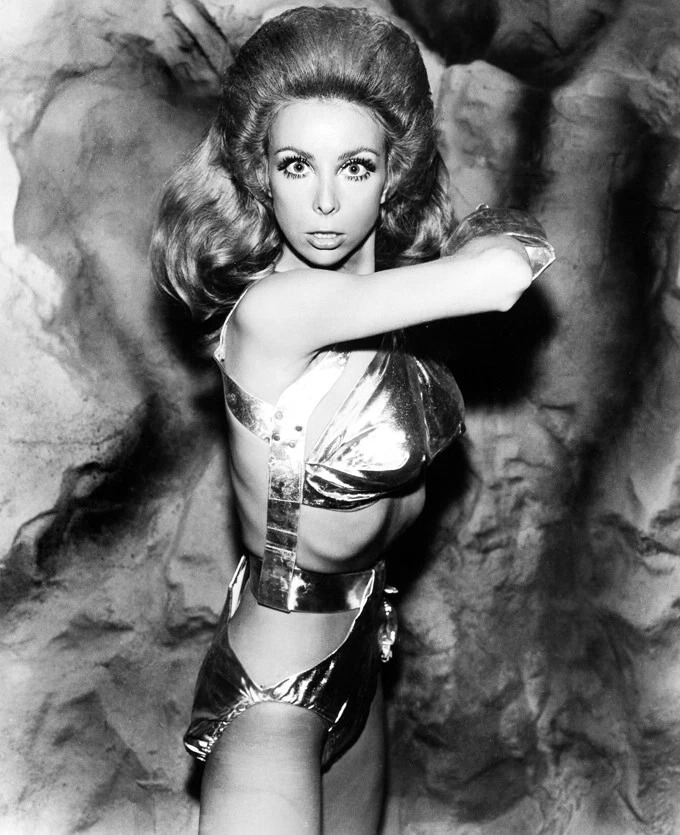
- Pettyjohn in Star Trek: The Original Series, 1968
- Born: Dorothy Lee Perrins; March 11, 1943; Los Angeles, California, U.S.
- Died: February 14, 1992 (aged 48); Las Vegas, Nevada, U.S.
- Other names: Angelique, Heaven St. John, Angel St. John
- Occupations: Actress, model, adult entertainer
- Years active: 1967–1988

Angelique Pettyjohn (born Dorothy Lee Perrins; March 11, 1943 – February 14, 1992) was an American actress and burlesque queen. She appeared as the drill thrall Shahna in the Star Trek: The Original Series episode "The Gamesters of Triskelion".

== Acting career ==
Pettyjohn was born in Los Angeles, California, and raised in Salt Lake City, Utah. Her first credited film appearances were in 1967 under the name Angelique. They include The Touch of Her Flesh and The Love Rebellion. Her big break came that same year in the Elvis Presley film Clambake.

Pettyjohn was one of the go-go dancers in the opening scene of the comedy film The Odd Couple (1968), starring Jack Lemmon and Walter Matthau, and she also tested for the role of Nova in Planet of the Apes the same year (Linda Harrison accepted the role).

In 1968, Pettyjohn appeared in the Star Trek season two episode "The Gamesters of Triskelion" as Shahna, the thrall trainer of Captain James T. Kirk (William Shatner). She also appeared on other 1960s television series such as Mister Terrific, The Green Hornet, Batman, Love, American Style and The Girl from U.N.C.L.E., as well as male CONTROL agent Charlie Watkins (a "master of disguise" who is able to appear convincingly female) in two episodes of Get Smart: "Smart Fit the Battle of Jericho" and "Pussycats Galore" (1967).

In 1969, Pettyjohn starred in the horror film The Mad Doctor of Blood Island, appeared as Cherry in the biker film Hell's Belles, played saloon girl Emily in the Glenn Ford western Heaven with a Gun and starred in Childish Things, co-directed by John Derek.

Pettyjohn's 1970s films included Tell Me That You Love Me, Junie Moon (1970) starring Liza Minnelli, the sci-fi exploitation film The Curious Female (1970) and the low-budget crime drama The G.I. Executioner (1971) where she played topless dancer Bonnie. She played a stripping nun in the comedy film Good-bye, Cruel World (1983), and appeared in such cult classic features as The Lost Empire (1984), Repo Man (1984), Biohazard (1985) and Mike Jittlov's film The Wizard of Speed and Time (1989), where she played Dora Belair, an assistant to movie executive Harvey Brockman (Richard Kaye), and designed her own costumes.

During the early 1980s, Pettyjohn made use of her buxom figure in such hardcore adult films as Titillation, Stalag 69, and Body Talk (all 1982) under the pseudonyms Angelique, Heaven St. John, and Angel St. John.

== Burlesque ==
During the 1970s, Pettyjohn worked as a burlesque star in Las Vegas. In 1970, she appeared in Barry Ashton's burlesque show at the Silver Slipper Gambling Hall and Saloon. She later was a featured showgirl in the Vive Paris Vive show at the Aladdin Hotel. She also was featured in the Maxim Hotel and Casino burlesque show and in 1978, teamed with Bob Mitchell and Miss Nude Universe in True Olde Tyme Burlesque at the Joker Club. She was photographed by Robert Scott Hooper for the February 1979 Playboy pictorial "The Girls of Las Vegas". Pettyjohn became quite popular at Star Trek conventions and in 1979, Hooper photographed her in her costume from the episode "The Gamesters of Triskelion". They produced two posters that she sold at the conventions, one in her complete costume and one partially nude with the costume.

== Death ==
On February 14, 1992, Pettyjohn died in Las Vegas from cervical cancer at age 48.

== Filmography ==
Film
Year	Title	Role	Notes
1967	Hotel	1st Stripper	Uncredited
1967	The Cool Ones	Girl on Tony's Staff	Uncredited
1967	The Touch of Her Flesh	Claudia Jennings	
1967	A Guide for the Married Man	Girl on Wilshire Blvd.	Uncredited
1967	Rough Night in Jericho	Lady of the Evening	Uncredited
1967	Clambake	Gloria	
1967	The Love Rebellion	Pam Carpenter	
1967	Professor Lust		
1968	The Odd Couple	Go-Go Dancer	Uncredited
1968	For Singles Only	Apartment Hunter	Uncredited
1968	Where Were You When the Lights Went Out?	Girl	Uncredited
1968	The Curse of Her Flesh	Claudia Jennings	Uncredited
1968	The Mad Doctor of Blood Island	Sheila Willard	
1968	Cargo of Love	Prostitute	Uncredited
1969	Hell's Belles	Cherry	
1969	Heaven with a Gun	Emily	
1969	Childish Things	Angelique	
1969	The Love God?	Model	Uncredited
1970	Tell Me That You Love Me, Junie Moon	Melissa	
1970	The Curious Female	Susan Rome	
1970	Up Your Teddy Bear	Miss Honeysuckle	
1971	The G.I. Executioner	Bonnie	
1979	Going in Style	Woman at Craps Table	Uncredited
1982	Titillation	Brenda Weeks	
1982	Stalag 69	Nazi Interrogator	
1983	Good-bye, Cruel World	Dancing Nun	
1984	Repo Man	Repo Wife #2	
1984	The Lost Empire	Whiplash	
1984	Body Talk	Cassie	
1985	Takin' It Off	Anita Little	
1985	Biohazard	Lisa Martyn	
1988	The Wizard of Speed and Time	Dora Belair	
Television
Year	Title	Role	Notes
1967	Batman	1st Model	Episode: "A Piece of the Action"
1967	Get Smart	Charlie Watkins	2 episodes
1968	Star Trek: The Original Series	Shahna	Episode: "The Gamesters of Triskelion"
