= Axe Giant: The Wrath of Paul Bunyan (soundtrack) =

Axe Giant: The Wrath of Paul Bunyan (Original Motion Picture Soundtrack)

Soundtrack album by Midnight Syndicate
- Released: August 16, 2013
- Genre: Soundtrack, dark ambient
- Length: 46:36
- Label: Entity Productions
- Producer: Edward Douglas

Midnight Syndicate chronology
Monsters of Legend (2013)	Axe Giant: The Wrath of Paul Bunyan (Original Motion Picture Soundtrack) (2013)	Christmas: A Ghostly Gathering (2015)

Axe Giant: The Wrath of Paul Bunyan (Original Motion Picture Soundtrack) is both the seventeenth album and third movie soundtrack by Midnight Syndicate. The album features Edward Douglas' score to the 2013 horror film Axe Giant: The Wrath of Paul Bunyan and the song The Ballad of Paul Bunyan, performed by Hick'ry Hawkins.

== Background and album information ==
In a 2013 interview, composer, Edward Douglas described the soundtrack:

(Director) Gary Jones wanted the film to have a feel similar to classic monster movies like King Kong. I found myself trying to channel my inner Max Steiner and Bernard Herrmann, in an effort to achieve that big, dramatic, classical sound. The monster in the film is American folklore legend, Paul Bunyan, so it gave me the opportunity to work with some 19th century American instrumentation as well. I think the result is a soundtrack that will sound both familiar and at times very different from what Midnight Syndicate has done to this point.

Later, Douglas said that the Axe Giant soundtrack represented some of his favorite scoring work to date, adding that it both challenged him and allowed him to spread his wings a composer The soundtrack includes the song, The Ballad of Paul Bunyan, written and performed by country punkabilly artist, Hick'ry Hawkins with lyrics that summarize the film's plot.

== Reception ==
Side-Line Music Magazine praised the soundtrack, citing the tracks, S.T.U.M.P.s Meet Bunyan and Bunyan on the Move as being indicative of the "epic arrangements and horror atmospheres" that make the band special. In their reviews, Tim Gross of Gross Movie Reviews and Michael Allen of 28 Days Later Analysis horror websites both singled out Minnesota 1894 as an example of the score's diversity.

== Track listing ==
All music is composed by Edward Douglas, except where noted.

No.	Title	Artist(s)	Length
1.	"Axe Giant Main Title"		1:49
2.	"Minnesota 1894"		2:18
3.	"Babe's Grave"		1:41
4.	"S.T.U.M.P. Medley: The Adventure Begins / Meeks' Theme / Sgt. Hoke's Theme / March to Destiny"		4:36
5.	"Bunyan at Babe's Grave"		1:56
6.	"S.T.U.M.P.s Meet Bunyan"		4:14
7.	"No Escape"		4:13
8.	"The Legend of Paul Bunyan"		6:53
9.	"Zack's Last Stand"		2:21
10.	"Bunyan's Cave"		2:23
11.	"Bunyan On the Move"		3:57
12.	"Final Showdown"		2:59
13.	"Legend's End"		2:57
14.	"The Ballad of Paul Bunyan"	Hick'ry Hawkins	2:52
15.	"Meeks at the Cabin"		1:27
Total length:			46:36

== Personnel ==
- Edward Douglas – composer

== Production ==
- Producer – Edward Douglas
- Album producers – Midnight Syndicate
- Mastering – Gavin Goszka
- Design – Brainstorm Design Group
- Photography – Kinetic Filmworks
