= The Pink Angels =

Pink Angels
- Directed by: Larry G. Brown
- Written by: Margaret McPherson
- Produced by: Edward Atkinson
- Starring: John Alderman; Tom Basham; Robert Biheller; Bruce Kimball; Henry Olek; Maurice Warfield
- Cinematography: Michael Neyman
- Edited by: Grant Hoag; John Williams
- Music by: Mike Settle
- Production company: Plateau Productions
- Distributed by: Crown International Pictures
- Release date: November 1971
- Running time: 81 minutes
- Country: United States
- Language: English

Pink Angels is a 1971 American outlaw biker comedy film directed by Larry G. Brown, starring John Alderman, Tom Basham, Robert Biheller, Bruce Kimball, Henry Olek and Maurice Warfield.

The film follows a group of non-binary cross-dressing bikers called 'The Pink Angels' who journey along the California Coastline on their way to a 'ladies' Cotillion' (a drag-queen contest) in Los Angeles.

The Angels are antagonised by both a rival biker gang and a military General motivated by his disdain for a changing society.

The film is notable for its brutal ending, an abrupt and violent scene showing the Pink Angels in the aftermath of their own lynching – their punishment for cross-dressing – as 'God Bless America' plays in the background.

== Plot ==
The film follows a group of non-binary cross-dressing bikers called 'The Pink Angels' who journey along the California Coastline on their way to a 'ladies' Cotillion' (a drag-queen contest) in Los Angeles.

The Angels are antagonised by both a rival biker gang and a nameless maniacal military general who obsesses over finding and capturing all 'long-hairs'. 'The General' is motivated by his hatred and resentment of the counter-culture movement, being himself a sort of relic of the past, and especially targets biker gangs in his anger.

In the final scenes, the Pink Angels, fully dressed in drag, encounter a gang whose members don’t realise that the 'girls' are actually their rivals. They take the Angels on the backs of their own bikes and head to a party, but the military is waiting. Everyone gets taken in for questioning, where The General interrogates the Angels (whom he takes to be a group of women), hoping for incriminating information on the rival bikers. The Pink Angels instead refuse to divulge any details of the gang, despite their mutual animosity, and then voluntarily reveal their identities.

The film's conclusion takes the form of a jump-cut to a scene where the Pink Angels are shown hanging from a tree, having been lynched – not for being a biker gang but for cross-dressing. 'God Bless America' plays in the background. (Excessively brutal, violent ends were often typical for LGBTQ+ characters in the decades following the implementation of the Hays Code, both as a way to depict LGBTQ+ lifestyles as 'deviant' and to serve as a 'moral' warning to the public.)

== Cast ==
- John Alderman as Michael
- Tom Basham as David
- Robert Biheller as Henry
- Bruce Kimball as Arnold
- Henry Olek as Eddie
- Maurice Warfield as Ronnie
- G.J. Mitchell as The General
- Michael Pataki as Biker
- Dan Haggerty as Biker
- Jackson Bostwick as Hitchhiker
- Melody Santangello as Hotel waitress

== Reception ==
Kevin Thomas of the Los Angeles Times wrote that while the humour "gets campy", the satire is "quite gentle and goodnatured, so much so that the enlightened tone of their film compensates for any number of technical awkwardnesses, especially in the pacing of various scenes." Thomas also praised the performances, naming Santangello as a standout.

Paul Mavis of DVD Talk wrote that too much of the film "makes absolutely no sense" and criticised the editing.

Rob Beschizza of Boing Boing wrote that the film is "so badly edited it lapses into incoherence".
