= Axe Giant: The Wrath of Paul Bunyan =

American 2013 independent horror film

- Directed by: Gary Jones
- Screenplay by: Jeff Miller; Gary Jones; Jason Ancona
- Story by: Jeff Miller; Gary Jones
- Based on: Paul Bunyan
- Produced by: Jeff Miller; Robert Kurtzman; Philip R. Garrett; Gary Jones; Jason Ancona
- Starring: Amber Connor; Joe Estevez; Tom Downey; Tim Lovelace; Kristina Kopf
- Cinematography: Alex Simon
- Edited by: Christopher Roth
- Music by: Midnight Syndicate; Edward Douglas
- Production companies: Kinetic Filmworks; PI3 Entertainment
- Distributed by: Virgil Films
- Release date: June 18, 2013
- Running time: 90 minutes
- Country: United States
- Language: English
- Box office: $2,498

Axe Giant: The Wrath of Paul Bunyan is a 2013 independent horror film produced, written and directed by Gary Jones. It follows a group of juvenile delinquents who unwittingly disturb the legendary Paul Bunyan while embarking on a rehabilitation excursion in the woods, invoking his deadly wrath.

== Plot ==
In the snowy wilderness, having finished work, a group of loggers prepare a massive roast. A grotesque axe-wielding man emerges from the woods, massacres nearly everyone, then runs the foreman through the circular saw.

Sometime later, a group of five young first-time offenders, Marty, Trish, Zack, Rosa, and CB, are taken into the woods for a week long rehabilitation excursion led by Sergeant A. Hoke and Ms. Sam Kowowzinkowski, a guidance counselor. Upon arrival, Hoke tells the others to sleep in tents while he enjoys the cabin. In the nearby woods, a grizzly bear is stalking a deer when a giant man (Bunyan) emerges from the trees. He effortlessly kills the grizzly, then skins and cleans the carcass.

Back at camp, Ms. K talks with the youths at the campfire. A local hermit, Meeks, shows up uninvited before being driven off by Hoke.

The following morning, Hoke takes the others on a grueling hike. When they stop for lunch, Zack finds the skeleton of a large ox jutting out from the ground, and takes a horn as a souvenir. Later, Bunyan visits the site, which turns out to be the grave of his ox, Babe. Finding the skull missing a horn, he flies into a rage.

As the group takes another break, Martin and Zack toss the horn back and forth. A wind passes through it and emits a sound, alerting Bunyan to their location. The giant approaches an oblivious Trish and brings his axe down, splitting her in half. Bunyan bisects Hoke, but lodges his axe in a tree, which allows the rest to escape back to the cabin. Bunyan pulls their van away, stranding the group, then returns to his cave.

Seeing Meeks, the group lets him in the cabin. Seeing the horn, he points out their grave mistake. Meeks tells them the tall tale of Paul Bunyan is based on an actual person, born with a condition that caused extreme gigantism and tripled his life expectancy. After Bunyan's blue ox, Babe, got wounded and wandered into some loggers’ area, they killed it for the meat. An adolescent Bunyan slaughtered the loggers in retaliation, which caused the nearby townspeople to drive him inside an abandoned mine and sealed it. Bunyan grew to his full height while living in the mountains. Meeks tells them they must return the horn or they will all be killed.

Zack runs out of the cabin with the horn and throws it into the forest. The horn is thrown back out of the trees, impaling Zack. Bunyan emerges, drags Zack's body off and returns to his cave to sharpen his axe. Meanwhile, CB's father (the local sheriff) is called to the area for a bear sighting but finds Hoke's body. Bunyan returns and attacks the cabin, drags Rosa out and throws her against a tree, killing her. As the group leaves the cabin, Bunyan prepares to attack them. The sheriff arrives and shoots him with several tranquilizer darts, incapacitating him. Meeks emerges from the woods and hold them all at gunpoint while defending Bunyan. He shoots Martin dead and prepares to kill the others, but Bunyan regains consciousness and decapitates Meeks.

Bunyan chases Sheriff, CB, and Ms. K to a footbridge over a river where they are trapped until a posse of local hunters arrives. They empty their weapons into the giant, who falls into the river below and sinks. Sheriff, CB, and Ms. K leave with the posse.

== Cast ==
- Amber Connor as CB Tanner
- Tom Downey as Sgt. A. Hoke
- Jesse Kove as Zack
- Kristina Kopf as Sam Kowowzinkowski or "Ms. K"
- Clifton Williams as Marty
- Victoria Ramos as Rosa
- Jill Evyn as Trish
- Tim Lovelace as Sheriff Tanner
- Chris Hahn as Gunnar Wolfgang Bunyan
- Joe Estevez as Meeks
- Donna Williams as Mel
- Bud Moffett as Budd
- Dan Haggerty as Foreman Bill
- Alan Tuskes as Elmer the Cook/Militia
- Daniel Alan Kiely as Greenhorn
- John Schneider as Jeb/Militia
- Tom Luhtala as Logger/Militia
- Jeremy Price as Logger
- Eric Zapata as Logger
- Tony Dotson as Logger
- Rachel Demski as Logging Camp Woman
- Sarah Danko as Logging Camp Woman
- Nicholas Arthur as Militia
- Brian Demski as Militia
- Eric Dzugan as Militia
- David Greathouse as Militia
- Chris Hahn as Militia
- Bryan Jones as Militia
- Leo McNamee III as Militia
- Leeann Pawlikowski as Militia
- Sean Rodgers as Militia
- Laurie Lavine as Female Guard
- Mark Sikes as Burly Guard
- Gary Jones as Guy Dragging Bunyan in Flashbacks
- Robert Kurtzman as Guy Dragging Bunyan in Flashbacks

== Soundtrack ==
American musical group Midnight Syndicate created the official soundtrack for the film.

== Production ==
The film's early working title was simply Bunyan and several promotional images were released in December 2010 on Bloody Disgusting. Initial filming took place in Southern California with subsequent filming occurring in and around Mohican State Park and Crestline, Ohio.

== Release and reception ==
Axe Giant saw a limited theatrical release, screening in two theaters for approximately two weeks and premiered May 31, 2013. The film garnered a domestic box office gross of $2,498. The film was released the following month on DVD on June 18, 2013 by Virgil Films & Entertainment and again in 2017 by Sony Pictures Home Entertainment.

There is currently one critical review on Rotten Tomatoes, originally published on Blu-ray.com that awards the film 6/10 stars. The review praises the creature design of Paul Bunyan, calling it "excellent for a B-movie production". The review argues the film's performances are forgettable, though Downey and Estevez stand out and that "the screenplay is padded with inane banter and extensive introductions, taking 40 minutes of screen time before Bunyan arrives to kill the teens".

Axe Giant was reviewed by HorrorNews.net in 2017, where it was mostly criticized. The review initially cites the characters as being one dimensional and the juvenile delinquents going camping premise as being unoriginal. Stereotypical characters aside, the review notes that “not one of the motley crew of campers is remotely likable or endearing” and that most of the performances are bland. The biggest flaw with the film according to the review, is the overuse of CGI, which weighs the film down with inconsistencies and “lessens the intended impact”. The review concludes by referencing the final showdown in the climax that it argues sends an uncomfortable “’not sure what it is so we best just kill it’ message” and ultimately does not recommend the film.

== See also ==
- Paul Bunyan
- Axe Giant: The Wrath of Paul Bunyan (Original Motion Picture Soundtrack)
