= Biohazard (film) =

1985 film

- Home video cover
- Directed by: Fred Olen Ray
- Written by: Fred Olen Ray
- Produced by: Fred Olen Ray
- Starring: Aldo Ray; Angelique Pettyjohn
- Cinematography: Paul Elliott; John McCoy
- Edited by: Miriam L. Preissel; Jack Tucker
- Music by: Drew Neumann; Eric Rasmussen
- Production company: Viking Films
- Distributed by: 21st Century Film Corporation
- Release date: 1985
- Running time: 84 minutes
- Country: United States
- Language: English
- Budget: $250,000

Biohazard is a 1985 science-fiction horror film directed by Fred Olen Ray and starring Aldo Ray and Angelique Pettyjohn. It is a low-budget horror film that draws inspiration from the successful 1979 film Alien.

== Synopsis ==
The story revolves around scientists conducting experiments on transferring matter from other dimensions in a remote desert research laboratory. However, things go awry when a container holding a creature from another dimension is opened, releasing a series of monsters that start rampaging and killing people.

The protagonist of the film is Mitchell Carter, an army officer tasked with tracking down and dealing with the monsters. He teams up with Lisa Martyn, a psychic who has been involved in the experiments conducted by Dr. Williams. As the story progresses, it is revealed that one of the leading characters is actually one of the monsters, adding a twist to the plot.

The midget alien creature (Christopher Ray, the director's eight-year-old son) is depicted as a black, reptile-like being with large beetle shells attached to it. It goes on a killing spree, even attacking a poster of the iconic character E.T. from the film of the same name. Additionally, a snake-like creature is mentioned that emerges from the container, but is eventually killed by Carter.

== Cast ==
- Aldo Ray as General Randolph
- Angelique Pettyjohn as Lisa Martyn
- William Fair as Mitchell Carter
- David O'Hara as Reiger (credited as David Pearson)
- Frank McDonald as Mike Hodgson
- Art Payton as Dr. Williams (credited as Arthur Payton)
- Charles Roth as Jack Murphy
- Carroll Borland as Rula Murphy
- Richard Hench as Roger
- Loren Crabtree as Jenny
- George Randall as Dumpster Man
- Brad Arrington as Chambers
- Ray Lawrence as Mayfield
- Robert King as Sheriff Miller

== Production ==
The creature was played by director Fred Olen Ray's son Christopher Olen Ray. Ray chose to make the alien smaller, as he wanted to play against audience expectations of a large monster being a threat and instead present something that could more easily hide and pop out of tight spaces.

Initially, financing was provided by Kenneth Hartford's production company Eastern Hemisphere, but part way through production, Eastern Hemisphere collapsed, leaving the crew stranded as financial responsibilities fell to director Ray. Luckily, this happened as the MIFED (Mercato internazionale del film e del documentario) Film Market was starting and Ray took the shot footage to showcase to potential investors. He managed to secure a greater amount of funding than they had previously had from European investors.

The film was shot in the San Fernando Valley, with Ray not enjoying shooting there, as the area was often uncooperative to their shooting schedule and more than once the police tried to shut down production despite them having permits.
