= Americana (1981 film) =

1983 film directed by David Carradine

- Poster
- Directed by: David Carradine
- Written by: Henry Morton Robinson
- Screenplay by: Richard Carr
- Story by: Richard Carr
- Produced by: David Carradine; Skip Sherwood
- Starring: David Carradine; Barbara Hershey; Michael Greene
- Cinematography: Robert E. Collins; R. Michael Stringer
- Edited by: David Carradine; David Kern
- Music by: Craig Huntley
- Distributed by: Crown International Pictures
- Release date: October 21, 1983
- Running time: 91 minutes
- Country: United States
- Language: English

Americana is a 1981 American drama film starring, produced, edited and directed by David Carradine. The screenplay and story, written by Richard Carr, was based on a portion of the 1947 novel, The Perfect Round, by Henry Morton Robinson. The novel's setting was originally post-World War II, but the screenplay involved the post-war experiences of a Vietnam War veteran, obsessed with restoring an abandoned carousel.

In 1981, the film won The People's Choice Award at the Director's Fortnight at the Cannes Film Festival. Financing the film himself, Carradine shot most of the footage for the film, which was co-produced by Skip Sherwood, in 1973 with a band of 26 people, mostly his family and friends, over the course of 18 days. Problems with financing and distribution kept the film from being released until 1983. The film was well received by audiences, but met with primarily negative criticism.

== Plot ==
A down on his luck, former Green Beret captain, freshly discharged from the Vietnam War, drifts into Drury, Kansas. There he finds a derelict merry-go-round that he decides to restore. The people of the town have mixed reactions: some support his efforts while others hinder them. Among his supporters are two local business men: a hardware store owner and Mike, a gas station proprietor. Both men supply employment to the veteran as well as parts and tools for his endeavor.

Another helpful character is a young local girl, who watches the reconstruction efforts from afar, and scampers off when she is seen. The girl provides a tool box and some food. Detractors of the veteran's efforts include a band of local teenagers. The protagonist is also harassed by the town's sheriff.

When the town's ruffians vandalize the half-restored carousel, the soldier redoubles his efforts. By this time he has found, to his displeasure, that Mike's favorite pastime is to officiate the weekly cock fights, and the two have a falling-out. Mike refuses to make good on a promise of a much needed part for the carousel, unless the soldier agrees to fight a dog. The soldier reluctantly agrees to the fight during which he kills the dog. After installing the last piece that completes the carousel's restoration, he lays the dog's body inside it, starts it up and walks away, while the townspeople look on.

== Cast and crew ==
- David Carradine as The American Soldier
- Barbara Hershey as storekeepers Daughter
- Michael Greene as Mike, the gas station owner
- Arnold Herzstein as hardware store owner
- Sandy Ignon as Sandy
- John Blyth Barrymore as John
- Greg Walker as Greg
- Bruce Carradine as the Sheriff

In addition to those previously mentioned, the film also featured Dan Haggerty, who starred in the television series, The Life and Times of Grizzly Adams. He provided the fighting dog, played the role of the dog's trainer and worked on the set design and the actual restoration of the carousel.

Robert Carradine, David Carradine's younger half-brother, assisted with the camera work. Greg Walker, former Kung Fu stunt coordinator, served as stunt coordinator and played one of the town's ruffians. Fran Ryan, whom Carradine met while they both worked on The Long Riders (1980), played a colonel in a scene that was shot several years after the main body of footage. Claire Townsend, a United Artists (UA) executive who had helped finance the film, played a lieutenant. Rick Van Ness, who had scouted the location, had a role as a Grateful Dead fan who gives the hero a ride. He also served as production manager.

Calista Carradine, David's daughter, sang the theme song, "Around", during the opening credits. The haunting tune, which was written by David Carradine, was reprised at the end of the film, with Carradine himself singing. Several members of the Drury, Kansas community appear in the film as themselves. Carradine's own dog, Buffalo, is credited in the film playing a stray dog.

== Inspiration and production ==
In 1969, David Carradine and Barbara Hershey met, and began a romantic relationship, on the set of Heaven with a Gun (1969). The film's writer, Richard Carr, had occasion to tell the couple what he referred to as a "bedtime story". Carradine remembered it as "the merry-go-round" story. A few years later, after Carradine had experienced financial success with Kung Fu, he decided he wanted to make the story into a film. He contacted Carr, who secured the rights to the Henry Morton Robinson novel, and began writing the screenplay. He told Carradine that the book contained a much more complicated story than the one he had told him. Carradine responded, "I want to make the bedtime story."

Carradine formed an acting company that he called "'Kansas Flyer', a metaphor for a check that bounces." He acquired a broken-down carousel in a junk yard in Los Angeles, and some broken horses in Kansas City. He and his entourage then headed for Drury, Kansas. The original working title of the film was Around. While exploring film title designs for the picture, Carradine came across a style called Americana. "I was trying to figure out what it would look like if it said Around. Suddenly, I said to myself, 'Why am I doing this, anyway? It's right here in front of me.' I called up the title designer and told him I was changing the title to Americana."

Carradine provided most of the financing for the project, which cost under 1 million dollars. He stated that the purpose of his other acting jobs was to pay for his independent projects, over which he would have artistic control. Carradine said he even sold his Kung Fu residuals to raise money for his own projects, and consequently gone into debt. He also sought advice from directors he had worked with, including Martin Scorsese and Ingmar Bergman. "'The wonderful thing about working with good directors,' Carradine admitted, 'is it gives me the opportunity to pick their brains for my own films.'" Using his spare time to edit the film, in 1981, Carradine finally had a finished project to take to film festivals.

There were setbacks with distribution, however. United Artists, which had ownership of the film, changed hands and the new owners had no interest in the film. Carradine bought the film back from U.A., and set out to find a distributor. The picture was picked up by Crown International, which specialized in teen exploitation films. Just two weeks before the opening was scheduled, Carradine was still shooting some additional scenes.

Another problem arose when a representative from the Motion Picture Association of America set the pictures rating at "R" (restricted), explaining that the sound of the fighting dog's spine being broken was too loud. Carradine said that he would change it. A few weeks later he submitted it again and received the "PG" (parental guidance suggested) rating he wanted, without having changed a thing.

== Reception and release ==
The Los Angeles Times film critic, Charles Champlin, explained that the Director's Fortnight at the Cannes Film Festival "came into being as one of the consequences of the political turmoil that aborted the festival in 1968. It is designed to make the festival a less than totally establishment affair and it offers Third World, independent and frequently angry films on social themes." He further explained that Carradine's Americana was "an ideal selection for the fortnight." In fact, the film won the People's Choice Award there in 1981. Film columnist Christopher Hicks stated that Americana was also warmly received at the 1981 United States Film and Video Festival in Park City, Utah. This was the third of such events which would later become known as the Sundance Film Festival. Carradine said of the audience's reaction to the film, "Well, they laughed in all the right places, and they applauded at the end, so I guess it went alright." He also said, "Americana swept the festival and I came very close to making a distribution deal with Warner Brothers." However, the Associated Press described Americana's reception in Utah as "quiet".

The moment of truth for the film came when it opened in New York City on October 21, 1983. Carradine had discussed Americana with film critic Kirk Honeycutt. Upon hearing of Carradine's death in 2009, Honeycutt recalled the discussion, remembering that he was "most impressed." He explained, "I got an assignment from The New York Times to do a profile on Carradine the filmmaker". Honeycutt's profile was planned to coincide with the film's opening at the Embassy 72d Street theater and the East Side Cinema, in New York City. Carradine commented that when he arrived at the premiere to promote the film, he noticed that the poster and advertisement that he had made for the occasion had been replaced with "inferior ones". He also said that the film received standing ovations at both venues.

However, negative reviews, like the one from New York Times film critic, Janet Maslin, killed the publication of Honeycutt's piece. Maslin said of the final scene of the film, "Anything this moment reveals about Vietnam and about America, not to mention about dogs and merry-go-rounds, has been said better elsewhere." Critic Richard Freeman found Barbara Hershey's character "moronic", and referred to the film as "twaddle." Freeman said it was "fraught with symbolism. Or maybe it is just fraught". He further said of the film, "Actually, it's about David Carradine, of whom the less said the better". The Kokomo Tribune called the story "pointless". When Carradine read the reviews, he went back to the hotel bathroom and threw up. "'It wasn't just that the critics didn't like the picture; they were angry at me for making it,' Carradine said. 'I'll never figure that out.'"

"The symbolism of a man wanting to build something joyful after being part of the carnage and destruction of war," surmised film critic, Charles Champlin. Americana has been considered as belonging to the vetsploitation subgenre, but in an opposite way to First Blood.
