= The G.I. Executioner =

1971 film by Joel M. Reed

- DVD cover for 'The G.I. Executioner'
- Directed by: Joel M. Reed
- Written by: Keith Lorenz; Joel M. Reed; Ian Ward
- Produced by: S.M. Churn; Marvin Farkas; Walter Hoffman; Michel Renard
- Starring: Tom Keena; Victoria Racimo; Angelique Pettyjohn; Janet Wood
- Cinematography: Marvin Farkas
- Edited by: Victor Kanefsky
- Music by: Elliot Chiprut
- Distributed by: Troma Entertainment
- Release date: 1971
- Running time: 89 minutes
- Language: English

The G.I. Executioner (also known as Wit's End and Dragon Lady) is a 1975 American action film directed by Joel M. Reed and written by Keith Lorenz, Ian Ward, and Reed. Shot in Singapore, production finished in 1971, but the film was not released in theatres until 1975.

== Overview ==
A Vietnam War veteran and millionaire freelance journalist spends his time operating a discotheque in Singapore. When he receives a mysterious offer to investigate a defecting Chinese scientist, he finds himself mixed up with a dastardly Communist agent and his voluptuous stripper mistress.

== Cast ==
- Tom Keena as Dave Dearborn
- Victoria Racimo as Foon Mai Lee
- Angelique Pettyjohn as Bonnie
- Janet Wood as Cynthia Jordan

== Reception ==
Variety wrote: "Nutty foreign intrigue plot (sure enough, the bad guy turns out to be Dearborn's old nemesis from Saigon) is hampered by use of stiff, nonactors in minor roles, but "Executioner" develops a certain charm with its old-fashioned B-film clichés, to which modern ultra-violence and sex have been added. Weird plot turns and melodramatic elements in later reels prove to be entertaining in campy fashion, though dance scenes, hairstyles, etc., have become dated."

== See also ==
- List of American films of 1971
- List of Troma films
