= The Chilling =

- Release poster for The Chilling
- Directed by: Deland Nuse
- Written by: Guy Messenger (uncredited); Jack A. Sunseri
- Starring: Linda Blair; Dan Haggerty; Troy Donahue; Jack De Rieux
- Production companies: Trans Bay Pictures; Overseas Film Group
- Distributed by: Coyote Films
- Release date: March 11, 1992
- Running time: 91 minutes
- Country: United States
- Language: English

The Chilling (also released as Gamma 693) is a 1989 horror film directed by Deland Nuse and starring Linda Blair, Dan Haggerty, Jack De Rieux, and Troy Donahue.

== Premise ==
In a cryogenic laboratory located in Kansas City a number of rich, or, famous personalities have their frozen dead bodies stored in order to await revival in the future.

While the director of the lab is taking advantage of the situation by selling organs taken from the corpses, some of them come back to "life" as zombies.

== Cast ==
- Linda Blair
- Dan Haggerty
- Troy Donahue
- Jack De Rieux

== Production ==
The film was shot from January through February 1989 with a few days worth of reshoots in April of that year in and around the San Francisco Bay Area. The script was ghostwritten by Guy Messenger under Jack A. Sunseri's name.

== Release ==
The film was theatrically released in 1989. The Chilling was re-released direct-to-video on March 11, 1992.

== Reception ==
The film received extremely negative critical response both at the time of its release(s) and retrospectively.

== Confusion ==
The 1979/1981 horror film "Night of the Wehrmacht Zombies/ Night of the Zombies II (...) was released on video in the UK as ''The Chilling'', which meant it was often confused" with this film. What's more, the first film offers the particularity of having two of its alternative titles in common with Nuse's film (namely Gamma 693 and The Chilling, for that matter).
