= Drury, Kansas =

Unincorporated community in Sumner County, Kansas

- Unincorporated community
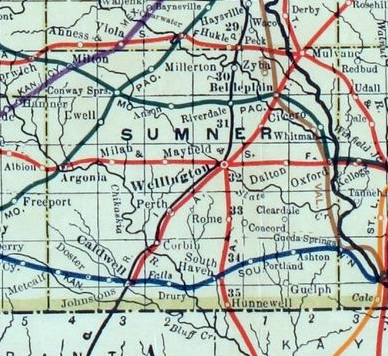
- 1915 railroad map of Sumner County

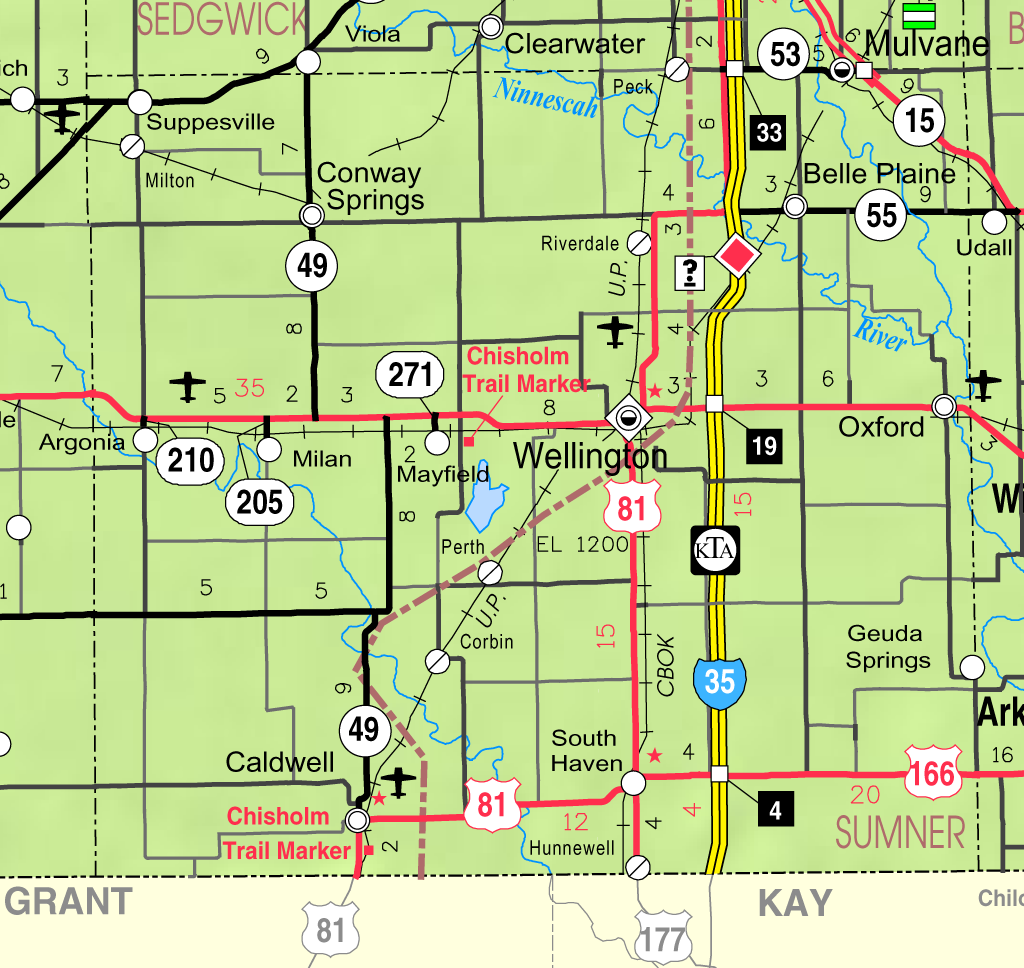
- KDOT map of Sumner County (legend)

- Location within Kansas Location within the United States
- Coordinates: 37°02′08″N 97°28′40″W
- Country: United States
- State: Kansas
- County: Sumner
- Township: Falls
- Elevation: 1,093 ft (333 m)
- Time zone: UTC-6 (CST)
  - Summer (DST): UTC-5 (CDT)
- Area code: 620
- FIPS code: 20-18725
- GNIS ID: 470077

Drury is an unincorporated community in Falls Township, Sumner County, Kansas, United States. It is located between South Haven and Caldwell near the intersection of S Drury Rd and W 175th St S, next to the Chikaskia River and next to an abandoned railroad.

== History ==
Drury was a station and shipping point on the Kansas Southwestern Railway that previously passed through the community, east to west, from South Haven to Caldwell.

Drury had a post office from 1884 until 1921.

The movie Americana was filmed in Drury.

== Education ==
The community is served by Caldwell USD 360 public school district.
