= Born Champion =

- Directed by: Aron Schifman
- Screenplay by: Joe Hart
- Produced by: Anna Malova
- Starring: Josh Aubin; Dan Haggerty; Leslie Ryan; Jenna Fischer; Elyse Rogers
- Cinematography: Michael Goi
- Edited by: Fred Roth
- Production companies: Porchlight Entertainment; American Film Productions, Inc
- Distributed by: Peacock Films; Dantalon Entertainment
- Release date: October 11, 1998
- Running time: 95 minutes
- Country: United States
- Language: English

Born Champion is a 1998 American sports film written by Joe Hart, directed by Aron Schifman and starring Dan Haggerty, Kathleen Gati, Jenna Fischer, Josh Aubin, Leslie Ryan and Elyse Rogers.

The low-budget film is notable for being the feature debut of Fischer.

== Plot ==
With his family experiencing difficulties following his father's motocross-related death, teenager Danny Stewart is forbidden from participating in the sport by his mother. Ignoring his mother's wishes, Danny and a retired motorbike mechanic, Buck, manage to buy a motorbike. They start a training routine to prepare for a significant race.

== Cast ==
- Josh Aubin as Danny Stewart
- Dan Haggerty as Buck McCoy
- Kathleen Gati as Eleaine McCoy
- Leslie Ryan as Kay Stewart
- Jenna Fischer as Wendy Miller
- Elyse Rogers as Carol Stewart

== Production ==
=== Filming ===
In her memoir, The Actor's Life: A Survival Guide, Fischer states she was paid approximately $300 for her role in the film. She said the film was "basically the same plot as The Karate Kid, except instead of karate he did motocross". Fischer had been acting professionally for three years upon the release of Born Champion, and it was her first widely distributed feature film role.
