= Dan Haggerty =

American actor (1942–2016)

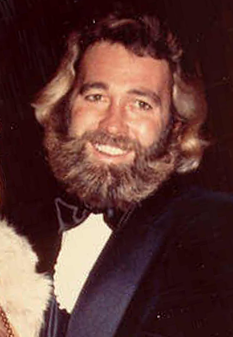
- Haggerty in 1978
- Born: Daniel Francis Haggerty; November 19, 1942; Pound, Wisconsin, U.S.
- Died: January 15, 2016 (aged 73); Burbank, California, U.S.
- Occupation: Actor
- Years active: 1959–2016
- Spouses: Diane Rooker (m. 1959; div. 1984) Samantha Haggerty (m. 1984; died 2008)
- Children: 5

Daniel Francis Haggerty (November 19, 1942 – January 15, 2016) was an American actor who was best known for playing the title role in the film and television series The Life and Times of Grizzly Adams (1974; 1977–1978).

== Early life ==
Daniel Francis Haggerty was born November 19, 1942, in Pound, Wisconsin. His parents separated when he was three, and he lived with his father in Burbank, California. He ran away from military school several times.

== Acting career ==
Haggerty was cast in a small non-speaking role as a bodybuilder in the 1964 film Muscle Beach Party and also as a bodybuilder in the 1965 romantic comedy musical Girl Happy. He also worked as a stuntman on the 1966 television series Tarzan, and as set builder on various other projects. More stunt work followed, as well as supporting roles in numerous low-budget biker and wildlife films of the era, such as Angels Die Hard, The Adventures of Frontier Fremont, and Terror Out of the Sky. In addition to his bit part as a hippie in Easy Rider, he also assisted in building the motorcycles featured in the film.

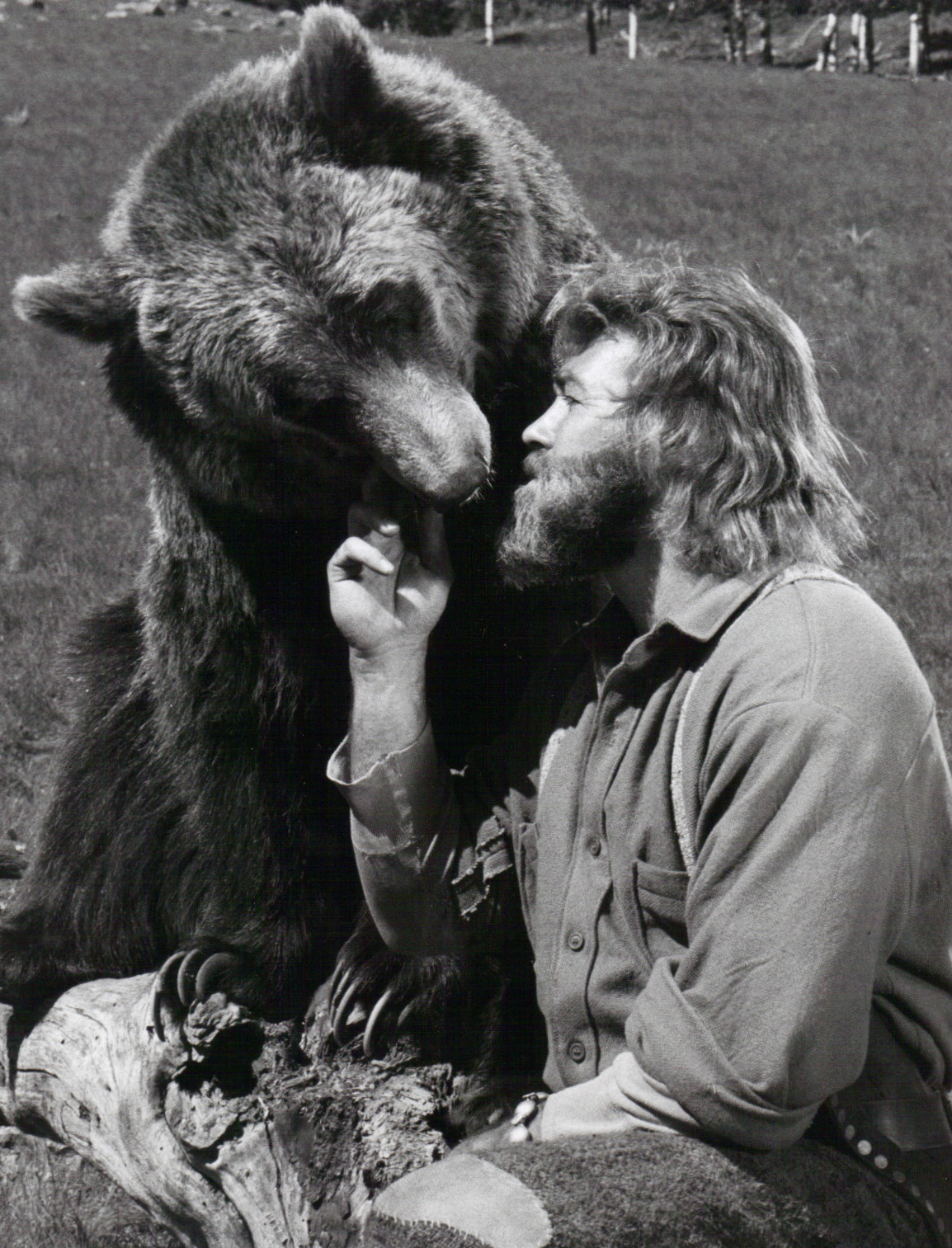
Haggerty in The Life and Times of Grizzly Adams

His experience with animals also brought him work as an animal trainer and handler in films produced by Walt Disney Studios. Haggerty directed white tigers, wolverines, eagles, and wild boar in the 1974 feature film When the North Wind Blows for Sunn Classic Pictures, which also produced The Life and Times of Grizzly Adams, a wildly popular film released the same year, in which he portrayed the title character Grizzly Adams. From the latter film evolved the NBC television series of the same name which ran from 1977 to 1978, and Haggerty became known to movie-goers for his portrayal of nature-loving James Capen "Grizzly" Adams.

Haggerty starred in the television film Condominium (1980), which also starred Barbara Eden, Ralph Bellamy and Stuart Whitman. Haggerty played a hydrology expert trying to warn residents that their Florida condos were about to be demolished in an approaching hurricane. In 1981, he appeared in an episode of Charlie's Angels, called "Waikiki Angels," as Bo Thompson. He guest-starred as Sawdust Radell on The Love Boat in 1983 ("World's Greatest Kisser"). That year, he also appeared briefly in David Carradine's 1983 film Americana and provided a fighting dog for the production. In the film, he not only played the role of the dog's trainer, but also assisted in set design and the restoration of a broken down carousel, which figured prominently in the film.

Haggerty made a cameo appearance as an attorney in Terror Night (1987) with John Ireland and Cameron Mitchell, starred in Night Wars (1988) as a Vietnam veteran who is a psychologist dealing with nightmares of his fellow veterans. He appeared in low budget horror cult classics such as, Elves (1989) and the Linda Blair film The Chilling in 1989. He starred in the 1989 film Spirit of the Eagle. Haggerty played the lead role in the film Repo Jake (1990) and in 1997 played himself in a film titled Motorcycle Cheerleading Mommas. Though not much is known about this film, Motorcycle Cheerleading Mommas was one of the last movies to be ever shot at the historical Iverson Movie Ranch in California.

In 1995's Grizzly Mountain, he starred as a modern-day version of Grizzly Adams and worked with bears, foxes, and hawks in the film. He reprised his role in Escape to Grizzly Mountain (2000). Haggerty was featured as a character in Al Franken's 1999 political satire novel, Why Not Me?.

Haggerty also worked as an infomercial spokesman. One of his endorsements was for the Pap-Ion Magnetic Inductor (PAP-IMI), a device alleged to have health benefits. He had been hired as a spokesperson and was found not to be part of the fraud that later embroiled the manufacturer.

In Big Stan (2007), he played Tubby, and appeared as a lumberjack foreman in Axe Giant: The Wrath of Paul Bunyan (2013). Haggerty also performed several voice-overs and can also be seen in music videos by Hank Williams Jr. and Rogues of the Empire. Haggerty appeared on the U.S. television show American Pickers in its episode "California Kustom", which aired on History on February 25, 2013.

== Personal life ==
Haggerty married Diane Rooker in 1959 at a Las Vegas wedding chapel in the Silver Slipper Hotel when they were 17. The couple had two daughters, Tracey and Tammy. They divorced in 1984, after which Haggerty married Samantha Hilton. Haggerty and Hilton had two sons, Dylan and Cody, and one daughter, Megan. They were married until Hilton's death following a motorcycle accident on August 10, 2008.

Dan also had a son Don in 1963

Haggerty lived on a small ranch in Malibu Canyon with an assortment of wild animals that he had tamed at birth or rescued from injury. At a restaurant in 1977, a patron with a flaming drink set Haggerty's beard on fire. As he attempted to extinguish the flames, Haggerty received third-degree burns on his arms. Production on The Life and Times of Grizzly Adams television series was halted while Haggerty recovered. In 1991, Haggerty was hospitalized after a motorcycle accident left him in a coma.

In 1985, Haggerty received a jail sentence of 90 days and three years' probation after being convicted of selling cocaine to an undercover police officer.

=== Death ===
In August 2015, Haggerty was diagnosed with spinal cancer after a tumor was discovered during back surgery. He died from the cancer on January 15, 2016, in Burbank, California.

== Selected filmography ==
- Muscle Beach Party (1964)
- Girl Happy (1965)
- Easy Rider (1969)
- Angels Die Hard (1970)
- The Tender Warrior (1971)
- Chrome and Hot Leather (1971)
- Bury Me an Angel (1972)
- The Pink Angels (1972)
- Hex (1973)
- Superchick (1973)
- When the North Wind Blows (1974)
- The Life and Times of Grizzly Adams (1974)
- The Adventures of Frontier Fremont (1976)
- Grizzly Adams: Once Upon a Starry Night (1978)
- King of the Mountain (1981)
- The Capture of Grizzly Adams (1982)
- Americana (1983)
- Abducted (1986)
- Terror Night (1987)
- Bloody Movie (1987)
- Nightwars (1988)
- Elves (1989)
- The Chilling (1989)
- Spirit of the Eagle (1989)
- Ice Pawn (1989)
- Mind Trap (1989)
- Repo Jake (1990)
- Chance (1990)
- Inheritor (1990)
- One Man War~ Macon County War (original title) (1990)
- Soldier's Fortune (1992)
- The Magic Voyage (1994)
- Cheyenne Warrior (1994)
- The Christmas Light (1995)
- Sign of the Otter (1995)
- The Little Patriot (1995)
- Abducted 2: The Reunion (1995)
- The Christmas Brigade (1996)
- Grizzly Mountain (1997)
- Born Champion (1998)
- Puss in Boots (1999)
- Escape to Grizzly Mountain (2000)
- An Ordinary Killer (2003)
- Motocross Kids (2004)
- Pocket Angel (2005)
- Big Stan (2007)
- The Book of Ruth: Journey of Faith (2009)
- Casa de mi Padre (2012)
- Axe Giant: The Wrath of Paul Bunyan (2013)
- Dead In 5 Heartbeats (2013)
- 40 Nights (2016)
- The Untold Story (2016) Movie dedicated to his memory.

== Awards ==
- 1980 — Awarded the People's Choice Award for most popular actor.
- 1986 — Awarded the Harley-Davidson "Humanitarian of the Year" Award.
- 1994 — Received a star on the Hollywood Walk of Fame.
- 2009 — Awarded a star in Kanab, Utah "Hollywood of the West."
- Awarded The Dove Foundation's "Diamond Seal of Approval" for more than 1 million family videos sold.
- Awarded the Paul Harris Fellowship from the Rotary Foundation of Rotary International
