= The Adventures of Frontier Fremont =

1976 film

- Directed by: Richard Friedenberg
- Written by: David O'Malley
- Story by: Richard Friedenberg; Charles E. Sellier Jr.
- Produced by: David O'Malley; Charles E. Sellier Jr.
- Starring: Dan Haggerty; Denver Pyle
- Cinematography: George Stapleford
- Edited by: Sharron Miller
- Music by: Bob Summers
- Production company: Sunn Classic Pictures
- Distributed by: Sunn Classic Pictures
- Release date: January 14, 1976
- Running time: 106 minutes
- Country: United States
- Language: English
- Box office: $5.5 million

The Adventures of Frontier Fremont, released in the UK as Spirit of the Wild, is a 1976 American Western adventure film directed by Richard Friedenberg, starring Dan Haggerty and Denver Pyle. The Adventures of Frontier Fremont, a family movie, tells the story of Jacob "Frontier" Fremont. Fremont, originally from St. Louis, gives up his job as a tinsmith in favor of a life as a mountain man. In the mountains he befriends and protects many local animals. Denver Pyle co-stars as "the old mountaineer". Three of the stars, Dan Haggerty, Denver Pyle and Don Shanks, also appeared together in the TV series The Life and Times of Grizzly Adams.

== Cast ==
- Dan Haggerty as Jacob "Frontier" Fremont
- Denver Pyle as Old mountain man
- Tony Mirrati as Kemp
- Norman Goodman as Williams
- Teri Hernandez as Shining Water
- Don Shanks as Indian
- Lee Sollenberger as Man at fort

== Production ==
Parts of the film were shot in Park City, Kamas and Uinta National Forest in Utah.
