= Repo Jake =

- VHS cover
- Directed by: Joseph Merhi
- Written by: Joe Hart
- Starring: Dan Haggerty; Dana Bentley; Steve Hansbourgh; Robert Axelrod; Jim Williams; Stacey Christine; Bonnie Paine; Paul Hayes
- Production company: PM Entertainment
- Release date: 1990
- Running time: 86 minutes
- Country: United States
- Language: English

Repo Jake is a 1990 American action film directed by Joseph Merhi and starring Dan Haggerty, Dana Bentley, Steve Hansbourgh, Paul Hayes, Walter Cox, Steve Wilcox, and Robert Axelrod.

== Plot ==
Jake Baxter, an ex-Marine and a former racer, moves from Minnesota to Los Angeles, California, to earn money as a repo man, hoping to make at least $60,000 in three months in order to pay off his lot that is to be repossessed. He stops a thief from stealing the purse of Jenny, an aspiring actress, and the two have dinner. Working for a repo company managed by a man named Bulldog, Jake meets his co-workers, who include Jam, Lippy, Blondie, Amos, Waldo, and Skidmark. Jake repossesses several cars, and even a helicopter, and watches drag racing live with his co-workers. Also at the drag race is King, a crime lord working for Mr. Kovar, who warns King not to waste his loaned money betting on races.

Blondie develops a car to be used in the drag racing tournaments, and finds that Jake excels at driving it. One night, Blondie attempts to repossess a car owned by King, and King and one of his associates assault him. While on a pornographic film set during a suggestive photo shoot, Jake knocks out King and his partner, takes King's keys, and repossesses his car. Jake has dinner with Jenny, and tells her that he originally quit racing after his wife died from illness while he raced in and won a time trial for the Indianapolis 500. When Jenny leaves to get more beer, Jake finds her standing on a milk crate with a noose around her neck, and King warns him that he and Jenny will face consequences if Jake loses the upcoming drag race. The milk crate is kicked away, and Jake saves Jenny from hanging.

In the racing tournament, Jake purposefully stops the car, losing the race. After Bulldog berates Jake for losing the race, and therefore causing him to lose a bet, King and his associate confront Jake and Jenny with firearms. Jake's co-workers arrive in time to fight King and his partner, followed by the arrival of Mr. Kovar, who has King shot and killed for continuing to bet on races. The co-workers then have a party, and after giving the keys to the race car back to Blondie, Jake leaves with Jenny.

== Cast ==
- Dan Haggerty as Jake Baxter
- Dana Bentley as Jenny
- Steve Hansbourgh as Jam
- Paul Hayes as Bulldog
- Walter Cox as Lippy
- Steve Wilcox as Blondie
- Robert Axelrod as King
- Carmen Filpi as Amos
- Joe Garcia as Skidmark
- James Hurd as Leon
- Leslie Horan as Lea
- Stacey Christine as Lin
- Andrew Reilly as Mr. Kovar
- Delores Nascar as Krott
- Jim Williams as Porn Director
- Bonnie Paine as R.V. Girl

== Home media ==
The film was released on VHS by Anchor Bay Entertainment in January 1995. The film was released on DVD in an 8-film combo pack by Echo Bridge Home Entertainment on March 5, 2013, along with From Dusk till Dawn, Heist, The Big Man: Crossing the Line, Roadracers, Last Man Standing, Men with Guns, and Maximum Force.
