= Pap-Ion Magnetic Inductor =

Pap-Ion Magnetic Inductor (PAP-IMI or Papimi) is an electromagnetic "energy medicine" device manufactured in Athens. It was invented by Panos Pappas, a Greek mathematician. Proponents claim that the pulsed electromagnetic waves or fields generated by the device have pain relieving properties, cure AIDS, cancer and reduce grey hair and wrinkles. It is also purported to have rapid healing effects, and benefit chronic fatigue, allergies, and fractured bones, among other health problems.

It has been described as "potentially dangerous" as it may be used in place of valid medical therapies, and "a major health fraud".

It is illegal for use in the United States due to lack of Food and Drug Administration approval. Health Canada has issued a recommendation for the public to avoid use of these risky, unlicensed devices, and has ordered the Canada Border Services Agency to seize them upon attempted import into the country. Actor Dan Haggerty has appeared in commercial endorsements for the device, although there is no evidence he was aware of the legal and ethical problems associated with it at the time he agreed to endorse it. Although importation of the device to the US is illegal, a number of machines were imported under fraudulent descriptions.

== See also ==
- Pseudoscience
- Quackery
