= Robert Axelrod (actor) =

American actor (1949–2019)

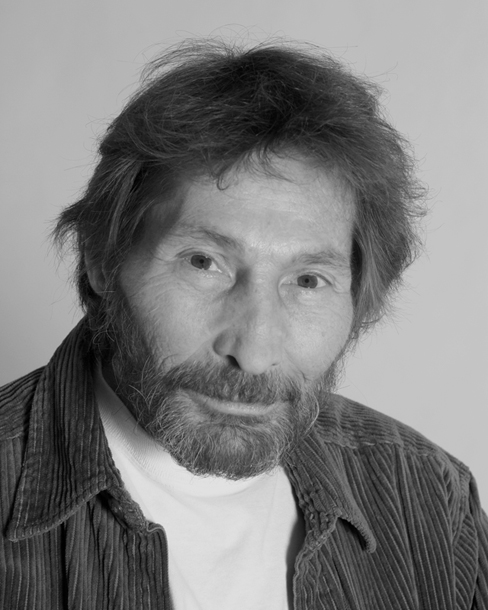
- Axelrod in 2008
- Born: May 29, 1949; New York City, New York, U.S.
- Died: September 7, 2019 (aged 70); Los Angeles, California, U.S.
- Other names: Axel Roberts; Myron Mensah; Terry Bruge-Hiplo
- Occupation: Actor
- Known for: Voice of Lord Zedd

Robert Axelrod (May 29, 1949 – September 7, 2019), also credited as Axel Roberts and Myron Mensah, was an American actor. He was primarily known for his voice work, which included Digimon, having started voice acting for the English-language versions of anime in 1980; providing the voice of Lord Zedd, the main villain of the Mighty Morphin Power Rangers; and Finster, the original Mighty Morphin Power Rangers monster maker. He also portrayed a sympathetic doctor, Jennings, in The Blob. He also portrayed a Paul McCartney look-alike on the popular sitcom Family Matters, and later in his career appeared in several productions by comedy duo Tim & Eric.

== Biography ==
He was born and raised in New York City. He has said that he wanted to be in the entertainment industry starting in kindergarten after first entertaining his classmates. He started acting in commercials and theater as a child. He then worked as a full-time guitarist in the early 1970s. Then in 1980 he got his start in voice over roles with Banner the Squirrel. He continued throughout the years performing on stage and in 1983 starred in the rock play All the Difference. In 1984 he started working for Saban Entertainment doing voice over and writing for programs including Wowser and Hallo Spencer, which he said were "the two finest products we produced." His agency, Mobile Monicker Productions, noted that he voiced over 150 characters in his career.

=== Death ===
Axelrod died at the age of 70 on September 7, 2019, due to complications from spinal surgery he had undergone in 2018. He was survived by his sister.

== Filmography ==
=== Anime ===
- Aesop's Fables - Hare
- Around the World with Willy Fog - Additional Voices
- The Big O - Colonel Anthony Gauss - As Axel Roberts
- Carried by the Wind: Tsukikage Ran - Genma Otagaki
- Codename: Robotech - Rico
- Cowboy Bebop - Doctor Londes - As Axel Roberts
- Digimon Adventure - Wizardmon, Vademon
- Digimon Adventure 02 - Armadillomon, Ankylomon, Wizardmon, Shakkoumon (Shared with Dave Mallow)
- Dogtanian and the Three Muskehounds - Blue Falcon, Additional Voices
- Dragon Ball - Master Shen
- Gaiking - Prince Darius, Additional voices
- Ghost in the Shell: Stand Alone Complex - Katakura
- Grimm's Fairy Tale Classics - Hare
- Hajime no ippo - Hachinohe
- Honeybee Hutch - Additional Voices
- Little Women - Father
- Lensman - Sol
- Maple Town - Additional Voices
- Neo-Tokyo - Tsutomu Sugioka
- The Noozles - Additional Voices
- Robotech - Rico (as Axel Roberts)
- Rurouni Kenshin - Sakata, Additional Voices
- Samurai Champloo - Roukishi
- Space Pirate Captain Harlock - Dr. Zero
- Transformers: Robots in Disguise - Movor
- Wowser - Ratso Catso
- Ys - Jenokris

=== Animation ===
- Animated Stories from the New Testament - Bartholomew
- Chucklewood Critters - George, Easter Bunny
- Creepy Crawlers - Additional Voices
- Iznogoud - Additional Voices
- Jin Jin and the Panda Patrol - Professor Know-A-Lot, Additional Voices
- Journey to the Heart of the World - Scarface
- Mickey Mouse Works - Headless Horseman
- Spider-Man: The Animated Series - Microchip
- Wisdom of the Gnomes - Additional Voices

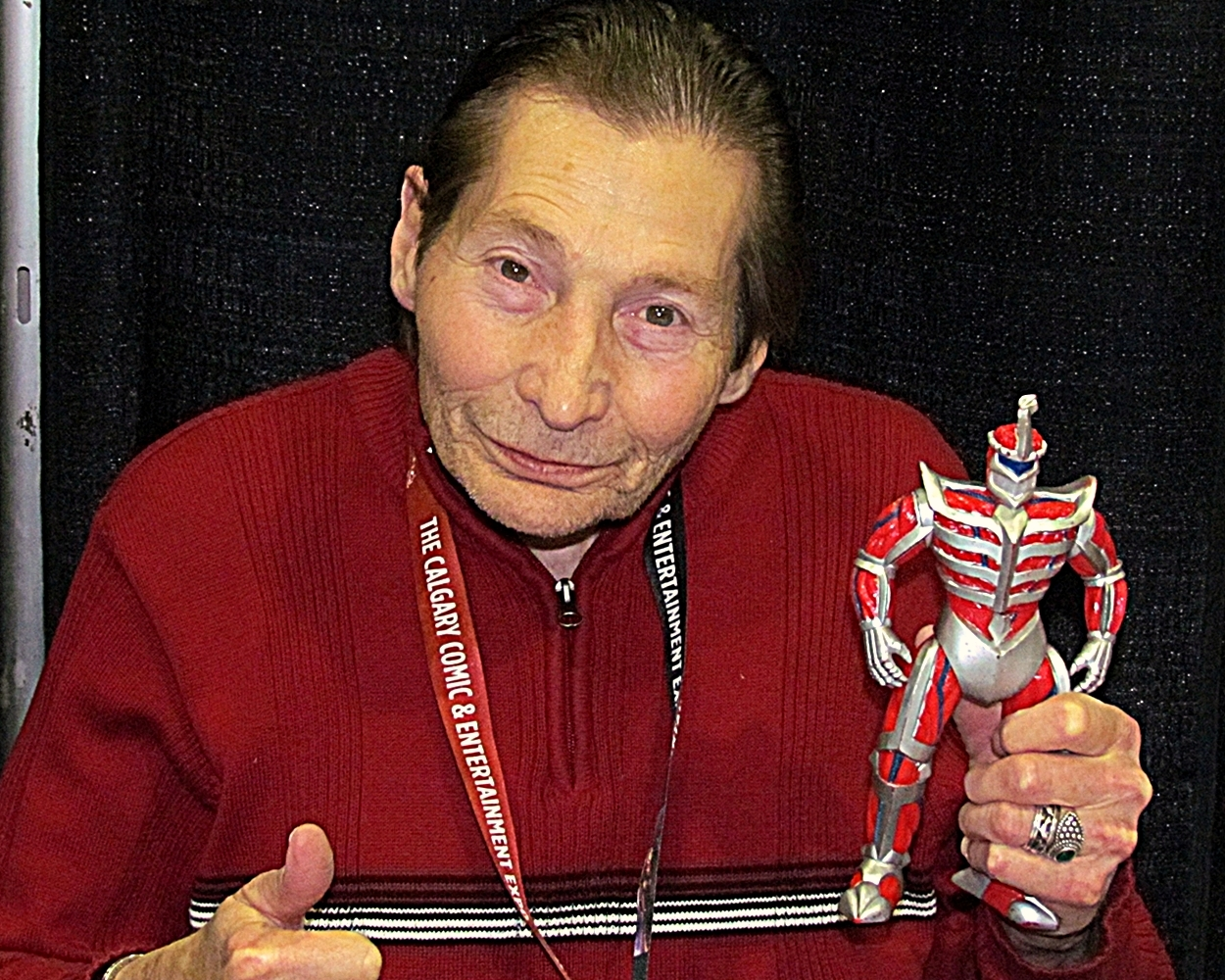
Axelrod at the Calgary Comic and Entertainment Expo in 2012

=== Film ===
| Year | Title | Role | Notes | Source |
|---|---|---|---|---|
| 1976 | The Smurfs and the Magic Flute | Brainy Smurf | English version, Voice | |
| 1978 | Lupin the Third | Mamo | Voice | |
| 1979 | Manxmouse | Frank | English version, Voice, Uncredited | |
| 1980 | Tricks of the Trade | | | |
| 1981 | Swan Lake | Hans | English version, Voice, Uncredited | |
| 1981 | Peter-No-Tail | Fritz | English version, Voice, Uncredited | |
| 1984 | Katy Caterpillar | Gilbert | English version, Voice | |
| 1984 | Lensman | Sol | English version, Voice | |
| 1985 | Victims! | Serial Killer #1 | | |
| 1985 | Peter-No-Tail in Americat | Bill, Philadelphia Philly | English version, Voice | |
| 1985 | Alice in Wonderland | Frog Footman | | |
| 1986 | Bad Guys | Prof. Gimble's Assistant | | |
| 1986 | Murphy's Law | Hotel Clerk | | |
| 1986 | Sorority House Massacre | Larry | | |
| 1987 | Assassination | Finney | | |
| 1987 | The Danger Zone | Ronnie | | |
| 1987 | Neo Tokyo | Tsutomu Sugioka | (segment "The Order to Stop Construction"), English version, Voice | |
| 1987 | Death Wish 4: The Crackdown | Italian Restaurant Bartender | | |
| 1987 | Obsessions | | | |
| 1988 | Akira | Shimazaki | English Version, Voice, Uncredited | |
| 1988 | The Blob | Jennings | | |
| 1988 | Katy and the Katerpillar Kids | Gilbert | English version, Voice | |
| 1988 | The Big Turnaround | Guerro | | |
| 1989 | American Rampage | Coroner | | |
| 1989 | Kinjite: Forbidden Subjects | Security Guard | | |
| 1989 | The Lords of Magick | Pea Prince | | |
| 1989 | Midnight | Ozzie | | |
| 1989 | Fortress of Amerikkka | Gun Store Salesman | | |
| 1989 | Alien Private Eye | Scunge | | |
| 1990 | Chance | Gavin | | |
| 1990 | Repo Jake | King | | |
| 1991 | F.A.R.T. the Movie | Minister | | |
| 1991 | Zeiram | Kamiya | English version, Voice | |
| 1992 | Wishman | Murdock | | |
| 1993 | Beyond Fear | Vince Paige | | |
| 1993 | Rule No. 3 | Mark | Uncredited | |
| 1994 | Taxi Dancers | | | |
| 1995 | Dead Badge | Pimp | | |
| 1995 | Mighty Morphin Power Rangers: The Movie | Lord Zedd | Voice | |
| 1995 | Tornado Run | Don Pinsley | | |
| 1995 | Fatal Pursuit | Billy | | |
| 2000 | Digimon: The Movie | Armadillomon | Voice | |
| 2001 | Metropolis | Ham Egg | English version, Voice | |
| 2001 | The Little Polar Bear | Seagull 3 | English version, Voice | |
| 2001 | Karma to Burn | Reggie | | |
| 2002 | A Light in the Darkness | Dr. Aberdeen | | |
| 2002 | Deep Freeze | Lenny | | |
| 2003 | Exorcism | Dark Prince | | |
| 2003 | A Light in the Forest | Judge Chester | | |
| 2004 | Innocence | Koga / Lin | English version, Voice | |
| 2004 | The Last Shot | Man | | |
| 2007 | The Anatolian | Club Owner | | |
| 2008 | Safety First: The Rise of Women! | Narrator | | |
| 2009 | The Revenant | Racially Confused Veteran | | |
| 2009 | Mega Monster Battle: Ultra Galaxy | Ultraman King | Voice | |
| 2009 | Fist of the North Star: The Shin Saga | | Voice | |
| 2010 | Space Pirate Captain Harlock 2 | | Voice | |
| 2010 | Space Pirate Captain Harlock | | Voice | |
| 2010 | Danguard Ace 3 | | Voice | |
| 2010 | Danguard Ace 2 | | Voice | |
| 2010 | Danguard Ace | | Voice | |
| 2011 | The Adventures of Nadja II | Abel | | |
| 2011 | The Adventures of Nadja | Abel | | |
| 2011 | Gaiking III | Emperor Darius | Voice | |
| 2011 | Gaiking II | Emperor Darius | Voice | |
| 2011 | Gaiking I | Emperor Darius | Voice | |
| 2011 | Frogtown | Ben | | |
| 2011 | Fist of the North Star: The Toki Saga | | Voice | |
| 2011 | Fist of the North Star: The Souther Saga | | Voice | |
| 2011 | Fist of the North Star: The Ray Saga | | Voice | |
| 2012 | Tim and Eric's Billion Dollar Movie | Robert Axelrod | | |
| 2012 | Mommy's Little Monster | Dr. Aberdeen | | |
| 2015 | Monday Morning | Mitch Katz | | |
| 2016 | The Vanquisher | Andrew Spencer | Voice | |
| 2016 | Boonville Redemption | Clyde | | |
| 2017 | The Clapper | Spider Parson | | |
| 2018 | Tales of Frankenstein | Dinu | | |
| 2019 | Induced Effect | Mr. Rodgers | (final film role) | |
