= Night of the Zombies =

1981 American film

- VHS Tape Cover Art
- Directed by: Joel M. Reed
- Written by: Joel M. Reed
- Produced by: Lorin E. Price
- Cinematography: Ron Dorfman
- Music by: Matt Kaplowitz & Maggie Nolin
- Distributed by: InterGlobal Video Promotions Ltd.
- Release date: June 1, 1981
- Running time: 90 minutes
- Country: United States
- Language: English

Night of the Zombies (alternate titles: Night of the Zombies II, Battalion of the Living Dead) is a 1981 American zombie horror war film directed by Joel M. Reed. The film was produced by Lorin E. Price. The film was distributed on VHS by InterGlobal Video Promotions Ltd.

== Plot ==
During World War II, a United States Army chemical warfare battalion was rumored to have done battle against a Nazi Schutzstaffel (SS) unit somewhere in the Bavarian Alps. The two missing in action units were never heard from again. After thirty years, investigators searching for the soldiers' missing bodies look into rumors of soldiers that have turned into zombies.

When several of the investigators are found dead, the Central Intelligence Agency sends Special Agent Nick Monroe in search of deserters from the missing Chemical Warfare unit. A top-secret nerve gas is discovered that has kept a battalion of flesh-eating World War II soldiers alive for decades. The nerve gas is known by the name Gamma 693, and was created to keep wounded soldiers alive until they could be taken to a medical unit. Special Agent Nick Monroe uncovers a plot for world domination.

== Cast ==
- Jamie Gillis as Nick Monroe
- Ryan Hilliard as Dr. Clarence Proud
- Ron Armstrong as Police Capt. Fleck
- Shoshana Ascher as a Prostitute
- Dick Carballo as Bearded Man at Bar
- Richard deFaut as Sgt. Freedman
- Alphonso DeNoble as Krieg – Camera-store Proprietor
- Samantha Grey as Susan Proud
- Juni Kulis as GRO Officer Schuller
- Robert Laconi as Bob Laconi

== Production ==
Many scenes shot for the film were filmed in the home, and on the property of porn director Shaun Costello. The German city locations were filmed in Munich, Bavaria, West Germany. Other shots were filmed in New York. Filming for this film was done despite production problems relating to budget and permit authorization.

This low-budget, much-released horror film first saw the light as Gamma 693 in 1979, was resuscitated as Night of the Wehrmacht Zombies in 1981, and rose again in 1983 as Night of the Zombies. The film was also released under the titles Curse of the Ghoul Battalions, Die Nacht der Zombies, Sister of Death, Battalion of the Living Dead, Zombie War Games and The Chilling.

"Gamma 693 /Night of the Wehrmacht Zombies/ Night of the Zombies II (...) was released on video in the UK as "The Chilling", which meant it was often confused with The Chilling (directors Jack A. Sunseri and Deland Nuse, 1989)": Night of the Zombies is indeed therefore not to be confused with the latter production, The Chilling, which was originally released in 1989 also as Gamma 693.

== Release ==
The film was released in theaters on June 1, 1981. The film was later released on VHS tape in Toronto, Canada by InterGlobal Video Promotions Ltd.

== See also ==
- List of zombie Nazi films
