= Horrors of War (film) =

- Directed by: Peter John Ross
- Written by: Philip R Garrett
- Produced by: Philip R Garrett
- Starring: Jon Osbeck
- Cinematography: Scott Spears
- Edited by: Peter John Ross
- Music by: James Robert Ballard
- Release date: March 25, 2006 (USA)
- Running time: 91 minutes
- Country: USA
- Language: English

Horrors of War is an independently produced Nazi Zombie film derived from the Grindhouse genre. It was directed by Peter John Ross, based on a script by Philip R Garrett.

On the choice to incorporate zombies, Ross stated "we wanted them to be uber-soldiers for the Nazis and wanted them to be faster and just not be affected by bullets as much as regular soldiers."

== Plot ==
American soldiers are sent on a mission to prevent Nazi scientists from creating a super serum to transform their victims into an unstoppable fighting force.

== Cast ==
- Jon Osbeck as Lieutenant John Schmidt
- Joe Lorenzo as Captain Joe Russo
- Daniel Alan Kiely as Sergeant Stephen Gary
- C. Alec Rossel as Captain Mitchell
- David Carroll as Dr. Heinrich Schaltur
- Chip Kocel as Corporal Simpson
- Kim Carey as Colonel Parks
- Sean Velie as Sergeant 'Dimm' Dennison
- Jason Morris as Private Underwood
- Louie Cowan as Sergeant Armstrong
- Milan A. Cargould as Corporal Rueber
- Brandy Seymour as Yvette
- Megan Pillar as Claire

== Reception ==
Rotten Tomatoes currently gives Horrors of War a rating of 9%. Cinema Crazed criticized the acting while praising the "focus on characterization and engrossing scenarios" which created "an entertaining and interesting horror hybrid for the whole family!". Scott Weinberg of FEARnet also reviewed the movie, stating that it was "An admirable little indie that earns points for keeping a poker-straight face throughout all the craziness." Bryan Senn noted that the film's premise, which combined the genres of horror and war, had promise but that "turned out to be a cinematic bridge too far, as its ambition far outstrips its abilities." Massawyrm of Ain't It Cool News reviewed the movie, stating that they weren't quite sure what to make of it and that "Horrors of War is a film that is woefully out of its depth, a film so ambitious, so determined, and yet so big that its low budget simply cannot support it. "

== See also ==
- List of zombie Nazi films
