= Joel M. Reed =

American film director, producer, and screenwriter (1933–2020)

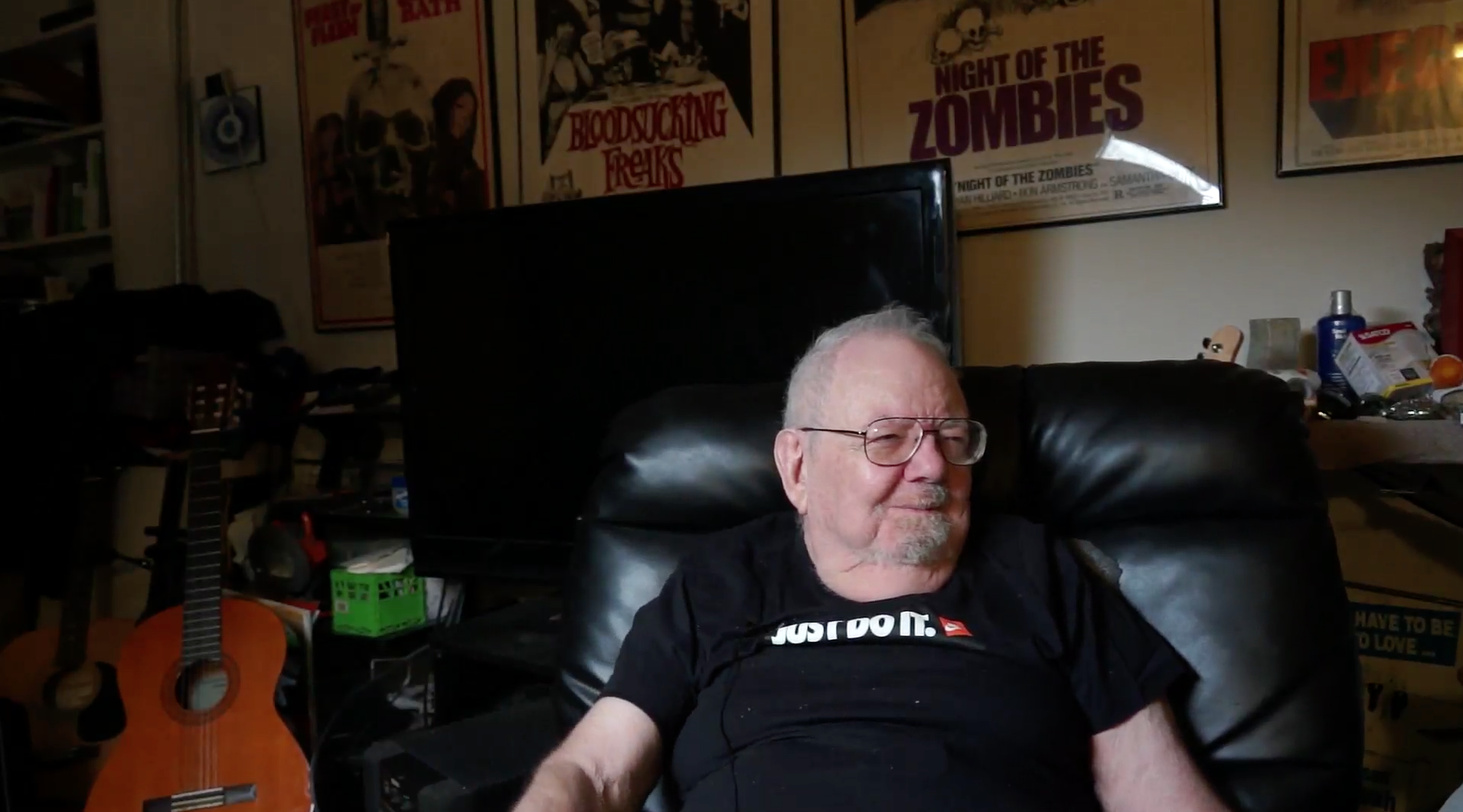
- Joel M. Reed at his apartment from the documentary Reed Unbound: The Joel M Reed Story.
- Born: Joel Melvin Reed; December 29, 1933; Brooklyn, New York City, U.S.
- Died: April 13, 2020 (aged 86); New York City, U.S.
- Occupations: Film director; producer; screenwriter
- Years active: 1968–2020

Joel Melvin Reed (December 29, 1933 – April 13, 2020) was an American film director, producer, screenwriter, and actor.

== Career ==
Reed is best known for directing the controversial Blood Sucking Freaks (1976), a notorious horror comedy that was the subject of protests upon its initial release and has since achieved cult status.

Reed also directed the films Career Bed (1968), Sex by Advertisement (1969), The G.I. Executioner (Wit's End / Dragon Lady / Wild Dragon Lady; 1971), Blood Bath (Terror / Night and the City; 1976),Blood Sucking Freaks (1976) and Night of the Zombies (Gamma 693 / Sister of Death / Battalion of the Living Dead; 1981). Reed wrote all the scripts of the movies he directed.

Reed wrote and directed Blood Bath, which was produced by the Trans-Orient Entertainment Corporation and had a budget of $100,000. In a 1974 interview with The New York Times, he described the film as a "contemporary, episodic occult-horror adventure". Harve Presnell starred in the film as a producer of horror films who arranges in his studio a Black Mass.

On March 1, 1990, Masquerade Books published a book that Reed wrote on Donald Trump called Trump: the Man, the Myth, the Scandal.

In 2011, Reed made a comeback as an actor playing the main character Uncle Joe in the film Dead Eye, directed by Louis Affortunato. After that, Reed acted in eight more films: I Spill Your Guts (2012); Supernaturalz: Weird, Creepy & Random (2012); Trashtastic (2013); Catch of the Day (2014); The Fappening (2015); Vault of Terror II: The Undead (2015); Freak in a Basement (2018); and The Dysfunctional Mob.

In May 2012, Reed signed with Polus Books, which released the books Zombie Wall and Outrage: Hitler Didn't Die.

On September 17, 2018, a book by author John Szpunar was released by Headpress about Reed called Blood Sucking Freak: The Life and Films of the Incredible Joel M. Reed.

Reed was interviewed in December 2018 for a documentary about himself called Reed Unbound: The Joel M. Reed Story (2019), which chronicles his whole life and film career; it was directed by Jerry Landi and Adrian Esposito.

== Death ==
Reed died on April 13, 2020, aged 86, in a care facility in New York City after contracting COVID-19.
