= Filmsite =

Film-review website

Filmsite.org
- Website type: Film criticism
- Available in: English
- Owner: Tim Dirks
- Creator: Tim Dirks
- Website: www.filmsite.org
- Launched: 1996; 30 years ago

Filmsite is a film-review website established in 1996 by senior editor and film critic-historian Tim Dirks.

== Overview ==
The site contains over 300 detailed reviews of English language films for which Dirks argues "there is reasonable consensus by most film historians, critics and reviewers" regarding their status as revered movies. Criteria for Dirks' selections include a film's technical innovations, recognition from award shows, accessibility to audiences, and influence on its genre. Although the "Greatest Films" lists do not include foreign language films and therefore exclude various widely acclaimed movies, Dirks makes clear that they are intended to be geared toward classical Hollywood cinema of the 20th century, and briefly discusses foreign films in many other areas of the site.

In many cases, a review goes through a film scene-by-scene. The site also contains many other lists, and pages offering an introduction to cinema literacy. Filmsite.org is free with limited advertising and no "premium" (fee-based) service. Other features include a section for "Greatest Films of the Year" and summaries of the Academy Awards.

Longtime proponent for the site, Chicago Sun-Times film critic Roger Ebert, described it as "an invaluable repository of movie descriptions and dialogue" and an "awesome website [that] contains detailed descriptions of 300 great American films, along with many other riches."

Filmsite.org considered the Top 100 resulting from the Top 250 Films survey of the Internet Movie Database, "tabulated in the early 2020's decade", and marked the common items with its "100 Greatest Films" as a comparative measure. In a 2020 article about Filmsite, CultureSonar referred to the site as "A One-Man IMDb".
